= List of Byzantine usurpers =

The following is a list of usurpers in the Eastern Roman Empire or Byzantine Empire, from the start of the reign of Arcadius in 395 to the fall of Constantinople in 1453.

== Usurper emperors ==
The following is a listing of Byzantine emperors who rose to the throne due to their own initiative through a revolt or coup d'état.

- Basiliscus (r. 475–476)
- Phocas (r. 602–610)
- Heraclius (r. 610–641)
- Leontius (r. 695–698)
- Tiberius III (r. 698–705)
- Philippicus (r. 711–713)
- Anastasius II (r. 713–715)
- Theodosius III (r. 715–717)
- Leo III the Isaurian (r. 717–741)
- Nikephoros I (r. 802–811)
- Leo V the Armenian (r. 813–820)
- Michael II (r. 820–829)
- Basil I (r. 867–886)
- John I Tzimiskes (r. 969–976)
- Isaac I Komnenos (r. 1057–1059)
- Nikephoros III Botaneiates (r. 1078–1081)
- Alexios I Komnenos (r. 1081–1118)
- Andronikos I Komnenos (r. 1183–1185)
- Isaac II Angelos (r. 1185–1195 and 1203–1204)
- Alexios III Angelos (r. 1195–1203)
- Alexios IV Angelos (r. 1203–1204)
- Alexios V Doukas (r. 1204)
- Andronikos III Palaiologos (r. 1328–1341)
- John VI Kantakouzenos (r. 1341–1354)
- Andronikos IV Palaiologos (r. 1376–1379)
- John VII Palaiologos (r. 1390 and 1403-1408)

== Unsuccessful usurpers in the 5th and 6th centuries ==
List of would-be emperors eventually defeated by the ruling sovereign, listed by reign. The noted date is the attempted usurpation.

=== Zeno: 474–491 ===
- Patricius (475) – The lover of Empress Dowager Verina, who served as a central co-conspirator in the plot that ousted Zeno in 475. He expected to be named emperor, but Basiliscus executed him shortly after seizing power to eliminate a potential rival.
- Armatus (476–477) – General and nephew of Basiliscus who defected to Zeno in exchange for his son being named Caesar, but was executed shortly after Zeno's restoration on suspicion of plotting his own usurpation.
- Marcian (479) – Leo I's son–in–law, who resented the accession of Zeno. Captured the imperial palace but was in turn captured. Spent the rest of his life imprisoned in a fortress in Isauria.
- Romulus and Anthemius (479) – The brothers of Marcian (and sons of Western Emperor Anthemius) who co-led the major 479 uprising in Constantinople. They mobilized the urban populace against Zeno's Isaurian guards before being captured and exiled.
- Leontius (484–488) – An Isaurian commander who was called on to put down the rebel Illus but declared himself emperor instead. He died after a four-year siege of the fortress of Papurius.

=== Anastasius I: 491–518 ===
- Longinus (491–492) – The brother of Emperor Zeno, who expected to succeed to the throne upon Zeno's death. When Anastasius was chosen instead, Longinus incited the Isaurian War in an attempt to depose him, but was defeated, captured, tonsured, and exiled to Egypt.
- Longinus of Cardala & Longinus of Selinus (491–498) – Isaurian military commanders who co-led the major Isaurian revolt following Zeno's death. They mobilized Isaurian forces in Anatolia against Anastasius in an effort to seize power, holding out for years before being captured and executed.
- Areobindus (512) – Proclaimed emperor during a riot at Constantinople, but refused to accept the nomination.
- Vitalian (513–515) – Count of the foederati in Thrace who launched a massive three-year rebellion against Anastasius. Driven by religious opposition to Anastasius' Monophysite policies and personal rivalries, Vitalian marched on Constantinople three separate times in an attempt to depose or subjugate the emperor before his fleet was destroyed.

=== Justin I: 518–527 ===
- Theocritus (518) – The comes domesticorum who attempted to buy support for the throne on the death of Anastasius I.
- Amantius (518) – The influential court eunuch and praepositus sacri cubiculi who masterminded the plot to install his protégé Theocritus. When Justin seized the throne instead, Amantius plotted against the new emperor and was promptly executed alongside Theocritus.
- Vitalian (520) – The powerful military commander who had previously led major rebellions against Anastasius I. Although Justin brought him back into favor and made him consul and general, Vitalian remained a dangerous political rival with vast troop backing and ambitions for power. He was assassinated inside the Great Palace in 520, a plot widely attributed to Justin’s nephew and heir, Justinian.

=== Justinian I: 527–565 ===
- Julianus ben Sabar (529–531) – Leader of a Samaritan revolt, proclaimed "King of Israel". Managed to control the entire Samaria before being defeated.
- Hypatius (532) – A nephew of Anastasius I who was acclaimed emperor during the Nika riots.
- Pompeius (532) – Hypatius's brother, acclaimed co-Emperor alongside him during the Nika Riots; captured and executed.
- Stotzas (536–545) – A Byzantine soldier who was elected the leader of rebel troops in the recently conquered Vandal Kingdom of Africa. Aiming to establish a new kingdom, he was defeated on a number of occasions before finally being defeated and mortally wounded in 545.
- John Cottistis (537) – Usurper in Mesopotamia, he was an infantry soldier who was acclaimed emperor by his troops, but was killed after four days by imperial forces at Dara.
- Guntarith (545–546) – Byzantine commander who assassinated Justinian’s governor (Areobindus), seized Carthage, and briefly ruled Africa as an independent tyrant before being assassinated.
- Stotzas the Younger (545–546) – Succeeded Stotzas as leader of the rebel army in North Africa and allied with Gontharis before the rebellion was finally crushed.
- Artabanes (548–549) – The Armenian general Artabanes, along with Chanaranges and Justin (son of Germanus), plotted to assassinate Justinian and place Germanus on the throne. The plot was exposed by Germanus and the conspirators were arrested.
- Marcellus (562) – A late palace conspiracy involving court officials, bankers, and guards who planned to assassinate the elderly Justinian in his bedchamber. The plot was exposed and foiled at the last minute of the attempted plot.
- Ablabius (562) – A co-conspirator in Marcellus’s 562 plot who attempted to physically enter the palace armed with a dagger to murder Justinian, but was apprehended at the door.

=== Justin II: 565-578 ===
- Justin (566) – A popular general and cousin of Justin II who was a leading candidate for the throne upon Justinian's death. Shortly after Justin II took power, he had his cousin reassigned to Alexandria, where Justin was murdered in his bed, removing a primary rival to the throne.
- Empress Sophia & Justinian (577–578) – Following Justin II's formal adoption of Tiberius as Caesar, the Dowager Empress Sophia conspired with Justinian (brother of the murdered Justin) to overthrow Tiberius and secure power for themselves before Tiberius succeeded as sole emperor.

=== Maurice: 582-602 ===
- Monagriades (588) – Troops on the Persian frontier led a major mutiny against Maurice’s general Priscus after pay cuts were announced, briefly rejecting imperial command and electing their own leaders before being pacified.

== Unsuccessful usurpers in the 7th century ==
=== Phocas: 602-610 ===
- Peter (602) – Maurice’s brother and general who was briefly proclaimed emperor by loyalist troops during the chaotic collapse of the Balkan front in a desperate attempt to counter Phocas's advance, but he was captured and executed.
- Narses (603) – The magister militum per Orientem (commander of the eastern field army) who refused to recognize Phocas’s usurpation. He rebelled at Edessa, called upon Sasanian King Khosrow II for aid, and sparked the devastating Byzantine–Sasanian War of 602–628.
- Empress Constantina (603–605) – The widow of Emperor Maurice who organized palace plots with city elites and Germanus to overthrow Phocas. Her conspiracies were discovered, leading to her torture and execution alongside her daughters.
- Pseudo-Theodosius (603-10) – A man claiming to be Theodosius, the eldest son and co-emperor of Maurice who had supposedly escaped Phocas’s executions. Backed by King Khosrow II as the "legitimate" heir, this pretender was used as a puppet to justify the Sasanian invasion of the Roman provinces.
- Germanus (605) – A high-level palace plot involving Patrician Germanus, Maurice's widow Maria, and several leading senators to depose Phocas. The conspiracy was uncovered, leading to widespread purges and executions of the capital's aristocratic elite.
- Priscus (607) – Phocas's own son-in-law and top military commander. After Phocas publicly humiliated him over statues built in his honor, Priscus secretly began plotting with foreign governors to overthrow the emperor.
- Heraclius the Elder (608–610) – The Exarch of Africa who openly revolted against Phocas, withheld crucial tax revenue and grain shipments to Constantinople, and financed the military campaign that eventually overthrew Phocas.

=== Heraclius: 610–641 ===
- Comentiolus (610–611) – the brother of Phocas, he refused to acknowledge Heraclius' accession and planned to enforce his claim to the throne. He was eventually assassinated.
- John of Conza (617) – described as a tyrannus (a term meaning usurper), he captured Naples but was defeated and killed by Eleutherius, the Exarch of Ravenna.
- Eleutherius (619) – the Exarch of Ravenna, he was a eunuch who set up his capital at Rome, but was murdered by his own troops.
- John Athalarichos (635) – The illegitimate son of Heraclius, he plotted to overthrow his father, but the scheme was uncovered prior to execution. He was mutilated and exiled.
- Vahan (636) – The commander of the Byzantine forces at the decisive Battle of Yarmouk. Faced with catastrophic collapse against the Rashidun armies, his troops mutinied and proclaimed Vahan emperor on the battlefield in a desperate bid for new leadership. He was killed shortly thereafter in the chaos of the Byzantine retreat.
- Titus (640) – An imperial general in Mesopotamia who led a military mutiny against Heraclius’s administration. Appalled by the severe exactions and excesses committed by imperial forces against the local Syrian population, he revolted and took control of the region before being suppressed.

=== Constans II: 641–668 ===
- Maurikios Chartoularios (642) – the dux of Rome, he attempted to establish an independent state in Italy. Executed by the Exarch of Ravenna.
- Valentinus (644) – the father–in–law of Constans II, he appeared at Constantinople with a contingent of troops, and demanded to be crowned emperor. He was overwhelmed by a hostile crowd and murdered.
- Gregory (646–647) – the Exarch of Carthage, his support of Chalcedonian orthodoxy pushed him into conflict with Constans. Killed in battle against the Arabs.
- Olympius (650–652) – the Exarch of Ravenna, he supported the Pope against Constans' religious policies. Marching into Sicily, he died of plague.
- Theodoros Pasagnathes (651–652) – a patrikios who rebelled in Armenia.
- Theodore Rshtuni (653–655) – The Armenian Ishkhan (Prince) who broke his allegiance to Constans II, allied with the Umayyad Caliphate, and led a major Armenian revolt that effectively severed Byzantine central control over Armenia.
- Eleutherios (665–666) – the leader of a local rebellion that overthrew the exarch Gennadius in Carthage.
- Saborios (667–668) – the strategos of the theme of the Armeniacs, he raised a revolt in Anatolia, but died when his out of control horse smashed his head against a city gate.

=== Constantine IV: 668–685 ===
- Mizizios (668–669) – Commander of the Opsikion, he was chosen by the court at Sicily to replace the murdered Constans II. He was eventually executed by forces loyal to Constantine IV.
- John of Sicily (c. 669) – The son of Mizizios, who led a brief follow-up rebellion in Sicily lasting around seven months before being defeated by imperial loyalists.
- Saborios (668–669) – The strategos of the Armeniac Theme who revolted at the end of Constans II's reign and sought military assistance from Caliph Muawiyah I to overthrow the young Constantine IV. His rebellion collapsed when he died in a riding accident before launching an attack on the capital.
- Heraclius & Tiberius (681) – Constantine IV’s younger brothers and co-emperors. In 681, troops from the Anatolic Theme marched to Constantinople demanding that all three brothers continue to rule together (referencing the Holy Trinity). Constantine IV resisted, arrested the military ringleaders, and had both of his brothers' noses slit (rhinotomy) to disqualify them from imperial rule, making his son Justinian II sole heir.

=== Leontius: 695-698 ===
- John the Patrician (698) – The imperial general (patrikios) sent by Leontios to recover North Africa. While not a traditional usurper, he was the target of the initial army mutiny at Crete when his own troops refused his authority, murdered him, and raised Apsimar to the throne instead.

== Unsuccessful usurpers in the 8th century ==
=== Tiberius III: 698-705 ===
- Philippikos Bardanes (c. 702–703) – A patrician’s son exiled by Tiberius III to Cephalonia. Tiberius III preemptively banished him after Bardanes reportedly had a dream suggesting he would become emperor—a move meant to neutralize a potential usurper before he could launch a conspiracy

=== Justinian II: 685–695 and 705–711 ===
- Giorgius (710–711) – after the murder of the Exarch John III Rizocopo, Giorgius usurped imperial authority in Ravenna.
- Helias (711) – Governor of Cherson who revolted alongside the Khazars against Justinian II's punitive expeditions, joining forces with Bardanes (Philippikos) to march on Constantinople.

=== Anastasius II: 713-715 ===
- George Bouraphos & Theodore Myakios (713) – The Opsikion leaders who had helped place Anastasios II on the throne after overthrowing Philippikos. Almost immediately after taking office, Anastasios turned on both conspirators to secure his position, having them blinded and exiled to eliminate them as potential rivals.

=== Theodosius III: 715-717 ===
- Artabasdos (715–717) – The strategos of the Armeniac Theme. He allied his forces with Leo the Isaurian to reject Theodosios III's legitimacy, cementing the pact by marrying Leo's daughter, Anna. His military backing was crucial to the campaign that overthrew Theodosios.

=== Leo III: 717–741 ===
- Basil Onomagoulos (718) – elevated as emperor in Sicily after hearing false news of the fall of Constantinople to the Arabs. Was surrendered to imperial officers when they arrived and then beheaded.
- Anastasius II (719) – The deposed former emperor. Living in exile in Thessalonica, Anastasios gathered support from local conspirators and secured a force from Tervel of Bulgaria. He marched on Constantinople in an attempt to overthrow Leo III. The plot collapsed when the Bulgarians handed Anastasios over to Leo, who had him executed.
- Cosmas (727) – a commander of the army stationed in the theme of Hellas, he was elevated in opposition to Leo's iconoclast policies. Defeated while approaching Constantinople, Cosmas was captured and executed.
- Tiberius Petasius (729–730) – claimed imperial power in Italy in response to the iconoclasm controversy. Defeated and killed by Eutychius, the Exarch of Ravenna.

=== Constantine V: 741–775 ===
- Artabasdos, Nikephoros, Niketas (742–743) – count of the Opsikion theme and the brother–in–law of Constantine V, Artabasdos usurped the throne while Constantine was in Asia Minor. His son Nikephoros was made co–emperor with him at the same time. He reversed Constantine's iconoclast policies, but his armies were defeated. He was blinded and banished to a monastery.
- Stephen the Younger (765) – Monastic leader of Mount St. Auxentius who became the prominent figurehead for active religious resistance against Constantine V's iconoclast policies. Refusing to sign the decrees of the Council of Hieria, he galvanized widespread opposition to imperial authority before being lynched by a pro-imperial mob.

=== Leo IV the Khazar: 775–780 ===
- Nikephoros (776) – Leo IV's half–brother, he attempted to usurp the throne, but was stripped of his rank when it was uncovered.
- Christopher (776) – Leo IV’s half-brothers (sons of Constantine V and his third wife, Eudokia). In May 776, after Leo crowned his five-year-old son Constantine VI as co-emperor, Nikephoros and Christopher led a court plot to seize the throne. The plot was uncovered, and while Leo pardoned his half-brothers due to family ties, several high-ranking conspirators in their network were flogged, tonsured, and exiled to Cherson

=== Constantine VI: 780–797 ===
- Nikephoros (780 and 792) – The eldest of Constantine V's surviving sons, Nikephoros was the focus of several pro-iconoclastic plots: in 780 he attempted to mount the throne after the death of Leo IV, but was prevented by Irene, and he was ordained a priest. Then in 792, some of the imperial tagmata proclaimed Nikephoros as emperor. He was captured by Constantine VI and blinded before being imprisoned in a monastery.
- Elpidios (782) – appointed strategos in Sicily, he was accused of disloyalty and refused to return to the capital, holding out against imperial forces sent to bring him back.
- Alexios Mousele (792–793) – General (droungarios of the Watch) who led the 790 military revolt that brought Constantine VI to sole power. In 792, suspected of plotting to overthrow the emperor, Mousele was imprisoned and blinded by Constantine VI. This action triggered a massive armed revolt by the Armeniac Theme, which held out against imperial control into 793 before being crushed.

=== Irene: 797–802 ===
- Nikephoros (797 and 799) – Although blinded, Nikephoros was still involved in imperial conspiracies. In 797, he materialized in Hagia Sophia, hoping to inspire the populace to support his bid for the throne. It failed and he was banished to Athens. Then in 799, local troops planned to proclaim him emperor, but again it failed.
- Staurakios (799–800) – a eunuch who served Irene, he planned to usurp the throne after falling from favor, launching a revolt in Cappadocia. He died before the revolt was suppressed.
- Aetios (800–802) – A powerful eunuch court official and fierce rival of Staurakios. Following Staurakios's death, Aetios consolidated immense power and attempted to position his own brother, Leo, on the imperial throne as Irene's successor. His ambitious maneuvering alienated the higher civil and military elite, accelerating the plot led by Nikephoros.
- Charlemagne (800–802) – While not a traditional domestic rebel, Charlemagne was crowned "Emperor of the Romans" by Pope Leo III in Rome in 800, directly disputing Irene's legitimacy as sole ruler of the Empire. Charlemagne subsequently sent envoys proposing a marriage alliance to unite the Western and Eastern Empires, a plan cut short by Nikephoros's coup in 802.

== Unsuccessful usurpers in the 9th century ==
=== Nikephoros I: 802–811 ===
- Bardanes Tourkos (803) – the monostrategos in Anatolia, he used the army's discontent over Nikephoros' financial policies to declare himself emperor. Deserted by his commanders, and unable to obtain support in Constantinople he surrendered and was blinded.
- Arsaber (808) – a group of secular and ecclesiastic officials, who were dissatisfied with Nikephoros formed a conspiracy and acclaimed Arsaber, a nobleman holding the rank of patrikios, as emperor. The plot was discovered and Arsaber was tonsured and exiled to a monastery in Bithynia.

=== Michael I Rangabe: 811–813 ===
- Nikephoros (812) – for the sixth time, Nikephoros was involved in a plot for the imperial throne, this time with a group of disgruntled soldiers who tried to proclaim him emperor. The soldiers were disbanded and Nikephoros was moved to the island of Aphousia.

=== Leo V: 813-820 ===
- Thomas the Slav (c. 820) – A senior military commander in Asia Minor. Sources differ on whether he began his uprising in the final days of Leo V's reign or immediately following Leo V's assassination; however, he launched a massive multi-year civil war against Michael II, claiming to avenge Leo V's death and seeking the throne for himself.

=== Michael II: 820–829 ===
- Thomas the Slav (821–823) – a bitter rival of Michael II, Thomas assumed the identity of Constantine VI and gathered an army. He besieged Constantinople, but was forced to retreat to Arkadiopolis where he surrendered. He was later executed.
- The Pseudo-Constantine (821–823) – During his widespread rebellion, Thomas the Slav adopted a young man of obscure origins, renamed him Constantine, and crowned him co-emperor. Constantine served as Thomas's commander and co-ruler throughout the siege of Constantinople until he was captured by Michael II's forces and executed.
- Choireas (823–824) – A senior military officer under Thomas the Slav. Following Thomas's defeat and execution at Arkadiopolis, Choireas refused to surrender, held out in the fortress of Kabala in Thrace, and attempted to maintain the rebellion against Michael II before being captured and impaled.
- Euphemius (826–827) – a Byzantine admiral who killed the governor in Sicily and proclaimed himself emperor, forming an alliance with the Arabs. He died after a skirmish with imperial troops.

=== Theophilos: 829–842 ===
- Manuel the Armenian (c. 829–830) – A senior general (magistros) who fell out with Theophilos shortly after his accession due to court intrigues and rumors of treason. Fearing execution, Manuel fled to the Abbasid court of Caliph al-Ma'mun, where he led Arab forces in campaigns against the Byzantines. However, he maintained secret correspondence with Theophilos, arranged a pardon, and returned to Constantinople, where he was reinstated as Domestic of the Schools (commander-in-chief) and became one of the emperor's most trusted commanders.
- Theophobos (838–839) – a Persian commander in the Byzantine army, his men acclaimed him emperor after the Battle of Anzen. Although he agreed to surrender, he was later executed.

=== Michael III: 842–867 ===
- Karbeas (843–863) – a Byzantine army officer, he established an independent Paulician state centered around Tephrike.
- Bardas (855–856) – While Bardas was Michael’s uncle, their violent overthrow of the regency council led by Empress Theodora and the court eunuch Theoktistos functioned as an internal palace coup. They assassinated Theoktistos, stripped Theodora of power, and banished her to a monastery.

=== Basil I: 867–886 ===
- Chrysocheir (863–872) – the nephew of Karbeas, he succeeded his uncle but was defeated at the Battle of Bathys Ryax and executed.
- Symbatios & George Peganes (867–868) – Symbatios (the patrikios and strategos of the Thracian Theme, who was also married to Caesar Bardas's daughter) and George Peganes (the strategos of the Opsikion Theme) launched a major rebellion in Asia Minor immediately following Basil's rise to power. Outraged by Basil's murder of Caesar Bardas and Michael III, they rebelled to prevent Basil from establishing sole control over the empire. The revolt was crushed by imperial troops, and both leaders were captured, blinded, mutilated, and exiled.
- Leo VI (883–886) – While Basil's own son (and eventual successor) Leo VI was not an armed usurper, he became the focal point of a major court plot. In 883, court rivals led by Theodorokanos convinced Basil that Leo was plotting to assassinate him with a dagger during a hunting trip. Basil had Leo arrested, stripped of his imperial insignia, and nearly blinded before being persuaded to spare him. Leo remained under house arrest for three years until shortly before Basil's death.
- John Kourkouas (886) – leader of a wide-ranging conspiracy against Basil I, the plot was betrayed by his chamberlain.

== Unsuccessful usurpers in the 10th century ==
=== Leo VI the Wise: 886–912 ===
- The St. Mocius Assassin (903) – On May 11, 903, while Emperor Leo VI was walking in a religious procession to the Church of St. Mocius in Constantinople, an assassin lunged from the crowd and struck him on the head with a heavy iron bar. Leo survived only because a ceremonial curtain softened the impact. The assassin was captured and tortured, but the full extent of the conspiracy remained unclear.
- Nicholas Mystikos (903/907) – Following the 903 assassination attempt, imperial court rumors heavily implicated Patriarch Nicholas Mystikos as a co-conspirator behind the plot. Suspicion grew when Nicholas fiercely opposed Leo’s fourth marriage (tetragamy) to Zoe Karbonopsina. Fearing a coup or clerical rebellion, Leo had Nicholas deposed and exiled in 907, replacing him with Euthymios.
- Andronikos Doukas (906–907) – the Domestic of the Schools, he disobeyed Leo's orders to join a military expedition and seized the fortress of Kaballa, near Iconium. Besieged, he fled to Baghdad with Arab help where he was later killed.

=== Constantine VII: 913–959 ===
- Constantine Doukas (913) – the son of Andronikos Doukas, he was approached by the Patriarch of Constantinople to take the throne to prevent the regency of Zoe Karbonopsina. He died during the attempt, thrown from his horse and killed by the imperial guards.
- Leo Phokas the Elder (919) – a former Domestic of the Schools, he attempted to prevent the accession of Romanos I Lekapenos, but was outmaneuvered and his revolt ended in failure. He was captured and blinded.
- John the Rhaiktor (922) – A court conspiracy led by a high-ranking cleric (rhaiktor) named John, who attempted to mobilize imperial guards to overthrow Romanos I. The plot was discovered before it gained traction, and John was forced to flee to a monastery.
- Bardas Boilas (923) – the strategos of Chaldia, he rose in revolt against Romanos I Lekapenos.
- Basil the Copper Hand (932) – claiming to be Constantine Doukas, he launched a revolt in Bithynia but was captured and had his right hand amputated. He replaced his hand with a copper one and launched a second revolt, but it too failed. He was burned alive in the Forum Amastrianum.

=== Romanos II: 959–963 ===
- Basil Peteinos (961) – a senior official under Constantine VII, whom he had helped to secure his throne against the Lekapenoi, Peteinos led a conspiracy involving several high-ranking members of the court, aiming to kill Romanos II and usurp the throne.
- Paschalios (961) – A nobleman holding the rank of patrikios who was a co-leader in the conspiracy. He was arrested, tortured, paraded in public derision in the Hippodrome, tonsured as a monk, and sent into exile.
- Bardas Lips (961) – A high-ranking patrikios and member of the aristocratic Lips family who conspired to kill Romanos II. Like Paschalios, he was tortured, publicly humiliated in the Hippodrome, forcibly tonsured, and exiled.
- Nicholas Chalkoutzes (961) – A member of the prominent Chalkoutzes family who served as one of the active leaders of the plot. He suffered the same fate of torture, public degradation, tonsure, and exile.

=== Nikephoros II: 963–969 ===
- Joseph Bringas (963) – The chief palace eunuch and minister during the regency of Romanos II's sons. Fearing Nikephoros's popularity, Bringas launched an early plot to arrest, blind, or execute Nikephoros before he could take power. This provoked Nikephoros to march on Constantinople, leading to bloody street riots that overthrew Bringas and installed Nikephoros II on the throne.
- Kalokyros (968–971) – a patrician who was dispatched to the court of Sviatoslav I of Kiev in order to persuade him to launch an invasion of the First Bulgarian Empire, with which Byzantium was at war. Sviatoslav agreed to support Kalokyros in his ambition of gaining the imperial throne, but Kalokyros was captured and executed.

=== John I Tzimiskes: 969–976 ===
- Leo Phokas the Younger (970) – The brother of Nikephoros II, he attempted to exert his claim to the throne in 970, but was exiled to Lesbos.
- Bardas Phokas the Younger (970) – The nephew of the assassinated Nikephoros II. In 970, supported by his father (Leo Phokas) and the Phokas clan, Bardas was proclaimed emperor by his troops at Caesarea in Cappadocia. Tzimiskes dispatched general Bardas Skleros to put down the uprising. Phokas's troops deserted him, and he was captured and banished to Chios.
- Nikephoros Phokas (970) – A relative of the murdered emperor who participated directly alongside Leo Phokas in trying to raise Bardas Phokas to the throne in opposition to Tzimiskes. When the plot unravelled, he was captured and exiled alongside the other ringleaders.
- Basil Lekapenos (Alleged Regicide, 976) – The powerful chief eunuch (parakoimomenos) and administrator. After Tzimiskes threatened to investigate the massive wealth and illegally seized lands accumulated by Lekapenos during his campaigns, Lekapenos allegedly orchestrated a palace plot to poison Tzimiskes, resulting in the emperor's sudden death in January 976.

=== Basil II: 976–1025 ===
- Bardas Phokas the Younger (971 and 987–989) – Son of Leo Phokas the Younger, he launched a rebellion in 971 but was captured by Bardas Skleros. He was released from captivity to deal with Skleros, who had also rebelled, whom he defeated in 979. Returned to imperial favor, he was made doux of Antioch, but rebelled against Basil II after the emperor's defeat at the Battle of the Gates of Trajan. He died while charging at Basil in battle.
- Christopher & Bardas Parsakoutenos (976–989) – High-ranking general brothers from the powerful Parsakoutenos family who were accused of treason and actively backed the rebellions of Bardas Skleros and Bardas Phokas.
- Bardas Skleros (976–979 and 987–990) – the Domestic of the Schools in the East, he rebelled after the death of John I Tzimiskes, but was defeated in 979 by Bardas Phokas the Younger. He fled to Baghdad and returned after Basil's humiliation at Trajan's Gate. Seeking an accommodation with Bardas Phokas, he was captured but then released after Phokas' death. He surrendered himself to Basil II.
- Elpidios (981–982) – Governor (Strategos) of the theme of Sicily. Accused of supporting anti-imperial plots, he declared an open rebellion against Basil II. When imperial troops defeated his forces in Sicily, he fled to the Fatimid court in North Africa, where he claimed the title of Emperor and urged the Fatimids to invade Byzantine territories and he would remain in exile.
- Basil Lekapenos (985) – Basil II's grand uncle and the Chief Minister (Parakoimomenos) who ruled as de facto regent early in the reign. Realizing Basil II was taking sole control, Lekapenos organized a high-level palace plot alongside military officers to maintain power. Basil II uncovered the plot, confiscated Lekapenos' vast fortunes, and banished him.
- Leo Melissenos (986) – A prominent general accused of orchestrating a palace coup in Constantinople while Basil II was away campaigning against the Bulgarians. Rumors of his conspiracy forced Basil II into a hasty, disorganized retreat from the Gates of Trajan.
- Theophylaktos Botaneiates (c. 987) – Governor of Antioch who attempted to seize control of the eastern frontier during the chaos of the dual rebellions of Skleros and Phokas, attempting to carve out an independent domain, he was removed from power as Basil II reasserted control over the East.
- Leo Phokas (987–989) – Son of Bardas Phokas the Younger. He served as a senior general in his father's usurping army and attempted to hold out in Antioch and Asia Minor as a rebel leader after his father collapsed and died at Abydos.
- Kalokyros Delphinas (988–989) – The Katepano (governor) of Southern Italy and a high-ranking general who defected to Bardas Phokas the Younger during his revolt. He acted as Phokas' primary lieutenant and attempted to hold Chrysopolis against Basil II. He was captured at Chrysopolis by Basil II's newly acquired Varangian Guard and impaled.
- Demetrios Polemarchios (c. 1000/1001) – A high-ranking officer and magnate in Asia Minor who was accused and arrested for plotting a direct palace coup against Basil II while the emperor was campaigning in the Balkans.
- Nikephoros Phokas Barytrachelos (1022) – the son of Bardas Phokas the Younger, rose in revolt with the support of Nikephoros Xiphias. The two men had a strained relationship, however, and the revolt quickly collapsed after Xiphias murdered Phokas.
- Nikephoros Xiphias (1022) – A celebrated general and hero of the Bulgarian campaigns. Jealous of Basil II’s favor toward other commanders, he co-led a massive rebellion in Anatolia with Nikephoros Phokas Barytrachelos. Xiphias murdered Phokas to claim sole leadership of the usurpation, but his army disintegrated and he was captured by imperial loyalists.
- Nikephoros Komnenos (c. 1025) – The governor (strategos) of Vaspurakan. Near the very end of Basil II's reign, he was accused of conspiring with local Armenian lords to launch an anti-imperial rebellion and carve out an autonomous principality. Basil II had him recalled, arrested, and blinded.

== Unsuccessful usurpers in the 11th century ==
=== Constantine VIII: 1025–1028 ===
- Constantine Bourtzes (1025) – was accused by the emperor of a conspiracy against his life and blinded.
- Nikephoros Komnenos (1025) – the governor of Vaspurakan, he was accused of plotting to overthrow Constantine and was blinded again.
- Bardas Phokas (1026) – the grandson of Bardas Phokas the Younger, he was accused by the palace eunuchs of conspiracy and blinded.
- Prousianos (1026–1028) – A former Bulgarian prince (son of Tsar Ivan Vladislav) serving as a Byzantine general (strategos of the Bucellarian Theme). He became involved in a bitter feud and alleged conspiracy involving Basil Skleros and Romanos Kourkouas. Constantine VIII had him arrested, and he was later blinded and tonsured as a monk.
- Basil Skleros (1028) – A powerful noble, grandson of the usurper Bardas Skleros, and brother-in-law to Romanos III Argyros. He was accused of plotting against Constantine VIII during a court dispute, resulting in his blinding.
- Romanos Kourkouas (1028) – A high-ranking officer and member of the illustrious Kourkouas military family. Accused of being a key co-conspirator alongside Basil Skleros in an anti-imperial plot, he was also blinded.
- Theophylaktos Dalassenos (1028) – The governor (strategos) of the Anatolikon Theme and member of the prominent Dalassenos clan. Constantine VIII suspected him and his family of harboring ambitions for the throne, leading to his arrest and exile.
- Eustathios Maleinos (1028) – Member of one of Anatolia's wealthiest military families. Suspected of supporting plots against the emperor due to his vast land holdings and private army, he was kept under strict house arrest in Constantinople, where his fortune was confiscated.

=== Romanos III Argyros: 1028–1034 ===
- Constantine Diogenes (1029 and 1032) – the doux of Thessalonica, Bulgaria and Serbia, he was accused of conspiring against Romanos III, imprisoned and blinded. Then in 1032 he planned to take advantage of Romanos' absence on campaign in the East to escape to the Balkans and make a new bid to topple Romanos. The plot was discovered and Constantine committed suicide.
- Prousianos (1029) – A Bulgarian prince and former hostage in Constantinople who conspired with Romanos III’s sister-in-law, Theodora, to marry her and usurp the imperial throne. When the plot was uncovered, he was banished to a monastery, and after further charges were confirmed, he was blinded, while his mother was expelled from the capital.
- Theodora Porphyrogenita (1029 and 1031) – Sister-in-law of Romanos III and daughter of Constantine VIII, who became a focal point for anti-imperial plots due to her royal blood. Implicated first in the 1029 plot with Presian II and again in the 1031 conspiracy alongside Constantine Diogenes, she was eventually exiled to the monastery of Petrion and forced by her sister, Empress Zoë, to take monastic vows.
- Basil Skleros (1033) – Brother-in-law of Romanos III Argyros, he plotted against him and was exiled with his wife.

=== Michael IV the Paphlagonian: 1034–1041 ===
- Elpidios Brachamios (1034) – led a popular revolt at Antioch, which led to the arrest of Constantine Dalassenos
- Constantine Monomachos (1034 and 1038) – was twice accused of conspiracy against Michael IV, resulting in his exile to Lesbos.
- Constantine Dalassenos (1034 and 1039) – One of Anatolia's most powerful military aristocrats. Repeatedly suspected of plotting to overthrow Michael IV, he was arrested in 1034, and by 1039, the emperor exiled the entire Dalassenos family to neutralize their influence.
- Vojislav of Duklja (1034 and 1040–1052) – organized a rebellion against Byzantine rule in 1034, but was captured and imprisoned in Constantinople. Upon his release he rebelled again, defeating a number of Byzantine armies and overthrowing imperial rule around the city of Dioklea.
- Empress Zoë (1037) – Desperate to regain power from Michael IV and his tyrannical brother, John the Orphanotrophos, Empress Zoë engineered a secret palace conspiracy to poison John. The plot was discovered, and her freedom inside the imperial palace was further restricted.
- Basil Synadenos (1040) – the strategos of Dyrrhachium, he attempted to crush the rebellion of Peter Delyan but was accused by one of his army commanders of conspiracy against Michael IV and was arrested.
- Michael Dermokaites (1040) – An imperial officer who falsely accused his commander, Basil Synadenos, of conspiring against Michael IV in order to usurp Synadenos's post as governor of Dyrrhachium. His brutal governance immediately sparked a military mutiny that raised Tihomir to the throne.
- George Maniakes (1040) – The celebrated general who reconquered Edessa and major parts of Sicily. During his Sicilian campaign, he quarreled with his admiral (Stephen, the emperor’s brother-in-law). Stephen falsely accused Maniakes of treason and plotting against Michael IV. Maniakes was recalled to Constantinople in chains and imprisoned for the remainder of Michael IV’s reign.
- John Makrembolites (1040) – A senior court official and brother-in-law of Michael Keroularios. He was a principal co-conspirator in the 1040 plot to overthrow Michael IV; when the conspiracy was exposed, he was forced to take monastic vows alongside Keroularios.
- Michael Keroularios (1040) – led an insurrection against Michael IV, but the plot was uncovered, and Michael became a monk to save his life.
- Gregory Taronites (1040) – a patrikios, he instigated a revolt in Phrygia, but was captured.
- Atenulf (1040–1042) – led a Lombard rebellion against Byzantine authority in southern Italy. Was bribed by the Byzantines and replaced as leader of the rebellion by Argyrus.
- Peter Delyan (1040–1041) – the leader of a local Bulgarian uprising against Byzantine rule, he was blinded by his cousin before being defeated by the Byzantines. He was taken to Constantinople and executed.

=== Constantine IX: 1042–1055 ===
- Argyrus (1042) – led the continuing Lombard revolt in southern Italy, but he too defected to the Byzantines, after being offered the position of Catepan of Italy.
- Theophilos Erotikos (1042) – the governor of Cyprus, he took advantage of the fall of Michael V to launch a rebellion. He was arrested and had his goods confiscated before being released.
- George Maniakes (1042–1043) – the Catepan of Italy, he was systematically reclaiming territory in Southern Italy when he was recalled to Constantinople. Furious, he rebelled, and although he destroyed an army sent to capture him, he was wounded during the battle and died.
- Stephanos Pergamenos (1043) – the sebastophoros, he rebelled in Byzantine Armenia.
- Leo Tornikios (1047) – Constantine IX's nephew and the strategos of Iberia, he proclaimed himself emperor at Adrianople and almost took the city of Constantinople. Forced to retreat, he was captured and blinded.
- John Vatatzes (1047) – The principal general and top supporter of Leo Tornikios during his 1047 rebellion. When Tornikios’ army collapsed after failing to capture Constantinople, Vatatzes was captured alongside him, paraded in chains, and blinded on Christmas Day, 1047.
- Nikephoros Kampanares (1050) – a thematic judge and eparchos, he was banished by the emperor on suspicion of plotting to overthrow him, but was later recalled.
- Romanos Boilas (1051) – a senator and commander of the imperial bodyguard, he was a favourite of the emperor. He attempted to assassinate Constantine IX because he was in love with Constantine's mistress. The emperor pardoned him.
- Constantine Barys (1052) – He was exiled by Constantine IX for suspicion of plotting to take the throne. Whilst in exile he prepared to rebel against the emperor, and sought the advice of Saint Lazaros. The plot was discovered and he ended up losing his tongue.

=== Theodora: 1055–1056 ===
- John the Logothete (1055) – As Constantine IX lay dying, this group of senior court ministers plotted to bypass Theodora entirely. They secretly dispatched messengers to bring Nikephoros Proteuon to Constantinople to be crowned, but Theodora acted swiftly, seized the Great Palace, secured the support of the Senate, and thwarted their palace coup.
- Nikephoros Bryennios the Elder (1055) – A prominent general and commander of the western armies. Following the death of Constantine IX, factions within the military attempted to proclaim him emperor to prevent sole rule by an elderly empress. Theodora immediately stripped him of his command, confiscated his properties, and banished him into exile to prevent a military uprising.
- Nikephoros Proteuon (1055) – the doux of Bulgaria, he was selected by Constantine IX to succeed him as he lay dying, but his elevation was pre-empted by Theodora, who banished him.

=== Michael VI Stratiotikos: 1056–1057 ===
- Theodosios Monomachos (1056) – another of Constantine IX Monomachos' nephews, he claimed the throne after the death of Theodora, but his revolt in Constantinople was easily suppressed.
- Nikephoros Bryennios (1057) – a Byzantine general. Furious at his treatment at the hands of Michael VI, he planned to launch a revolt, but he was arrested and blinded by officers loyal to the emperor.
- Hervé Frankopoulos (1057) – a Norman mercenary general, he attempted to establish his own state in eastern Asia Minor but was captured by the emir of Ahlat, Abu Nasr.

=== Isaac I Komnenos: 1057-1059 ===
- Patriarch Michael I Keroularios (1058) – Having orchestrated the abdication of Michael VI, Keroularios attempted to dominate Isaac I and acted as the supreme power in Constantinople. When Isaac slashed Church revenues and confiscated monastic properties to fund the military, Keroularios openly threatened the emperor and adopted imperial regalia. Fearing an imminent palace coup, Isaac dispatched the Varangian Guard to arrest and exile him.

=== Constantine X Doukas: 1059-1067 ===
- Hervé Frankopoulos (c. 1063–1064) – The famous Norman mercenary general served as a military commander on the eastern frontier against the invading Seljuk Turks. During campaigns alongside the Duke of Edessa, he was charged with treasonous conduct and insubordination against imperial authority.
- Nikoulitzas Delphinas (1066) – A wealthy magnate and local lord of Larissa in Thessaly. After Constantine X ignored his warnings about widespread anger over new tax increases, local Vlach, Bulgarian, and Slavic populations launched an armed uprising. The rebels coerced Nikoulitzas into taking command of their revolt. Though the uprising spread across Thessaly, it was eventually neutralized through negotiations, after which Nikoulitzas was arrested and exiled to Amaseia.
- Romanos Diogenes (1067) – A distinguished Cappadocian general accused of conspiring to seize the throne from the young sons of Constantine X as the emperor lay dying. Though convicted of treason and condemned to death, Constantine’s widow, Empress Eudokia Makrembolitissa, pardoned him and subsequently married him, elevating him to emperor as Romanos IV.

=== Romanos IV Diogenes: 1068-1071 ===
- Robert Crispin (1069) – A Norman mercenary leader (Frankopoulos) commanding troops in Armenia. Feeling underpaid and unrewarded, Crispin launched an armed revolt, plundered the Armeniac Theme, and repelled five Byzantine forces sent against him. Romanos IV was forced to divert critical military resources to personally capture him and exile him to Abydos.
- John Doukas & Michael Psellos (1071–1072) – Leaders of the civilian palace faction in Constantinople. Upon hearing of Romanos IV's capture at Manzikert, they staged a palace coup, forced Empress Eudokia into a monastery, and declared Michael VII emperor. When Romanos was released by the Seljuks, they waged a bitter civil war against him, capturing, brutally blinding, and exiling him to his death.

=== Michael VII Doukas: 1071–1078 ===
- Philaretos Brachamios (1071–1078) – On the death of Romanos IV Diogenes, he was acclaimed emperor by his troops and established an independent realm in Germanicia. He abandoned his imperial claims in 1078 in exchange for the title of doux of Antioch.
- Constantine Bodin (1072) – Leader of a revolt in Bulgaria, he was crowned Emperor of the Bulgarians under the name Peter III. He was captured and taken prisoner to Constantinople before being moved to Antioch.
- Georgi Voyteh (1072) – An influential Bulgarian nobleman from Skopje who organized and led the anti-Byzantine insurrection in the Balkans in 1072. Recognizing the need for a royal figurehead, he invited prince Constantine Bodin to take the title of Emperor of the Bulgarians before their force was ultimately crushed by imperial troops.
- Chatatourios (c. 1072–1074) – An Armenian general and officer who led a regional military revolt in Antioch, orchestrating the murder of the imperial governor (Joseph Tarchaneiotes) and seizing control of the city before the region was eventually incorporated into Philaretos Brachamios' autonomous domain.
- Roussel de Bailleul (1073 –1074) – Frankish or Norman mercenary who was given command of 3,000 Frankish and Norman heavy cavalry. He used his cavalry to capture territory in Galatia, declared independence in 1073, sacked Chrysopolis, and defeated and army under John Doukas, before being defeated by Alexios Komnenos.
- John Doukas (1074) – Michael VII's uncle, he was sent to deal with the rebellion of some Norman mercenaries, but was defeated and captured. The Normans convinced him to become emperor, forcing Michael VII to appeal to the Seljuk Turks for aid. They defeated John Doukas and captured him.
- Nestor (1076–1078) – A former slave of Constantine X, he had been promoted to become the dux of Paristrion, on the region bordering the Danube. Having had much of his property and wealth confiscated by the minister Nikephoritzes, he rebelled in around 1076, placing himself at the head of the garrisons under his command, which were already in a state of mutiny due to arrears in their pay. The troops were eager to plunder the Bulgarians, and he obtained the assistance of one of the chiefs of the Patzinaks before marching onto Constantinople. The rebels demanded the dismissal of Nikephoritzes, but discovering that he did not have the numbers to attack the capital, his troops separated into smaller parties, and proceeded to plunder Thrace. Defeated by Alexios Komnenos in 1078, Nestor remained with the Patzinaks, and retreated with them back to Paristrion.
- Levon Davatanos (1077–1078) – the doux of Edessa, he launched an unsuccessful rebellion in the city.
- Nikephoros Basilakes (1077–1078) – The doux of Dyrrhachium in the western Balkans. Following the outbreak of Nikephoros Bryennios' rebellion in 1077, Basilakes assembled his own army of Frankish, Varangian, and Balkan troops to claim the imperial throne for himself. His revolt began under Michael VII and continued into the reign of Nikephoros III Botaneiates, who dispatched Alexios Komnenos to defeat and blind him in 1078.
- Nikephoros Bryennios (1077–1078) – a Byzantine general. News that Michael's chief minister, Nikephoritzes, had listed him for assassination, encouraged him to make his bid for the throne. He was beaten to the throne by Nikephoros III Botaneiates and defeated at Kalavrye by Alexios Komnenos.

=== Nikephoros III Botaneiates: 1078–1081 ===
- Konstantios Doukas (1078) – younger brother of Michael VII Doukas, he tried to assert his claim to the throne, but was handed over by the supporters of Nikephoros III, who banished him.
- Nikephoros Basilakes (1078) – the doux of Dyrrhachium, he proclaimed himself emperor before he too was defeated by Alexios Komnenos and blinded.
- Manuel Basilakes (1078) – Brother of Nikephoros Basilakes, who served as a primary general and co-organizer of the Western army uprising centered at Thessalonica before their forces were defeated by Alexios Komnenos.
- Theodore Gabras (c. 1079–1081) – A warlord and noble from Trebizond who liberated the region of Chaldia from Turkish forces and operated as a de facto independent ruler before Botaneiates formally recognized him as governor to keep him loyal.
- Nikephoros Melissenos (1080–1081) – a Byzantine general, he opposed the elevation of Nikephoros Botaneiates, and promised more territory to the Seljuq Turks in exchange for their support. He abandoned his claim to the throne once Alexios Komnenos was proclaimed emperor.
- Ruben (1080–1095) – an Armenian general, he declared himself the independent ruler of the province of Cilicia

=== Alexios I Komnenos: 1081–1118 ===
- Boril & Germanos (1081) – Two influential Slav-born palace ministers under Botaneiates who uncovered Alexios Komnenos' conspiracy and attempted to have Alexios and Isaac Komnenos arrested before the Komnenoi fled the capital to launch their successful coup.
- Raiktor (1081) – an Eastern Orthodox monk who assumed the identity of Michael VII, and was used by the Norman Robert Guiscard to justify an attack on the Byzantine Empire.
- Lekas (1086) – A Paulician officer who defected from Byzantine service during the Norman invasion and seized control of the city of Philippopolis. He forged strategic ties with local Pecheneg chieftains, but surrendered to Emperor Alexios upon the arrival of imperial forces in exchange for a full pardon.
- Traulos (c. 1086) – A former Manichaean commander in imperial service who deserted after the execution of fellow sect members, fleeing to the fortress of Beliatova. From there, he forged an alliance with the Pechenegs to launch destructive raids across Thrace before fading from the historical record following imperial crackdowns.
- Nilos the Monk (c. 1090s) – A charismatic theologian who gathered a large following in Constantinople by preaching doctrines that challenged the Orthodox Church's stance on the hypostatic union, posing a ideological threat to Alexios' religious authority. Alexios personally interrogated him at a holy synod, where Nilos refused to recant and was officially condemned and permanently exiled to a monastery.
- Ariebes (1091) – An influential Armenian nobleman who joined forces with the Norman mercenary captain Constantine Humbertopoulos to organize a coup against the emperor. Their conspiracy was uncovered before it could be launched, resulting in his immediate arrest and exile from the empire.
- Neantzes (c. 1091) – A Pecheneg chief who feigned loyalty to Alexios I while secretly feeding intelligence to invading Pecheneg forces during the Balkan campaigns. His double-dealing was exposed in camp, leading to his swift execution to prevent further betrayal.
- Constantine Humbertopoulos (1091) – of Norman descent, he was a mercenary captain whose decision to support Alexios, secured him the throne. He was promoted before conspiring against Alexios with an Armenian called Ariebes and was banished.
- Emir Tzachas of Smyrna (1092) – a Seljuk Turkish emir based in Smyrna who claimed the imperial title.
- John Komnenos (1092) – the doux of Dyrrhachium, he was accused by Theophylact of Bulgaria of plotting against the Emperor.
- Karykes (1093) – the governor of Crete, he launched a simultaneous revolt with Rhapsomates against Alexios. News of the imperial fleet's approach caused a counter-coup that overthrew him, during which he was murdered.
- Rhapsomates (1093) – the governor of Cyprus, he also rebelled against Alexios I. He defended Cyprus, but desertions in his ranks saw him attempt to flee, whereupon he was captured after seeking refuge in a church.
- Michael Taronites (1094) – Alexios' brother-in-law, he was convicted of conspiring against Alexios and banished.
- Pseudo-Constantine Diogenes (1094) – A pretender who claimed to be the dead son of Romanos IV Diogenes, Constantine led the Cumans who crossed the Balkan mountains and raided into eastern Thrace. He was killed at Adrianople.
- Nikephoros Diogenes (1094) – the son of Romanos IV Diogenes and a former co-emperor, he had been made governor of Crete by Alexios I. He attempted to murder Alexios twice, but both times he failed, the second time he was caught red-handed with the sword. He was blinded.
- Gregory Gabras (1095) – The son of Theodore Gabras attempted a daring escape from imperial custody in Constantinople to join his father in Trebizond and maintain their family's semi-autonomous control over Chaldia. His plan was foiled when imperial agents intercepted him at Philippopolis, resulting in his immediate arrest and imprisonment in the fortress of Philippopolis.
- Theodore Gabras (1096–1098) – the doux of Chaldia, achieved a level of semi-autonomy before Alexios I managed to reclaim some imperial control.
- Gregory Taronites (1104) – the doux of Chaldia, he tried to take advantage of his province's relative isolation by trying to make himself an independent ruler. Was defeated and captured.
- Michael Anemas (1105) – Along with his brothers and a senator named Salomon, he plotted against Alexios I, but the conspiracy was uncovered, resulting in Michael's imprisonment.
- Solomon (1105) – A prominent senator who joined the Anemas brothers in their treasonous conspiracy to assassinate Emperor Alexios I. Once the plot was exposed, he was stripped of his property and sentenced to lifelong imprisonment alongside the main conspirators.
- Aron (1107) – The illegitimate descendant of a Bulgarian prince, he formed a plot to murder Alexios as he was encamped near Thessalonica, but the presence of the empress Irene and her attendants made this difficult. In an attempt to have her return to Constantinople, the conspirators produced pamphlets that mocked and slandered the empress, and left them in her tent. A search for the author of the publications uncovered the whole plot, resulting in Aron's banishment.
- Pseudo-Leo Diogenes (1116) – Another pretender claiming to be a son of Romanos IV Diogenes, he was the son-in-law of Vladimir II Monomakh, and attempted to overthrow Byzantine authority in Bulgaria.
- Basil the Physician (c. 1118): As the supreme leader of the Bogomil sect, he organized a widespread religious movement that operated as a shadow resistance against imperial and church authority in the capital. After Alexios tricked him into revealing his core doctrines during a private audience, he refused to recant and was publicly burned at the stake in the Hippodrome.

== Unsuccessful usurpers in the 12th century ==
=== John II Komnenos: 1118–1143 ===
- Anna Komnene & Empress Irene Doukaina (1118) – John’s ambitious older sister and mother organized a palace conspiracy upon Alexios I's death to bypass John and place Anna's husband, Nikephoros Bryennios the Younger, on the imperial throne. The plot failed primarily because Nikephoros refused to participate; John confiscated Anna's estates and forced her into lifetime retirement at a monastery, where she wrote the Alexiad.
- Cassianus (1126–1130) – the doux of Paphlagonia, he rebelled at the same time as Constantine Gabras. Frightened by John II's impending preparations to retake the rebellious provinces along the Black Sea, he ceded the province to Gazi Gümüshtigin, the emir of the Danishmend state.
- Constantine Gabras (1126–1140) – the doux of Chaldia, he ruled his province as a virtually autonomous state before John II managed to bring it back under direct imperial control.
- Isaac Komnenos (1130–1138) – John’s younger brother (holding the title Sebastokrator) fled Constantinople after launching a failed coup attempt against John. Isaac spent years in exile forming anti-John coalitions with the Danishmend Turks, the Sultanate of Rum, and Cilician Armenia before eventually submitting to John, after which he was kept under strict court supervision.

=== Manuel I Komnenos: 1143–1180 ===
- John Gouvernes (1143) – At the very start of Manuel's reign, this high-ranking military commander organized a palace conspiracy in Constantinople to seize power before Manuel could solidify his hold on the empire. The plot was uncovered almost immediately, resulting in his arrest and exile.
- Thoros (1145–1169) – a usurper in Cilicia, he escaped from imprisonment in Constantinople and re-established an independent Armenian Kingdom of Cilicia, which had been brought back under imperial control by John II Komnenos. He successfully repulsed a number of military expeditions launched by Manuel I.
- Andronikos Komnenos (1154) – a cousin of Manuel I, he plotted to overthrow Manuel with the support of King Géza II of Hungary who invaded the empire. Andonikos was arrested and confined by the emperor.
- Alexios Axouch (1167) – the grand-nephew of Manuel I and governor of Cilicia, he was accused of conspiring against the emperor and was confined to a monastery for the rest of his life.
- Andronikos Komnenos (1180) – launched a second major attempt to undermine imperial authority toward the end of Manuel's life, stirring up sentiment against Manuel's Western-leaning policies. Though he was kept under tight surveillance, he ultimately exploited the regency crisis after Manuel's death to seize the throne in 1182.

=== Alexios II Komnenos: 1180–1183 ===
- John Komnenos (1181) – son of Andronikos I, tried to plot against Maria-led regency council but was arrested.
- Theodore Pantechnes (1181–1182) – A senior imperial magistrate (dikaiodotes) and Urban Prefect (eparch) who presided over the tribunal that convicted the 1181 conspirators against the regency. When Andronikos Komnenos marched on Constantinople in 1182, Pantechnes’s residence was ransacked by rioting mobs, and he saved his own life by fleeing into flight and exile, losing all judicial standing and offices in the regime change.
- Andronikos Kontostephanos (1182) – the megas doux and commander-in-chief of the Byzantine navy, he was a key supporter of Andronikos Komnenos, but began plotting against him once his tyrannical nature became apparent. He was captured and blinded.
- Andronikos Doukas Angelos (1183) – the father of Isaac II Angelos, he was a Byzantine general who had been sent to quell the rebellion of Andronikos I, but ended up joining the rebellion after being defeated in battle. Once Andronikos I became regent however, Andronikos Angelos entered into a conspiracy with the megas doux Andronikos Kontostephanos, the postal logothete and a number of other officials. He fled to the Kingdom of Jerusalem when Andronikos I uncovered the plot.
- Basil Doukas Kamateros (1182) – Chief minister (Logothetes tou Dromou) who co-led the counter-plot alongside Kontostephanos; arrested and blinded.
- Constantine Angelos (1182–1183) – Eldest brother of Isaac II Angelos who participated in Kontostephanos's plot; later captured and blinded.
- John Komnenos Vatatzes (1183) – governor of the Thracesian theme, he objected to the rise of Andronikos Komnenos. He rebelled at Philadelphia and defeated the forces of Andronikos and Alexios II led by Andronikos Lampardas but died a few days later of natural causes.
- Theodore Angelos (1183–1184) - the son of Andronikos Doukas Angelos, he and his brother Isaac Angelos returned from Palestine and launched a rebellion at Nicaea against the regent Andronikos, prompting him to become co-emperor alongside Alexios II. In early 1184, Andronikos I captured Nicaea after Isaac surrendered the city to him. Andronikos then captured Theodore in Prusa, and had him blinded.

=== Andronikos I Komnenos: 1183–1185 ===
- Andronikos Lampardas (1183) – a Byzantine general, he rebelled when he heard news of Andronikos I's usurpation and murder of Alexios II Komnenos. Attempting to raise forces in Asia Minor, he was captured by officials loyal to Andronikos I and was blinded and soon afterwards killed.
- George Disypatos (1183) – A deacon of the Hagia Sophia and court official who openly denounced Andronikos's murder of young Alexios II and attempted to organize opposition among the clergy. He was arrested, tortured, and exiled.
- John Komnenos (1183) – Former governor of Durazzo accused of harboring seditious ambitions; blinded and exiled.
- Leo Monasteriotes (1183) – A respected high judge accused of illegally obstructing Andronikos’s executions of political prisoners. Saved from execution only by his immense public popularity, he was stripped of all judicial authority.
- Lachanas (1183–1184) – A local leader in Nicaea who, alongside city magnates, shut the gates against Andronikos I following the execution of Alexios II. When Andronikos besieged Nicaea, Lachanas led sorties against the imperial siege engines before the city fell and he was impaled.
- Theodore Doukas (1183–1184) – An aristocratic commander who helped organize the urban defenses of Lopadion alongside the rebels of Nicaea and Prussa. He was captured when the imperial army breached the city and was blinded.
- Nicetas Anchas (1184) – An aristocratic commander who helped lead the defense of Lopadion alongside the people of Prussa and Nicaea against Andronikos I's reprisal armies. Upon the city's capture, he was executed by being dropped from a high siege tower.
- Theodore Kantakouzenos (1184) – the governor of Prussa, he attempted to assassinate Andronikos, but his horse stumbled during the attempt, throwing Theodore to the ground. He was beheaded by Andronikos' guard.
- Michael Mamalos (1184) – A prominent citizen of Nicaea who served as a primary organizer of the city's anti-Andronikos uprising. Following the imperial siege of Nicaea, Mamalos was captured, condemned for treason, and burned alive in the hippodrome on Andronikos’s direct orders.
- Isaac Komnenos of Cyprus (1184–1191) – a minor member of the Komnenos family, he hired a troop of mercenaries and sailed to Cyprus with falsified letters commanding Byzantine officials to obey him. He was crowned emperor and brutally terrorized the island. He was eventually overthrown by Richard I of England, who captured Cyprus on his way to the Holy Land during the Third Crusade.
- Constantine Makrodoukas (1184) – an official who was accused of aiding Isaac Komnenos of Cyprus before he was executed.
- The Unknown Brother of Constantine Makrodoukas (1184) – After the noble Constantine Makrodoukas was executed on suspicion of aiding Isaac Komnenos of Cyprus, his brother attempted to incite a palace mutiny to avenge him, resulting in his immediate arrest and execution.
- Michael Tripsychos (1184/1185) – Elevated noble accused of plotting against co-emperor John; arrested and blinded.
- Alexios Komnenos (1185) – the grandnephew of Manuel I Komnenos and his cup-bearer, he was banished by Andronikos Komnenos but fled to the court of William II of Sicily. There, he obtained William's support for his claim to the throne, and William used this to launch a Norman invasion of the empire, culminating in the capture of Thessalonica.
- Sebastianos Brothers (1185) – Court aristocrats who organized a palace conspiracy to assassinate Andronikos I and elevate Alexios Komnenos (above) to the throne. The plot was exposed and the brothers were executed.
- Andronikos Palaiologos (1185) – A senior military commander sent to confront the Norman invasion. Following the fall of Durazzo, Andronikos I accused him of treasonous negligence and intentional retreat. He was stripped of his titles and military command.
- David Komnenos (1185) – The imperial governor of Thessalonica during the Norman siege. Following the brutal sack of the city by William II’s troops, Andronikos accused David of incompetence and treason for failing to organize an adequate defense. He was arrested by imperial agents and died in captivity.
- Alexios Komnenos (1185) – the illegitimate son of Manuel I Komnenos (as well as being Andronikos' son-in-law), he was promoted as emperor by the Sebastianus brothers, but Alexios was taken and blinded. He was later accused of conspiring with Andronikos Komnenos and forced to take Holy Orders.

=== Isaac II Angelos: 1185–1195 ===
- Michael Kantakouzenos (1185–1186) – a Byzantine noble who conspired with the Norman invaders and attempted to incite local revolts in western Greece against Isaac II's newly established authority before being suppressed.
- Manuel Komnenos (1185) – the eldest son of the deposed Emperor Andronikos I, he attempted to rally regional troops against Isaac II to maintain his family's hold on power following his father's execution. He was captured and blinded on Isaac II’s orders.
- Constantine Tornikes (1185–1186) – a Byzantine nobleman who organized an armed conspiracy against Isaac II in Thrace shortly after the new emperor took power. His conspirators betrayed him, and he was arrested and imprisoned before he could march on Constantinople.
- Andronikos Bryennios (1186) – the governor of Thessalonica, he was accused of conspiring with Alexios Komnenos to usurp the throne. He demanded the opportunity to refute the charges, but was blinded without a trial.
- Andronikos Komnenos (1186) – was a late 12th-century Byzantine provincial governor blinded in 1186 after being accused of plotting against Isaac II.
- Alexios Branas (1187) – a Byzantine general raised to the rank of protosebastos, he had defeated the Normans and had been sent to deal with the Vlach-Bulgarian Rebellion when he rebelled. He was defeated in battle by Conrad of Montferrat, Isaac II's brother-in-law and beheaded.
- John Doukas (1187) – Isaac II's own uncle and senior military commander. During the 1187 siege of Constantinople by Alexios Branas, Isaac II openly accused and suspected John Doukas of secretly aiding the rebels from within the imperial palace due to his close familial connections to the Branas family.
- Theodore Branas (1187) – the son of the rebel general Alexios Branas, who participated in his father's march on Constantinople to depose Isaac II. He was pardoned following his father's defeat and decapitation.
- Basil Kamateros (1188/1189) – an influential aristocratic official who was implicated in a palace conspiracy to overthrow Isaac II while the emperor was occupied with domestic administrative reforms. He was stripped of his titles and exiled.
- John Kamateros (1189) – a prominent aristocratic magistrate (and relative of Basil Kamateros) who was investigated by imperial agents under suspicion of transmitting intelligence from Constantinople to the rebel forces of Theodore Mangaphas in Philadelphia. While spared execution due to lack of definitive evidence, he was disgraced and removed from imperial service.
- Theodore Mangaphas (1188–1189 and 1204–1206) – the governor of Philadelphia, he declared himself emperor in 1188, forcing Isaac II to march out against him. Theodore agreed to relinquish the imperial title in exchange for retaining his position at Philadelphia. After the fall of Constantinople in 1204, he again claimed the imperial title, only to be overthrown by Theodore I Laskaris.
- Demetrios Komnenos (1189) – a relative of the former dynasty who attempted to organize an aristocratic coup in Constantinople while Isaac II was distracted negotiating with Frederick Barbarossa during the Third Crusade. His network was exposed, and he was stripped of his titles and imprisoned.
- The Unnamed Doux of Braničevo (1189) – an unnamed Byzantine provincial governor in the northern Balkans under Isaac II who was accused by both imperial officials and Western crusaders of acting treasonously. He secretly ordered local garrisons and ambush units to harass Frederick Barbarossa’s Third Crusade forces against Isaac II's official diplomatic directives, bringing imperial forces into unauthorized conflict with the Holy Roman Empire.
- Theodore Kastamonites (1189) – an influential court official and uncle to Isaac II who faced plot allegations from rival court factions attempting to destabilize Isaac II's administration through internal sabotage.
- Constantine Tatikios (1190) – achieved the support of 500 influential people to overthrow Isaac II, but was discovered, arrested and blinded.
- Andronikos Kontostephanos (c. 1190) – a military commander belonging to the elite Kontostephanos clan who fell under heavy imperial suspicion after failing to suppress local anti-taxation riots in Greece. Suspected of deliberately withholding troops to engineer an aristocratic coup against Isaac II, he was stripped of his military command.
- Basil Chotzas (1190–1204) – launched a rebellion and established a semi-autonomous state centred at Tarsia in north-western Anatolia.
- Constantine Aspietes (1190/91) – a Byzantine general, he objected to the way the war against the Vlach was proceeding and attempted to obtain support from the army. He was removed from command and blinded.
- Isaac Komnenos (1191) – incarcerated when his uncle Andronikos I Komnenos was overthrown, he escaped from prison and made a bid for the throne at Hagia Sophia. He was captured and tortured, dying the next day.
- "The Ragged Komnenos" (c. 1191) – an unnamed, impoverished nobleman of Komnenian descent mentioned by Niketas Choniates who attempted to incite a rebellion in Constantinople shortly after the execution of Isaac Komnenos. He was arrested by imperial guards and blinded.
- John of Trebizond (1191–1192) – a Pontic noble who attempted to break Trebizond away from central imperial administration and declare local autonomy, taking advantage of the unrest generated by the Third Crusade. He was suppressed by local loyalist garrisons.
- Pseudo-Alexios II (1192) – a pretender claiming to be the dead son of Manuel I Komnenos, he obtained support from Sultan Kilij Arslan II and attacked Phrygia. He was assassinated by a priest.
- The Anonymous Bithynian Monk (c. 1192) – An unnamed monk in the region of Bithynia who acted as a chief political agent and prophet for one of the Pseudo-Alexioi (pretenders claiming to be Manuel I's slain son). He rallied local provincial elites against Isaac II before imperial forces put down the regional uprising.
- Pseudo-Alexios II (1192) – another royal pretender, he arose in Paphlagonia, but was defeated in battle by Theodore Choumnos, the chartularius, who captured and then put him to death.
- Seditious Priest of the Maeander Valley (c. 1192) – an unnamed local priest in Anatolia who acted as a key regional conspirator alongside the local Pseudo-Alexios. After initially helping mobilize several thousand provincial troops against imperial rule, he turned traitor during the campaign and personally assassinated the pretender to end the uprising.
- Constantine Angelos Doukas (1193) – Isaac II's cousin, success in the Bulgarian War saw him declare himself emperor. He was handed over to Isaac by his fellow officers and was blinded.
- Alexios Gidos (1194/1195) – a senior general (domestikos) who served under Isaac II during the disaster at the Battle of Arcadiopolis . Following the catastrophic defeat against the Bulgarians, rival officers accused him before Isaac II of cowardice and intentionally abandoning the field to undermine the emperor's military prestige ahead of the 1195 campaign.
- Pseudo-Alexios II (1195) – a third imposter claiming to be the slain son of Manuel I Komnenos, he raised a local rebellion in Bithynia. He was captured near Nicomedia and blinded by imperial loyalists shortly before Isaac II was overthrown.
- Spyridonakes (c. 1195) – a governor of the province of Smolena in Thrace who organized a localized revolt and attempted to establish an autonomous lordship during the administrative collapse late in Isaac II’s first reign.

=== Alexios III Angelos: 1195–1203 ===
- Alexios Kontostephanos (1195 and 1200) – the former governor of Crete, after Isaac II's overthrow he was acclaimed emperor by the mob who declared their desire never to be ruled by the Komnenoi again. He was captured and imprisoned. He tried again in 1200, but was again unsuccessful.
- Pseudo-Alexios II (1196) – another pretender claiming to be the son of Manuel I Komnenos, he rose up at Nicomedia but was captured and blinded.
- Pseudo-Isaac II (c. 1197–1198) – an anonymous provincial adventurer in northern Anatolia who raised a local revolt claiming to fight on behalf of the deposed and blinded Isaac II. Imperial loyalist troops dispersed his regional militia before he could march on the capital but failed.
- Ivanko (1198–1200) – after marrying Theodora Angelina and thus entering the imperial family, Ivanko rebelled in Thrace, capturing the general Manuel Kamytzes in 1198. He was taken prisoner during a meeting with the emperor's representative, Alexios Palaiologos.
- Dobromir Chrysos (1198–1202) – emerging in Macedonia and Thessaly, he also was offered marriage to Theodora Angelina to gain his allegiance. He fought against the emperor with the help of Manuel Camytzes, but was at last conquered by the Bulgarian emperor Kaloyan.
- Manuel Kamytzes (1199) - Attempt a plot to seize power and divide the empire while Alexios III lay near death from a sudden illness. They were thwarted when the emperor recovered and hastily married his daughters to loyalist generals.
- Michael Kantakouzenos (1199) – arrested by Alexios III in 1195, he unsuccessfully declared himself emperor in 1199.
- John Komnenos the Fat (1201) – a relatively unimportant Byzantine noble, he had himself crowned emperor by a monk in Hagia Sophia and took control of the Great Palace. Alexios III struck back during the night, his forces recapturing the palace and beheading John Komnenos.
- Manuel Komnenos (1201) – the grandson of Andronikos I, an aristocratic plotter who, alongside his brothers Alexios and David (the future founders of Trebizond), covertly financed and orchestrated the 1201 capital conspiracy behind John Komnenos the Fat. Following the coup's failure, he fled to Asia Minor to set up a regional stronghold.
- Leo Chamaretos (1200–1206) – The proedros of Lacedaemonia, he established a breakaway regime in Laconia. He was eventually thrown out by the Venetians.
- Michael Komnenos Doukas (1200–1201) – The governor of the Theme of Mylasa and Melanoudion in Asia Minor, he rebelled but was defeated by Alexios III and forced to flee to the Seljuks. He eventually became the founder and first ruler of the Despotate of Epirus from 1205 until his death in 1215.
- Leo Sgouros (1201–1208) – governor of the area of Nauplia and the Argolid, he rebelled against Alexios III and established himself as an independent ruler. He expanded his territory throughout central Greece until confronted by the armies of the Franks. After a siege of five years he apparently committed suicide.
- John Spyridonakes (1201) – revolted against Alexios in southern Thrace.
- The Anonymous Conspirator of Blachernae (1202) – a high-ranking palace official recorded in medieval epitomes who attempted to subvert the Varangian Guard and open the gates of the Blachernae Palace to depose Alexios III. Loyalist guards exposed the plot, leading to his arrest, torture, and exile.

== Unsuccessful usurpers in the 13th century ==
=== Alexios IV Angelos: 1203–1204 ===
- Alexios Kontostephanos (1203) – A high-ranking noble who attempted an urban uprising in Constantinople shortly after Alexios IV was restored by the Crusaders in August 1203. He attempted to gather popular support to seize the throne, taking advantage of the initial chaos, the revolt failed to gain widespread military traction and was put down.
- Leo Gabalas (1203–1239) – governor of Rhodes, he established an independent principality on the island claiming the title of Caesar. He submitted to the suzerainty of the Empire of Nicaea in 1226, but remained in charge of the island until his death. He was succeeded by his son John Gabalas.
- Radenos (1204) – a prominent senator nominated by the assembly of citizens in the Hagia Sophia immediately prior to Nicholas Kanabos. He refused to accept the crown and fled the cathedral in disguise to avoid being lynched by the mob demanding a militaristic leader to fight the Crusaders.
- Nikolaos Kanabos (1204) – proclaimed emperor by the people during the Fourth Crusade, he refused to leave the Hagia Sophia. He was killed by Alexios V Doukas soon after.

=== Theodore I Laskaris: 1204/5–1221 ===
- Manuel Maurozomes (1204–1206) – the illegitimate grandson of Manuel I Komnenos, he tried to establish a separate principality in Phrygia with the support of Sultan Kaykhusraw I.
- Sabas Asidenos (1204–1206) – a powerful local magnate who seized control of Sampson and the lower valley of the Maeander River. He eventually acknowledged the authority of Theodore Laskaris and the Empire of Nicaea.
- Theodore Gabras (1204–1208) – the independent archon of Amisos and the Pontus, his territory was soon incorporated into the Empire of Trebizond under Alexios I, who appointed him as governor of the region.
- David Komnenos (1204–1207) – the brother of Alexios I of Trebizond, he took possession of territory in Paphlagonia and the Pontus, but was under pressure from Theodore I Laskaris, forcing him in 1207 to acknowledge the Latin Empire's authority over his territory.
- John Kantakouzenos (1205–1209) – the archon of Methone, he established a breakaway regime at Messenia.
- Nikos (or Nicholaos) of Trebizond (c. 1205–1206) – Independent local governors along the Paphlagonian coast who resisted Nicaean tax collectors and administration. Theodore I Laskaris campaigned directly against these autonomous Pontic coastal garrisons to establish the northern frontier of the Nicaean state.
- Brother of Sabas Asidenos (c. 1205–1206) – Served as a co-ruler and military commander in the Maeander River valley alongside Sabas Asidenos. He actively led troops against Theodore Laskaris's early expansion before their faction capitulated and accepted Nicaean suzerainty.
- Alexios Aspietes (1205) – the ruler (dynastes) of Philippopolis, he was proclaimed the leader of the town after the defeat of the Latin armies in the summer of 1205, and given the task of organizing the defences of the city against the advancing forces of Kaloyan of Bulgaria, who took the town.
- Theodore Branas (1205–1206) – the Lord of Adrianople, he established a breakaway state but was forced to accept the overlordship of the Latin Empire to protect the city from the ambitions of the Bulgarian emperor, Kaloyan.
- Alexios Angelos (1211) – The deposed Byzantine emperor who roamed Greece and Asia Minor seeking to reclaim his crown. In 1211, he allied with the Seljuk Sultan Kaykhusraw I to invade Nicaea and dethrone Theodore I Laskaris; after the Seljuks were defeated at the Battle of Antioch on the Maeander, Alexios III was captured by Laskaris and forced into a monastery in Nicaea.
- Isaac and Alexios Nestongos (c. 1212–1214) – Cousins of Theodore I Laskaris who plotted to depose him and usurp the Nicaean throne with the backing of rival aristocratic factions. Their plot was betrayed, leading to their immediate arrest; Isaac was imprisoned while Alexios fled to the Latin Empire.
- Theodore Komnenos Doukas (1215–1230) – the son of the sebastokrator John Doukas and of Zoe Doukaina, he was the half-brother of Michael I Komnenos Doukas and succeeded him in Epirus on his death. After his conquest of Thessalonica in 1224, he declared himself Byzantine Emperor. He was defeated and captured by Ivan Asen II of Bulgaria who blinded him.

=== John III Doukas Vatatzes: 1221–1254 ===
- Leo Gabalas (1222–1240) – The autonomous "Caesar" and ruler of Rhodes who maintained virtual independence from Nicaea. When John III launched a major military expedition to subdue Rhodes in 1232–1233, Gabalas held on to power and went so far as to form a treasonous alliance with the Republic of Venice against Nicaea.
- Isaac Laskaris and Alexios Laskaris (1224) – the younger brothers of Theodore Laskaris, they resented the accession of John III and offered their services to the Latin Emperor. With the help of the Latins, they attempted to overthrow John III but were defeated in battle, taken captive and blinded.
- Manuel Kontofre (c. 1224) – A prominent Nicaean noble and military commander who was implicated alongside the Nestongos brothers in their major aristocratic conspiracy against John III's accession. His involvement was uncovered before the coup could launch, leading to his arrest and the seizure of his estates.
- Andronikos Nestongos and Isaac Nestongos (1224) – the cousins of John III, they attempted to overthrow the emperor and place Andronikos as emperor with the support of a significant number of Byzantine nobles. The plot was uncovered, but Andronikos managed to escape to the Seljuk Turks.
- Manuel Komnenos Doukas (1230–1237) – the brother of Theodore Komnenos Doukas, he took over the rule of the Empire of Thessalonica after the capture of his brother, although de facto a powerless Bulgarian vassal. He was overthrown when his brother returned from captivity and fled to the east. He returned in 1239 and set himself up as the ruler of Thessaly until his death.
- Elpidios (c. 1235) – A Nicaean provincial administrator accused of secretly communicating with the rebel regime in Epirus and passing intelligence to Nicaea's enemies. Following a formal treason investigation at court, he was stripped of his titles and confined under strict house arrest.
- John Komnenos Doukas (1237–1242) – son of Theodore Komnenos Doukas, installed by him as Emperor of Thessalonica after he overthrew his brother Manuel in 1237. In 1242 he was forced to renounce the title of Emperor for that of Despot by Vatatzes.
- John Gabalas (1239–1250) – the brother of Leo Gabalas, he took over rule of the island of Rhodes on his brother's death, but by 1250 had submitted to the authority of the emperor at Nicaea.
- George Mouzalon (c. 1252) – A low-born favorite of the court who was accused by jealous traditional aristocrats of using sorcery and treasonous intrigue to influence the emperor. Imperial investigations found no evidence of treason, allowing him to retain Vatatzes' complete trust and eventually become regent for the dynasty.
- Michael Palaiologos (1252–1253) – The future emperor was accused by rival courtiers of conspiring to overthrow John III Vatatzes after being implicated in treasonous correspondence. To prove his innocence, he was challenged to undergo a trial by ordeal with red-hot iron, which he cleverly talked his way out of before being cleared and restored to his command.

=== Theodore II Laskaris: 1254-1258 ===
- Alexios Strategopoulos (1257–1258) – The military officer (and future conqueror of Constantinople) who was accused of conspiring with disgruntled aristocratic families against the emperor, resulting in his arrest and confinement.
- Michael Strategopoulos (1255–1256) – A senior Nicaean general who was accused of treason and operational negligence following military reversals against the Bulgarians, leading to his arrest and imprisonment.
- Michael Palaiologos (1256) – Accused of high treason by Theodore II for allegedly plotting a coup with the backing of the Seljuk Turks. Fearing swift execution, he fled to the Sultanate of Rum to serve as a mercenary commander before returning under a pledge of amnesty.

=== John IV Laskaris: 1258-1261 ===
- Michael Palaiologos (1258) – Nine days after Theodore II died, Michael Palaiologos orchestrated the brutal assassination of Theodore’s chosen regent, George Mouzalon, during a memorial service at the monastery of Sosandra. Michael then seized the regency, usurped the throne from Theodore's 7-year-old son John IV Laskaris, and eventually had the boy blinded and imprisoned, ending the Laskarid dynasty.

=== Michael VIII Palaiologos: 1259–1282 ===
- George Mouzalon (1258) – the protovestiarios and co-guardian of young John IV Laskaris. Michael Palaiologos organized an aristocratic conspiracy at the monastery of Sosandra, where loyalist troops assassinated Mouzalon and his brothers (Andronikos and Theodore) during a memorial service to seize control of the regency.
- Pseudo-John IV Laskaris (1262) – the treatment of John IV Laskaris by Michael VIII saw an uprising occur at Nicaea under a pretender who claimed he was the boy, forcing Michael to drag out the real John IV to disprove the pretender's claims.
- Isaac Raoul (c. 1265–1270) – a high-ranking nobleman and pinkernes who joined the anti-imperial Arsenite conspiracy alongside his family. He openly refused to acknowledge Patriarch Germanos III or Emperor Michael VIII following the blinding of John IV Laskaris. Michael had him arrested, blinded, and imprisoned.
- Andronikos Tarchaneiotes (c. 1271–1273) – a high-ranking nobleman and nephew of Michael VIII (son of Michael's sister Martha Palaiologina). Alienated by Michael's court intrigues and religious policies, Andronikos defected to Michael's arch-rival, John Doukas of Thessaly, marrying John's daughter and leading military operations against his own uncle's imperial armies.
- Manuel Komnenos Doukas of Thessaly (1271–1275) – Brother and ally to John Doukas of Thessaly. While John Doukas declared himself Orthodox Emperor in 1280, Manuel led armed revolts and regional separatist movements throughout Epirus and Thessaly earlier in Michael's reign, defeating imperial forces sent to assert Constantinople's control over the region.
- Maria Palaiologina Eulogia (1274–1282) – a cabal of high-ranking palace aristocrats led by Michael VIII's own sister, Eulogia, alongside senior military officers. Enraged by Michael's forced Union of the Churches at the Council of Lyon (1274), they covertly financed foreign enemies (including John Doukas of Thessaly) and organized court plots to replace Michael with an Orthodox loyalist.
- John Tarchaneiotes (c. 1275–1280) – a military commander and prominent leader of the Arsenite anti-imperial movement. He organized clandestine network cells in Thrace and Asia Minor, attempting to subvert army units against Michael VIII before being arrested and exiled.
- John Doukas (1280) – the Ruler of Thessaly, he was appointed sebastokrator by Michael VIII, but the alliance between the two was always uneasy. He became the champion of the anti-union forces, and in 1280 he nominated himself as the Orthodox emperor of the empire, but Michael was able to hold on to power.
- Nostongos Doukas (1280) – a military commander and relative of the Laskarid-Doukas bloodline who attempted to orchestrate an army mutiny in Macedonia while campaigning against Thessaly. He sought to leverage widespread military discontent over Michael VIII's Church Union with Rome, but loyalist officers exposed the plot before he could seize command.
- Alexios Philanthropenos (1280) – a distinguished Byzantine commander and relative of the emperor who was dispatched to campaign in Thessaly against John Doukas. Alienated by Michael VIII's religious policies and supported by anti-Unionist troops, he attempted an army mutiny to seize local command before being arrested, blinded, and replaced by loyalist forces.
- John Drimys (c. 1280) – an Orthodox monk and anti-Unionist leader who orchestrated a widespread conspiracy in Constantinople targeting Michael VIII. He claimed direct divine authority to overthrow the emperor for accepting papal supremacy; the plot was exposed, leading to his trial, defrocking, and imprisonment.

=== Andronikos II Palaiologos: 1282–1328 ===
- Michael Strategopoulos (c. 1283) – a nobleman and military commander (son of the famous general Alexios Strategopoulos) who organized a conspiracy in Constantinople to depose Andronikos II shortly after his accession. He sought to exploit the political instability surrounding the reversal of Michael VIII's Church Union, but the plot was exposed and he was permanently imprisoned.
- Constantine Palaiologos (1292) – the son of Michael VIII Palaiologos, his status as porphyrogennetos saw him attempt to assert a claim to the throne in 1292.
- Alexios Philanthropenos (1295) – a Byzantine general, he was the doux of the Thracesian Theme. His troops proclaimed him emperor after achieving some victories over the Turks. He was eventually taken prisoner during negotiations with Andronikos II and blinded.
- Pseudo-John IV of Bithynia (1296) – an anonymous impostor who appeared in the Bithynian frontier region during the chaos of Turkic invasions, claiming to be the deposed and blinded John IV Laskaris. He attempted to rally the local military population and akritai against Andronikos II's government but was captured and executed by imperial border commanders.
- Alexios Raoul (c. 1296) – a member of the powerful Raoul aristocratic clan who was arrested and imprisoned on suspicion of covertly funding Arsenite anti-imperial cells and plotting to subvert Andronikos II's government during the campaigns in Bithynia.
- Demetrios Doukas Komnenos Koutroules (1304) – In 1304, he was accused of conspiring against the emperor and imprisoned him.
- Isaac Apanas (1304) – A prominent capital aristocrat and senator accused of holding secret correspondence with foreign powers and dissident military commanders to depose Andronikos II. Their plot was betrayed to the emperor, resulting in their arrest, property confiscation, and imprisonment in the capital.
- Monks Isaac and Hyakinthos (1304–1310) – two prominent Arsenite monks who led an underground, anti-imperial religious network in Constantinople. Operating on behalf of the displaced Laskarid faction, they orchestrated multiple clandestine court plots and urban riots to delegitimize and depose Andronikos II, considering his whole dynasty uncanonical and illegitimate until the schism was formally healed in 1310.
- John Drimys (1305) – a would-be priest from Epirus, he claimed to be descended from the Laskarid emperors, and tried to overthrow Andronikos II. He was arrested.
- John Komnenos Palaiologos (1326–1327) – the son of Constantine Palaiologos, he was the governor of Thessalonica when he decided to take advantage of the civil war raging between Andronikos II and Andronikos III Palaiologos by declaring the independence of his province. He died soon afterwards.

== Unsuccessful usurpers in the 14th and 15th centuries ==
=== Andronikos III Palaiologos: 1328–1341 ===
- Manuel Tagaris (c. 1328–1329) – a prominent general and governor of Philadelphia who initially vacillated during the climax of the civil war between Andronikos II and Andronikos III. Accused of harboring sympathies for the old regime and withholding municipal taxes in Anatolia, he was investigated and reassigned to maintain military loyalty in the East.
- Syrgiannes Palaiologos (1333–1334) – the governor of Thessalonica, he was suspected of plotting for the throne when he was adopted by Maria, the mother of Andronikos III in 1333. He fled to the court of the Serbian king, Stephen Dušan, who gave him a large Serbian army. He invaded the empire but was eventually murdered.
- Sphrantzes Palaiologos (1334) – an imperial officer who engineered a covert double-agent conspiracy at the request of Andronikos III. He pretended to betray the emperor and joined Syrgiannes Palaiologos's rebel camp outside Ohrid, using the pretense of anti-imperial solidarity to gain Syrgiannes's trust before stabbing him to death and collapsing the Serbian-backed invasion.
- Alexios Philanthropenos (1336) – Governor of Lesbos and Grand Duke (Megas Doux). Capitalizing on the island's strategic distance and Latin naval threats, he established an autonomous hold on Lesbos, withholding imperial revenues and defying central directives from Constantinople, Andronikos III dispatched an imperial fleet under John Kantakouzenos in 1336 to besiege Mytilene. Philanthropenos surrendered, was stripped of his governorship, but was spared execution due to his family's high standing and past military service.
- Nikephoros Basilakes (1338–40) – A local Epirote nobles led by Nikephoros Basilakes and Giolas launched a bloody pro-independence rebellion in favor of the young Nikephoros II Orsini. They captured Arta and imprisoned the imperial governor, Theodore Synadenos. Andronikos III personally led an expeditionary force to besiege Arta and crush the uprising in 1340.
- Giolas (1338–1340) – An Epirote noble who co-led the armed insurrection alongside Nikephoros Basilakes against Byzantine rule in Western Greece. He was instrumental in seizing Arta and imprisoning the Byzantine governor Theodore Synadenos in an effort to restore the local Orsini dynasty.

=== John V Palaiologos: 1341–1391 ===
- Nikephoros II Orsini (1339–1340 and 1356–1359) – refused the position of a Byzantine vassal in Epirus, Nikephoros attempted to rule in Epirus with the help of Catherine of Valois, the titular Latin Empress of Constantinople. He was defeated and persuaded to surrender by John Kantakouzenos. After the fall of John Kantakouzenos, with whom he was allied, he set himself up in Thessaly, taking advantage of the death of Stephen Uroš IV Dušan of Serbia. He died while fighting the Albanians.
- George Choumnos (1341–1342) – a prominent senator and governor of Thessalonica who attempted to orchestrate a royalist takeover of the city on behalf of John VI Kantakouzenos at the onset of the Second Palaiologan Civil War. The urban populace and anti-aristocratic factions discovered his conspiracy, driving him out of the city and seizing his properties.
- Michael Gabrielopoulos (1342) – related to the former sebastokrator Stephen Gabrielopoulos, he claimed to be the hereditary lord of the area around Trikala in Thessaly, but was ousted by a governor sent by John VI Kantakouzenos.
- John Angelos (c. 1342–1348) – a general and cousin of John VI Kantakouzenos who was appointed governor of Thessaly and Epirus. Taking advantage of the central government's total collapse, he established near-total political independence in Thessaly, maintaining autonomous diplomatic relations with Stefan Dušan until his death from the Black Plague.
- John Vatatzes (1345) – a wealthy magnate and megas stratopedarches who repeatedly changed allegiances between John VI Kantakouzenos and the Regency of Anna of Savoy. In 1345, after marrying his daughter to the Emir of Karasi, he attempted to organize his own Turkish-backed military rebellion in Thrace to seize power in the region. However, his Turkish mercenaries mutinied and assassinated him at Garella.
- Stephen Uroš IV (1346–1355) – the ruler of Serbia, he claimed the title of Emperor (Tsar) of the Serbs and Romans in 1346 until his death.
- Matthew Kantakouzenos (1354–1357) – the son of John VI Kantakouzenos, based in Thrace, he fought with John V after the abdication of his father for the throne. He was eventually captured and was forced to move to the Morea.
- Manuel Asen (1354–1355) – brother-in-law of John VI Kantakouzenos and governor of Bizye. When John V Palaiologos forced John VI to abdicate in 1354, Manuel refused to surrender his province to imperial forces. He held out in Thrace, attempting to maintain an independent Kantakouzenian enclave until forced into submission.
- Stephen Uroš V (1355–1371) – the son of Stephen Uroš IV, he too claimed the title of Emperor, although much of his territory was lost to various nobles and the Turks.
- Manuel Doukas Angelos Komnenos Phrantzes (c. 1355–1358) – a regional noble in southern Greece who briefly attempted to assert a royal claim to portions of the Peloponnese, taking advantage of the power vacuum left by the collapse of Stefan Dušan's Serbian empire and the retreat of John VI Kantakouzenos. His small-scale rebellion was quickly suppressed by the local imperial governor.
- John Limpidarios (1356) – the captain of Nikephoros Orsini's fleet, he took advantage of Nikephoros' absence to attack Ainos, and gained control of the city. He was eventually thrown out of the city.
- Simeon Uroš (1356–1370) – appointed governor of Epirus and Thessaly by Stephen Uroš IV Dušan of Serbia, he was thrown out by Nikephoros II Orsini, after which he declared himself Emperor of the Serbs and Romans in 1356. He established himself in Thessaly which he controlled till his death.
- Thomas Preljubović (1366–1382) – he attempted to usurp authority in Epirus, forcing Simeon Uroš to recognize him as the ruler in exchange for Thomas recognising Simeon as his suzerain. He was recognised in 1382 by John V with the title of despotes.
- John Asen (c. 1366) – a member of the Bulgarian imperial family and brother-in-law to Emperor John V who managed brief command of several Thracian border garrisons. He briefly sought to carve out an independent lordship with the help of local Hungarian and regional mercenaries during the Hungarian crusading pressure under Louis I, before being brought back under imperial control.
- Andronikos Palaiologos (1373 and 1384) – the son of John V, he plotted to murder his father in 1373, but it was uncovered, resulting in Andronikos losing one of his eyes. He again rebelled in 1384, and was driven into exile at Selymbria.
- Demetrios Kantakouzenos (1383) – son of Matthew Kantakouzenos who attempted to usurp power in the Despotate of the Morea upon his father's death. Rejecting the appointment of Theodore I Palaiologos by John V, Demetrios organized a local military rebellion in the Peloponnese to maintain Kantakouzenian dynastic rule, but died suddenly during the struggle.

=== John VI Kantakouzenos: 1347-1354 ===
- Theodore Komnenos (c. 1348) – a regional governor in the western provinces who briefly renounced his oath to John VI immediately after the conclusion of the civil war. He attempted to build an independent fiefdom by seizing municipal tax revenues, prompting a swift punitive military expedition led by Kantakouzenos's loyalists to strip him of his command.
- Constantine Akropolites (c. 1351) – a high-ranking member of the palace administration in Constantinople who was arrested after imperial guards intercepted secret correspondence he was carrying to pro-Palaiologan loyalists outside the city. He was accused of conspiring to open the capital's gates to John V, leading to his immediate imprisonment and confiscation of his estate.
- Michael Doukas (c. 1352) – a wealthy nobleman and military officer stationed near the Thracian frontier who was arrested on charges of treasonous communication with Serbian border agents and Palaiologan loyalists. Suspected of preparing a localized military mutiny to cut off imperial supply lines, he was dragged to Constantinople and locked in the imperial dungeons.
- George Laskaris (c. 1352–1353) – an aristocrat inside Constantinople who acted as a primary underground liaison for John V Palaiologos. Operating right under John VI's nose in the capital, Laskaris managed safehouses, funded secret pro-Palaiologan pamphlets, and helped coordinate the logistics for the final coup that overthrew John VI.
- Theoktistos (c. 1353) – an influential monk in Constantinople who used his sermons to rally anti-Kantakouzenian sentiment and secretly sheltered young pro-Palaiologan conspirators. When imperial authorities discovered he was acting as a central clearinghouse for underground political plots, he was arrested and forcibly transferred to a remote, high-security monastery.

=== Andronikos IV Palaiologos: 1376-1379 ===
- Theodore I Palaiologos (1376–1383) – As Andronikos IV seized power in Constantinople, his brother Theodore took advantage of the central chaos to establish an autonomous power base in the Despotate of the Morea (Peloponnese). He actively resisted attempts by both Andronikos IV and John V to assert direct central control over the Peloponnese, securing his own independent rule.
- Michael Raoul (1377) – A high-ranking military commander in Thrace who remained fiercely loyal to the deposed John V Palaiologos. When Andronikos IV sent imperial troops to secure provincial towns, Michael Raoul organized a local armed resistance and minor military mutiny in the Thracian hinterlands to block Andronikos's garrisons before being captured.

=== Manuel II Palaiologos: 1391–1425 ===
- Demetrios Laskaris (c. 1393–1394) – A high-ranking military commander stationed in one of the remaining Thracian garrisons who secretly conspired with Ottoman agents during Bayezid I's early blockades. He plotted a local military mutiny to hand his strategic fortress over to the Turks in exchange for a local governorship, but loyalist officers uncovered the plot, arrested him, and executed him for treason.
- Michael Rendakis (c. 1399–1400) – An aristocrat inside Constantinople who took advantage of Manuel II's prolonged absence in Western Europe (seeking military aid against the Ottomans). Rendakis formed an underground palace cabal with disaffected nobles to challenge the regency council led by John VII. The conspiracy was exposed before it could launch an armed takeover of the Blachernae Palace.
- Theodosios Kyprios (fl. c. 1414) – alleged to harbor imperial ambitions by the writer Mazaris ("even in his dreams he wears the white imperial robes").

=== John VIII Palaiologos: 1425–1448 ===
- Demetrios Palaiologos (1442 and 1448) – the brother of John VIII, he claimed the throne in 1442 based on his status as a porphyrogennetos. Although he attempted to harness the anti-Catholic opposition to John, he was abandoned by his army and exiled at Selymbria. He again attempted to usurp the throne in 1448 once John VIII died, but was opposed by his mother, who supported the claim of Constantine XI Palaiologos.

== See also ==
- List of Byzantine civil wars
- List of Roman usurpers
