= List of Byzantine revolts and civil wars =

This is a list of civil wars or other internal civil conflicts fought during the history of the Eastern Roman or Byzantine Empire (330–1453). The definition of organized civil unrest is any conflict that was fought within the borders of the Byzantine Empire, with at least one opposition leader against the ruling government. For external conflicts, see the list of Byzantine wars. For the period before the division of the Roman Empire in West and East, see List of Roman civil wars and revolts (753 BCE – 476 CE).

== 4th century ==
- 395-398: Revolt of Alaric I
- 399: Gothic Revolt of Tribigild in Phrygia.
- 400: Revolt of Gainas.

== 5th century ==
- 479: Attempted usurpation of Marcian.
- 484: First Samaritan Revolt.
- 484–488: Rebellion of Illus and Leontius against Emperor Zeno.
- 492–497: Isaurian War.
- 495: Second Samaritan Revolt.

== 6th century ==
- 513–515: Rebellions of Vitalian against Anastasius I.
- 529–531: Third Samaritan Revolt under Julianus ben Sabar.
- 532: Outbreak of the popular Nika revolt in Constantinople. Hypatius proclaimed Emperor and later executed by Justinian and Theodora.
- 536–537: Military revolt in Africa, led by Stotzas.
- 555/556: Fourth Samaritan Revolt.

== 7th century ==
- 602: Revolt and usurpation of Phocas.
- 603–604: Rebellion of general Narses against Phocas.
- 608–610: Revolt of Africa under Heraclius the Elder, successful seizure of the throne by his son Heraclius the Younger.
- 610–611: Revolt of general Comentiolus, brother of Phocas, against Heraclius.
- 613-628: Jewish revolt against Heraclius, short lived Sassanid Jewish Commonwealth is formed.
- 617/618: John of Conza seizes Naples but is killed by the exarch Eleutherius.
- 640: Rebellion of general Titus in Mesopotamia in protest against excesses committed by other Byzantine troops.
- 644/645: Failed coup by Valentinus against his son-in-law Constans II.
- 646–647: Rebellion of Gregory the Patrician, Exarch of Africa.
- 650–652: Rebellion of Olympius, Exarch of Ravenna.
- ca. 651: Rebellion and defection to the Arabs of Armenian soldiers under Theodore Rshtuni.
- 667: Revolt of Saborios, the general of the Armeniacs.
- 668–669: Murder of Constans II and attempted usurpation by Mizizios in Sicily.
- 680: Abortive revolt of the Anatolic theme in favour of Constantine IV's brothers.
- 692/693: Revolt and defection to the Muslims of the Armenian patrician Smbat.
- 695: Revolt and usurpation of Leontios against Justinian II.
- 695–717: Twenty Years' Anarchy after the deposition of emperor Justinian II.
- 698: Revolt and overthrow of Leontios by the army returning from the failed expedition against Carthage.

== 8th century ==
- 705: Overthrow of Tiberios Apsimaros by Justinian II.
- 709: Rebellion in Ravenna led by George against the arrest of archbishop Felix, led by Georgios.
- 711: Rebellion of the Chersonites led by Philippikos Bardanes leads to the successful overthrow of Justinian II.
- 715: Revolt of the Opsician troops at Rhodes results in a six-month civil war. Anastasios II abdicates in favour of Theodosios III.
- 716–717: Revolt and successful usurpation of general Leo the Isaurian.
- 717/8: Revolt of Sergius, governor of Sicily, who declares Basil Onomagoulos as emperor.
- 726/4: Uprising in Venice against Byzantium. The cause was the iconoclastic decrees of Emperor Leo III the Isaurian. The rebels elect Orso Ipato the Doge of Venice.
- 726/7: Revolt of the Helladic Theme under the tourmarches Agallianos Kontoskeles and a certain Stephen against the iconoclastic policies of Leo III.
- 741–743: Revolt and usurpation of Artabasdos against Constantine V.
- 780: Abortive coup in favour of Nikephoros, a brother of Leo IV.
- 781–782: Imperial expedition against Elpidius, governor of Sicily.
- 790: Military revolt against the regency of Irene of Athens. Her son Constantine VI is made sole ruler.
- 792–793: Rebellion of the Armeniacs against the restoration of Irene of Athens as co-ruler by Constantine VI.
- 800: Uprising in Cappadocia, instigated by Staurakios.

== 9th century ==
- 803: Revolt of Bardanes Tourkos.
- 821–823: Revolt of Thomas the Slav.
- 827: Revolt of admiral Euphemius in Sicily.
- 837: Revolt of the Smolyani Slavic tribe in the Balkans.
- 838–839: Revolt of the Khurramite troops under Theophobos.
- 866: Revolt of Symbatios the Armenian and George Peganes in western Asia Minor against the rise of Basil the Macedonian.

== 10th century ==
- 919: Unsuccessful rebellion by Leo Phokas the Elder against the seizing of power by Romanos Lekapenos.
- 921: Revolt by the Slavic Melingoi and Ezeritai tribes in the Peloponnese.
- ca. 922: Revolt by Bardas Boilas, governor of Chaldia.
- ca. 930: Popular revolt of Basil the Copper Hand in Opsikion.
- 970: Rebellion of the Phokas supporters under Bardas Phokas the Younger against John I Tzimiskes.
- 976–979: Rebellion of Bardas Skleros against Basil II.
- 987–989: Rebellion of Bardas Phokas the Younger against Basil II.

== 11th century ==
- 1022: Conspiration of Nikephoros Xiphias and Nikephoros Phokas Barytrachelos against Basil II.
- 1026–1027: Revolt of Basil Skleros.
- 1034: Popular revolt under Elpidios Brachamios at Antioch.
- 1034–35: Rebellion of Serbs under Stefan Vojislav.
- 1038–39: Rebellion of Serbs under Stefan Vojislav.
- 1040: Revolt of Gregory Taronites in Phrygia.
- 1040–1041: Uprising of Peter Delyan, a Bulgarian rebellion in the western and southern Balkans.
- April 1042: Popular uprising in Constantinople against Michael V Kalaphates, who was deposed. Empress Zoë Porphyrogenita was restored as empress, and her sister Theodora Porphyrogenita was crowned co-empress against her will.
- Mid-1042: Revolt of the governor of Cyprus, Theophilos Erotikos, crushed by new emperor Constantine IX Monomachos.
- 1042–1043: Rebellion of George Maniakes against Constantine IX Monomachos, crushed when Maniakes died in battle in near Thessalonika.
- 1047: Revolt of Leo Tornikios against Constantine IX.
- 1057: Revolt of Hervé Frankopoulos.
- 1057: Revolt and successful usurpation by Isaac I Komnenos (Battle of Petroe).
- 1066: Revolt against heavy taxation in Thessaly under Nikoulitzas Delphinas.
- 1071–1072: Byzantine war of succession, after Byzantine emperor Romanos IV Diogenes was defeated in the Battle of Manzikert (26 August 1071) and deposed when John Doukas enthroned Michael VII Doukas in Constantinople (24 October 1071). The war consisted of the Battle of Dokeia and the Sieges of Tyropoion and Adana, all of which Romanos lost. Simultaneously, the Uprising of Georgi Voyteh (1072) took place in Bulgaria, which was also crushed by Michael VII.
- 1072: Uprising of Georgi Voyteh.
- 1073–1074: Revolt of Roussel de Bailleul proclaims Caesar John Doukas Emperor.
- 1077–1078: Revolt and successful usurpation by Nikephoros III Botaneiates.
- 1077–1078: Revolt of Nikephoros Bryennios the Elder against Michael VII Doukas and Nikephoros III, defeated at the Battle of Kalavrye.
- 1078: Revolt of Philaretos Brachamios against Michael VII Doukas.
- 1078: Revolt of Nikephoros Basilakes against Nikephoros III.
- 1080–1081: Revolt of Nikephoros Melissenos against Nikephoros III.
- 1081: Revolt and successful usurpation by Alexios I Komnenos.
- 1091–92: Rebellion of vassal Vukan in Serbia.
- 1092: Rebellions of Karykes at Crete and Rhapsomates at Cyprus.
- 1095: Cuman invasion of Thrace in support of the impostor pretender Constantine Diogenes.
- 1095–1098: Revolt of Theodore Gabras, governor of Chaldia.

== 12th century ==
- 1102: Rebellion of vassal Vukan in Serbia.
- 1149: Rebellion of vassals Uroš II and Desa in Serbia.
- 1166: Rebellion of vassal Stefan Nemanja in Serbia.
- 1181: Popular uprising in Constantinople in support of Maria Komnene against Alexios Komnenos.
- 1182: Revolt and successful usurpation of Andronikos I Komnenos, resulting in the Massacre of the Latins.
- 1183/1184: Revolt of general Andronikos Lapardas.
- 1183/1184: Revolt of John Komnenos Vatatzes, governor of the Thracesian theme, against the regency of Andronikos I Komnenos.
- 1184: Revolt of Theodore Kantakouzenos, governor of Prussa.
- 1184–1191: Revolt and establishment of a breakaway regime by Isaac Komnenos at Cyprus.
- 1185: Uprising of Asen and Peter, establishment of the Second Bulgarian Empire.
- 1185: Revolt and successful usurpation by Isaac II Angelos.
- 1187: Revolt of Alexios Branas against Isaac II Angelos.
- 1188–1189: Revolt and establishment of a breakaway regime by Theodore Mangaphas at Philadelphia.
- 1190–1204/05: Revolt and establishment of a breakaway regime by Basil Chotzas at Tarsia.
- 1192: Revolt of Pseudo-Alexios II.

== 13th century ==
- ca. 1200–1206: Revolt and establishment of a breakaway regime by Leo Chamaretos in Laconia.
- ca. 1200–1208: Revolt and establishment of a breakaway regime by Leo Sgouros in NE Peloponnese and Central Greece.
- 1201: Coup by John Komnenos the Fat against Alexios III Angelos in Constantinople is violently suppressed.
- 1201: Revolt of John Spyridonakes in Macedonia.
- 1201–1202: Revolt of Manuel Kamytzes and Dobromir Chrysos in Thessaly and Macedonia.
- 1202–1204: Fourth Crusade was redirected to Constantinople to intervene in a Byzantine succession dispute after the deposition of emperor Isaac II Angelos.
- 1204–1205: Second revolt and establishment of a breakaway regime by Theodore Mangaphas at Philadelphia.
- 1204–1205: Revolt and establishment of a breakaway regime by Manuel Maurozomes at Phrygia.
- 1204–1206: Revolt and establishment of a breakaway regime by Sabas Asidenos in the lower Maeander River.
- 1204–1206: Revolt and establishment of a breakaway regime by John Kantakouzenos at Messenia.
- 1222–1224: Isaac and Alexios Laskaris flee to the Latin Empire in opposition to the accession of John III Vatatzes. In 1224 they return at the head of a Latin army, but are defeated and captured at the Battle of Poimanenon.
- 1225: Revolt of Isaac and Andronikos Nestongos against John III Vatatzes.
- 1295: Rebellion of Alexios Philanthropenos against Andronikos II Palaiologos.

== 14th century ==
- 1321, 1322, and 1327–1328: Byzantine civil war of 1321–1328. Intermittent civil war between Andronikos II Palaiologos and his grandson Andronikos III Palaiologos.
- 1341–1347: Byzantine civil war of 1341–1347 between John VI Kantakouzenos and the regency for John V Palaiologos, including Anna of Savoy.
- 1342–1350: Revolt and establishment of breakaway regime by the Zealots of Thessalonica.
- 1352–1357: Byzantine civil war of 1352–1357 between John V Palaiologos, John VI Kantakouzenos and Matthew Kantakouzenos.
- 1373–1379: Byzantine civil war of 1373–79. Revolt and usurpation of Andronikos IV Palaiologos.

== 15th century ==
- 1453–1454: Popular revolt in the Despotate of the Morea against the despots Demetrios and Thomas Palaiologos. It is suppressed by Ottoman troops.

== See also ==
- List of Byzantine usurpers
- Medieval Wars
- Political mutilation in Byzantine culture

== Sources ==
- Bartusis, Mark C. (1997). The Late Byzantine Army: Arms and Society 1204–1453. University of Pennsylvania Press. ISBN 0-8122-1620-2.
- Kazhdan, Alexander, ed. (1991), Oxford Dictionary of Byzantium, Oxford University Press, ISBN 978-0-19-504652-6
- Kaegi, Walter Emil (1981), Byzantine Military Unrest, 471–843: An Interpretation, Amsterdam: Adolf M. Hakkert, ISBN 90-256-0902-3
- Savvides, Alexios G. K. (1995). Μελέτες Βυζαντινής Ιστορίας 11ου - 13ου αιώνα. 2η Έκδοση με διορθώσεις και συμπληρώσεις [Studies in Byzantine History of the 11th–13th centuries. 2nd Edition with corrections and additions] (in Greek). Athens: M. Kardamitas Publications. ISBN 960-354-019-6.
- Treadgold, Warren T. (1997). A History of the Byzantine State and Society. Stanford, CA: Stanford University Press. ISBN 0-8047-2630-2.
