= Cosmas (usurper) =

Byzantine usurper

Cosmas (died 727) was an unsuccessful Byzantine usurper during the reign of Leo III.

In 726/727, a revolt broke out in Hellas against the Iconoclast policies of Leo III. Cosmas was declared emperor by the rebels. The insurrection was soon crushed in April 726/7 (Note: in April of the tenth indiction year of Leo's reign) and Cosmas was beheaded.

== See also ==
- Basil Onomagoulos
- Tiberius Petasius
