= 730 =

Calendar year

730 in various calendars
- Gregorian calendar: 730; DCCXXX
- Ab urbe condita: 1483
- Armenian calendar: 179; ԹՎ ՃՀԹ
- Assyrian calendar: 5480
- Balinese saka calendar: 651–652
- Bengali calendar: 136–137
- Berber calendar: 1680
- Buddhist calendar: 1274
- Burmese calendar: 92
- Byzantine calendar: 6238–6239
- Chinese calendar: 己巳年 (Earth Snake); 3427 or 3220 — to — 庚午年 (Metal Horse); 3428 or 3221
- Coptic calendar: 446–447
- Discordian calendar: 1896
- Ethiopian calendar: 722–723
- Hebrew calendar: 4490–4491
- Hindu calendars
- Vikram Samvat: 786–787
- Shaka Samvat: 651–652
- Kali Yuga: 3830–3831
- Holocene calendar: 10730
- Iranian calendar: 108–109
- Islamic calendar: 111–112
- Japanese calendar: Tenpyō 2 (天平２年)
- Javanese calendar: 623–624
- Julian calendar: 730; DCCXXX
- Korean calendar: 3063
- Minguo calendar: 1182 before ROC 民前1182年
- Nanakshahi calendar: −738
- Seleucid era: 1041/1042 AG
- Thai solar calendar: 1272–1273
- Tibetan calendar: ས་མོ་སྦྲུལ་ལོ་ (female Earth-Snake); 856 or 475 or −297 — to — ལྕགས་ཕོ་རྟ་ལོ་ (male Iron-Horse); 857 or 476 or −296

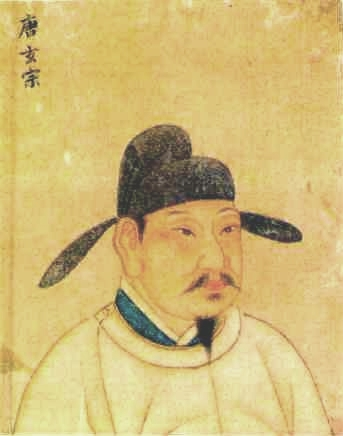
Emperor Xuan Zong (Li Longji) (685–762)

Year 730 (DCCXXX) was a common year starting on Sunday of the Julian calendar. The denomination 730 for this year has been used since the early medieval period, when the Anno Domini calendar era became the prevalent method in Europe for naming years.

== Events ==
=== By place ===
==== Europe ====
- King Liutprand contracts an alliance with Eutychius, exarch of Ravenna, and agrees to support him in his attack on Rome, while subjugating the independent southern Lombard duchies of Benevento and Spoleto.
- Tiberius Petasius proclaims himself emperor in Tuscia. Eutychius defeats him with the support of Pope Gregory II, and Tiberius is killed in Monterano, with his head sent to the Byzantine emperor Leo III as a gift.
- Charles Martel defeats the last independent dukedom of Alamannia, and incorporates it into the Frankish Empire. He also launches raids on the Saxons beyond the Rhine.

==== Arabian Empire ====
- September–October – Umayyad forces sack the Byzantine fortress of Charsianon in central Anatolia (modern Turkey), which remains a contested stronghold during the next century of Byzantine–Arab warfare.
- December 9 – Battle of Marj Ardabil: The Khazars under Barjik invade the provinces of Jibal and Adharybaydjian. He defeats an Umayyad army (25,000 men) at Ardabil (Iran), killing al-Jarrah ibn Abdallah.

==== China ====
- Emperor Xuan Zong has four palace walls in the northeast sector of the capital city Chang'an dismantled and reassembled to construct a new Daoist abbey, the grounds of which are formally a large garden for the Bureau of Agriculture.

=== By topic ===
- In this decade hops are first cultivated in Germany, in the Hallertau region.

==== Religion ====
- Leo III of the Byzantine Empire orders the destruction of all icons, beginning the First Iconoclastic Period. Many monks flee to Greece and Italy (taking smaller icons with them, hidden in their clothing); others flee to the caves of the Cappadocian desert.

== Births ==
- Al-Rabi' ibn Yunus, Arab minister (approximate date)
- Autpert Ambrose, Frankish Benedictine monk (d. 784)
- Beatus of Liébana, monk and theologian (approximate date)
- Jia Dan, general of the Tang dynasty (d. 805)
- Offa of Mercia (approximate date)
- Tarasios, patriarch of Constantinople (approximate date)
- Zhang Xiaozhong, general of the Tang Dynasty (d. 791)

== Deaths ==
- December 9 – Al-Jarrah ibn Abdallah, Arab general
- Corbinian, Frankish bishop (approximate date)
- Hugh of Champagne, grandson of Pepin of Herstal
- Lanfredus, duke of Alamannia
- Peter, duke of Cantabria
- Selbach mac Ferchair, king of Dál Riata
- Tiberius Petasius, Byzantine usurper
- Yuwen Rong, chancellor of the Tang Dynasty (or 731)
