= Papyrus Oxyrhynchus 128 =

Greek manuscript

Papyrus Oxyrhynchus 128 (P. Oxy. 128 or P. Oxy. I 128) is a letter containing the resignation of a secretary, written in Greek and discovered in Oxyrhynchus. The manuscript was written on papyrus in the form of a sheet. The document was written in the 6th or 7th century. Currently it is housed in the Egyptian Museum (10121) in Cairo.

== Description ==
The recto side of the document contains a letter addressed by three people to an official, informing him that a chartoularios named Pamouthius wishes to resign his office on account of his poor health. The verso side contains accounts. The measurements of the fragment are 305 by 180 mm.

It was discovered by Grenfell and Hunt in 1897 in Oxyrhynchus. The text was published by Grenfell and Hunt in 1898.

== Text ==
His honor Pamouthius the secretary on the plea of bodily infirmity has expressed the desire to retire from his duties and take rest. Learning of this, we (for it happened that I, John, was then at Oxyrhynchus) visited him in his house and were very importunate with him to do no such thing and not to make any resolution without reference to the opinion and decision of your excellency. We could not however persuade him to listen to our request in any other way than by offering and pledging ourselves to refer his case by letter to your excellency. He insists that he is unable to bear such a strain, and begs to be bidden to come to your excellency's feet in order that you may judge of his present condition. Let your excellency therefore be pleased to write back your wishes, either persuading his worship to stay at his post and do his regular work or ordering him to come to your excellency's feet. In the forefront of this letter we would place our due and fitting obeisance to your excellency.

== See also ==
- Oxyrhynchus Papyri
- Papyrus Oxyrhynchus 127
- Papyrus Oxyrhynchus 129
