= Papyrus Oxyrhynchus 129 =

Ancient Greek manuscript

Papyrus Oxyrhynchus 129 (P. Oxy. 129 or P. Oxy. I 129) is a formal repudiation of a betrothal, written in Greek and discovered in Oxyrhynchus. The manuscript was written on papyrus in the form of a sheet. The document was written in the 6th century. Currently it is housed in the Egyptian Museum (10082) in Cairo.

== Description ==
The document is a formal notice, written by John, breaking off the engagement between his daughter Euphemia and her fiance, Phoebammon, because of Phoebammon's misconduct. The signature of the father, in a sloping uncial hand, is placed at the end. The beginning of the document is incomplete, although Grenfell and Hunt state that probably not much more than part of the date is missing. The measurements of the fragment are 257 by 408 mm.

It was discovered by Grenfell and Hunt in 1897 in Oxyrhynchus. The text was published by Grenfell and Hunt in 1898.

== Text ==
... eleventh indiction. I, John, father of Euphemia, my unemancipated daughter, do send this present deed of separation and dissolution to you, Phoebammon, my most honorable son-in-law, by the hand of the most illustrious advocate Anastasius of this city of Oxyrhynchus. It is as follows. Forasmuch as it has come to my ears that you are giving yourself over to lawless deeds, which are pleasing to neither God nor man, and are not fit to be put into writing, I think it well that the engagement between you and her, my daughter Euphemia, should be dissolved, seeing that, as is aforesaid, I have heard that you are giving yourself over to lawless deeds and that I wish my daughter to lead a peaceful and quiet life. I therefore send you the present deed of dissolution of the engagement between you and her, my daughter Euphemia, by the hand of the most illustrious advocate aforesaid with my own signature, and I have taken a copy of this document, written by the hand of the most illustrious advocate aforesaid. Wherefore for the security of the said Euphemia my daughter I send you this deed of separation and dissolution written on the 11th day of the month Epeiph in the 11th indiction.

[In second hand] I, John, the aforesaid, father of Euphemia, my daughter, send the present deed of separation and dissolution to you, Phoebammon, my most honorable son-in-law, as is above written.

== See also ==
- Oxyrhynchus Papyri
- Papyrus Oxyrhynchus 128
- Papyrus Oxyrhynchus 130
