= Papyrus Oxyrhynchus 125 =

Ancient Greek manuscript

Papyrus Oxyrhynchus 125 (P. Oxy. 125 or P. Oxy. I 125) is a declaration on oath, written in Greek and discovered in Oxyrhynchus. The manuscript was written on papyrus in the form of a sheet. The document was written on 13 December 560. Currently it is housed in the Egyptian Museum (10062) in Cairo.

== Description ==
The document contains a declaration on oath, made by Aurelius Pambechis to the chief of the treasury of Oxyrhynchus. He ensures the chief against any loss or annoyance which he might incur by standing as surety for Pambechis on his appointment to an official post. Grenfell and Hunt speculate that such a guarantee by a public officer was a condition of such an appointment. The measurements of the fragment are 220 by 243 mm.

It was discovered by Grenfell and Hunt in 1897 in Oxyrhynchus. The text was published by Grenfell and Hunt in 1898.

== See also ==
- Oxyrhynchus Papyri
- Papyrus Oxyrhynchus 124
- Papyrus Oxyrhynchus 126
