= Papyrus Oxyrhynchus 126 =

Greek papyrus fragment

Papyrus Oxyrhynchus 126 (P. Oxy. 126 or P. Oxy. I 126) is a notice to a revenue officer, written in Greek and discovered in Oxyrhynchus. The manuscript was written on papyrus in the form of a sheet. The document was written on 10 May 572. Currently it is housed in the Egyptian Museum (10085) in Cairo.

== Description ==
The document contains a notification by Stephanous, with the consent of her husband Marcus (a "chief physician") to a revenue officer. Stephanous agrees that she will, in the future, pay in full or in part some annual fees paid to date by her father, John, in consideration of her having received from him a gift of land as a dowry. The measurements of the fragment are 313 by 305 millimetres (12.3 in × 12.0 in).

It was discovered by Grenfell and Hunt in 1897 in Oxyrhynchus. The text was published by Grenfell and Hunt in 1898.

== See also ==
- Oxyrhynchus Papyri
- Papyrus Oxyrhynchus 125
- Papyrus Oxyrhynchus 127
