= Pseudo-John IV Laskaris =

Byzantine usurper

Pseudo-John IV Laskaris was a Byzantine man who claimed to be John IV Laskaris and attempted to usurp the ruling emperor, Michael VIII Palaiologos, in 1262.

== Biography ==
Michael VIII Palaiologos blinded the young Byzantine monarch John IV Laskaris in 1261, making him ineligible to remain on the throne. The act outraged the Byzantine elite and clergy; as a result, Michael was excommunicated by Patriarch Arsenius Autoreianos. The historian George Pachymeres wrote that a man claiming to be John IV caused an uprising at Nicaea, forcing Michael to drag out the real John IV to disprove the pretender's claims. The pretender fled and eventually disappeared from the historical record, though he served as a precursor to several other "Pseudo-Johns" who would appear in later decades.

== See also ==
- List of Byzantine usurpers
