= Papyrus Oxyrhynchus 127 =

Greek papyrus fragment

Papyrus Oxyrhynchus 127 (P. Oxy. 127 or P. Oxy. I 127) is an account of contributions of wheat sent annually to Alexandria and Constantinople, written in Greek and discovered in Oxyrhynchus. The manuscript was written on papyrus in the form of a sheet. The document was written in the late 6th century. Currently it is housed in the Egyptian Museum (10084) in Cairo.

== Description ==
The recto side of the manuscript contains an account of the contributions made by the oikoi (οἶκοι) of Oxyrhynchus and Cynopolis towards the annual wheat supply (ἐμβολή) sent to Alexandria and Constantinople. The verso side is a list of payments in two columns. The measurements of the fragment are 250 by 239 mm.

It was discovered by Grenfell and Hunt in 1897 in Oxyrhynchus. The text was published by Grenfell and Hunt in 1898.

== See also ==
- Oxyrhynchus Papyri
- Papyrus Oxyrhynchus 126
- Papyrus Oxyrhynchus 128
