= Papyrus Oxyrhynchus 130 =

Greek manuscript

Papyrus Oxyrhynchus 130 (P. Oxy. 130 or P. Oxy. I 130) is a letter asking for relief from a debt, written in Greek and discovered in Oxyrhynchus. The manuscript was written on papyrus in the form of a sheet. The document was written in the 6th century. Currently it is housed in the Egyptian Museum (10072) in Cairo.

== Description ==
The document contains a letter from Anoup to Apion, patrician and dux of the Thebaid. Anoup asks Apion to allow him indulgence in regard to a debt which he is currently unable to pay. Grenfell and Hunt note that it is possible that this Apion is the same as the Flavius Apion mentioned in Oxyrhynchus Papyri 133–139. However, the identification is not certain because Flavius Apion is not given the title of dux in those manuscripts. The measurements of the fragment are 318 by 240 mm.

It was discovered by Grenfell and Hunt in 1897 in Oxyrhynchus. The text was published by Grenfell and Hunt in 1898.

== Text ==
To Apion my kind lord, lover of Christ and the poor, all-esteemed and most magnificent patrician and dux of the Thebaid, from Anoup, your miserable slave upon your estate called Phakra. No injustice or wickedness has ever attached to the glorious house of my kind lord, but it is ever full of mercy and overflowing to supply the needs of others. Therefore I, your miserable slave, desire by this petition for mercy to bring it to your lordship's knowledge that I serve my kind lord as my fathers and forefathers did and pay the taxes every year. But by the will of God in the past 10th and 11th indiction years my cattle died, and I borrowed a considerable sum—amounting to 15 solidi—in order to be able to buy the same number of cattle again. Yet when I approached my kind lord and asked for pity in my straits, the servants of my lord refused to do my kind lord's bidding. For unless your pity extends to me, my lord, I cannot stay on my holding and serve the interests of the estate. But I beseech and urge your lordship to command that mercy should be shown me because of the disaster that has overtaken me. For I have no other refuge than in the Lord Christ and your eminence. And I will send up unceasing hymns to the Lord Christ for the life of your lordship and that of your most magnificent son, my lord Strategius.

== See also ==
- Oxyrhynchus Papyri
- Papyrus Oxyrhynchus 129
- Papyrus Oxyrhynchus 131
