= Papyrus Oxyrhynchus 124 =

Ancient Greek student's manuscript

Papyrus Oxyrhynchus 124 (P. Oxy. 124 or P. Oxy. I 124) is a student's composition, written in Greek and discovered in Oxyrhynchus. The manuscript was written on papyrus in the form of a sheet. The document was written in the 3rd century. Currently it is housed in the library of Winchester College in Winchester.

== Description ==
The verso side of the document contains a student's exercise. The recto side contains part of a 2nd- or 3rd-century account. The exercise on the verso is written in a large and sprawling uncial hand. It is the beginning of a report on Adrastus, a legendary king of Argos. The measurements of the fragment are 80 by 137 mm.

It was discovered by Grenfell and Hunt in 1897 in Oxyrhynchus. The text was published by Grenfell and Hunt in 1898.

== Text ==
Adrastus, king of Argos, married one of his own rank and had two daughters, Deïpyle and Aegialia, who, though not ugly, were unlucky as to marriage; for no suitors offered themselves. Adrastus therefore sent to Delphi and inquired the cause.

== See also ==
- Oxyrhynchus Papyri
- Papyrus Oxyrhynchus 123
- Papyrus Oxyrhynchus 125
