= Raiktor =

Eastern Orthodox monk

Raiktor or Raictor was an Eastern Orthodox monk who assumed the identity of Byzantine Emperor Michael VII. He participated in the Norman campaigns of Robert Guiscard to overthrow the Byzantine Empire.

== Background ==
By 1081, the Byzantine Empire was in a state of chaos. Alexios I Komnenos had just overthrown Nikephoros III Botaneiates, and was confronted with the challenge of dealing with the imminent invasion of the Balkans by Robert Guiscard, the Norman Duke of Apulia. Guiscard had used the overthrow of Emperor Michael VII by Nikephoros III in 1078 as a pretext for launching a full-scale assault against the empire. By 1081, either by a stroke of good fortune or by some creative manipulation there was waiting for him at Salerno a man who claimed to be Robert's son-in-law, the deposed emperor Michael VII.

It was soon clear that this monk, Raiktor, was not in fact the deposed emperor. Though Michael had indeed become a monk after he was deprived of his throne, by 1081 he had been elevated in the church hierarchy by becoming first a bishop and then an archbishop, and was currently residing at Constantinople. Nevertheless, it was too good an opportunity for Guiscard to resist. Needing a good pretext to launch a war that many of his nobles were unsure about, he accepted Raiktor's claims to be his imperial relative by marriage. Receiving a letter from Raiktor which stated, "Your son-in-law Michael, who has been expelled from his kingdom has arrived here to solicit your assistance", he read it privately to his wife, and then in an assembly of all the Counts he showed it to them. In it, he recounted Raiktor's tale about how he'd been robbed of his wife and son and all his possessions by the usurper Botaneiates, and that against his will he had been clothed in a monk's garb instead of wearing a crown, and that he had now appeared as a suppliant. Swearing that he would no longer be held back, his nobles all agreed to launch a war against the Eastern Roman Empire.

Declaring that because of their relationship he must restore the empire to Raiktor, daily he showed honor to the monk, continuing the charade that he was the Emperor Michael, giving him the best place at table, a higher seat, and excessive respect. Inevitably, he would commiserate himself on the sad fate of his daughter, and that because of consideration for his son-in-law, he did not like to speak about Michael's misfortune.

Not everyone was taken in by the deception. Guiscard's ambassador to Constantinople, Raoul, had just returned with news of the overthrow of Botaneiates. Laying eyes on Raiktor, he declared that the monk was an imposter, and that his story was a complete fabrication. He told Guiscard that he had seen the ex-emperor with his own eyes in Constantinople, apparently living in a monastery. At these words, the pseudo-emperor Michael became furious and began berating the Norman nobleman, unhappy that his deception had been uncovered. Guiscard, nevertheless, continued with his plans to replace Alexios with Raiktor.

== Campaigning with the Normans ==
Passing over into the Balkans, he accompanied Guiscard in the Norman's attempt to take the important city of Dyrrachium. Robert approached the city and declared he was there to restore his son-in-law Michael to the throne of Byzantium. The city governor declared that if they were to see Michael and recognize him, they would immediately open the gates and hand the city over to him. Raiktor was paraded before the city walls in a magnificent procession, escorted by soldiers and nobles, with a band playing music to accompany him. But when the city defenders saw him, they shouted insults at Raiktor, swearing that they did not recognize him. Seeing that his ruse was not working, Guiscard settled down for a lengthy siege.

Nevertheless, word soon reached Alexios that Raiktor was deceiving many people, and increasing the numbers of Guiscard's troops. He sought the aid of the Venetians, who approached Dyrrachium with all speed. When Guiscard became aware of their arrival, he sent his son Bohemund to greet them in the name of the emperor Michael and of Robert. Soon after this, Guiscard drops all mention of his son-in-law, as events in Italy soon saw him return there and Bohemund continued the campaign that Alexios eventually overcame. It is suspected that once his usefulness had passed, Raiktor was disposed of quickly and quietly.

== Identity ==
At the time, there was much discussion as to the identity of the monk. It is certain that he was a monk at the time he approached Guiscard, but prior to his taking monastic vows, it was widely believed that Raiktor was probably the cupbearer of the Emperor Michael Ducas. It is certain that he was not the ex-emperor himself.

== See also ==
- Pseudo-Alexios II
- Andriscus
- Eumenes III
- False Dmitry I
