= Constantine Bourtzes =

Byzantine usurper

Constantine Bourtzes (Greek: Κωνσταντῖνος Βούρτζης; fl. 1025) was a Byzantine aristocrat associated with a failed conspiracy against Emperor Constantine VIII following the death of emperor Basil II. He was blinded by the emperor as punishment, which had evidently occurred to a large number of Byzantine aristocrats at the time of Constantine VIII's accession to the throne. He was the son of Michael Bourtzes, who played a major role in the Byzantine reconquest of Antioch in 969 during the reign of Nikephoros II Phokas.

Bourtzes first served in the Byzantine Army as a topoteretes, before being promoted to two higher roles. He was then made doux of Antioch. He is considered to have been the "best-documented" case of rank elevation in the Byzantine infantry during his time period.
