= Nikephoros Komnenos =

Byzantine military leader

- Νικηφόρος Κομνηνός
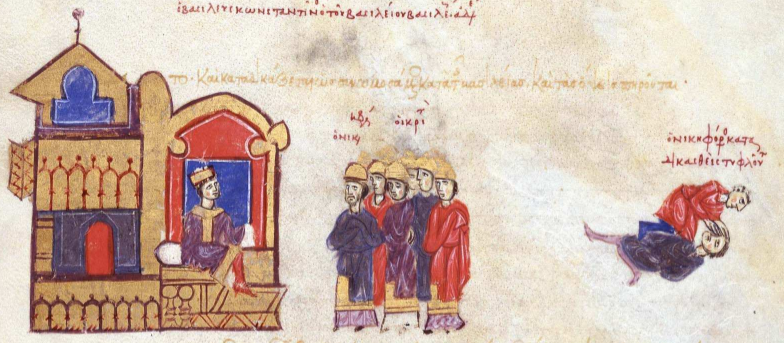
- Emperor Constantine VIII (left) orders the blinding of Nikephoros Komnenos (right), miniature from the Madrid Skylitzes
- Born: c. 970 (?)
- Died: after 1026/7
- Military career
- Rank: strategos/katepano of Vaspurakan

Nikephoros Komnenos (Greek: Νικηφόρος Κομνηνός, Nikēphoros Komnēnos; c. 970 – after 1026/7) was a Byzantine military leader under the emperors Basil II (r. 976–1025) and Constantine VIII (r. 1025–1028). He served as governor of the Armenian region of Vaspurakan, and is one of the first known members of the Komnenos family, which came to rule the Byzantine Empire in 1081–1185.

== Biography ==
Nikephoros Komnenos is one of the first documented members of the Komnenos family, but nothing is known of his early life or his connection to the main branch of the family, which eventually gave rise to the imperial dynasty. The Greek scholar Konstantinos Varzos suggested that he was born c. 970, and that he was the younger brother of the Komnenian dynasty's patriarch, Manuel Erotikos Komnenos, but neither assumption can be verified.

Nikephoros is first mentioned in the historical record in c. 1022, shortly after the King of Vaspurakan, Senekerim-Hovhannes (r. 1003–1021), unable to resist the pressure of his Muslim neighbours, surrendered his kingdom to the Byzantine emperor Basil II in exchange for large estates and the governorship of the theme of Sebasteia. Basil II initially gave the new province (Ἀσπρακανία, Asprakania, in Greek) to Basil Argyros, but was forced to replace him soon after due to his ineptitude. The protospatharios Nikephoros Komnenos was chosen to succeed Basil Argyros as governor (strategos or katepano), and swiftly managed to enforce Byzantine rule over the country. The contemporary Armenian historian Aristakes Lastivertsi records that Nikephoros captured the principality of Arzes on the northern shore of Lake Van, and incorporated it into his province, although according to the narrative of the likewise contemporary Arab Christian historian Yahya of Antioch, the feat was carried out by Emperor Basil himself.

Nikephoros Komnenos continued to serve as strategos of Vaspurakan under Basil II's brother and successor, Constantine VIII, but in 1026 he was dismissed on suspicion of disloyalty and recalled to Constantinople, where he was blinded. Two different versions are provided by the historical record on the background to his recall: the Byzantine chronicler John Skylitzes reports that he insisted on a written pledge of support from his troops, intended to be used against the neighbouring Turkish rulers, but which was interpreted by Constantine as an attempt to create a force personally loyal to him. While Skylitzes declares the accusation baseless and puts the blame on the over-suspicious Constantine, Aristakes claims that Nikephoros was indeed engaged in treasonous talks with King George I of Georgia (r. 1014–1027), aiming to either declare himself emperor, or make Vaspurakan an independent kingdom. When the troops of Cappadocia found out about it, however, they captured Nikephoros and sent him as a prisoner to Constantinople, where Constantine VIII, after carefully examining the affair and convincing himself of Nikephoros' guilt, had him and eight of his companions blinded in the next year.

His fate after that, the date of his death, as well as the existence of any descendants, are unknown.

== Sources ==
- Kazhdan, Alexander, ed. (1991). The Oxford Dictionary of Byzantium. Oxford and New York: Oxford University Press. ISBN 0-19-504652-8.
- Lilie, Ralph-Johannes; Ludwig, Claudia; Pratsch, Thomas; Zielke, Beate (2013). Prosopographie der mittelbyzantinischen Zeit Online. Berlin-Brandenburgische Akademie der Wissenschaften. Nach Vorarbeiten F. Winkelmanns erstellt (in German). Berlin and Boston: De Gruyter.
- Varzos, Konstantinos (1984). Η Γενεαλογία των Κομνηνών [The Genealogy of the Komnenoi] (PDF) (in Greek). Vol. A1. Thessaloniki: Centre for Byzantine Studies, University of Thessaloniki.
- Wortley, John, ed. (2010). John Skylitzes: A Synopsis of Byzantine History, 811–1057. Cambridge: Cambridge University Press. ISBN 978-0-521-76705-7.
