= John Spyridonakes =

Late 12th-century Byzantine governor

John Spyridonakes (Greek: Ἰωάννης Σπυριδωνάκης, fl. ca. 1195–1201) was a Byzantine governor and rebel in the region of Macedonia during the reign of Emperor Alexios III Angelos (r. 1195–1203).

Spyridonakes was born in Cyprus. Originally a low-born handicraftsman, he secured the favour of Emperor Alexios III Angelos and rose to the post of head of the imperial privy purse (the oikeiakon vestiarion). Subsequently, he was appointed governor of the theme of Smolena in eastern Macedonia. In 1201, he rebelled against the Byzantine emperor, taking advantage of a series of raids and rebellions – such as those of Dobromir Chrysos and Ivanko – then occurring in the Byzantine Empire's Balkan provinces. He was soon defeated by imperial forces under the Emperor's son-in-law Alexios Palaiologos and driven to seek refuge at the court of the Bulgarian emperor Kalojan (r. 1197–1207).

== Sources ==
- Brand, Charles M. (1968). Byzantium Confronts the West, 1180–1204. Cambridge, Massachusetts: Harvard University Press. LCCN 67-20872. OCLC 795121713.
