= Giorgius (usurper) =

Byzantine usurper

Giorgius (Greek: Γεώργιος) was a Byzantine usurper in Ravenna during the reign of Justinian II. He attempted to seize imperial authority around 710–711 CE following the murder of exarch John III Rizocopo. Justinian II was overthrown by a general who became emperor Philippicus Bardanes, during that year Giorgius disappears from the historical record. Most historians conclude that the revolt collapsed rapidly, probably before it could spread beyond Ravenna.
