= Vestiarion =

One of the major fiscal departments of the Byzantine bureaucracy

The vestiarion (Greek: βεστιάριον, from Latin: vestiarium, "wardrobe"), sometimes with the adjectives basilikon (Greek: βασιλικόν "imperial") or mega (μέγα "great"), was one of the major fiscal departments of the Byzantine bureaucracy. In English, it is often known as the department of the Public Wardrobe. Originating from the late Roman palace office of the sacrum vestiarium, it became an independent department in the 7th century under a chartoularios. By the late Byzantine period, it had become the state's sole treasury department. The public vestiarion must not be confused with the Byzantine emperor's private wardrobe, the oikeiakon vestiarion, which was headed by the prōtovestiarios.

== History and functions ==
The bureau of the sacrum vestiarium (Latin for "sacred wardrobe") is first attested as one of the scrinia under the comes sacrarum largitionum in the 5th century, and was then headed by a primicerius. In the 7th century, as the old Roman departments were broken up, the sacrum vestiarium and the bureaus of the scrinium argenti and scrinium a milarensibus, which supervised the mints, were combined to form the department of the vestiarion, under the chartoularios tou vestiariou (χαρτουλάριος τοῦ βεστιαρίου). This official is variously known in the sources also as vestiarios (βεστιάριος) and [epi tou] vestiariou ([ἐπὶ τοῦ] βεστιαρίου). The office of vestiariou, attested in the late 13th and 14th centuries by George Pachymeres and Pseudo-Kodinos, however, was apparently a distinct and independent office, which function as the paymaster of the naval ships and apparently corresponds to that of "prefect of the army" (ἔπαρχος τοῦ στρατιωτικοῦ) attested in the 6th century as army paymasters.

The vestiarion functioned parallel to the other state fiscal departments, the sakellion and the various logothesia, and was responsible for minting coin and bullion, as well as the maintenance of imperial arsenals in Constantinople and the provisioning of the imperial fleet and army. In effect, the vestiarion functioned parallel to the sakellion; salaries for instance were paid one half by each department. In the 12th century, the vestiarion became the sole state treasury, and was commonly referred to simply as the tameion ("treasury"). As such it survived into the Palaiologan period, when its chairman (prokathēmenos) was in charge of "revenue and expenditure".

== Organization ==
The information on the department's internal structure during the middle Byzantine period (late 7th-11th centuries) comes primarily from the Klētorologion of Philotheos, a list of offices compiled in 899. Under the department head, the chartoularios tou vestiariou entails:

- A number of basilikoi notarioi of the sekreton (βασιλικοί νοτάριοι τοῦ σεκρέτου), imperial notaries at the head of sub-departments, corresponding to the late Roman primiscrinii.
- A kentarchos (Greek: κένταρχος τοῦ βεστιαρίου, "centurion of the vestiarion") and a legatarios (Greek: λεγατάριος), of unknown functions.
- An archon tēs charagēs (Greek: ἄρχων τῆς χαραγῆς, "master of the mint"). The same official is probably identifiable with the chrysoepsētēs attested elsewhere in Philotheos and in the earlier Taktikon Uspensky.
- The chartoularios in charge of the exartēsis, the imperial naval arsenal. Also known as the exartistēs (Greek: ἐξαρτιστῆς).
- A number of kouratores ("curators").
- A number of chosvaētai (Greek: χοσβαῆται), of unknown functions. Their strange title may be a corruption of vestiaritai ("men of the vestiarion").
- A number of mandatores (Greek: μανδάτορες, "messengers"), under a prōtomandatōr.

== Sources ==
- Bury, John Bagnell (1911). The Imperial Administrative System of the Ninth Century - With a Revised Text of the Kletorologion of Philotheos. London: Oxford University Press.
- Failler, Albert (1987). "L'éparque de l'armée et le bestiariou". Revue des études byzantines (in French). 45: 199–203. doi:10.3406/rebyz.1987.2211.
- Haldon, John F. (1997). Byzantium in the Seventh Century: The Transformation of a Culture. Cambridge: Cambridge University Press. ISBN 978-0-521-31917-1.
- Kazhdan, Alexander, ed. (1991). The Oxford Dictionary of Byzantium. Oxford and New York: Oxford University Press. ISBN 0-19-504652-8.
- Laiou, Angeliki E., ed. (2002). The Economic History of Byzantium from the Seventh through the Fifteenth Century. Washington, District of Columbia: Dumbarton Oaks. ISBN 0-88402-288-9. Archived from the original on 2012-02-18.
