= Bardas Boilas =

Byzantine rebel

Bardas Boilas was the strategos of Chaldia. He was arrested in 923 CE for conspiring to dethrone Emperor Romanos I Lekapenos.
