= Pseudo-Alexios II =

Late 12th-century Byzantine usurper

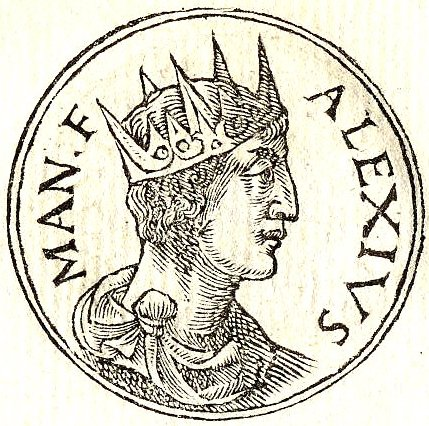
Seal depicting the Emperor Alexios II Komnenos, from the Promptuarii Iconum Insigniorum, in 1553

Pseudo-Alexios II was the name given to several pretenders to the Byzantine throne that claimed to be the young Emperor Alexios II Komnenos, who had been murdered in 1183 by his great-uncle Andronikos I Komnenos.

== Rebellions of the Pseudo-Alexioi ==
=== First Pseudo-Alexios ===
In 1185, the first Pseudo-Alexios is attested to in the Adriatic region of the empire, probably in the area around Dyrrachium. Eventually, he travelled to Sicily in an effort to raise support for his revolt.

=== Second Pseudo-Alexios ===
In 1189, during the reign of Isaac II Angelos, a second rebel from Constantinople travelled to the Meander River Valley and claimed to be Alexios II. He managed to replicate both the emperor's appearance and mannerisms, dying his hair the same yellowish brown colour and even mimicking his stammer. In the town of Armala, he convinced a certain Latin, and together they travelled to the Sultanate of Rum. In Iconium, they convinced the old sultan Kilij Arslan II and his court that he was the true emperor. According to Niketas Choniates:

Moved to honor him both by his shamelessness and his resemblance [to his so-called father], the sultan gratified him with many gifts and gladdened him with great expectations. Once, when a Roman envoy in attendance listened to the young man exalting the eminence of his noble birth, the sultan asked whether he knew him to be Emperor Manuel's son. When he answered nothing more than that this son had truly perished and in vain did the lad Alexios fabricate such falsehoods, surfacing with the name of one seen lying dead in a watery grave, the youth, who boiled with rage and was hot with wrath, would have seized the envoy bythe beard had not the latter, provoked to anger, stalwartly repulsed the false-Alexios. The sultan then admonished them for behaving ill and commanded them to remain calm. Giving in to the youth's persistent entreaties, the Turkish ruler did not even then limit his excessive demands, but issuing a special letter of the sultan which the Turks called mansur, he allowed him to enlist with impunity as many of his subjects as he could.

Pseudo-Alexios and the Latin were given gifts and allowed to raise 8,000 Turkoman warriors under Emir Arsan, in order to take the Byzantine throne. These nomads then proceeded to raid almost the whole length of the Meander River, sacking multiple towns, ravaging the region of Chonai, and destroying the Church of Archangel Michael. Due to the scale of the devastation his forces inflicted, Pseudo-Alexios was called "the Crop-Burner" (Greek: Καυσαλώνης). However, due to his resemblance to the young emperor, he still gained the support of much of the rural population.

The sebastokrator Alexios Angelos was sent to deal with the rebel, taking a defensive stance against Pseudo-Alexios, and guarding the areas not yet taken by him. Eventually, in 1191, after a drinking bout in Armala, Pseudo-Alexios had his throat cut by a local priest, using the rebel's own sword. When the head of Pseudo-Alexios was carried to the sebastokrator, seeing the resemblance to the true Alexios II, he commented that "it was not altogether out of ignorance that the cities followed this man", before sending to head to Isaac II.

=== Third Pseudo-Alexios ===
In 1191, a third Pseudoalexios appeared in Paphlagonia, but was quickly defeated by Chartularios of the Stables, Theodore Choumnos. Theodore took the rebel captive, had him whipped, and beheaded, sending the head to Isaac II.

=== Fourth Pseudo-Alexios ===
In July 1195, in Cilicia, a fourth Pseudo-Alexios appeared by the side of the Emir of Ancyra, Muhi al-Din Mas 'Udshah, and subdued the Byzantine fortresses north of the city. The new Emperor Alexios III Angelos, along with Michael Kantakouzenos, launched a two-month long campaign against him, until a conspirator assassinated the rebel at night in the fortress of Tzoungra, around 1197.

== Bibliography ==
- Choniates, Niketas (1984). Historia. English translation: Magoulias, Harry J. (O City of Byzantium: Annals of Niketas Choniates). Detroit. ISBN 0-8143-1764-2.
- Davidson, Alistair James (2017). ‘The Glory of Ruling Makes All Things Permissible’: Power and Usurpation in Byzantium: Some Aspects of Communication, Legitimacy, and Moral Authority (Thesis). University of Birmingham.
- Vryonis, Speros (1971). The Decline of Medieval Hellenism in Asia Minor and the Process of Islamization from the Eleventh through the Fifteenth Century. University of California Press. ISBN 0-520-01597-5.
