= Basil Onomagoulos =

Byzantine usurper (c. 717)

- Usurper of the Byzantine Empire
- Reign: c. 717
- Predecessor: Leo III
- Successor: Leo III
- Died: 717; Syracuse, Byzantine Sicily
Names
- Basil Onomagoulos
Regnal name
- Tiberius

Basil Onomagoulos (Greek: Βασίλειος Ὀνομάγουλος) was a Byzantine official who was declared rival emperor in Sicily in 717, taking the regnal name Tiberius (rarelly called Tiberius V).

== Biography ==
Basil was from Constantinople, the son of a certain Gregory Onomagoulos. In 717 he was a member of the entourage of Sergius, the Byzantine governor of Sicily, when news arrived to the island of the fall of Constantinople, the Byzantine imperial capital, to an Arab siege. At this point Sergius declared Basil as emperor, taking the name Tiberius. The Emperor Leo III the Isaurian (r. 717–741) however quickly dispatched a chartoularios named Paul, whom he named patrikios and strategos of Sicily, with a few men and imperial instructions for the army. On his arrival, the people of Syracuse and the army surrendered the rebels. Basil and his head general were beheaded and their heads sent to the emperor, while the other rebels were tonsured or mutilated and exiled. Sergius himself managed to escape to the Lombards in mainland Italy, and returned only after he received guarantees that no harm would befall him.

== Sources ==
- Kaegi, Walter Emil (1981), Byzantine Military Unrest, 471–843: An Interpretation, Amsterdam: Adolf M. Hakkert, p. 211, ISBN 90-256-0902-3
- Lilie, Ralph-Johannes; Ludwig, Claudia; Pratsch, Thomas; Zielke, Beate (1999). "Basileios Onomagulos (#849)". Prosopographie der mittelbyzantinischen Zeit: 1. Abteilung (641–867), Band 1: Aaron (# 1) – Georgios (# 2182) (in German). Berlin and Boston: De Gruyter. pp. 284–285. ISBN 978-3-11-015179-4.
- Turtledove, Harry (1982), The chronicle of Theophanes: an English translation of anni mundi 6095–6305 (A.D. 602–813), University of Pennsylvania Press, pp. 90–91, ISBN 978-0-8122-1128-3
