= Sabas Asidenos =

Sabas or Sabbas Asidenos (Greek: Σάβ[β]ας Ἀσιδηνός, fl. 1204–1216) was a powerful local magnate of the region of Sampson (ancient Priene in Ionia) in the early 13th century. Following the Fourth Crusade, he established himself as an independent ruler before submitting to the Empire of Nicaea.

Older historians, such as George Finlay and William Miller had identified his city with Amisos or Samsun on the Black Sea coast, and thought Sabas had his base there; however in a 1935 article, G. de Jerphanion proved that his center of power was Sampson on the coast of the Aegean Sea.

== Biography ==
The origin of Asidenos is unknown. In 1204, like other powerful magnates (e.g. Theodore Mangaphas or Leo Sgouros), he used the power vacuum created by the fall of the Byzantine imperial capital of Constantinople to the Fourth Crusade, to seize control of Sampson and the lower valley of the Maeander River. In late 1205 or early 1206, however, he was forced to recognize the sovereignty of the major Anatolian Byzantine successor realm, the Empire of Nicaea headed by Theodore I Laskaris (r. 1204–1222). Asidenos submitted peacefully and maintained his local influence, possibly acting as the region's governor.

His relations with the Nicaean ruler became close, and Asidenos apparently married into the Laskarid dynasty, for in 1214 he is addressed by Theodore I as sympetheros ("relative-in-law"), and he is recorded as holding the title of sebastokrator, at the time usually restricted to the Byzantine emperor's brothers. Asidenos is mentioned again in 1216, in a document from a monastery in Mount Latmos. Nothing is known of him thereafter.

== Sources ==
- Brand, Charles M. (1991). "Asidenos, Sabas". In Kazhdan, Alexander (ed.). The Oxford Dictionary of Byzantium. Oxford and New York: Oxford University Press. p. 207. ISBN 0-19-504652-8.
- Vougiouklaki, Penelope (20 February 2003). "Sabas Asidenos". Encyclopaedia of the Hellenic World, Asia Minor. Athens, Greece: Foundation of the Hellenic World.
