= Tiberius Petasius =

- Usurper of the Byzantine Empire
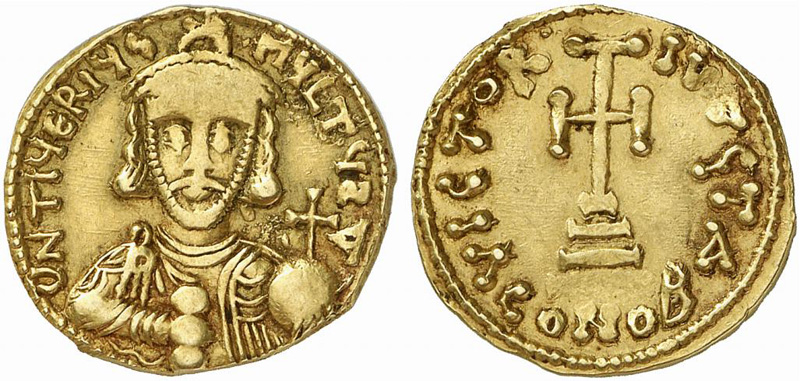
- Solidus minted in Tiberius' name
- Reign: c.730/731
- Predecessor: Leo III
- Successor: Leo III
- Died: 730/731
Names
- Petasius
Regnal name
- Tiberius

Tiberius Petasius rarely called Tiberius V was a Byzantine usurper in Italy c.730/731.

== History ==
Very little of Tiberius' life is known, other than that he was born Petasius, and that he revolted against the Byzantine Emperor Leo III the Isaurian (r. 717–741) in either 730 or 731, in Tuscia, Italy, taking the regnal name Tiberius. It is possible that he was acclaimed as emperor by local Italian assemblies, who subsequently lost heart when the rebellion of Agallianos Kontoskeles in Greece was crushed. Tiberius gained the allegiance of several towns near Tuscia, including Castrum Manturianense (identified by the historian Ludovico Muratori as modern-day Barbarano Romano), Blera, and Luna (modern-day location unknown, but likely not the Luna in northern Etruria); Tiberius based himself out of Castrum Manturianense.

The Exarch of Ravenna, Eutychius (r. c.727 – 751), was sent to suppress Tiberius' revolt. Eutychius was short on manpower, thus Pope Gregory II (r. 715–731), who did not support Leo III, but opposed the creation of rival emperors, sent several bishops, as well as Papal forces to support Eutychius. Their combined armies marched to Castrum Manturianense, crushed the rebellion in battle, and killed Tiberius. After killing Tiberius, Eutychius sent his head to Leo III.

The issue of Iconoclasm may have played a part in Tiberius' revolt, with Tiberius deriving support from Italians who opposed Leo III's iconoclastic policies, although the only source which states that the anti-Iconoclastic sentiment of the Italians was related to the revolt of Tiberius comes from a much later anti-Iconoclast.
