= Chartoularios =

Late Roman and Byzantine administrative official

The chartoularios or chartularius (Ancient Greek: χαρτουλάριος), Anglicized as chartulary, was a late Roman and Byzantine administrative official, entrusted with administrative and fiscal duties, either as a subaltern official of a department or province or at the head of various independent bureaus.

== History ==
The title derives from Latin chartulārius from charta (ultimately from Greek χάρτης chartēs), a term used for official documents, and is attested from 326, when chartularii were employed in the chanceries (scrinia) of the senior offices of the Roman state (the praetorian prefecture, the officium of the magister militum, etc.). Originally lowly clerks, by the 6th century they had risen in importance, to the extent that Peter the Patrician, when distinguishing between civil and military officials, calls the former chartoularikoi. From the 7th century on, chartoularioi could be either employed as heads of departments within a fiscal department (sekreton or logothesion), as heads of independent departments, or in the thematic (provincial) and tagmatic administration, although the occasional appointment of chartoularioi at the head of armies is also recorded. The ecclesiastic counterpart was called a chartophylax, and both terms were sometimes used interchangeably.

== Chartoularioi ==
- The chartoularioi tou [oxeos] dromou (χαρτουλάριοι τοῦ [ὀξέος] δρόμου, "chartularies of the course"), subaltern officials in the department of the dromos ("the Course") under the logothetēs tou dromou.
- The so-called chartoularioi megaloi tou sekretou (χαρτουλάριοι μεγάλοι τοῦ σεκρέτου, "grand chartularies of the department"), as heads of the various bureaus of the department of the genikon ("the General [Fisc]"), and the chartoularioi tōn arklōn (χαρτουλάριοι τῶν ἀρκλῶν) or exō chartoularioi (ἔξω χαρτουλάριοι, "outer chartularies") as the senior treasury officials posted in the provinces ("outer" meaning outside Constantinople).
- The chartoularios tou oikistikou (χαρτουλάριος τοῦ οἰκιστικοῦ) or simply ho oikistikos, whose precise functions are unknown, is also attested under the genikon; it did become an independent bureau by the 11th century, but disappears after that. It is recorded that he was in charge of tax exemptions, and had various juridical duties in some themata in the 11th century; the office may have been associated with the imperial domains (oikoi).
- The chartoularioi [megaloi] tou sekretou (χαρτουλάριοι [μεγάλοι] τοῦ σεκρέτου), as the senior subaltern officials of the department of the logothetēs toū stratiōtikou, who supervised the military fisc, and further chartoularioi of the individual themata (χαρτουλάριοι τῶν θεμάτων) and tagmata (χαρτουλάριοι τῶν ταγμάτων), supervising the financial affairs of the thematic troops and the imperial tagmata, respectively.
- The chartoularios tou sakelliou (χαρτουλάριος τοῦ σακελλίου), in charge of the Sakellion treasury.
- The chartoularios tou vestiariou (χαρτουλάριος τοῦ βεστιαρίου), in charge of the Vestiarion treasury.
- The chartoularios tou kanikleiou (χαρτουλάριος τοῦ κανικλείου), in charge of the imperial inkpot (the kanikleion), a post given to one of the most trusted aides of the Byzantine emperor.
- The chartoularios tou stablou (χαρτουλάριος τοῦ στάβλου, "chartulary of the stable"), initially a subaltern official under the komēs tou stablou ("Count of the Stable"), in the 11th century the epithet megas was added and he became head of his department, supervising the imperial stud farms (mētata or chartoularata) in the Balkans and Asia Minor and being responsible for the provisioning of the imperial baggage train. A further chartoularios, in charge of the large army encampment (aplēkton) at Malagina (χαρτουλάριος τῶν Μαλαγίνων), was subordinated to him.
- Two chartoularioi, one for each of the two dēmoi, the Blues and Greens, of the Byzantine capital, Constantinople.
- The megas chartoularios was a Palaiologan-era honorary court title, recorded by pseudo-Kodinos, which entailed no specific office or function.

== Sources ==
- Bury, John Bagnell (1911). The Imperial Administrative System of the Ninth Century - With a Revised Text of the Kletorologion of Philotheos. London: Oxford University Press.
- Haldon, John (1999). Warfare, State and Society in the Byzantine World, 565–1204. London: UCL Press. ISBN 1-85728-495-X.
- Kazhdan, Alexander, ed. (1991). The Oxford Dictionary of Byzantium. Oxford and New York: Oxford University Press. ISBN 0-19-504652-8.
