= John Doukas (sebastokrator) =

Byzantine nobleman and general

- Sebastokrator
- Born: c. 1125/27
- Died: c. 1200
- Noble family: Komnenodoukas branch of the Angelos dynasty
- Spouses: Possible first wife Zoe Doukaina
- Issue Detail: Isaac Angelos; Alexios Komnenos Doukas; Theodore Komnenos Doukas; Manuel Doukas; Constantine Komnenos Doukas; Theodora (?); Irene (?); Anna (?); Michael I Komnenos Doukas
- Father: Constantine Angelos
- Mother: Theodora Komnene

John Doukas, Latinized as Ducas (Greek: Ἰωάννης Δούκας, romanized: Iōannēs Doukas; c. 1125/27 – c. 1200), was the eldest son of Constantine Angelos by Theodora Komnene, the seventh child of the Byzantine Emperor Alexios I Komnenos and Irene Doukaina. John Doukas took the family name of his grandmother Irene. He served as a military commander under Manuel I Komnenos and Isaac II Angelos. Isaac II, who was Doukas's nephew, raised him to the high rank of sebastokrator. Despite his advanced age, he continued to be an active general in the 1180s and 1190s, and until shortly before his death aspired to the imperial throne. He was the progenitor of the Komnenos Doukas line, which founded the Despotate of Epirus after the Fourth Crusade.

== Life ==
=== Origin ===
John was eldest son of the founder of the Angelos line, Constantine Angelos from Philadelphia, by Theodora Komnene, the seventh child of the Byzantine Emperor Alexios I Komnenos (r. 1081–1118) and Empress Irene Doukaina. The couple, who married in c. 1122 (1110/15 according to Polemis), had four sons and three daughters, of whom two, John and Andronikos (the father of the future emperors Isaac II Angelos and Alexios III Angelos), preferred to use their grandmother's far more prestigious surname of Doukas to their father's surname. The date of John's birth is unknown, and the only reference to his age is that in 1185 he was already an old man. The genealogist of the Komnenian family, Konstantinos Varzos, put his birth date approximately in 1125/27.

=== Under Manuel I and Andronikos I ===
John Doukas is first attested in the sources in March 1166, participating alongside his brothers in a church synod called to adjudicate on the interpretation of the saying of Jesus Christ "the Father is greater than I". In 1176, along with his younger brother Andronikos, he participated as a regiment commander in the campaign against the Seljuk Sultanate of Iconium that led to the Byzantine defeat in the Battle of Myriokephalon. During the battle, he was tasked by Emperor Manuel I Komnenos (r. 1143–1180) with pushing back the Seljuk Turks, who had encircled the Byzantine army and were raining arrows upon it, but after a charge against them he turned back without much success.

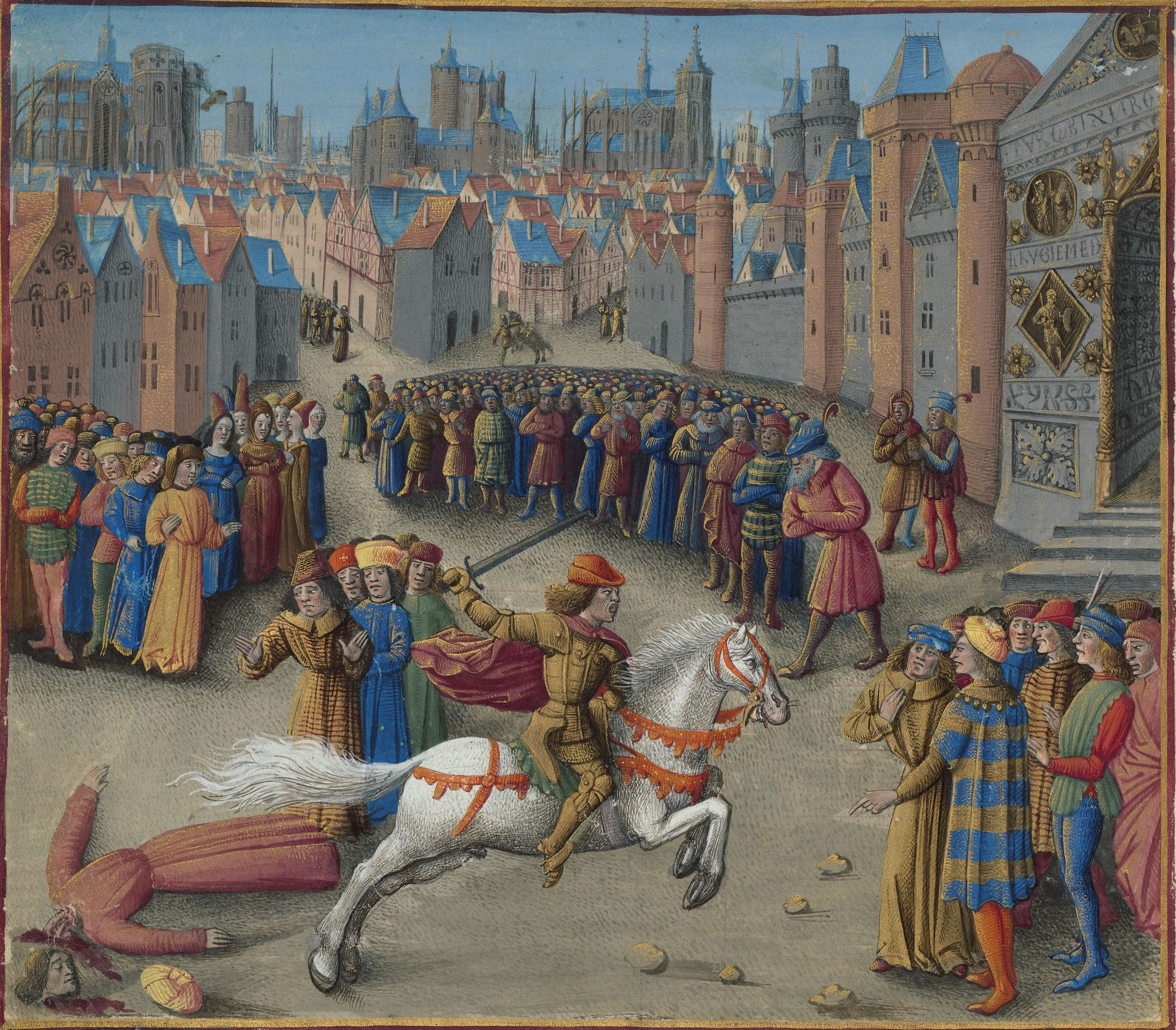
Killing of Hagiochristophorites, miniature by Jean Colombe in Les Passages d'outremer (c. 1473), BNF.

Like most of his noble relatives, John opposed the tyrannical regime of Andronikos I Komnenos (r. 1182–1185), and had been forced to sign written pledge of loyalty to the emperor. Nevertheless, on 11 September 1185, when his nephew Isaac Angelos killed Andronikos I's chief henchman, Stephen Hagiochristophorites, and sought sanctuary in the Hagia Sophia cathedral, John and his eldest son Isaac rushed to his side, fearing the Emperor's retribution. By the next day, a popular uprising provoked by Isaac Angelos' act of defiance had brought down the regime of Andronikos I, but Isaac Angelos hesitated to be crowned emperor. According to Niketas Choniates and Theodore Skoutariotes, John then bared his own head and offered his own bald head to be crowned, but the assembled people violently opposed this, refusing to be ruled by a man so old after the equally elderly Andronikos I, and Isaac Angelos was crowned.

=== Under Isaac II and Alexios III ===
The rise of his nephew to the throne nevertheless brought John to the foremost ranks of Byzantine aristocracy, and he received the exalted title of sebastokrator. Despite his advanced age, John was active as a field commander during the reign of Isaac Angelos. Niketas Choniates notes him attending the emperor at the court at Cypsele during the campaign against the Italo-Norman invasion in 1185. There John Doukas ordered Asen to be slapped on the face for the latter's insolent speech in front of the emperor and thus prompted the events leading to the Vlach-Bulgarian rebellion later the same year. In 1186, he assumed the overall command of the Byzantine army against the Vlach-Bulgarian rebellion. Although according to Choniates he displayed some skill and was able to contain the rebels, he was soon relieved of command because Isaac Angelos suspected him of designs on the throne, and entrusted the blind general John Kantakouzenos with command instead. In 1191, John once more went to the field, accompanying his nephew in an expedition against the Bulgarian rebels as commander of the rear guard. The campaign was a disastrous failure, but John was able to extricate himself and the troops under his command without losses. In the same year, he was a participant in the synod that accepted the resignation of Dositheus, the Patriarch of Constantinople. He is recorded in the synodal acts as the senior-most of the imperial relatives.

Nevertheless, Isaac Angelos still suspected him of imperial ambitions, especially due to his uncle's close contacts with the general Alexios Branas, who had rebelled in 1187: shortly before the general's rebellion, John Doukas had wed his eldest son Isaac with one of the general's daughters. Whatever the truth of Isaac Angelos' suspicions, John was quick to recognize his other nephew Alexios Angelos, when the latter usurped the throne in April 1195, and played a prominent role in Alexios' coronation ceremony. John Doukas is mentioned for the last time in 1199, when the death of both of Alexios III's sons-in-law, Andronikos Komnenos and Isaac Komnenos, opened the issue of the succession, as Alexios III had no male descendants. Despite his age, John Doukas apparently still hoped to rise on the throne, leading to quarrels with another of his nephews, Manuel Kamytzes, and the other imperial relatives. John Doukas probably died soon after that, c. 1200, at a very advanced age for his time.

== Family ==
It is unclear whether John Doukas married once or twice. The name of only one wife, Zoe Doukaina, is known. She was the daughter of Constantine Doukas and Anna Doukaina, whose exact identity is unclear. If he married twice, then his first marriage took place c. 1150, and his unknown first wife must have died c. 1165. If Zoe Doukaina was indeed his second wife, this marriage took place c. 1170.

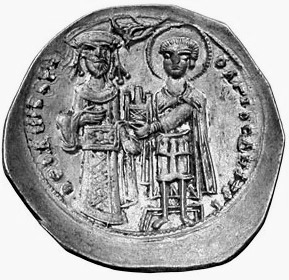
Electrum coin of John's son Theodore (left) as Emperor of Thessalonica, blessed by the city's patron, St. Demetrius

John Doukas had five legitimate sons, of whom the first two may have been the result of his first marriage, while the latter were certainly the sons of Zoe Doukaina. He also had three daughters, in all likelihood with Zoe Doukaina, and a bastard son with a concubine. These children were:

- Isaac Angelos (c. 1155 – 1203), married the daughter of Alexios Branas, perhaps named Eudokia. He was probably killed in the battles against the Fourth Crusade in 1203.
- Alexios Komnenos Doukas (c. 1160 – unknown), blinded by Andronikos I, entrusted with a campaign against Isaac Komnenos of Cyprus in 1187, but taken prisoner by Isaac and the Sicilian admiral Margaritus of Brindisi.
- Theodore Komnenos Doukas (c. 1180/85 – after 1253), married Maria Petraliphaina, second ruler of the Epirote state after 1215, crowned emperor in Thessalonica in 1227/28, captive of the Bulgarians after the Battle of Klokotnitsa in 1230, released c. 1237 and recovered Thessalonica. He died a captive at the court of the Empire of Nicaea.
- Manuel Doukas (c. 1186/88 – 1241), named Despot by his brother Theodore, ruler of Thessalonica 1230–37, and of Thessaly 1239–41.
- Constantine Komnenos Doukas (c. 1172 – c. 1242), named Despot by his brother Theodore, ruler of Aetolia and Acarnania.
- Anonymous daughter, possibly named Theodora (c. 1178 – unknown), married a Kantakouzenos, possibly Michael Kantakouzenos.
- Anonymous daughter, possibly named Irene (c. 1180/88 – unknown), possibly governed Corfu after 1237 on behalf of her brother Manuel.
- Anonymous daughter, possibly named Anna (c. 1190 – unknown), either she or, more likely, her daughter, married in 1227 Matthew Orsini, Count palatine of Cephalonia.
- Michael I Komnenos Doukas (c. 1170 – c. 1215), the bastard son, founder of the Epirote state after the Fourth Crusade, which he ruled until his death.

== Sources ==
- Choniates, Nicetas (1984). O City of Byzantium, Annals of Niketas Choniatēs. Translated by Harry J. Magoulias. Detroit: Wayne State University Press. ISBN 0-8143-1764-2.
- Polemis, Demetrios I. (1968). The Doukai: A Contribution to Byzantine Prosopography. London: The Athlone Press.
- Varzos, Konstantinos (1984). Η Γενεαλογία των Κομνηνών [The Genealogy of the Komnenoi] (PDF) (in Greek). Vol. A2. Thessaloniki: Centre for Byzantine Studies, University of Thessaloniki.
- Varzos, Konstantinos (1984). Η Γενεαλογία των Κομνηνών [The Genealogy of the Komnenoi] (PDF) (in Greek). Vol. B. Thessaloniki: Centre for Byzantine Studies, University of Thessaloniki.
