= Theodora Komnene (daughter of Alexios I) =

12th-century Byzantine noblewoman

- Born: 15 January 1096; Constantinople (modern-day Istanbul, Turkey)
- Died: unknown
- Spouse: Constantine Kourtikes; Constantine Angelos
- Issue: John Doukas; Alexios Komnenos Angelos; Andronikos Doukas Angelos; Isaac Angelos; Maria Angelina; Eudokia Angelina; Zoe Angelina
- House: Komnenos
- Father: Alexios I Komnenos
- Mother: Irene Doukaina
- Religion: Orthodox

Theodora Komnene (Greek: Θεοδώρα Κομνηνή; born 15 January 1096) was a Byzantine noblewoman, being the fourth daughter of Emperor Alexios I Komnenos and Irene Doukaina. She married Constantine Angelos, by whom she had seven children. Byzantine emperors Alexios III Angelos and Isaac II Angelos were her grandsons, thereby making her an ancestor of the Angelos dynasty.

== Family ==
Theodora was born in Constantinople 15 January 1096, the fourth of the five daughters, and seventh child overall, of Emperor Alexios I Komnenos (r. 1081–1118) and Irene Doukaina. In c. 1111 she married the nobleman Constantine Kourtikes, (Note: The Kourtikios/Kourtikes family was of Armenian origin, having entered Byzantine service in the 870s. The exact relationship of Constantine to other members of the family, such as the Kourtikios who took part in the conspiracy of the Anemas brothers against Alexios I, is unknown.) but her husband died by 1118—Theodora is mentioned as a widow at that time—and the marriage remained childless. In c. 1122, certainly after the death of Alexios I, she married a second time, to Constantine Angelos, a minor noble from Philadelphia. He was exceedingly beautiful, but Empress Irene apparently disapproved of it, and it seems to have soured her relations with Theodora, who is listed last and with the least favourable provisions in the typikon that Irene granted to the Kecharitomene Monastery. Theodora herself is mentioned for the last time in October 1136, and it is unknown when she died. Her husband went on to hold a series of not very successful military commands under Manuel I Komnenos (r. 1143–1180). He is last attested in 1166.

== Children ==
From her second marriage to Constantine Angelos, Theodora had seven children. Through her sons, Theodora was the progenitor of the Angelos dynasty, which produced three Byzantine emperors, as well as the Komnenodoukas family, which founded the state of Epirus–Thessalonica.

- John Doukas (c. 1125/27 – c. 1200), had several children by one or two marriages, and a bastard son. The latter, Michael I Komnenos Doukas, would go on to found the Despotate of Epirus, and was succeeded by his half-brothers.
- Maria Angelina (born c. 1128/30), married Constantine Kamytzes, by whom she had a number of children, including Manuel Kamytzes.
- Alexios Komnenos Angelos (born c. 1131/32), married and fathered one son.
- Andronikos Angelos Doukas (c. 1133 – before September 1185), married Euphrosyne Kastamonitissa, by whom he had nine children including emperors Alexios III Angelos and Isaac II Angelos.
- Eudokia Angelina (born c. 1134), married Basil Tzykandeles Goudeles. The couple had no children.
- Zoe Angelina (born c. 1135), married Andronikos Synadenos. The couple had several children, whose names are unknown.
- Isaac Angelos Doukas (born c. 1137), married and had at least four children.

== Sources ==
- Kazhdan, Alexander, ed. (1991). The Oxford Dictionary of Byzantium. Oxford and New York: Oxford University Press. ISBN 0-19-504652-8.
- Varzos, Konstantinos (1984). Η Γενεαλογία των Κομνηνών [The Genealogy of the Komnenoi] (PDF) (in Greek). Vol. A1. Thessaloniki: Centre for Byzantine Studies, University of Thessaloniki.
