= Angelos =

Byzantine Greek noble family

Angelos Ἄγγελος Angelid dynasty
- Imperial dynasty
- Country: Byzantine Empire; Despotate of Epirus; Empire of Thessalonica
- Founded: 11th century 1185; 841 years ago(as imperial dynasty)
- Founder: Constantine Angelos; Isaac Angelos (first emperor)
- Final ruler: Alexios V Doukas (Byzantine Empire); Thomas I Komnenos Doukas (Despotate of Epirus); John II Angelos Doukas (Thessaly)
- Titles: Byzantine Emperor; Despot of Epirus; Ruler of Thessaly
- Deposition: 1204; 822 years ago (Byzantine Empire); 1318; 708 years ago (Despotate of Epirus)

The House of Angelos (Note: Female version Angelina, Ἀγγελίνα; Latinised as Angelus) (/ˈændʒəloʊs, ˈæŋɡəloʊs/; pl. Angeloi; Greek: Ἄγγελος, pl. Ἄγγελοι) was a Byzantine Greek noble family that produced several emperors and other prominent nobles during the middle and late Byzantine Empire. The family rose to prominence through the marriage of its founder, Constantine Angelos, with Theodora Komnene, the youngest daughter of Emperor Alexios I Komnenos. As imperial relatives, the Angeloi held various high titles and military commands under Emperor Manuel I Komnenos. In 1185, following a revolt against Andronikos I Komnenos, Isaac II Angelos rose to the throne. He established the Angeloi as the new imperial family that ruled until 1204. The period was marked by the decline and fragmentation of the Byzantine Empire, culminating in its dissolution by the Fourth Crusade in 1204 under Alexios IV Angelos.

After the Fourth Crusade, another branch of the family managed to establish an independent state in Epirus, which quickly expanded to rule Thessaly and Macedonia. The members of this branch largely eschewed the use of the 'Angelos' surname in favour of the more prestigious 'Doukas' and 'Komnenos', and are collectively known as the Komnenodoukas (Κομνηνοδούκας) dynasty. (Note: Also Komnenos Doukas, pl. Komnenodoukai (Κομνηνοδούκαι)) In c. 1224, Theodore Komnenos Doukas conquered Thessalonica, and founded the Empire of Thessalonica, claiming the Byzantine imperial title in rivalry to the Empire of Nicaea. His empire quickly collapsed after the Battle of Klokotnitsa in 1230. Thessalonica was lost to Nicaea in 1246, and the prospects of recovering Constantinople were dashed at the Battle of Pelagonia in 1259, followed by the re-establishment of the Byzantine Empire under the Palaiologos dynasty in 1261. Often in rivalry to the new Byzantine regime, the Komnenodoukai nevertheless secured recognition and titles from Constantinople, and retained their control over Thessaly (ruled by a cadet line) and Epirus until 1318.

== Early history ==
The Angeloi, unlike some other Byzantine families, were not established among the Byzantine nobility and their lineage was not thought of particularly highly until the first half of the 12th century. Despite the odds, the family's rise occurred rather quickly during the period of the Byzantine aristocratization. The lineage, of Greek origin, was founded by Constantine Angelos, a minor noble from Philadelphia, in the Thracesian Theme (Asia Minor). According to the 12th-century historian John Zonaras, Constantine was brave, skilled and very handsome, but of lowly origin. The family's surname is commonly held to have derived from the Greek word for 'angel' or 'messenger', although such an origin is rarely attested in Byzantine times. Another theory suggests that their name instead derives from A[n]gel, a district near Amida in Upper Mesopotamia. The historian Suzanne Wittek-de Jongh suggested that Constantine was the son of a certain patrikios Manuel Angelos, whose possessions near Serres were confirmed by a chrysobull of Emperor Nikephoros III (r. 1078–1081), but this is considered unlikely by other scholars.

Despite his lowly origin, Constantine managed to win the favors of Theodora Komnene (born 1097), the widow of John Kourtikes and fourth daughter of Emperor Alexios I Komnenos (r. 1081–1118) and Irene Doukaina. Their marriage took place in c. 1122, after the death of Alexios I. As an Imperial in-law, Constantine received the title of sebastohypertatos, even though he was not considered equal to Alexios' other sons-in-law who were of nobler origin and held more titles. Theodora's mother, Empress-dowager Irene, also appears to have disapproved of the match. Constantine and Theodora had seven children, three sons and four daughters. Through his sons, Constantine was the progenitor of the Angelos dynasty, which produced three Byzantine emperors in 1185–1204, as well as the Komnenos Doukas dynasty that ruled over Epirus and Thessalonica in the 13th–14th centuries.

== Imperial Angelos dynasty ==
=== Byzantine Empire ===
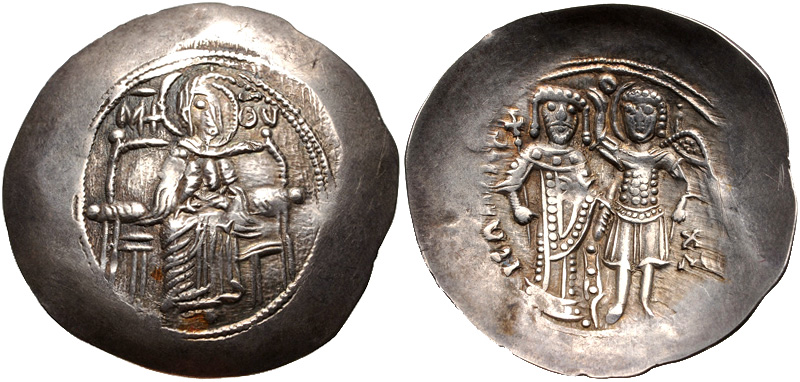
Aspron trachy depicting the Virgin Mary (left) and Isaac II Angelos (right), first ruler of the imperial Angelid dynasty, crowned by saint Michael the Archangel.

Constantine's third son Andronikos Doukas Angelos, was the progenitor of the imperial Angelos dynasty. The Angeloi came into conflict with Emperor Andronikos I Komnenos who had initiated a series of anti-aristocratic policies. In a 1185 coup d'état, Andronikos' son Isaac II Angelos gained popular support and deposed Andronikos I Komnenos proclaiming himself Byzantine emperor. The new emperor did not manage to regulate the weaknesses that he inherited, including the abuses in central and provincial administration. Isaac II failed to crush the revolt of the Bulgarians and Walachians and in 1187 he was forced to recognize the Bulgarian empire. Despite those military defeats, Isaac succeeded in retrieving imperial fortunes in the Balkans, after Branas' victory against the Normans at the Battle of Demetritzes in 1185 and the victory against Stephan Nemanja of Serbia in 1190. During Isaac's reign, attempts to usurp imperial power by Byzantine nobles, previously uncommon in the Byzantine history of the 12th century, became a common occurrence preventing the empire's complete recovery.

In 1195 Isaac II was deposed by his brother Alexios III Angelos, whose coup and misuse of power accelerated the decline of the empire's strength. His reign was marked by abuses in provincial administration and an increasing autonomy of regional magnates who would even defy the emperor's authority. In 1201 Isaac's son, Alexios IV Angelos, made his way to the west, where he succeeded in bringing about the diversion of the Fourth Crusade to Constantinople in order to restore his father, Isaac II, to power. On 1 August 1203, the blinded Isaac II was crowned co-emperor, after eight years of imprisonment, along with his son Alexios IV, who held the true power during their reign. After his deposition by the Fourth Crusade, Alexios III fled Constantinople with the goal of collecting support and restoring his reign, but was eventually captured in Nicaea where he died in a monastery in 1211. Despite their initial synergy, the inability of the Angeloi to deal with the Crusaders' demands caused friction between the Crusaders and the co-emperors, who in January 1204 were deposed by Alexios V Doukas and killed shortly after. With their former supporters now dead, the Crusaders had no support in Constantinople, while the anti-Latin sentiment of the citizens was reinforced. Following the brief reign and failed negotiations by Alexios V, the Crusaders sacked Constantinople and established the Latin Empire officially terminating the Byzantine rule for nearly half a century.

=== Komnenodoukas dynasty ===
Map of the Despotate of Epirus, one the three Byzantine rump states that emerged in 1205 and laid claim to the Byzantine throne, ruled by the Komnenodoukas branch of the Angelos dynasty.

The Angelos line was continued by the descendants of Constantine's eldest son, the sebastokrator John Doukas. Like John, most of his descendants eschewed the surname "Angelos" and used either "Doukas" or "Komnenos Doukas", after which they are known in modern scholarship as the "Komnenodoukai" (Κομνηνοδούκαι).

After the fall of Constantinople and the establishment of the Latin Empire in 1204, John Doukas' illegitimate son, Michael I Komnenos Doukas, founded the Despotate of Epirus in 1205 choosing the city of Arta as its capital. Initially a vassal and an ally of the Latins, Michael I went on to expand his territories in north-eastern Greece until his death in 1215, when he was succeeded by his half-brother Theodore Komnenos Doukas. In 1224, Theodore captured the Kingdom of Thessalonica from the crusaders and proclaimed himself as the legitimate Byzantine emperor (basileus) in his holdings. Epirus appeared as a serious contender for the Byzantine throne, but Theodore was defeated and captured by John II Asen at the Battle of Klokotnitsa in 1230 and his empire quickly declined following the loses in Macedonia and Thrace. During Theodore's captivity, his brother Manuel ruled over Thessalonica, succeeded by Theodore's sons John and Demetrios. In 1242 the Nicaean emperor John III Doukas Vatatzes compelled John to abandon the imperial title (keeping only the title of despotes), and by 1246 Thessalonica was captured by Nicaea, marking the end of the Angelid rule in much of northern Greece.

In 1230, Theodore's nephew Michael II, son of Michael I, established himself as ruler of Epirus and Thessaly and was partially successful in recapturing holdings lost to Nicaea. After the death of Michael II in 1268, Epirus was ruled by his legitimate son Nikephoros I, while Thessaly – now separated from Epirus – was given to his illegitimate son John I Doukas. The Komnenodoukas family lost both Epirus and Thessaly in 1318; Nicholas Orsini, Count of Cephalonia, murdered Nikephoros' son Thomas I, ending the rule of the family in Epirus, while in Thessaly John I Doukas was succeeded by his son Constantine, followed by John II, who ruled from 1302/03 until his death in 1318. In the same year, the south of Thessaly was seized by the Catalan Grand Company and annexed to the Duchy of Athens, while the north passed to a series of autonomous magnates.

== Later family ==
Having re-established Byzantine control over Epirus and Thessaly in 1340, emperor Andronikos III Palaiologos appointed the pinkernes (cup-bearer) John Angelos, a nephew of megas domestikos John Kantakouzenos, to the governorship of Epirus. John extended his rule to Thessaly in 1342, but died from the plague in 1348. Epirus and Thessaly were conquered by the Serbian ruler Stefan Dušan soon afterwards.

Descendants of John Angelos continued to govern Thessaly under Simeon Uroš and John Uroš. John Uroš, the last Nemanjić, abdicated in favour of Alexios Angelos Philanthropenos, the kaisar of Thessaly. Alexios' brother Manuel Angelos Philanthropenos was the last Byzantine Greek ruler of Thessaly.

After the Ottoman conquest of Thessaly in 1394, the Angeloi Philanthropenoi took refuge in Serbia. A grandson of either Alexios or Manuel, Mihailo Anđelović, served as an official at the court of Đurađ and Lazar Branković. Mihailo's brother Mahmud, captured in his infancy by Ottoman soldiers, was brought to Adrianople, where he converted to Islam. He later rose to the highest ranks of the Ottoman Empire, becoming beylerbey of Rumelia in 1451 and Grand Vizier in 1455. Thus, in the negotiations between Serb despot Lazar Branković and Mehmed II in 1457, the two sides were represented by the brothers Mihailo and Mahmud Anđelović.

== Family tree ==
House of Angelos

Irene Doukaina	Alexios I Byzantine emperor (1081–1118); HOUSE OF KOMNENOS
Theodora Komnene	Constantine; HOUSE OF ANGELOS
John sebastokrator BRANCH OF EPIRUS (KOMNENOS DOUKAS)	Zoe Doukaina	Andronikos general	Isaacios; Angelos Doukas
(illeg.) Michael I ruler of Epirus	(2)Constantine; Despot of Acarnania & Aetolia	(2) Theodore ruler of Epirus ruler of Thessalonica; BRANCH OF THESSALONICA	(2) Manuel Doukas ruler of Thessaly	Constantine sebastokrator	Alexios III; Byzantine emperor (1195–1203)	Isaakios II; Byzantine emperor (1185–1195, 1203–1204)	Constantine usurper
(illeg.) Michael II despot of Epirus	John ruler of Thessalonica	Demetrios ruler of Thessalonica	Anna ∞ Theodore I Laskaris; Emperor of Nicaea (1205–1222); HOUSE OF LASKARIS	Eudokia ∞ Alexios V Doukas; Byzantine emperor (1204)	Alexios IV; Byzantine emperor (1203–1204)	John duke of Syrmia
Nikephoros I despot of Epirus	John general	Demetrios (Michael) "Koutroules" general	(illeg.) John I sebastokrator, ruler of Thessaly (1268–1289); BRANCH OF THESSALY
Thomas I despot of Epirus	Andronikos protosebastos	Constantine ruler of Thessaly (1289–1303)	Theodore co-ruler of Thessaly (1289-1299)
Anna ∞ John II Orsini count palatine of Cephalonia & Zakynthos despot of Epirus (1323–1335)	John II ruler of Thessaly (1303-1318)

== See also ==
- History of the Byzantine Empire
