= Eudokia Komnene (daughter of Alexios I) =

- Born: 14 January 1094
- Died: c. 1129
- Spouse: Michael Iasites
- Issue: At least 2
- House: Komnenos
- Father: Alexios I Komnenos
- Mother: Irene Doukaina

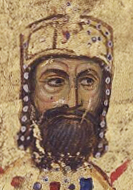
Portrait of the Byzantine Emperor Alexios I Komnenos (r. 1081-1118)

Eudokia Komnene (Greek: Εὐδοκία Κομνηνή; 14 January 1094 – c. 1129) was the third daughter of the Byzantine emperor Alexios I Komnenos (r. 1081–1118). Her brother was John II Komnenos.

== Life ==
Eudokia Komnene was born on 14 January 1094, as the third daughter and sixth child of the Byzantine emperor Alexios I Komnenos and empress Irene Doukaina. As her parents were ruling since 1081, she was attributed the title of a porphyrogennete princess.

In 1109 or shortly after she married the son of the kouropalates Constantine Iasites, who may have been named Michael. The marriage was dissolved soon after, however, by Empress Irene, as Iasites did not respect his wife nor the Empress herself, and behaved towards them in a manner inappropriate to their birth and station. As a result, according to Zonaras, when Eudokia fell ill, her mother had her confined to a convent, and expelled Iasites from the palace. From her marriage, she had at least two children, whose names are unknown.

This happened before 1116, when Empress Irene dedicated the first part of the typikon of the Kecharitomene Monastery, and confided it and the monastery to Eudokia's stewardship. Eudokia assisted her father at his deathbed in August 1118. She herself died sometime before 1130/31, according to the historian Konstantinos Varzos probably around 1129.

== Sources ==
- Skoulatos, Basile (1980). Les personnages byzantins de l'Alexiade: Analyse prosopographique et synthèse [The Byzantine Personalities of the Alexiad: Prosopographical Analysis and Synthesis] (in French). Louvain-la-Neuve and Louvain: Bureau du Recueil Collège Érasme and Éditions Nauwelaerts.
- Varzos, Konstantinos (1984). Η Γενεαλογία των Κομνηνών [The Genealogy of the Komnenoi] (PDF) (in Greek). Vol. A1. Thessaloniki: Centre for Byzantine Studies, University of Thessaloniki.

[dead link]
