= Angelus Family =

Angelus Family may refer to:

- Isaac II Angelos (1156–1204)
- Alexios III Angelos (c. 1153–1211)
- Alexios IV Angelos (c. 1182–1204)
