= Eudokia Komnene =

Eudokia Komnene or Eudocia Comnena (Greek: Εὐδοκία Κομνηνή) can refer to:

- Eudokia Komnene (daughter of Alexios I) (1094 – c. 1129), sixth child of Alexios I Komnenos
- Eudokia Komnene (daughter of Isaac Komnenos) (c. 1096 – after 1150), eighth child of Isaac Komnenos
- Eudokia Komnene (daughter of John II) (c. 1116 – before 1150), seventh child of John II Komnenos, wife of Theodore Vatatzes
- Eudokia Komnene, Lady of Montpellier (c. 1160/64 – c. 1203), first wife of William VIII of Montpellier
