= Andronikos Angelos Doukas =

Byzantine general, father of Alexios III and Isaac II

- Born: c. 1133; Constantinople (modern-day Istanbul, Turkey)
- Died: 1183/85; Acre
- Spouse: Euphrosyne Kastamonitissa
- Relatives: Constantine Angelos (father); Theodora Komnene (mother) John Doukas, Isaac Doukas (brothers) Constantine, Alexios III, Michael, Theodore, Isaac II, Irene, Theodora (children)
- Military career
- Allegiance: Byzantine Empire
- Service years: c. 1176–1182
- Wars: Byzantine–Seljuk wars; Byzantine–Seljuk war (1175–1179); Battle of Myriokephalon; Revolt of Andronikos I Komnenos

Andronikos Angelos Doukas (Greek: Ἀνδρόνικος Ἄγγελος Δούκας; c. 1133 – before 1185) was a Byzantine aristocrat related to the ruling Komnenos dynasty. During the reign of his cousin, Manuel I Komnenos, he served without success as a military commander against the Seljuk Turks, and as envoy to the Kingdom of Jerusalem. Following Manuel's death, in 1182, he was sent to stop the rebellion of Andronikos I Komnenos but was defeated and eventually defected to him. Shortly after, he led a failed conspiracy of leading aristocrats against Andronikos I. When it was discovered, Andronikos and his sons fled the Empire, ending up in Acre, where he died. He was the father of emperors Isaac II Angelos and Alexios III Angelos.

== Life ==
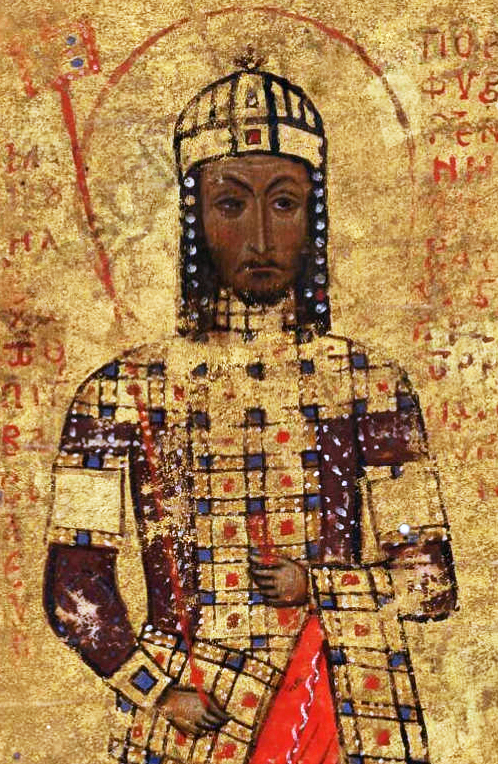
Manuscript miniature of Manuel I, Vatican Library, Rome

Andronikos was born around 1133, the third son of Constantine Angelos and Theodora Komnene, the youngest daughter of Emperor Alexios I Komnenos (r. 1081–1118) and Irene Doukaina. Some time before 1155, probably around 1150, he married Euphrosyne Kastamonitissa, sister of Theodore Kastamonites, who became an all-powerful minister during the reign of Andronikos' son Isaac II. Andronikos is first recorded in historical sources during a synod in March 1166 that was convened over the interpretation of Christ's statement "My Father is greater than I". He participated in it along with his brothers and other senior members of the court and ecclesiastical hierarchy.

In 1176, Andronikos, and his older brother John, commanded units in the imperial army's vanguard in the campaign against the Seljuk Sultanate of Iconium. The campaign culminated in the Byzantine defeat at the Battle of Myriokephalon. In the following year, Andronikos led an embassy, which included the megas hetaireiarches John Doukas, Alexander, Count of Gravina, and George Sinaites, to the Kingdom of Jerusalem to renew the alliance between his first cousin, Emperor Manuel I Komnenos (r. 1143–1180), and King Baldwin IV.

In 1179, Emperor Manuel entrusted Andronikos with leading a campaign against the Turks in the area of Charax in Phrygia. However, during the night, some Turks managed to move to the rear of the imperial army and raised loud voices. Fearing that he was encircled, Andronikos mounted his horse and fled headlong towards Chonae. Upon seeing the flight of its commander, the Byzantine army panicked and began to flee in the same direction; the rout was only stopped when another imperial relative, Manuel Kantakouzenos, confronted the fleeing soldiers with a sword in his hand and pointed out that no enemy was attacking them. According to the account of the contemporary historian Niketas Choniates, Emperor Manuel was so incensed at the disgraceful actions of Andronikos that he threatened to have him publicly paraded through the streets of Constantinople dressed as a woman; in the end, however, he relented and did not carry out his threat. Shortly after, Andronikos tried to divorce his wife, Euphrosyne Kastamonitissa, and marry his mistress, but the Emperor and the synod forbade him to do so.

In spring 1182, Empress-regent Maria of Antioch and her chief minister, Alexios Komnenos, sent Andronikos to confront another cousin, Andronikos Komnenos, who had rebelled and was marching on Constantinople. Andronikos Komnenos had reached the vicinity of Nicomedia, where many local people joined him. In a battle near Charax, Andronikos Angelos Doukas was defeated by a hastily assembled rebel army consisting, according to Choniates, of "farmers unfit for warfare and a contingent of Paphlagonian soldiers", led not even by an experienced commander but by "a certain eunuch". On his return to Constantinople, Andronikos was faced with accusations that he had misappropriated money meant for the army's salary. Fearing accusations of pro-rebel sentiments, at the advice of his sons he barricaded himself and his family in their walled palace at Exokionion, before fleeing the city altogether and joining Andronikos Komnenos in Bithynia. Emboldened by this defection, Andronikos Komnenos moved to Chalcedon, across the Bosporus from Constantinople. Following the defection of the megas doux Andronikos Kontostephanos with the navy to the rebel, a revolt broke out in the city and the gates were opened to Andronikos Komnenos, who now ascended the throne as emperor.

Soon, however, the very same nobles who had aided Andronikos Komnenos in becoming emperor conspired against him, once it became clear that he did not intend to restore them to the privileged positions they had held under Emperor Manuel. Andronikos Angelos and Andronikos Kontostephanos, along with their numerous sons, and the logothetes tou dromou Basil Doukas Kamateros, were the leaders of the plot, which was quickly discovered by the Emperor's agents. Kamateros, Kontostephanos and four of his sons, as well as many other members of the conspiracy, were seized and blinded, but Andronikos and his sons escaped. According to Choniates, while fleeing from the pursuing imperial soldiers, Andronikos and his sons found a boat laden with empty amphorae; throwing the cargo overboard, they boarded it and sailed to safety. Andronikos left Byzantine territory and went to Damascus and Baghdad, where he met and received aid from Saladin before settling at Acre. He probably died there, some time before the rise of his son Isaac to the throne in September 1185.

== Family ==
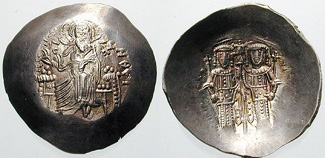
Silver aspron trachy of Alexios III Angelos

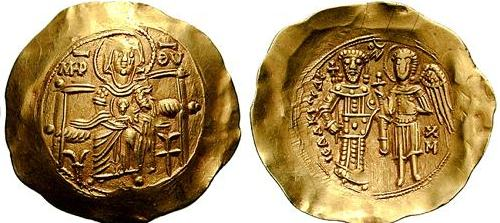
Gold hyperpyron of Isaac II Angelos

Andronikos and Euphrosyne Kastamonitissa had eight children, six sons and two daughters. Only Constantine, Alexios, and Isaac are securely attested as Andronikos' sons. The names of the other three sons are unknown and disputed among scholars.

- Constantine Komnenos Angelos (c. 1151 – after 1199), military commander, blinded by Andronikos Komnenos, and raised to sebastokrator by his brother Isaac. Married and had issue, the names of both his wife and offspring are unknown.
- John Angelos (c. 1152 – possibly after 1222), blinded by Andronikos Komnenos, and likely raised to Caesar and then sebastokrator by his brother Isaac. Married, possibly to Irene Komnene, and had one son, Andronikos.
- Alexios III Angelos (c. 1153 – 1211), raised to sebastokrator by his brother Isaac, usurped the throne from him in 1195. Generally an inept and pleasure-loving ruler, he reigned until he fled before the attacks of the Fourth Crusade in 1203. He tried to capture the Empire of Nicaea in 1211 but was defeated by Theodore I Laskaris and died soon after. Married Euphrosyne Doukaina Kamatera and had three daughters, Irene, Anna, and Eudokia.
- Michael Angelos (c. 1154 – unknown), unnamed in the sources, he has been tentatively identified with a Caesar of this name, known only from a single seal. Like all his brothers except for Isaac and Alexios, he, too, was blinded by Andronikos I.
- Theodore Angelos (c. 1155 – after 1199), in 1183, he led a rebellion against Andronikos I at Prussa, and was defeated, blinded, and exiled to the Seljuks. When Isaac became emperor, he may have been raised to Caesar. Married and had issue, the names of both his wife and offspring are unknown.
- Isaac II Angelos (1156–1204), in 1183, he led a rebellion along with Theodore Kantakouzenos against Andronikos I at Nicaea, but after Kantakouzenos' death submitted to the Emperor. Isaac's killing of the hated chief minister, Stephen Hagiochristophorites, in 1185 inspired a popular revolt that deposed Andronikos and brought Isaac to the throne. He ruled until deposed by his brother Alexios in 1195, but was restored by the Crusaders in 1203, remaining on the throne along with his son Alexios IV until his death, shortly before the final Sack of Constantinople by the Crusaders. He married first an unknown lady and had three children, Anna-Euphrosyne, Irene, and Alexios IV; with his second wife, Margaret of Hungary, he had had two sons, Manuel and John.
- Irene Angelina (c. 1154 – unknown), married John Kantakouzenos, who on the occasion was named Caesar. The couple had at least one son, whose name is unknown.
- Theodora Angelina (c. 1160 – unknown), married marquess Conrad of Montferrat, who on the occasion was named Caesar. After Conrad abandoned her in 1187 to go to Jerusalem, she retired to the Dalmatou Monastery, which was converted into a female convent for her.

== Sources ==
- Angelov, Dimiter (2019). The Byzantine Hellene: The Life of Emperor Theodore Laskaris and Byzantium in the Thirteenth Century. Cambridge: Cambridge University Press. ISBN 978-1-108-48071-0.
- Brand, Charles M. (1968). Byzantium Confronts the West, 1180–1204. Cambridge, Massachusetts: Harvard University Press. LCCN 67-20872.
- Choniates, Nicetas (1984). O City of Byzantium, Annals of Niketas Choniatēs. Translated by Harry J. Magoulias. Detroit: Wayne State University Press. ISBN 0-8143-1764-2.
- Polemis, Demetrios I. (1968). The Doukai: A Contribution to Byzantine Prosopography. London: The Athlone Press.
- Varzos, Konstantinos (1984). Η Γενεαλογία των Κομνηνών [The Genealogy of the Komnenoi] (PDF) (in Greek). Vol. A2. Thessaloniki: Centre for Byzantine Studies, University of Thessaloniki.
- Varzos, Konstantinos (1984). Η Γενεαλογία των Κομνηνών [The Genealogy of the Komnenoi] (PDF) (in Greek). Vol. B. Thessaloniki: Centre for Byzantine Studies, University of Thessaloniki.
