= Isaac II Angelos =

Byzantine emperor (1185–1195; 1203–1204)

- Emperor and Autocrat of the Romans
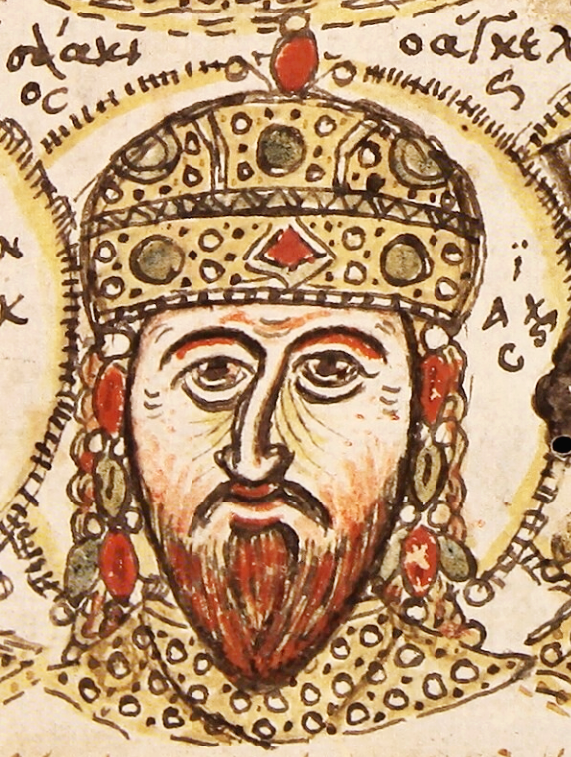
- Portrait of Isaac II (from a 15th-century codex containing a copy of the Extracts of History by Joannes Zonaras)

Byzantine emperor
- Reign: 12 September 1185 – 8 April 1195
- Predecessor: Andronikos I Komnenos
- Successor: Alexios III Angelos
- Reign: 19 July 1203 – 27 January 1204
- Coronation: 1 August 1203
- Successor: Alexios V Doukas
- Co-Emperor: Alexios IV Angelos
- Born: Isaac Angelos; Ἰσαάκιος Ἄγγελος; September 1156
- Died: 28 January 1204 (aged 47); Constantinople (now Istanbul, Turkey)
- Spouse: Irene Tornikina (ended 1185) Margaret of Hungary (m. 1186–1204)
- Issue: Anna-Euphrosyne; Irene Angelina; Alexios IV Angelos; John Angelos
Names
- Isaac Komnenos Angelos; Ἰσαάκιος Κομνηνός Ἄγγελος
- Dynasty: Angelos
- Father: Andronikos Angelos Doukas
- Mother: Euphrosyne Kastamonitissa
- Religion: Greek Orthodox

Isaac II Komnenos Angelos or Angelus (Greek: Ἰσαάκιος Κομνηνός Ἄγγελος, romanized: Isaákios Komnēnós Ángelos; September 1156 – 28 January 1204) was Byzantine Emperor from 1185 to 1195, and co-Emperor with his son Alexios IV Angelos from 1203 to 1204. In an 1185 revolt against the Emperor Andronikos Komnenos, Isaac seized power and rose to the Byzantine throne, establishing the Angelos family as the new imperial dynasty.

Born into a powerful family related to the Comneni , he possessed a certain legitimacy to hold imperial power and relied on various groups within the Byzantine aristocracy to consolidate his authority. Nevertheless, he was immediately confronted with the significant challenges facing the Byzantine Empire at the time. Indeed, revolts and secessions multiplied on several fronts, in addition to external threats such as the Normans , whom he struggled to repel upon his accession to the throne. Forced to replenish the Empire's coffers, he increased taxes and provoked a serious rebellion by the Bulgarians and Wallachians , which led to the creation of the Second Bulgarian Empire , while he was unable to bring Cyprus back under imperial control.

Often held responsible for the serious troubles that the Empire experienced at the end of the 12th century, he enjoys a poor reputation among the chroniclers of the time as well as modern historians, with a degree of severity varying according to the authors, who sometimes emphasize his voluntarism and the magnitude of challenges that exceeded his sole reign.

== Early life ==
=== Early accounts and rise to power ===
Isaac Angelos was possibly born in September 1156. He was the son of Andronikos Angelos Doukas (c. 1122 – aft. 1185), a member of the Angelos family and a military general and leader in Asia Minor who served under Manuel I Komnenos and married Euphrosyne Kastamonitissa (c. 1125 – aft. 1195). Andronikos Angelos Doukas was the son of Constantine Angelos and Theodora Komnene (b. 15 January 1096/7), the youngest daughter of Emperor Alexios I Komnenos and Irene Doukaina. Thus Isaac was a member of the extended imperial clan of the Komnenoi. Niketas Choniates described Isaac's physical appearance: "He had a ruddy complexion and red hair, was of average height and robust in body".

During the reign of the Andronikos I-led regency council for Alexios II, Isaac along with his family and other nobles including Basil Doukas Kamateros attempted to plot against Andronikos. According to Choniates, the plot was discovered by the emperor's agents, and many nobles were captured and blinded. While fleeing from the pursuing imperial soldiers, Isaac and his family found a boat laden with empty amphorae. Throwing the cargo overboard, they boarded it and sailed to safety. They first went Damascus then to Baghdad, where he met and received aid from Saladin before settling at Acre in the Kingdom of Jerusalem.

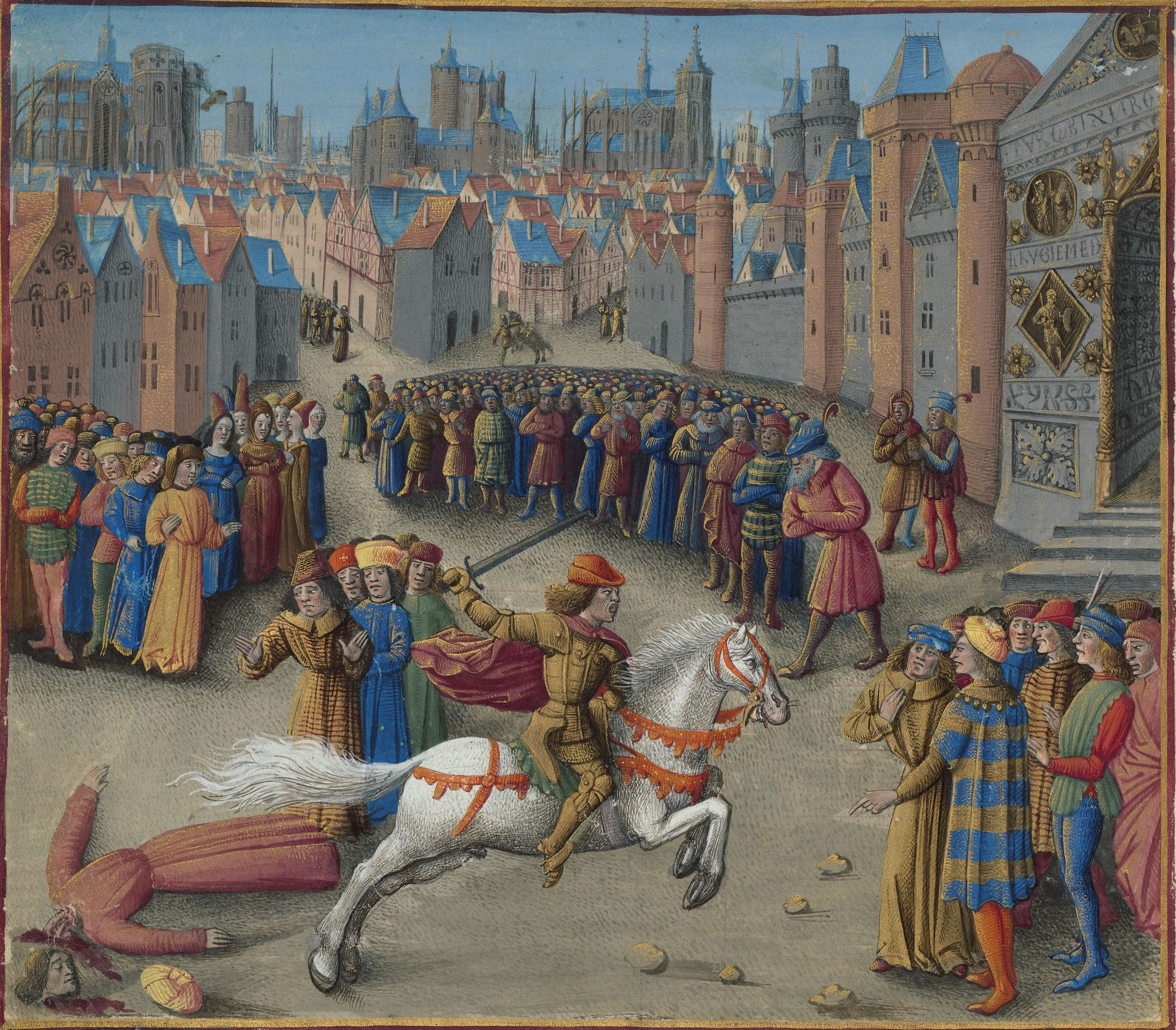
Killing of Stephen Hagiochristophorites, c. 1473, miniature by Jean Colombe in Les Passages d'outremer, BNF.

Isaac along with his brothers returned to Byzantium to challenge Andronikos, who had since been crowned emperor. Alongside his father and brothers, Isaac participated in the revolt of Nicaea and Prousa. Atypically, the Emperor did not punish him for this disloyalty, and Isaac remained at Constantinople.

On 11 September 1185, while Andronikos was absent from the capital, his lieutenant Stephen Hagiochristophorites attempted to arrest Isaac. Isaac killed Hagiochristophorites and took refuge in the Hagia Sophia. Although Andronikos was a capable ruler, he was widely despised for his cruelty. Isaac appealed to the populace, and a tumult arose that spread rapidly over the whole city. When Andronikos returned he found that he had lost popular support, and that Isaac had been proclaimed emperor. Andronikos attempted to flee by boat but was apprehended. Isaac handed him over to the people of the city, and he was killed on 12 September 1185.

== First reign ==
Isaac II Angelos strengthened his position as emperor with dynastic marriages in 1185 and 1186. Isaac's sister Theodora was married to the Italian marquis Conrad of Montferrat. In January 1186, Isaac himself married Margaret of Hungary (renamed Maria), daughter of King Béla III. Hungary was one of the Empire's largest and most powerful neighbours, and Margaret also had the benefit of high aristocratic descent, being related to the royal families of Kiev, the Holy Roman Empire, Italy, Provence, and earlier Byzantine dynasties. Sometime after 1191, his niece Eudokia Angelina was married to Stefan, son of Grand Prince Stefan Nemanja of Serbia.

Isaac inaugurated his reign with a decisive victory over the Norman King of Sicily, William II, at the Battle of Demetritzes on 7 November 1185. William had invaded the Balkans with 80,000 men and 200 ships towards the end of Andronikos I's reign. Elsewhere Isaac's policy was less successful. In late 1185, he sent a fleet of 80 galleys to liberate his brother Alexius III from Acre, but the fleet was destroyed by the Normans of Sicily. He then sent a fleet of 70 ships, but it failed to recover Cyprus from the rebellious noble Isaac Komnenos, thanks to Norman interference. This fleet was misinterpreted by many in the Holy Land as naval support for the Muslim offensive in accordance with Isaac's alliance with Saladin. However the theory of a supposed alliance between Isaac and Saladin against the Third Crusade has been discredited by modern research.

Isaac's administration was dominated by two figures: his maternal uncle Theodore Kastamonites, who became virtually a co-emperor and handled all civil government until his death in 1193; and his replacement, Constantine Mesopotamites, who acquired even more influence over the emperor.

The oppressiveness of his taxes, increased to pay his armies and finance his marriage, resulted in a Vlach-Bulgarian uprising late in 1185. The rebellion led to the establishment of the Vlach-Bulgarian Empire under the Asen dynasty. In 1187 Alexios Branas, the victor over the Normans, was sent against the Bulgarians but turned his arms against his master and attempted to seize Constantinople, only to be defeated and slain by Isaac's brother-in-law Conrad of Montferrat. Also in 1187 an agreement was made with Venice, in which the Venetian Republic would provide between 40 and 100 galleys at six months' notice in exchange for favorable trading concessions. Because each Venetian galley was manned by 140 oarsmen, there were about 18,000 Venetians still in the Empire even after Manuel I's arrests.

The Emperor's attention was next demanded in the east, where several claimants to the throne successively rose and fell. In 1189 the Holy Roman Emperor Frederick I Barbarossa sought and obtained permission to lead his troops on the Third Crusade through the Byzantine Empire. But Isaac was suspicious that Barbarossa wished to conquer Byzantium: the reasons for this suspicious attitude were the diplomatic contact of Frederick with the Bulgarians and the Serbians, foes of the Byzantine Empire during this period, and also Barbarossa's previous feud with Manuel. The rumors of 1160s about a German invasion in the Byzantine Empire were still remembered in the Byzantine court during Isaac's reign. In retaliation Barbarossa's army occupied the city of Philippopolis and defeated a Byzantine army of 3,000 men that attempted to recapture the city. The Byzantine troops managed to constantly and successfully harass the Crusaders but a group of Armenians revealed to the Germans the strategic plan of the Byzantines. The Crusaders, who outnumbered the Byzantines, caught them unprepared and defeated them. Thus compelled by force of arms, Isaac II was forced to fulfill his engagements in 1190, when he released imprisoned German emissaries who were held in Constantinople, and exchanged hostages with Barbarossa, as a guarantee that the crusaders would not sack local settlements until they departed the Byzantine territory. In March 1190, Barbarossa left Adrianople to Gallipoli at the Hellespont to embark to Asia Minor.

In 1191, Isaac II launched a military expedition against Serbia. The Byzantine army was victorious in the battle at South Morava (autumn 1191), that led to the recovery of Niš and the consequent peace treaty.

== Fall and second reign ==
By 1196, Isaac II had allowed the once powerful Byzantine navy to decline to only 30 galleys.

Isaac's reign was disturbed by continued warfare with Bulgaria, against which he led several expeditions in person. In spite of their promising start these ventures had little effect. The Byzantines suffered major defeats at the 1190 Battle of Tryavna, from which Isaac barely escaped with his life, and at the Battle of Arcadiopolis in 1194. Isaac and the Kingdom of Hungary cooperated in a new offensive against Bulgaria in 1195; on 8 (or 9) April, while Isaac was away from camp on a hunting expedition, his older brother Alexios Angelos proclaimed himself emperor and was readily recognised by the soldiers as Emperor Alexios III. Alexios then canceled the expedition and ordered Isaac to be blinded and imprisoned in Constantinople.

During his imprisonment, first in the Great Palace and then in an apparently comfortable location on the Golden Horn at Diplokionion. he maintained some contact with his family, notably with his daughter, Irene, who was married to Philip of Swabia, King of Germany . He is said to have asked her to use her influence in his favor.

By 1201, Isaac's son, Alexis, had sought refuge in Venice and appealed to the republic for help in reclaiming the throne. Taking advantage of the situation, Doge Enrico Dandolo diverted the Fourth Crusade to Constantinople. With the Crusaders' support, Alexis IV captured Constantinople in July 1203 forcing Alexis III to flee. Isaac II was freed after eight years of captivity. The Crusaders demanded that Isaac II recognize the Pact of Zara before allowing Alexis IV to return to the capital. Isaac complied and confirmed this pact with a chrysobull , before having his son crowned as co-emperor with the approval of the Crusaders. Both his mind and body had been enfeebled by his blindness and confinement, and his son Alexios IV Angelos was associated on the throne as the effective monarch..

Heavily beholden to the crusaders, Alexios IV was unable to meet his obligations and his vacillation caused him to lose the support of both his crusader allies and his subjects. At the end of January 1204, the influential court official Alexios Doukas took advantage of riots in the capital to imprison Alexios IV and seize the throne as Alexios V. At this point Isaac II died, allegedly of shock, while Alexios IV was strangled.

== Usurpers ==
Isaac reign was also marked by constant plots and usurpations by various usurpers and plotters which further weakened the empire. Several pretenders rose up and attempted to wrest the throne from Isaac during his reign. These included:

- Alexios Branas - A staunch Komnenos supporter and opponent of the newly crowned Isaac II, he was sent to suppress uprising of Asen and Peter, but was instead proclaimed emperor by his army in Adrianople. He then set out to take Constantinople, later being killed in action while fighting outside the city's walls.
- Theodore Mangaphas - A local ruler of Philadelphia (today Alaşehir), in c.1188 Theodore secured the allegiance of the city's inhabitants and surrounding regions, proclaimed himself emperor and minted his own silver coinage. After being besieged in his home city, he surrendered and retained control of Philadelphia as its governor.
- Pseudo-Alexios II = A man from Constantinople who strongly resembled the previous emperor Manuel I Komnenos, and claimed to be his deceased son, Alexios II Komnenos. Convincing many with his appearance, he assembled an army of 8,000 men and ravaged the valley of the Maeander River, storming several cities, with the rebellion ending after his assassination by a priest.
- Basil Chotzas – initiated a rebellion at Tarsia, near Nicomedia. Initially, he had some success, but before long, he was seized, blinded, and cast into prison.
- Isaac Comnenus (nephew of Andronicus I Comnenus) – escaped from prison and fled to Hagia Sophia, where he proceeded to incite a mob. Eventually captured, he was suspended in the air and tortured in order to obtain the names of his accomplices. His internal organs suffered severe damage, and he died the next day.
- Constantine Tatikios – secretly established a group of 500 individuals who hid in Constantinople. Though they managed to escape detection for some considerable time, he was informed against, captured, and blinded.

== Historical reputation ==
Isaac has the reputation as one of the most unsuccessful rulers to occupy the Byzantine throne. Surrounded by a crowd of slaves, mistresses, and flatterers, he permitted his empire to be administered by unworthy favourites, while he squandered the money wrung from his provinces on costly buildings and expensive gifts to the churches of his metropolis. In 1185, the Empire lost Lefkada, Kefallonia, and Zakynthos to the Normans. In the same year, the Bulgarian Empire was restored after the rebellion of the brothers Asen and Peter, thus losing Moesia and parts of Thrace and Macedonia. After that, Cilicia was retaken by the Armenians, and Cyprus was wrested from the empire by the Crusaders.

== Family ==
=== First marriage ===
Isaac II's first wife's name, Herina (i.e., Eirene/Irene), is found on the necrology of Speyer Cathedral, where their daughter Irene is interred. The first wife of Isaac II is usually considered to be a Byzantine noblewoman of unknown name. In an Italian edition of the chronicle of Nicetas Choniates "Greatness and catastrophe of Byzantium" can be found an interesting note to the XIV Book. The names of Isaac II's first wife and eldest daughter, unknown from Byzantine sources, are found in an obituary in the Cathedral of Speyer, the pantheon of German kings. Here, the wife of Philip of Swabia is said to be the daughter of Isaac and Irene (there is reference to the following article: R. Hiestand, Die erste Ehe Isaaks II. Angelos und seine Kinder, in Jahrbuch der Osterreichischen Byzantinisk, XLVII 1997 pp. 199–208). This Irene could be identified with the daughter of George Palaiologos Doukas Komnenos and wife Aspae, Bagratid Princess of Ossetia, according to Leontii Voitovych and Aleksandr Mayorov; the son of this ones, Andronikos Palaiologos Komnenodoukas, is known as gambrox (γαμβρός) of Isaac II. In alternative, Isaac's wife was possibly daughter of Andronikos I Komnenos, Byzantine Emperor (died 1185). A potential foreign origin is also given to her due to having the same name as her daughter, contrary to long-standing Greek custom. A more recent examination (2011) of the extant documentation presents the case that Irene was very likely a Tornikina and daughter of Demetrios Tornikios, logothetes tou dromou and sebastos of Isaac II and maternal nephew of Theophylact of Ohrid, and an unknown Malakissa, sister of Euthymios Malakes. Their third child was born c. 1182 and she was dead or divorced by 1185, when Isaac remarried.

Their children were:

- Anna-Euphrosyne Angelina (?–1253), married to Roman the Great.
- Irene Angelina (c. 1181–1208), married first to Roger III of Sicily and secondly to Philip of Swabia. Isaac is the ancestor of all European monarchs now reigning through Irene's children by Philip.
- Alexios IV Angelos (c. 1182–1204).

=== Second marriage ===
By his second wife, Margaret of Hungary (who took the baptismal name "Maria"), Isaac II had two sons:

- Manuel Angelos (b. after 1195 – d. 1212), he was evidently the elder son, being contemplated in 1205 to ascend the Byzantine throne
- John Angelos (b. ca. 1193 – d. 1259). He migrated to Hungary and ruled over Syrmia and Bacs (1227–42) as a vassal of king Béla IV of Hungary.

== See also ==
- List of Roman emperors

== Sources ==
- Angold, Michael, The Byzantine Empire: A Political History, 1025–1204, 2nd ed. (London and New York, 1997). ISBN 978-0582294684
- Brand, Charles M. (1968). Byzantium Confronts the West, 1180–1204. Cambridge, Massachusetts: Harvard University Press. LCCN 67-20872.
- Burkhardt, Stefan (2016). "Between empires: South-eastern Europe and the two Roman Empires in the Middle Ages". In Jaritz, Gerhard; Szende, Katalin (eds.). Medieval East Central Europe in a Comparative Perspective: From Frontier to Lands in Focus. Routledge.
- Choniates, Niketas (1984) [1207]. O city of Byzantium: Annals of Niketas Choniatēs. Translated by Magoulias, Harry J. Wayne State University Press. ISBN 0814317642. OCLC 10605650.
- Freed, John (2016). Frederick Barbarossa: The Prince and the Myth. New Haven, CT: Yale University Press. ISBN 978-0-300-122763.
- Harris, Jonathan (2007). Constantinople: Capital of Byzantium. Hambledon Continuum.
- Harris, Jonathan, Byzantium and the Crusades (London: Bloomsbury, 2nd ed., 2014). ISBN 978-1-78093-767-0
- Harris, Jonathan, 'Collusion with the infidel as a pretext for military action against Byzantium', in Clash of Cultures: the Languages of Love and Hate, ed. Sarah Lambert and Helen Nicholson (Turnhout, 2012), pp. 99–117
- Head, C. (1980) Physical Descriptions of the Emperors in Byzantine Historical Writing, Byzantion, Vol. 50, No. 1 (1980), Peeters Publishers, pp. 226–240
- Hiestand, Rudolf, 'Die Erste Ehe Isaaks II Angelus und Seine Kinder', Jahrbuch der Osterreichischen Byzantinistik, 47 (1997).
- Kazhdan, Alexander, ed. (1991). The Oxford Dictionary of Byzantium. Oxford and New York: Oxford University Press. ISBN 0-19-504652-8.
- Komatina, Ivana (2018). "On the attack of the Hungarian king Bela III on Serbia in light of the letter of emperor Isaac II to pope Celestine III". Facta Universitatis: Philosophy, Sociology, Psychology and History. 17 (2): 105–110. Archived from the original on 1 September 2020.
- McDaniel, Gordon L. (1984). "On Hungarian-Serbian Relations in the Thirteenth Century: John Angelos and Queen Jelena" (PDF). Ungarn-Jahrbuch. 12 (1982–1983): München, 1984: 43–50.
- Moravcsik, Gyula (1970). Byzantium and the Magyars. Budapest: Akadémiai Kiadó.
- Ostrogorsky, George (1956). History of the Byzantine State. Oxford: Basil Blackwell.
- Savignac, David. "The Medieval Russian Account of the Fourth Crusade – A New Annotated Translation".
- Treadgold, Warren (1997). A History of the Byzantine State and Society. Stanford, California: Stanford University Press. ISBN 0-8047-2630-2.
- Varzos, Konstantinos (1984). Η Γενεαλογία των Κομνηνών [The Genealogy of the Komnenoi] (PDF) (in Greek). Vol. B. Thessaloniki: Centre for Byzantine Studies, University of Thessaloniki. pp. 807–840.

Isaac II Angelos Angelid dynasty Born: September 1156 Died: January 1204
Regnal titles
Preceded by Andronikos I Komnenos	Byzantine emperor 1185–1195	Succeeded by Alexios III Angelos
Preceded by Alexios III Angelos	Byzantine emperor 1203–1204 with Alexios IV Angelos (1203–1204)	Succeeded by Alexios V Doukas
