= Irene Doukaina =

Byzantine empress from 1081 to 1118

- Augusta
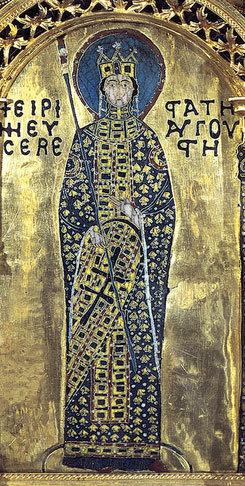
- Probable representation of Irene Doukaina from the Pala d'Oro in St Mark's Basilica in Venice, Italy

Empress consort of the Byzantine Empire
- Tenure: 4 April 1081 – 15 August 1118
- Born: c. 1066; Constantinople (modern-day Istanbul, Turkey)
- Died: 19 February 1138 (aged 71–72)
- Spouse: Alexios I Komnenos
- Issue: Anna Komnene; Maria Komnene; John II Komnenos; Andronikos Komnenos; Isaac Komnenos; Eudokia Komnene; Theodora Komnene; Manuel Komnenos; Zoe Komnene
- House: Doukas
- Father: Andronikos Doukas
- Mother: Maria of Bulgaria
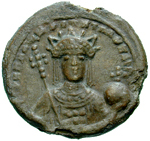
- Seal

Irene Doukaina or Ducaena (Greek: Εἰρήνη Δούκαινα, Eirēnē Doúkaina; c. 1066 – 19 February 1138) was a Byzantine empress by marriage to the Byzantine emperor Alexios I Komnenos. She was the mother of Emperor John II Komnenos and the historian Anna Komnene. She was initially heavily overshadowed and humiliated in influence and power by her mother-in-law Anna Dalassene, but after her retirement and death, Irene was able to exert increasing influence over her husband Alexios I Komnenos, and became powerful towards the end of his reign. But even so, she could not arrange his successor according to her wishes, which favoured her daughter Anna Komnene over her son John II Komnenos.

== Life ==
Irene was born in 1066 to Andronikos Doukas and Maria of Bulgaria, granddaughter of Ivan Vladislav of Bulgaria. Andronikos was a nephew of Emperor Constantine X Doukas and a cousin of Michael VII.

=== Succession of Alexios ===
Irene married Alexios in 1078, when she was still eleven years old. For this reason, the Doukas family supported Alexios in 1081, when a struggle for the throne erupted after the abdication of Nikephoros III Botaneiates. Alexios' mother, Anna Dalassene, a lifelong enemy of the Doukas family, pressured her son to divorce the young Irene and marry Maria of Alania, the former wife of both Michael VII and Nikephoros III. Irene was in fact barred from the coronation ceremony, but the Doukas family convinced the Patriarch of Constantinople, Kosmas I, to crown her as well, which he did one week later. Anna Dalassene consented to this but forced Kosmas to resign immediately afterwards; he was succeeded by Eustratios Garidas.

=== Empress ===
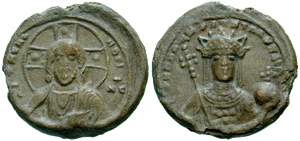
Lead seal of Irene Doukaina, depicting Jesus on the obverse and herself on the reverse

Alexios' mother Anna continued to live in the imperial palace and to meddle in her son's affairs until her death 20 years later; Maria of Alania may have also lived in the palace, and there were rumours that Alexios carried on an affair with her. Anna Komnene denied this, although she herself was not born until December 1, 1083, two years later.

Anna may have been whitewashing her family history; she has nothing but praise for both of her parents. She describes her mother in great detail:

"She stood upright like some young sapling, erect and evergreen, all her limbs and the other parts of her body absolutely symmetrical and in harmony one with another. With her lovely appearance and charming voice she never ceased to fascinate all who saw and heard her. Her face shone with the soft light of the moon; it was not the completely round face of an Assyrian woman, nor long, like the face of a Scyth, but just slightly oval in shape. There were rose blossoms on her cheeks, visible a long way off. Her light-blue eyes were both gay and stern: their charm and beauty attracted, but the fear they caused so dazzled the bystander that he could neither look nor turn away...Generally she accompanied her words with graceful gestures, her hands bare to the wrists, and you would say it was ivory turned by some craftsman into the form of fingers and hand. The pupils of her eyes, with the brilliant blue of deep waves, recalled a calm, still sea, while the white surrounding them shone by contrast, so that the whole eye acquired a peculiar lustre and a charm which was inexpressible."

It "would not have been so very inappropriate," Anna writes, to say that Irene was "Athena made manifest to the human race, or that she had descended suddenly from the sky in some heavenly glory and unapproachable splendour."

Irene was shy and preferred not to appear in public, although she was forceful and severe when acting officially as empress (basileia). She preferred to perform her household duties, and enjoyed reading hagiographic literature and making charitable donations to monks and beggars. Although Alexios may have had Maria as a mistress early in his reign, during the later part of his reign he and Irene were genuinely in love (at least according to their daughter Anna). Irene often accompanied him on his expeditions, including the expedition against Prince Bohemund I of Antioch in 1107 and to the Chersonese in 1112. On these campaigns she acted as a nurse for her husband when he was afflicted with gout in his feet. According to Anna she also acted as a sort of guard, as there were constant conspiracies against Alexios. Alexios' insistence that Irene accompany him on campaigns may suggest that he did not fully trust her enough to leave her in the capital. When she did remain behind in Constantinople, she acted as regent, together with Nikephoros Bryennios, Anna's husband, as a counselor. Around 1112, Alexios fell sick with rheumatism and could not move. He therefore turned the civil government and control of access to him over to his wife, Irene; she in turn directed the administration to Bryennios.

=== Empress Dowager ===
As has been confirmed, it did not matter whether Anna attained the position of empress in her own right or as a wife; Irene desired this position for her daughter. Irene frequently suggested that Alexios name Nikephoros and Anna as his heirs, over their own younger son John. According to Niketas Choniates, who depicts her more as a nagging shrew than a loving wife, she "...threw her full influence on the side of her daughter Anna and lost no opportunity to calumniate their son John... mocking him as rash, pleasure-loving, and weak in character." Alexios, preferring to create a stable dynasty through his own son, either ignored her, pretended to be busy with other matters, or lost his temper and chastised her for suggesting such things.

Irene nursed Alexios on his deathbed on 1118, while at the same time still scheming to have Nikephoros and Anna succeed him. Alexios had already promised the throne to John, and when John took his father's signet ring Irene accused him of treachery and theft. When Alexios finally died, she felt genuine grief, and wore the mourning clothes of her daughter Eudokia, whose own husband had died previously. However, she soon conspired with Anna against John, but their plots were unsuccessful and both Irene and Anna were then forced into exile at the Kecharitomene nunnery, which Irene had founded a few years previously. It was not a harsh exile, and Irene lived there in peace, distributing food to the poor and educating young orphan girls. Irene may have inspired the history written by her son-in-law Nikephoros Bryennios and corresponded with or patronized several important literary figures, including Theophylact of Ohrid and Michael Italikos.

== In literature ==
The great modern Greek poet Constantine Cavafy includes a reference to Irene Doukaina in his poem "A Byzantine Nobleman in Exile Composing Verses", which refers to Doukaina as "that viper Irini Doukaina" and that as the cause of the titular nobleman's exile, "may she be cursed". It is a clear reference to her reputation as a plotter.

== Children ==
Irene died on February 19, 1138. With Alexios I Komnenos she had nine children:

- Anna Komnene (1083–1153)
- Maria Komnene
- John II Komnenos (1087–1143)
- Andronikos Komnenos
- Isaac Komnenos
- Eudokia Komnene
- Theodora Komnene, who married Constantine Angelos. Among their children were John Doukas (who took his grandmother's surname), father of the first two rulers of the Despotate of Epirus, Michael I Komnenos Doukas and Theodore Komnenos Doukas, and Andronikos Doukas Angelos, father of the emperors Isaac II Angelos and Alexios III Angelos.
- Manuel Komnenos
- Zoe Komnene

== Sources ==
- Kazhdan, Alexander, ed. (1991). The Oxford Dictionary of Byzantium. Oxford and New York: Oxford University Press. ISBN 0-19-504652-8.
- Anna Comnena, The Alexiad, trans. E.R.A. Sewter. Penguin Books, 1969.
- Choniates, Nicetas (1984). O City of Byzantium, Annals of Niketas Choniatēs. Translated by Harry J. Magoulias. Detroit: Wayne State University Press. ISBN 0-8143-1764-2.
- Georgina Buckler, Anna Comnena: A Study. Oxford University Press, 1929.
- Thalia Goumia-Peterson, "Gender and Power: Passages to the Maternal in Anna Komnene's Alexiad ", in Anna Komnene and Her Times, ed. Thalia Goumia-Peterson. Garland Publishing, 2000.
- Treadgold, Warren (1997). A History of the Byzantine State and Society. Stanford, California: Stanford University Press. ISBN 0-8047-2630-2.

Irene Doukaina Doukas Born: c. 1066 Died: 19 February 1138
Royal titles
Preceded by Maria of Alania	Byzantine Empress consort 1081–1118	Succeeded by Irene of Hungary
