= Alexios I Komnenos =

Byzantine emperor from 1081 to 1118

- Emperor and Autocrat of the Romans
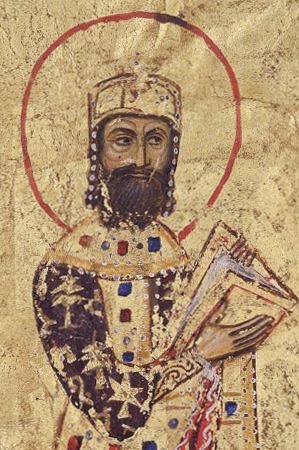
- Portrait of Alexios within the Panoplia Dogmatica written by Euthymios Zigabenos

Byzantine emperor
- Reign: 1 April 1081 (Note: "It was Holy Thursday [...] in the fourth indiction in the month of April 6589. [He] poured into the city through the Charisian Gate".) – 15 August 1118
- Coronation: 4 April 1081
- Predecessor: Nikephoros III Botaneiates
- Successor: John II Komnenos
- Co-emperor: Constantine Doukas (1081–87)
- Born: c. 1057
- Died: 15 August 1118 (aged 60–61)
- Spouse: Irene Doukaina
- Issue: Anna Komnene; Maria Komnene; John II Komnenos; Andronikos Komnenos; Isaac Komnenos; Eudokia Komnene; Theodora Komnene; Manuel Komnenos; Zoe Komnene
Names
- Alexios Komnenos; Αλέξιος Κομνηνός
- Dynasty: Komnenian
- Father: John Komnenos
- Mother: Anna Dalassene
- Religion: Eastern Orthodox

Alexios I Komnenos (Greek: Ἀλέξιος Κομνηνός, romanized: Aléxios Komnēnós, c. 1057 – 15 August 1118), Latinized as Alexius I Comnenus, was Byzantine emperor from 1081 to 1118. After usurping the imperial office he was faced with a collapsing empire and constant warfare throughout his reign. Alexios was able to curb the Byzantine decline and begin the military, financial, and territorial recovery known as the Komnenian restoration. His appeals to Western Europe for help against the Seljuk Turks were the catalyst that sparked the First Crusade. Although he was not the first emperor of the Komnenian dynasty, it was during his reign that the Komnenos family came to full power and initiated a hereditary succession to the throne.

The son of John Komnenos and a nephew of Isaac I Komnenos, Alexios served with distinction under three Byzantine emperors. In 1081, he led a rebellion against Emperor Nikephoros III Botaneiates and took the throne for himself. He immediately faced an invasion of the western Balkans by the Normans under Robert Guiscard and his son Bohemond. Despite initial defeats, Alexios secured an alliance with Holy Roman Emperor Henry IV and drove back the Normans, recovering most of Byzantine losses by 1085. In 1091, he achieved a decisive victory over the Pechenegs at the Battle of Levounion in Thrace with the help of Cuman allies.

Later in the 1090s, Alexios directed his attention towards Asia Minor, most of which had fallen to the Seljuk Turks. Desiring western support, he took reconciliatory measures towards the Papacy, and in 1095 his envoys made a formal appeal to Pope Urban II at the Council of Piacenza. At the subsequent Council of Clermont, Pope Urban formally called the First Crusade, which began a year after and concluded with much of western Anatolia restored to Byzantine rule. On Alexios's death in 1118, he was succeeded by his son John II Komnenos. Alexios's reign and campaigns were recorded by his daughter Anna Komnene in her Alexiad, a political and military history, which she named after her father.

== Biography ==
Alexios was the son of John Komnenos and Anna Dalassene, and the nephew of Isaac I Komnenos (emperor 1057–1059). Alexios's father declined the throne on the abdication of Isaac, who was thus succeeded by Constantine X Doukas (r. 1059–1067) and died as a monk in 1067. Alexios and his elder brother, Manuel Komnenos served under Romanos IV Diogenes (r. 1068–1071) with distinction against the Seljuk Turks. under Michael VII Doukas Parapinakes (1071–1078) and Nikephoros III Botaneiates (1078–1081), he was militarily employed, along with his elder brother Isaac, against rebels in Asia Minor, Thrace, and in Epirus.

In 1074, western mercenaries led by Roussel de Bailleul rebelled in Asia Minor, but Alexios successfully subdued them by 1076. In 1078, he was appointed commander of the field army in the West by Nikephoros III. In this capacity, Alexios defeated the rebellions of Nikephoros Bryennios the Elder (whose son or grandson later married Alexios's daughter Anna) and Nikephoros Basilakes, the first at the Battle of Kalavrye and the latter in a surprise night attack on his camp.Alexios was ordered to march against his brother-in-law Nikephoros Melissenos in Asia Minor but refused to fight his kinsman. This did not, however, lead to a demotion, as Alexios was needed to counter the expected invasion of the Normans of Southern Italy, led by Robert Guiscard.

=== Conspiracy and revolt of the Komnenoi against Botaneiates ===
While Byzantine troops were assembling for the expedition, the Doukas faction at court approached Alexios and convinced him to join a conspiracy against Nikephoros III. The mother of Alexios, Anna Dalassene, was to play a prominent role in this coup d'état of 1081, along with the current empress, Maria of Alania. First married to Michael VII Doukas and secondly to Nikephoros III Botaneiates, she was preoccupied with the future of her son by Michael VII, Constantine Doukas. Nikephoros III intended to leave the throne to one of his close relatives, and this resulted in Maria's ambivalence and alliance with the Komnenoi, though the real driving force behind this political alliance was Anna Dalassene.

The empress was already closely connected to the Komnenoi through Maria's cousin, Irene who had been married to Isaac Komnenos, thus the Komnenos brothers were able to treat her as member of the family's enlarged kinship. Furthermore, by espousing the custom of adoptive kingship, which was a social trend in the palace during the reign of empress Zoe, Maria had accepted to adopt Alexios as her son in order to aid the conspiracy. Maria was induced to do so on advice of her own "Alans", that is her Georgian entourage, and her eunuchs, the latter being instructed by Isaac Komnenos to talk the empress into. Apparently, Anna must have been informed of the arrangement of the adoptive kingship, and her tacit agreement on the matter allowed for the final conclusion of Alexios's adoption by the empress. As a result, Alexios became the adoptive brother of Constantine Doukas's, natural son of empress Maria. The completion of the adoptive kingship entailed as part of the ritual performed from the adoptive member's behalf pledging an oath of loyalty and allegiance to the heir of the throne, a typical practice in which the prospective member since he bore no blood relation and was not of imperial lineage he had to be tied to the emperor's person by a sacred oath. Therefore, both Alexios and his brother, Isaac pledged to safeguard the heir's rights to the throne.

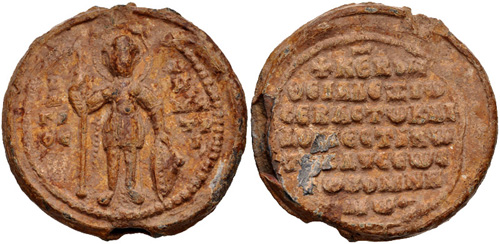
Seal of Alexios as "Grand Domestic of the West"

According to Anna Comnena's narrative in the Alexiad, Isaac and Alexios left Constantinople in mid-February 1081 to raise an army against Botaneiates. When the time was right and the army already marching to the capital, Anna Dalassene quickly and surreptitiously mobilised the remainder of the family and took sanctuary in the cathedral of Hagia Sophia, wherefrom she negotiated with Nikephoros III Botaneiates for the safety of her family, while disclaiming her two sons' hostile actions against the emperor. Anna Comnena offers in detail the course of steps her grandmother took to be able to enter the church. Under the pretence of making a vesperal visit to worship at the church, she deliberately excluded the grandson of Botaneiates and his loyal tutor, and met with her sons Alexios and Isaac and went with them to the forum of Constantine. When the tutor discovered she had gone missing, he went looking for her to eventually find her on the palace's grounds. Yet again cunningly Anna convinced him that they would leave the palace shortly. However, the rest of the female members of her family in order to be allowed to gain entrance although the church was at that time closed, pretended to be pilgrims from Cappadocia who had been penniless and wanted to prostrate the holy icons before their return trip. Straboromanos and royal guards who were caught up with them, were summoned back to the palace. Anna then went on protesting for the safety of her family, that she feared of the emperor's wrath and that her sons were nothing but loyal subjects, despite the fact that Alexios and Isaac were discovered to be missing without the emperor's consent. She even suggested that a plot had been unravelling by enemies of the family to have them blinded and for that she had fled to the capital so they may continue to be of loyal service to the emperor. She refused to go with them and demanded that they allow her to pray to the Mother of God for protection. This request was granted and Anna then manifested her true communicative and leadership capabilities:

She was allowed to enter. As if she were weighed down with old age and worn out by grief, she walked slowly and when she approached the actual entrance to the sanctuary made two genuflections; on the third she sank to the floor and taking firm hold of the sacred doors, cried in a loud voice: "Unless my hands are cut off, I will not leave this holy place except on one condition: that I receive the emperor's cross as guarantee of safety".

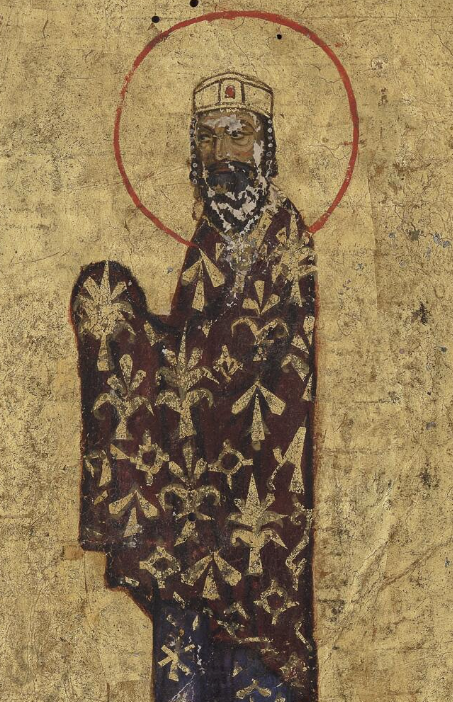
Alexios I in a 12th-century Greek manuscript, Vatican library

Nikephoros III Botaneiates was forced into a public vow that he would grant protection to the family. Straboromanos tried to give Anna his cross, but for her it was not large enough for all bystanders to witness the oath. She also demanded that the cross be personally sent by Botaneiates as a vow of his good faith. He obliged, sending a complete assurance for the family with his own cross. At the emperor's further insistence, and for their own protection, they took refuge at the convent of Petrion, where they were eventually joined by Maria of Bulgaria, mother of Irene Doukaina. Botaneiates allowed them to be treated as refugees rather than as guests. They were allowed to have family members bring in their own food and were on good terms with the guards from whom they learned the latest news. Anna was highly successful in three important aspects of the revolt: she bought time for her sons to steal imperial horses from the stables and escape the city; she distracted the emperor, giving her sons time to gather and arm their troops; and she gave a false sense of security to Botaneiates that there was no real treasonous plot against him. After bribing the Western troops guarding the city, Isaac and Alexios Komnenos entered the capital victoriously on 1 April 1081.

During this time, Alexios was rumored to be the lover of Empress Maria, the daughter of King Bagrat IV of Georgia, who had been successively married to Michael VII Doukas and his successor Nikephoros III Botaneiates, and who was renowned for her beauty. Alexios arranged for Maria to stay on the palace grounds, and it was thought that he was considering marrying her. However, his mother consolidated the Doukas family connection by arranging the Emperor's marriage to Irene Doukaina, granddaughter of the Caesar John Doukas, the uncle of Michael VII, who would not have supported Alexios otherwise. As a measure intended to keep the support of the Doukai, Alexios restored Constantine Doukas, the young son of Michael VII and Maria, as co-emperor.

This situation changed drastically, however, when Alexios's first son John II Komnenos was born in 1087: Anna's engagement to Constantine was dissolved, and she was moved to the main Palace to live with her mother and grandmother. Alexios became estranged from Maria, who was stripped of her imperial title and retired to a monastery, and Constantine Doukas was deprived of his status as co-emperor.

=== Wars against the Normans, Pechenegs, and Tzachas ===
The thirty-seven year reign of Alexios was full of struggle. At the outset he faced the formidable attack of the Normans, led by Robert Guiscard and his son Bohemond, who took Dyrrhachium and Corfu and laid siege to Larissa in Thessaly. Alexios suffered several defeats before he was able to strike back with success. He enhanced his resistance by an agreement with the German king Henry IV, who, in exchange for 360,000 gold pieces, did attack the Normans in Italy, which forced the Normans to concentrate on their defenses at home in 1083–84. He also secured the alliance of Henry, Count of Monte Sant'Angelo, who controlled the Gargano Peninsula and dated his charters by Alexios's reign. Henry's allegiance would be the last example of Byzantine political control on peninsular Italy. The Norman military danger subsided with the death of Guiscard in 1085, and the Byzantines recovered most of their losses.

Alexios next had to deal with disturbances in Thrace, where the heretical sects of the Bogomils and the Paulicians revolted and made common cause with the Pechenegs from beyond the Danube. Paulician soldiers in imperial service likewise deserted during Alexios's battles with the Normans. As soon as the Norman threat had passed, Alexios set out to punish the rebels and deserters, confiscating their lands. This led to a further revolt near Philippopolis, and the commander of the field army in the west, Gregory Pakourianos, was defeated and killed in the ensuing battle. In 1087 the Pechenegs raided into Thrace, and Alexios crossed into Moesia to retaliate but failed to take Dorostolon (Silistra). During his retreat, the emperor was confronted and defeated by the Pechenegs, who forced him to sign a truce and to pay protection money. In 1090 the Pechenegs invaded Thrace again, while Tzachas, the brother-in-law of the Sultan of Rum, launched a fleet and attempted to arrange a joint siege of Constantinople with the Pechenegs. Alexios overcame this crisis by entering into an alliance with a horde of 40,000 Cumans, with whose help he conquered the Pechenegs at Levounion in Thrace on 29 April 1091.

This put an end to the Pecheneg threat, but in 1094 the Cumans began to raid the imperial territories in the Balkans. Led by a pretender claiming to be Constantine Diogenes, a long-dead son of the Emperor Romanos IV, the Cumans crossed the mountains and raided into eastern Thrace until their leader was eliminated at Adrianople. With the Balkans more or less pacified, Alexios could now turn his attention to Asia Minor, which had been almost completely overrun by the Seljuq Turks.

=== Byzantine–Seljuq Wars and the First Crusade ===
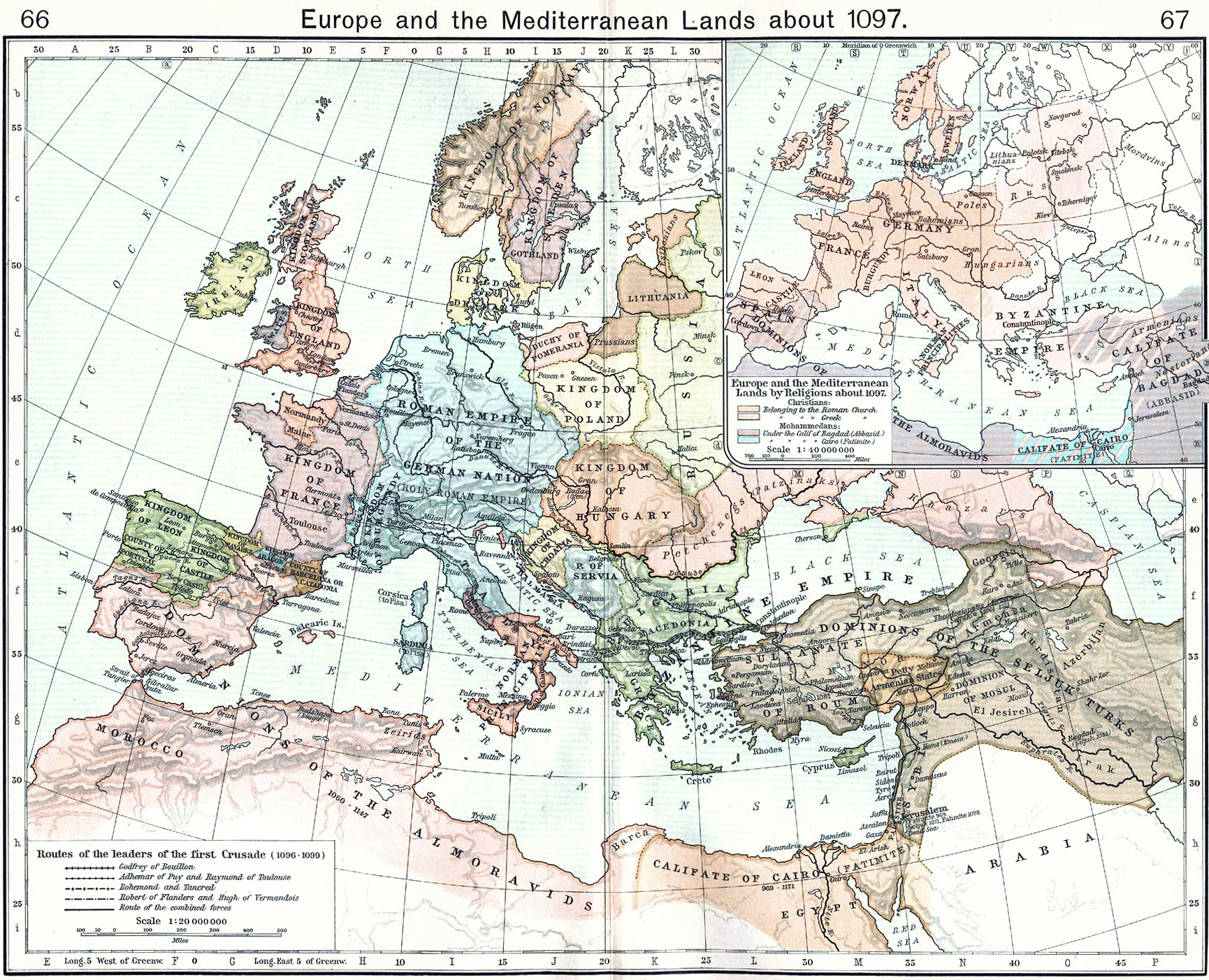
Europe in 1097, during the First Crusade

By the time Alexios ascended the throne, the Seljuqs had taken most of Asia Minor. Alexios secured much of the coastal regions by sending peasant soldiers to raid the Seljuq camps, but this did not stop the Turks altogether. He also got military support from Western rulers like Robert I, Count of Flanders (Robert the Frisian). Robert, while returning from an armed pilgrimage to Jerusalem in 1086, spent time assisting the Byzantine Emperor against the Turks. In one battle, Robert and three of his companions rode ahead of the main army, charging the forces under the command of Kerbogha, whose forces were scattered completely.

As early as 1090, Alexios had taken reconciliatory measures towards the Papacy, with the intention of seeking western support against the Seljuqs. In 1095 his ambassadors appeared before Pope Urban II at the Council of Piacenza. (Note: Main historic authority on the proceedings of this event is Bernold of Constance.) The help he sought from the West was some mercenary forces, not the immense hosts that arrived, to his consternation and embarrassment, after the pope preached the First Crusade at the Council of Clermont later that same year. This was the People's Crusade: a mob of mostly unarmed poor peasants and serfs, led by the preacher Peter the Hermit, fleeing from hunger in their home regions to a promised land of milk and honey. Not quite ready to supply this number of people as they traversed his territories, the emperor saw his Balkan possessions subjected to further pillage at the hands of his own allies. Eventually Alexios dealt with the People's Crusade by hustling them on to Asia Minor. There, they were massacred by the Turks of Kilij Arslan I at the Battle of Civetot in October 1096.

The "Prince's Crusade", the second and much more formidable host of Crusaders, gradually made its way to Constantinople, led in sections by Godfrey of Bouillon, Bohemond of Taranto, Raymond IV of Toulouse, and other important western nobles. Alexios met the Crusader leaders separately as they arrived, extracting from them oaths of homage and the promise to turn over conquered lands to the Byzantine Empire. Transferring each contingent into Asia, Alexios promised to supply them with provisions in return for their oaths of homage. The Crusade was a notable success for Byzantium, as Alexios recovered a number of important cities and islands. The siege of Nicaea by the Crusaders forced the city to surrender to the emperor in 1097, and the subsequent Crusader victory at Dorylaion enabled Alexios to recover much of western Asia Minor. John Doukas re-established Byzantine rule in Chios, Rhodes, Smyrna, Ephesus, Sardis, and Philadelphia in 1097–1099. This success is ascribed by Alexios's daughter Anna to his policy and diplomacy, but by the Latin historians of the crusade to his treachery and deception. In 1099, he sent a Byzantine fleet of ten ships to assist the Crusaders in capturing Laodicea and other coastal towns as far as Tripoli. The Crusaders believed their oaths were made invalid when the Byzantine contingent under Tatikios failed to help them during the siege of Antioch; Bohemund, who had set himself up as Prince of Antioch, did not return the ancient city, despite his previous agreement with Alexios. He briefly went to war with Alexios in the Balkans, but he was blockaded by the Byzantine forces and agreed to become a vassal of Alexios by the Treaty of Deabolis in 1108.

Around this time, in 1106, the twenty-fifth year of his reign, Hesychius of Miletus records that the sky suddenly darkened and a "violent southern wind" blew the great statue of Constantine at the Strategion from its column, killing a number of men and women nearby.

In 1116, though already terminally ill, Alexios conducted a series of defensive operations in Bithynia and Mysia to defend his Anatolian territories against the inroads of Malik Shah, the Seljuq Sultan of Iconium. In 1117 he moved onto the offensive and pushed his army deep into the Turkish-dominated Anatolian Plateau, where he defeated the Seljuq sultan at the Battle of Philomelion.

== Personal life ==
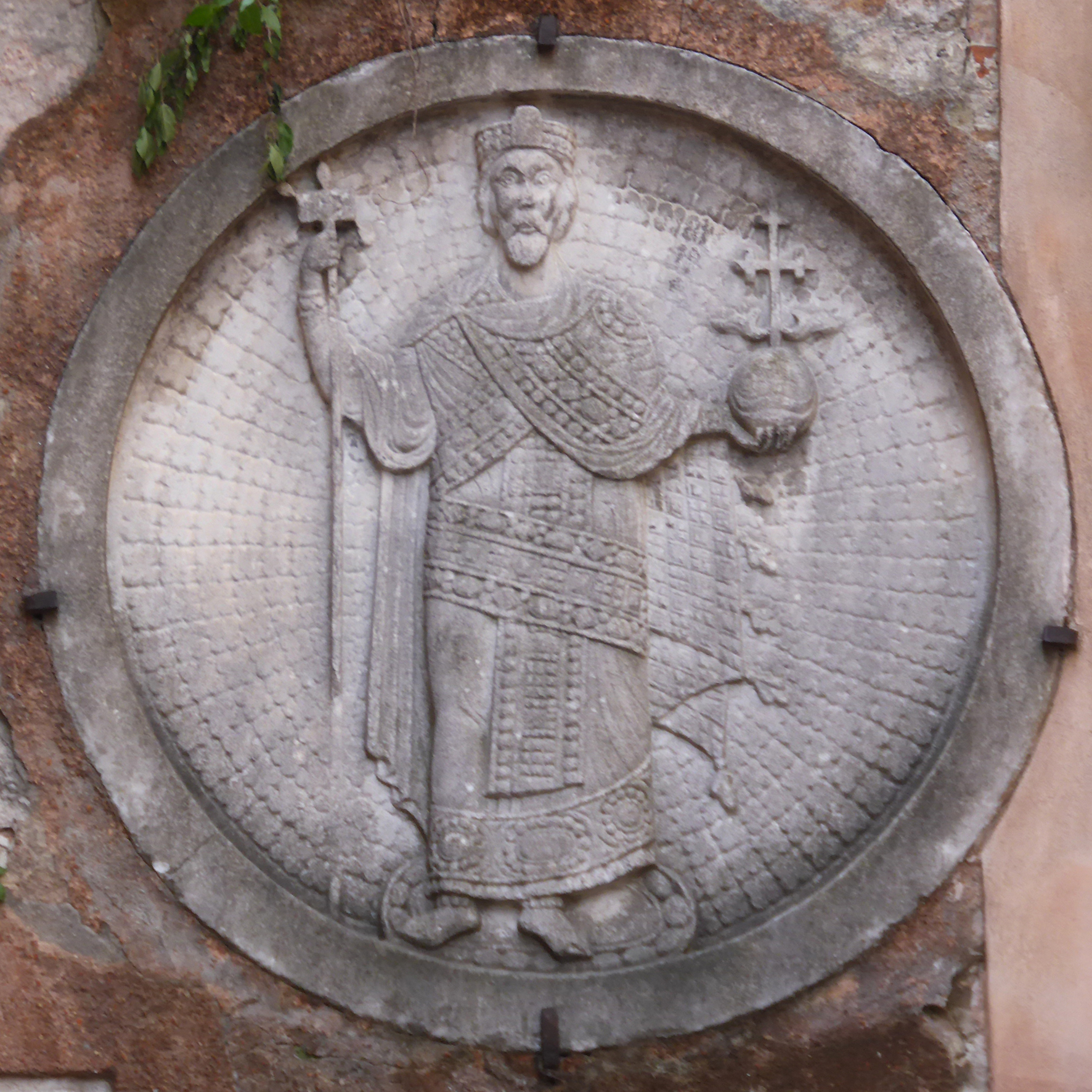
Low relief depicting Alexios I, Campiello de Cà Angaran, Venice, early 12th century.

During the last twenty years of his life Alexios lost much of his popularity. The years were marked by persecution of the followers of the Paulician and Bogomil heresies—one of his last acts was publicly to burn at the stake Basil, a Bogomil leader, with whom he had engaged in a theological dispute. In spite of the success of the First Crusade, Alexios also had to repel numerous attempts on his territory by the Seljuqs in 1110–1117.

Alexios was for many years under the strong influence of an eminence grise, his mother Anna Dalassene, an able politician whom, in an irregular fashion, he had crowned as Augusta instead of the rightful claimant to the title, his wife Irene Doukaina. Anna Dalassene's ability to help him seize power and control the aristocracy, as well as her ability to understand and resolve dilemmas, assured Alexios that his mother was a capable counsel and managing partner by his side, and trusted regent in his absence. Alexios preferred to take part in military exercises and he assumed personal command of his troops whenever possible. As such, Dalassene was the effective administrator of the Empire during Alexios's long absences in military campaigns. She was constantly at odds with her daughter-in-law and had assumed total responsibility for the upbringing and education of her granddaughter Anna Komnene.

=== Succession ===
Alexios's last years were also troubled by anxieties over the succession. Although he had crowned his son John II Komnenos co-emperor at the age of five in 1092, his wife Irene Doukaina wished to alter the succession in favor of their daughter Anna and Anna's husband, Nikephoros Bryennios the Younger.

== Pretenders and rebels ==
Apart from all of his external enemies, a host of rebels also sought to overthrow Alexios from the imperial throne, thereby posing another major threat to his reign. Due to the troubled times the empire was enduring, he faced more rebellions than any other Byzantine emperor. These included:

=== Pre First Crusade ===
- Raictor, a Byzantine monk who claimed to be the emperor Michael VII. He presented himself to Robert Guiscard who used him as a pretext to launch his invasion of the Byzantine Empire.
- A conspiracy in 1084 involving several senators and officers of the army. This was uncovered before too many followers were enlisted. In order to conceal the importance of the conspiracy, Alexios merely banished the wealthiest plotters and confiscated their estates.
- Tzachas, a Seljuq Turkic emir who assumed the title of emperor in 1092.
- Constantine Humbertopoulos, who had assisted Alexios in gaining the throne in 1081, conspired against him in 1091 with an Armenian called Ariebes.
- John Komnenos, Alexios's nephew, governor of Dyrrachium, accused of a conspiracy by Theophylact of Bulgaria.
- Theodore Gabras, the quasi-independent governor of Trebizond, and his son Gregory.
- Michael Taronites, the brother-in-law of Alexios.
- Nikephoros Diogenes, the son of emperor Romanos IV.
- Pseudo-Leo Diogenes, an impostor who assumed the identity of another of Romanos's sons, Leo Diogenes.
- Karykes, the leader of a revolt in Crete.
- Rhapsomates, who tried to create an independent kingdom in Cyprus.

=== Post First Crusade ===
- Salomon, a senator of great wealth who in 1106 engaged in a plot with four brothers of the Anemas family.
- Gregory Taronites, another governor of Trebizond.
- The illegitimate descendant of a Bulgarian prince named Aron formed a plot in 1107 to murder Alexios as he was encamped near Thessalonica. The presence of the empress Irene and her attendants, however, made the execution of the plot difficult. In an attempt to have her return to Constantinople, the conspirators produced pamphlets that mocked and slandered the empress, and left them in her tent. A search for the author of the publications uncovered the whole plot, yet Aron was only banished due to his connection to the royal line of Bulgaria, whose blood also flowed in the veins of the empress Irene.

== Reform of the monetary system ==
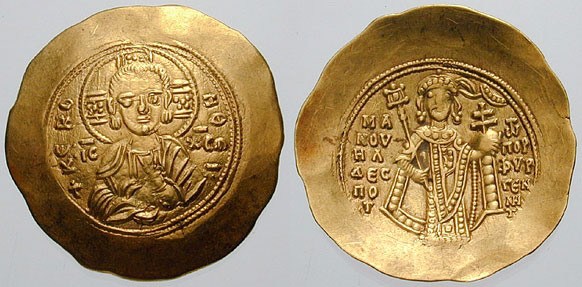
Scyphate (cup-shaped) hyperpyron minted under Manuel I Komnenos

Under Alexios the debased solidus (tetarteron and histamenon) was discontinued and a gold coinage of higher fineness (generally .900–.950) was established in 1092, commonly called the hyperpyron at 4.45 grs. The hyperpyron was slightly smaller than the solidus

It was introduced along with the electrum aspron trachy worth a third of a hyperpyron and about 25% gold and 75% silver, the billon aspron trachy or stamenon, valued at 48 to the hyperpyron and with 7% silver wash and the copper tetarteron and noummion worth 18 and 36 to the billon aspron trachy.

== Legacy ==
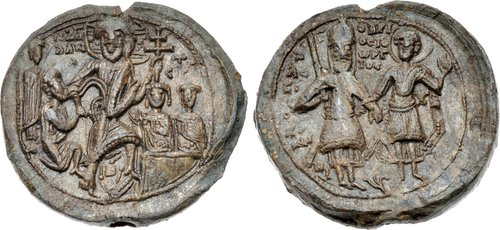
Rare seal of Alexios I with a depiction of the Resurrection

Alexios I had overcome dangerous crises and stabilised the Byzantine Empire, inaugurating a century of imperial prosperity and success. He had also profoundly altered the nature of the Byzantine government. By seeking close alliances with powerful noble families, Alexios put an end to the tradition of imperial exclusivity and co-opted most of the nobility into his extended family and, through it, his government. Those who did not become part of this extended family were deprived of power and prestige. This measure, which was intended to diminish opposition, was paralleled by the introduction of new courtly dignities, like that of panhypersebastos given to Nikephoros Bryennios, or that of sebastokrator given to the emperor's brother Isaac Komnenos. Although this policy met with initial success, it gradually undermined the relative effectiveness of imperial bureaucracy by placing family connections over merit. Alexios's policy of integration of the nobility bore the fruit of continuity: every Byzantine emperor who reigned after Alexios I Komnenos was related to him by either descent or marriage.

== Family ==
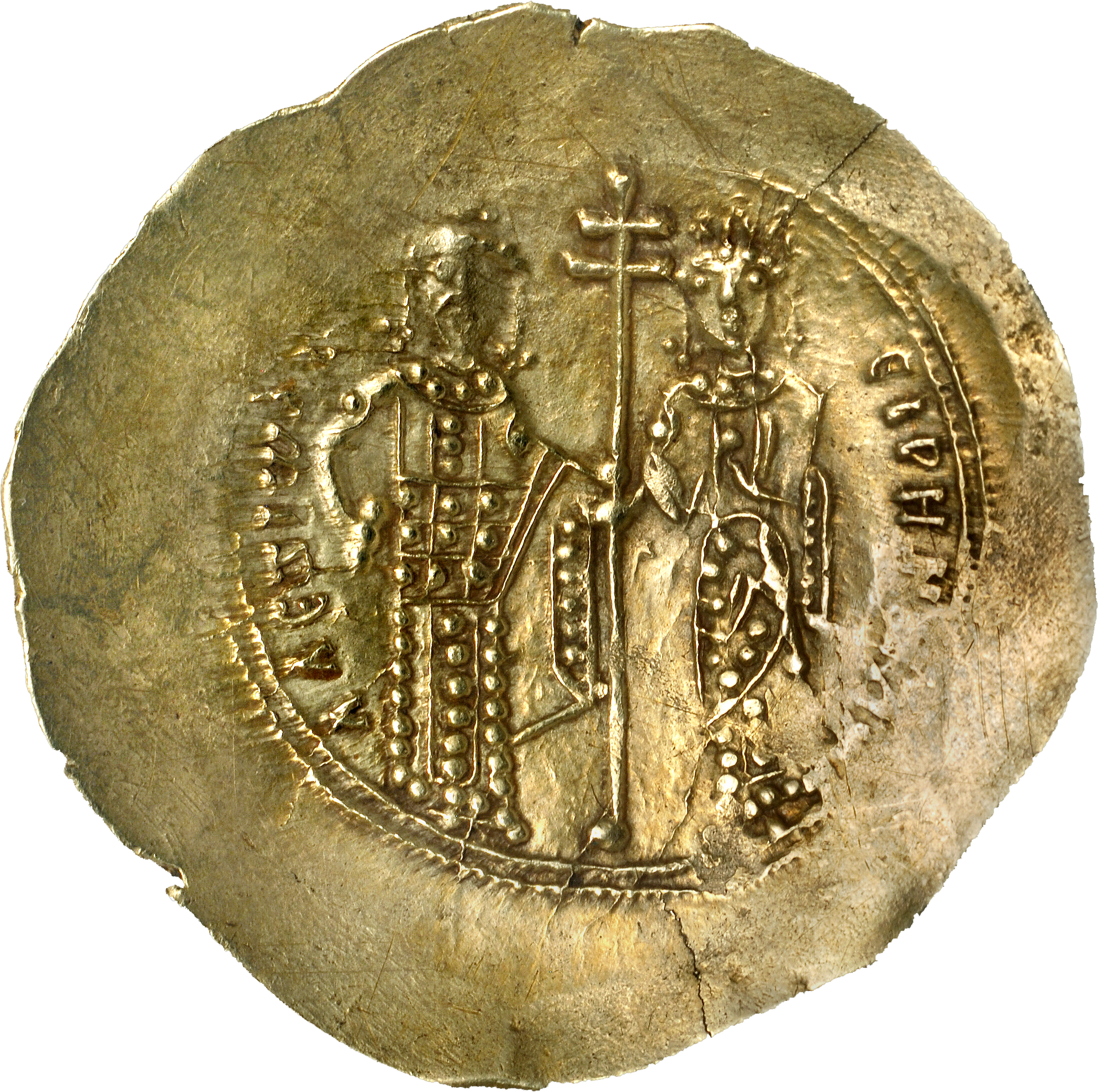
Aspron trachy depicting Alexios I and Irene Doukaina.

By his marriage with Irene Doukaina, Alexios I had the following children:

1. Anna Komnene (1 December 1083 – 1148/55), in her infancy she was betrothed to Constantine Doukas, and with him treated as co-ruler by her father until after the birth of John II. In 1097 she married Nikephoros Bryennios the Younger, later raised to Caesar. Highly ambitious, after Alexios's death she tried unsuccessfully to usurp the throne. She then withdrew to a monastery, where she wrote her history of Alexios's reign. The couple had several children, but only four survived her.
2. Maria Komnene (19 September 1085 – after 1136), initially betrothed to Gregory Gabras, but married to Nikephoros Katakalon. The couple had several children, but only two sons are known by name.
3. John II Komnenos (13 September 1087 – 8 April 1143), who succeeded as emperor.
4. Andronikos Komnenos (18 September 1091 – 1130/31), was named sebastokrator and participated in several campaigns until his death from disease. He married Irene, likely a Russian princess, and had at least two sons.
5. Isaac Komnenos (16 January 1093 – after 1152), sebastokrator.
6. Eudokia Komnene (14 January 1094 – c. 1129), who married the son of Constantine Iasites.
7. Theodora Komnene (15 January 1096) who married (1) Constantine Kourtikes and (2) Constantine Angelos. By him she was the grandmother of Emperors Isaac II Angelos and Alexios III Angelos, as well as the progenitor of the ruling dynasty of the Despotate of Epirus. Through Isaac II's daughter Irene Angelina's children by Philip of Swabia, she is an ancestor of many European royal families, including all European monarchs currently reigning.
8. Manuel Komnenos, born February 1097 and known only from a manuscript now in Moscow, died probably soon after his birth
9. Zoe Komnene, born March 1098 and known only from a manuscript now in Moscow, died probably soon after her birth

== See also ==
- Byzantine army (Komnenian era)

== Sources ==
=== Primary sources ===
- Comnena, Anna (1928) [c. 1148]. The Alexiad . Translated by Elizabeth A. S. Dawes – via Wikisource.
- Comnena, Anna (1969) [c. 1148], The Alexiad, translated by Sewter, E. R. A., Penguin Classics, ISBN 9780141904542
- Chisholm, Hugh, ed. (1911). "Bryennius, Nicephorus" . Encyclopædia Britannica (11th ed.). Cambridge University Press.

=== Secondary sources ===
- Choniates, Nicetas (1984). O City of Byzantium, Annals of Niketas Choniatēs. Translated by Harry J. Magoulias. Detroit: Wayne State University Press. ISBN 0-8143-1764-2.
- Dalven, Rae (1972). Anna Comnena. New York: Twayne Publishers. ISBN 978-0805722406.
- Finlay, George (1854), Tozer, Henry F. (ed.), History of the Byzantine and Greek Empires from 1057–1453, vol. 2, William Blackwood & Sons
- Garland, Lynda (25 May 2007), Anna Dalassena, Mother of Alexius I Comnenus (1081–1118), De Imperatoribus Romanis (An Online Encyclopedia of Roman Rulers), archived from the original on 6 May 2016
- Hendy, Michael F. (1999). Catalogue of the Byzantine Coins in the Dumbarton Oaks Collection. Vol. 4, Alexius I to Michael VIII. Dumbarton Oaks. ISBN 9780884022336.
- Kazhdan, Alexander, ed. (1991). "Alexios I Komnenos". The Oxford Dictionary of Byzantium. Oxford and New York: Oxford University Press. ISBN 0-19-504652-8.
- Lindblom, Annette (21 March 1998), Harl, Kenneth W. (ed.), History 303: Early Medieval and Byzantine Civilization: Constantine to Crusades, Tulane.edu, archived from the original on 5 October 2013
- Norwich, John J. (1995). Byzantium: The Decline and Fall. Alfred A. Knopf, Inc. ISBN 978-0-679-41650-0.
- Runciman, Steven (1980). The First Crusade. Cambridge: Cambridge University Press. ISBN 0521232554.
- Somerville, Robert (2011). Pope Urban II's Council of Piacenza. Oxford: Oxford University Press.
- Thomas, Asbridge (2016), The crusades: the authoritative history of the war for the holy land., Ecco, ISBN 978-1-5047-3571-1, OCLC 960237360
- Varzos, Konstantinos (1984). Η Γενεαλογία των Κομνηνών [The Genealogy of the Komnenoi] (in Greek). Vol. A. Thessaloniki: Centre for Byzantine Studies, University of Thessaloniki. OCLC 834784634.

=== Attribution ===
- Bury, John Bagnell (1911). "Alexius I." . In Chisholm, Hugh (ed.). Encyclopædia Britannica. Vol. 1 (11th ed.). Cambridge University Press.

Alexios I Komnenos Komnenos dynasty Born: 1056 Died: 15 August 1118
Regnal titles
Preceded by Nikephoros III	Byzantine emperor 1 April 1081 – 15 August 1118 with Constantine Doukas (1081–1088); John II Komnenos (1092–1118)	Succeeded by John II Komnenos
