= Alexios III Angelos =

Byzantine emperor from 1195 to 1203

- Emperor and Autocrat of the Romans
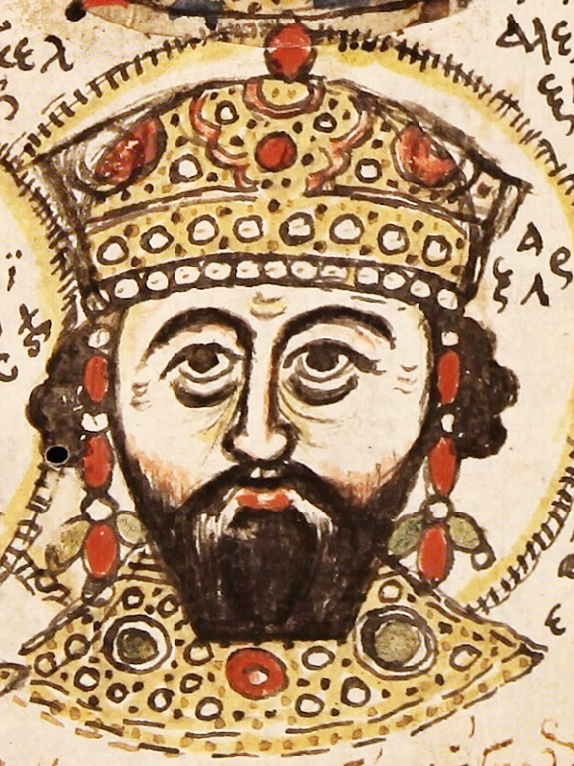
- Miniature portrait of Alexios III (from a 15th-century codex containing a copy of the Extracts of History by Joannes Zonaras)

Byzantine emperor
- Reign: 8 April 1195 – 18 July 1203
- Predecessor: Isaac II Angelos
- Successor: Isaac II Angelos; Alexios IV Angelos
- Rival emperor: John Komnenos (1201)
- Sebastokrator: 1190 – 8 April 1195
- Born: c. 1153
- Died: 1211 (aged c. 57/58)
- Spouse: Euphrosyne Doukaina Kamatera
- Issue: Irene Angelina; Anna Komnene Angelina; Eudokia Angelina
Names
- Alexios Angelos
Regnal name
- Alexios Komnenos
- Dynasty: Angelos
- Father: Andronikos Angelos Doukas
- Mother: Euphrosyne Kastamonitissa
- Religion: Greek Orthodox

Alexios III Angelos (Medieval Greek: Ἀλέξιος Ἄγγελος, romanized: Aléxios Ángelos; c. 1153 – 1211), Latinized as Alexius III Angelus, was Byzantine Emperor from March 1195 to 17/18 July 1203. He reigned under the name Alexios Komnenos (Ἀλέξιος Κομνηνός; Aléxios Komnēnós) associating himself with the Komnenos dynasty (from which he was descended cognatically).

A member of the extended imperial family, Alexios came to the throne after deposing, blinding and imprisoning his younger brother Isaac II Angelos. The most significant event of his reign was the attack of the Fourth Crusade on Constantinople in 1203, on behalf of Alexios IV Angelos.

Alexios III took over the defence of the city, which he mismanaged, and then fled the city at night with one of his three daughters. From Adrianople, and then Mosynopolis, he attempted unsuccessfully to rally his supporters, only to end up a captive of Marquis Boniface I of Montferrat. He was ransomed and sent to Asia Minor where he plotted against his son-in-law Theodore I Laskaris, but was eventually captured and spent his last days confined to the Monastery of Hyakinthos in Nicaea, where he died.

== Early life ==
Alexios III was the second son of Andronikos Angelos Doukas and Euphrosyne Kastamonitissa. Andronikos was himself a son of Theodora Komnene, the youngest daughter of Emperor Alexios I Komnenos and Irene Doukaina. Thus, Alexios III was a member of the extended imperial family. Together with his father and brothers, Alexios had conspired against Emperor Andronikos I Komnenos (c. 1183), and thus he spent several years in exile in Muslim courts, including that of Saladin.

His younger brother Isaac II was threatened with execution under orders of Andronikos I, their first-cousin once-removed, on 11 September 1185. Isaac made a desperate attack on the imperial agents and soon killed their leader Stephen Hagiochristophorites. He then took refuge in the church of Hagia Sophia and from there appealed to the populace. His actions provoked a riot, which resulted in the deposition of Andronikos I and the proclamation of Isaac as Emperor. Alexios was now closer to the imperial throne than ever before.

== Reign ==
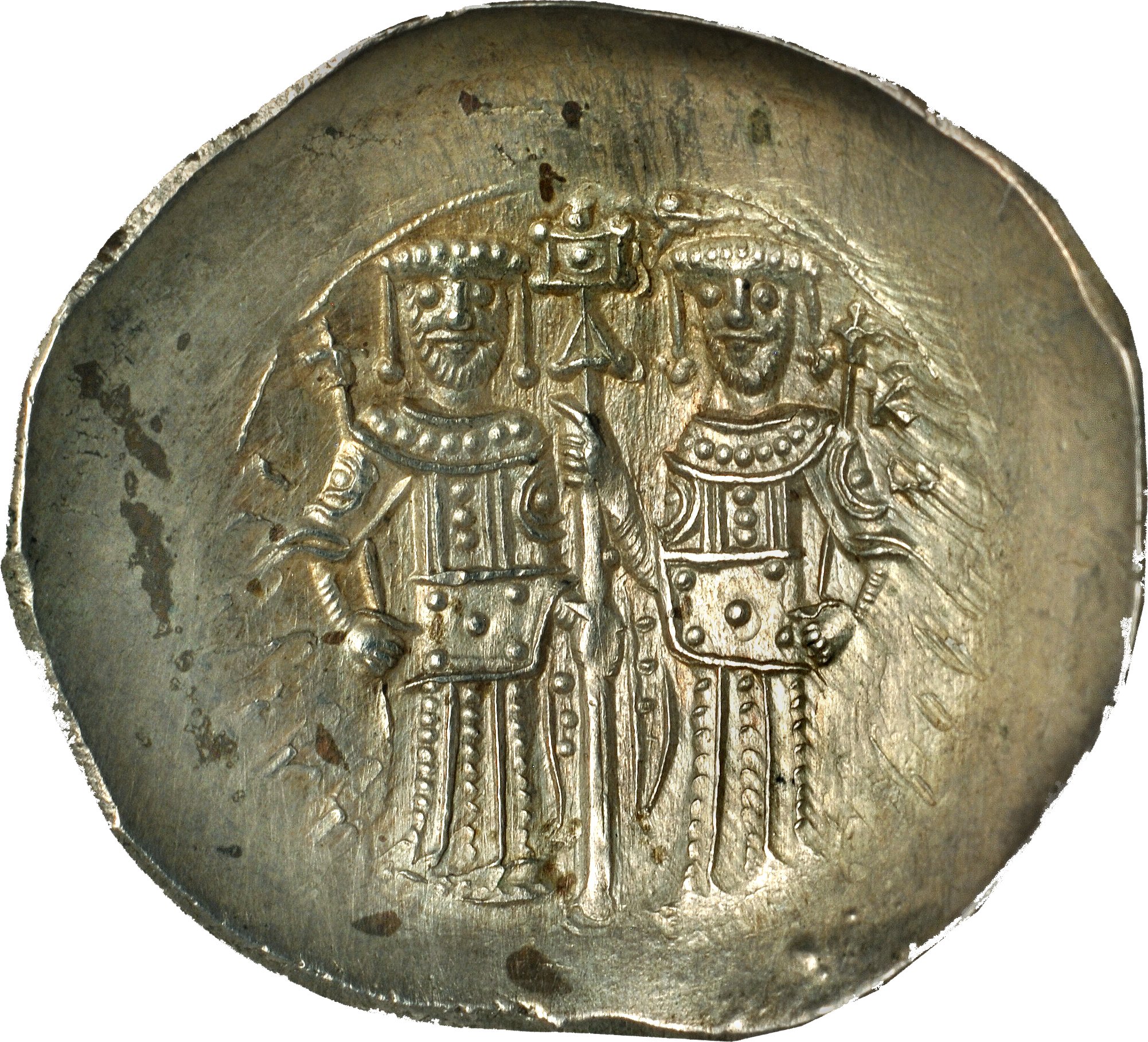
Aspron trachy of Alexios III alongside Constantine the Great.

By 1190 Alexios had returned to the court of his younger brother, from whom he received the elevated title of sebastokratōr. In March 1195 while Isaac II was away hunting in Thrace, Alexios was acclaimed as emperor by the troops with the covert support of his wife Euphrosyne Doukaina Kamatera. Alexios captured Isaac at Stagira in Macedonia, put out his eyes, and thenceforth kept him a close prisoner, despite having previously been redeemed by Isaac from captivity at Antioch and showered with honours.

To compensate for this crime and to solidify his position as emperor, Alexios had to scatter money so lavishly as to empty his treasury, and to allow such licence to the officers of the army as to leave the Empire practically defenceless. These actions inevitably led to the financial ruin of the state. At Christmas 1196, Holy Roman Emperor Henry VI attempted to force Alexios to pay him a tribute of 5,000 pounds (later negotiated down to 1,600 pounds) of gold or face invasion. Alexios gathered the money by plundering imperial tombs at the church of the Holy Apostles and heavily taxing the people through the Alamanikon. Because of Henry's death in September 1197, the gold was never dispatched. The Empress Euphrosyne tried in vain to sustain his credit and his court; Vatatzes, the favourite instrument in her attempts at reform, was assassinated by the emperor's orders.

In the east the Empire was overrun by the Seljuk Turks; from the north, the Kingdom of Hungary and the rebellious Bulgarians and Vlachs descended unchecked to ravage the Balkan provinces of the Empire, sometimes penetrating as far as Greece, while Alexios squandered the public treasure on his palaces and gardens and attempted to deal with the crisis through diplomatic means. The Emperor's attempts to bolster the empire's defences by special concessions to pronoiai (notables) in the frontier zone backfired, as the latter increased their regional autonomy. Byzantine authority survived, but in a much weakened state. In 1197, local lord Dobromir Chrysos established himself in the region of Vardar Macedonia, defying the imperial power for several years.

During the first years of Alexios' reign, relations between Byzantium and Serbia were good, since his daughter Eudokia Angelina was married to Serbian Grand Prince Stefan Nemanjić II, who was granted the title of sebastokrator. But in 1200, those relations deteriorated. The marriage between Stefan and Eudokia was dissolved, and the alliance between Serbia and Byzantium ended, leaving Byzantium without a single ally in Southeastern Europe.

== Fourth Crusade ==
Soon, Alexios was threatened by a new and more formidable danger. In 1202, soldiers assembled at Venice to launch the Fourth Crusade. Alexios IV Angelos, the son of the deposed Isaac II, had recently escaped from Constantinople and now appealed for support to the crusaders, promising to end the East–West Schism, to pay for their transport, and to provide military support if they would help him depose his uncle and ascend to his father's throne.

The crusaders, whose objective had been Egypt, were persuaded to set their course for Constantinople, arriving there in June 1203, proclaiming Alexios IV as emperor, and inviting the populace of the capital to depose his uncle. Alexios III took no effective measures to resist, and his attempts to bribe the crusaders failed. His son-in-law, Theodore I Laskaris, who was the only one to attempt anything significant, was defeated at Scutari, and the siege of Constantinople began. Misgovernment by Alexios III had left the Byzantine navy with only 20 worm-eaten hulks by the time the crusaders arrived.

In July, the crusaders, led by the aged Doge Enrico Dandolo, scaled the walls and took control of a major section of the city. In the ensuing fighting, the crusaders set the city on fire, ultimately leaving 20,000 people homeless. On 17 July, Alexios III finally took action and led 17 divisions from the Gate of St. Romanus, vastly outnumbering the crusaders. His courage failed, however, and the Byzantine army returned to the city without a fight. His courtiers demanded action, and Alexios III promised to fight. Instead, that night (17/18 July), Alexios III hid in the palace, and finally, with one of his daughters, Irene, and as much treasure (1,000 pounds of gold) as he could collect, got into a boat and escaped to Develtos in Thrace, leaving his wife and his other daughters behind. Isaac II, drawn from his prison and robed once more in the imperial purple, received his son, Alexios IV, in state.

== Life in exile ==
Alexios III attempted to organize resistance to the new regime from Adrianople and then Mosynopolis, where he was joined by the later usurper Alexios V Doukas in April 1204, after the definitive fall of Constantinople to the crusaders and the establishment of the Latin Empire. At first, Alexios III received Alexios V well, even allowing him to marry his daughter Eudokia Angelina. Later, Alexios V was blinded and deserted by his father-in-law, who fled from the crusaders into Thessaly. Here Alexios III eventually surrendered, with Euphrosyne, to Marquis Boniface of Montferrat, who was establishing himself as ruler of the Kingdom of Thessalonica.

Alexios III attempted to escape Boniface's "protection" in 1205, seeking shelter with Michael I Komnenos Doukas, the ruler of Epirus. Captured by Boniface, Alexios and his retinue were sent to Montferrat before being brought back to Thessalonica in c. 1209. At that point the deposed emperor was ransomed by Michael I, who sent him to Asia Minor, where Alexios' son-in-law Theodore – now emperor of Nicaea – was holding his own against the Latins. Here Alexios conspired against his son-in-law after the latter refused to recognize Alexios' authority, receiving the support of Kaykhusraw I, the sultan of Rûm. In the Battle of Antioch on the Meander in 1211, the sultan was defeated and killed, and Alexios was captured by Theodore. Alexios was then confined to a monastery at Nicaea, where he died later in 1211.

== Family ==
By his marriage to Euphrosyne Doukaina Kamatera, Alexios had three daughters:

- Irene Angelina, who married (1) Andronikos Kontostephanos, and (2) Alexios Palaiologos, by whom she was the grandmother of Emperor Michael VIII Palaiologos.
- Anna Komnene Angelina, who married (1) the sebastokratōr Isaac Komnenos, great-nephew of emperor Manuel I Komnenos, and (2) Theodore I Laskaris, emperor of Nicaea.
- Eudokia Angelina, who married (1) Serbian King Stefan Nemanjić II, then (2) Emperor Alexios V Doukas, and (3) Leo Sgouros, ruler of Corinth.

== See also ==
- List of Byzantine emperors

== Notes ==
Alexios III Angelos Angelid dynasty Born: 1153 Died: 1211
Regnal titles
| Preceded by Isaac II Angelos | Byzantine emperor 1195–1203 | Succeeded by Isaac II Angelos |
| Preceded by Isaac II Angelos | Byzantine emperor 1195–1203 | Succeeded by Alexios IV Angelos |
