= Kecharitomene Monastery =

12th century Byzantine female convent

The Theotokos Kecharitomene Monastery (Greek: Θεοτόκος Κεχαριτωμένη, lit. 'Theotokos Kecharitomene', Mother of God, full of grace) was a female convent built in the early 12th century in the Byzantine capital, Constantinople, by Empress Irene Doukaina. It survived until the 15th century.

The monastery is chiefly known through its extensive charter (typikon), issued by its founder c. 1110 and based on the model of the Theotokos Euergetis Monastery. It was built in the northern part of Constantinople, adjacent to the male monastery of Christ Philanthropos, founded slightly earlier (1107) by Irene. The two were separated by a wall, but served by a common water system.

According to the typikon, the monastery was initially envisaged to house 24 nuns, but the rules allowed the number to be raised to 40. It was cenobitic, with the nuns sleeping in a common dormitory rather than individual cells. The nuns lived in strict seclusion, and no men were allowed to enter the complex apart from the two priests, the steward, and the nuns' confessor, all four of whom were further required to be eunuchs. The only exception was made for the entry of a physician, who was to be either a eunuch or elderly. As an imperial foundation, it was closely associated with the ruling Komnenos dynasty, and Empress Irene built apartments at the monastery for herself and other women of the imperial family. Irene's daughter Anna Komnene was forced to retire there after the death of her husband, Nikephoros Bryennios, and it was here that she wrote the Alexiad.

The monastery is last attested in the 15th century, when the Russian pilgrim Zosima visited it. No known remains survive.

== Sources ==
- Talbot, Alice-Mary (1991). "Kecharitomene Nunnery". In Kazhdan, Alexander (ed.). The Oxford Dictionary of Byzantium. Oxford and New York: Oxford University Press. p. 1118. ISBN 0-19-504652-8.
