= Centre for Byzantine Research =

Organization based in Greece

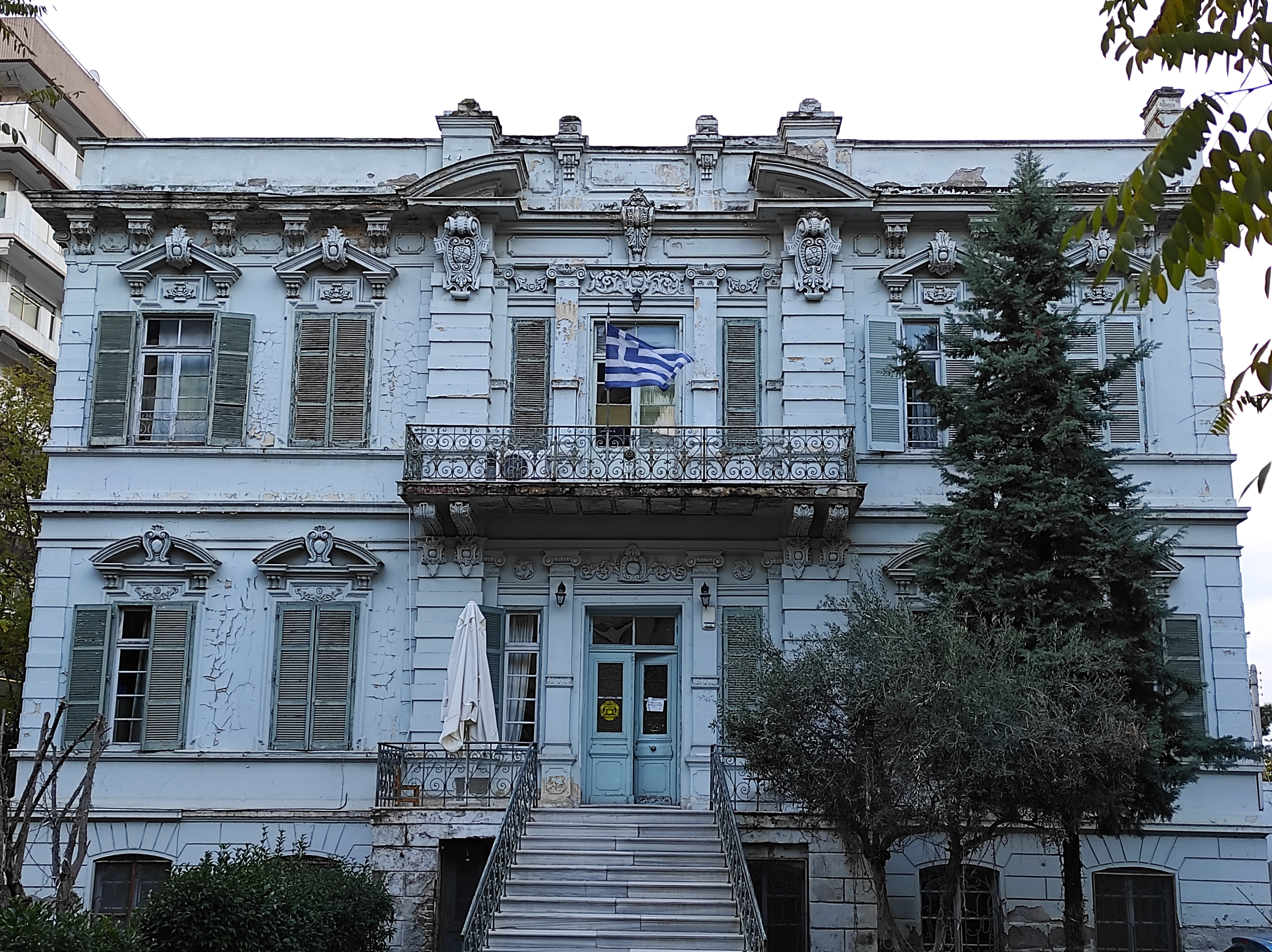
call villa hali bey, 36 Vasilissis Olgas Avenue

The Centre for Byzantine Studies or Centre for Byzantine Research (Greek: Κέντρο Βυζαντινών Ερευνών) is an organization based in Thessaloniki, Greece.

It was founded in 1966 on the initiative of a group of professors from the Faculty of Letters of the Aristotle University of Thessaloniki. The centre is a research organization that promotes the study of Byzantine history, culture and civilization.

It is housed in Villa Melissa (the old orphanage Melissa) on Vasilissis Olgas Avenue.
