= Maria Petraliphaina =

Empress of Thessalonica from 1224 to 1230

- Empress of Thessalonica
- Spouse: Theodore Komnenos Doukas
- Issue: Anna, John, Irene, Demetrios
- House: Petraliphas

Maria Doukaina Komnene Petraliphaina (Greek: Μαρία Δούκαινα Κομνηνή Πετραλίφαινα) was the wife of Theodore Komnenos Doukas, ruler of Epirus and in 1224–1230 self-proclaimed Emperor of Thessalonica. She is the earliest consort of the Epirote state known by name: the two wives of Michael I Komnenos Doukas, predecessor of her husband, were members of the Melissenos family but their first names are unknown.

== Life ==
=== Origin and family ===
Maria was a member of the Petraliphas family, of Italian origin. Her brother John Petraliphas was a ranking noble in the court of the Byzantine emperor Isaac II Angelos (r. 1185–1195, 1203–1204), and was appointed as governor of Thessaly and Macedonia. In 1195, however, he played a leading role in Isaac's ouster and his replacement with Alexios III Angelos (r. 1195–1203). John's daughter Theodora Petraliphaina married Michael II Komnenos Doukas, the illegitimate son of the founder of the Epirote state, Michael I Komnenos Doukas.

=== Marriage ===
She married Theodore Komnenos Doukas sometime during Theodore's stay at the court of the Theodore I Laskaris. Theodore was a son of the sebastokrator John Doukas and of Zoe Doukaina. After the Fourth Crusade captured Constantinople in 1204, he followed Laskaris to Asia Minor, where Laskaris founded the Empire of Nicaea. In c. 1210, Theodore was invited by his half-brother Michael I Komnenos Doukas to Epirus, where Michael had founded an independent Greek principality. Michael wanted Theodore's aid, as his only son, the future Michael II, was underage and illegitimate, while Michael's other half-brothers were considered to lack the ability to rule. According to Konstantinos Varzos, the firstborn child of Maria and Theodore must have been born c. 1206. In the sources, Theodora is never mentioned by her original family name, but always by her husband's surnames as "Doukaina" and "Komnene".

== Issue ==
With Theodore, she had had four children:

1. Anna Angelina Komnene Doukaina, who married King Stefan Radoslav of Serbia
2. John Komnenos Doukas, who became Emperor of Thessalonica in 1237
3. Irene Komnene Doukaina, who married John Asen
4. Demetrios Angelos Doukas, who succeeded as ruler of Thessalonica in 1244

== Sources ==
- Kazhdan, Alexander, ed. (1991). The Oxford Dictionary of Byzantium. Oxford and New York: Oxford University Press. ISBN 0-19-504652-8.
- Polemis, Demetrios I. (1968). The Doukai: A Contribution to Byzantine Prosopography. London: The Athlone Press.
- Varzos, Konstantinos (1984). Η Γενεαλογία των Κομνηνών [The Genealogy of the Komnenoi] (PDF) (in Greek). Vol. B. Thessaloniki: Centre for Byzantine Studies, University of Thessaloniki.
