= John Plytos =

John Plytos (Greek: Ἰωάννης Πλύτος) was a senior official and provincial governor of the Despotate of Epirus and the Empire of Thessalonica under Theodore Komnenos Doukas.

The sebastos John Plytos served as governor (doux) of Krujë (where his friend, Gregory Kamonas, had ruled in c. 1215), of Ohrid, and of Veroia. He was later raised to the rank of panhypersebastos and appointed as mesazon (chief minister) of Theodore Komnenos Doukas.

== Sources ==
- Nicol, Donald MacGillivray (1976). "Refugees, Mixed Population and Local Patriotism in Epiros and Western Macedonia after the Fourth Crusade". XVe Congrès international d'études byzantines (Athènes, 1976), Rapports et corapports I. Athens. pp. 3–33.
