= Michael II Komnenos Doukas =

- Michael II (left), as depicted on a trachy of John III.

Despot of Epirus
- Reign: 1230–1266/68
- Predecessor: Theodore
- Successor: Nikephoros I (in Epirus); John I Doukas (in Thessaly)
- Died: 1266/68
- Spouse: Theodora of Arta
- Issue: Nikephoros I Komnenos Doukas; John Doukas (son of Michael II); Demetrios Doukas Komnenos Koutroules; Helena Angelina Doukaina; Anna Komnene Doukaina; John I Doukas (illeg.)
- Dynasty: Komnenos Doukas
- Father: Michael I

Michael II Komnenos Doukas, Latinized as Comnenus Ducas (Greek: Μιχαήλ Β΄ Κομνηνός Δούκας, Mikhaēl II Komnēnos Doukas), often called Michael Angelos in narrative sources, was from 1230 until his death in 1266/68 the ruler of the Despotate of Epirus, which included Epirus in northwestern Greece, the western part of Greek Macedonia and Thessaly, and western Greece as far south as Nafpaktos.

== Life ==
Michael was an illegitimate son of Michael I Komnenos Doukas, the founder of the state of Epirus. The historian Demetrios Polemis estimates that he was born in the early years of his father's reign (1205–15), probably in ca. 1206. Like most members of his family, originally descended from the Angelos family, he preferred the surname "Doukas", or the variant "Komnenos Doukas" (Κομνηνός ὁ Δούκας), but is also referred to by contemporary Byzantine historians as "Angelos".

After his father's murder in 1215 and the succession of his uncle Theodore Komnenos Doukas, he went into exile. According to the hagiography of his later wife, St. Theodora of Arta, Theodore sent him and his mother to exile in the Peloponnese. After Theodore's defeat and capture by Ivan Asen II of Bulgaria at the Battle of Klokotnitsa, the throne in Thessalonica was now occupied by Theodore's brother Manuel Komnenos Doukas, who managed to escape from Klokotnitsa. His domain was reduced to the environs of the city, and his family's core territories in Epirus and Thessaly, as well as Dyrrhachium and Corfu, while his brother Constantine Komnenos Doukas in Aetolia and Acarnania recognized his suzerainty. As a son-in-law of Ivan Asen, Manuel was allowed to maintain internal autonomy, but to all intents and purposes he was a client of the Bulgarian tsar. Michael seized the opportunity and returned to Epirus. Michael quickly succeeded, apparently with the support of the local population, in taking over control of the country. Manuel was forced to recognize the fait accompli under the pretence that Michael recognized his suzerainty, in token of which Manuel conferred him the title of Despot. In reality Michael was fully independent, and very quickly ceased to acknowledge Manuel's suzerainty; by 1236, he had seized Corfu. Michael II secured the support of local notables by marrying Theodora Petraliphaina, and established a close relationship with the Empire of Nicaea. In 1238, Michael was visited by the Nicaean Patriarch Germanus II and in 1249 he received the court dignity of despotes from Emperor John III Doukas Vatatzes.

In 1237 Theodore was released by Ivan Asen, who married his daughter, Irene. Theodore returned to Thessalonica, where he easily deposed his brother Manuel and installed his son John Komnenos Doukas as emperor (without a coronation ceremony), but remained the real ruler of the empire in his son's name. The deposed Manuel was sent to exile, but in 1239 he returned with Nicaean aid in an attempt to take back Thessalonica. In the event, an agreement to partition the family possessions was reached: Theodore and John remained in control of Thessalonica, while Manuel received Thessaly. Michael in Epirus was not part of his uncles' agreement, and continued to pursue his own policies independently. In this context he sent an embassy to Emperor Frederick II Hohenstaufen in December 1239, presumably to secure his assistance against his uncles. In 1241 Manuel died, Michael moved in quickly to occupy Thessaly before either of his remaining uncles could react. Michael II's relations with Nicaea ensured his neutrality during the conflict in which John III Doukas Vatatzes conquered Thessalonica and penetrated into northern Greece in 1244–46.

In autumn 1246, John III Doukas Vatatzes exploited the accession of the underage Michael Asen (r. 1246–57) to the Bulgarian throne to attack Bulgaria. Within three months, he captured most of Thrace and all of eastern and northern Macedonia. Michael II also took advantage of the opportunity to expand into Albania and northwestern Macedonia. At the close of this campaign, Vatatzes turned on Thessalonica, which he captured with the help of conspirators inside the city. Demetrios Angelos Doukas, who had ruled the city after his elder brother John's death in 1244, was captured and exiled to Bithynia, while Thessalonica and all of Macedonia were placed under the governance of the Grand Domestic Andronikos Palaiologos.

With Thessalonica secured, Vatatzes turned to Epirus, offering Michael II a marriage alliance between Michael's eldest son Nikephoros and his own granddaughter Maria. The offer was enthusiastically accepted by Michael's wife, Theodora Petraliphaina, who took Nikephoros with her and went to meet Vatatzes at Pegae. There the young couple was engaged, and a marriage was arranged for the next year, before Theodora and Nikephoros returned to Arta. While his wife supported a close alliance with Nicaea, Michael himself remained ambivalent, as he had not abandoned his family's ambitions. The pro-Nicaean historians consider this stance an indication of his inherent untrustworthiness, but a major factor was the influence of his uncle, Theodore, who remained safely ensconced in his stronghold of Vodena. With his sons out of the picture, Theodore turned to the sole surviving member of his family who could claim Thessalonica and thwart Nicaea's plans, especially as Vatatzes, with no threats on his other borders, was mobilizing to capture Constantinople. Together, Michael and his uncle planned and launched a sudden attack on Thessalonica in spring 1251. The city resisted successfully, and in spring of the next year Vatatzes once more crossed into Europe. Michael and Theodore had turned to the north, capturing Prilep and Veles, and when they received news of Vatatzes' arrival, they withdrew to Epirus via Kastoria. Vatatzes besieged and captured Vodena and took Kastoria and Deabolis in winter 1252/53, but soon became bogged down in skirmishing in the area of Kastoria. The stalemate was broken when two Epirote generals, John Glabas and Michael's brother-in-law Theodore Petraliphas, defected to the Nicaeans, followed shortly after by the ruler of Kruja, Golem. This forced Michael to come to terms with Vatatzes, sending the Metropolitan of Naupaktos John Xeros, his brother-in-law Constantine Maliasenos, and a certain Lambetes. The treaty, concluded at Larissa, stipulated that Michael would cede not only the fortresses he had recently captured but all his remaining holdings in Macedonia, while Kruja would come under Vatatzes' suzerainty. Michael received the title of Despot anew from Vatatzes and the marriage alliance was reconfirmed, but Nikephoros was taken to Nicaea as a hostage for his father's behaviour. Furthermore, Vatatzes explicitly demanded the handing over of Theodore. While the Nikephoros received the title of Despot and soon allowed to return to Epirus, Theodore was moved as a prisoner to Asia Minor where he died shortly after, in ca. 1253.

When he was forced to surrender Dyrrhachium and Servia to the Nicaeans in 1256, Michael determined again to expand his state at Nicaea's expense. However, while he was advancing towards Thessalonica, King Manfred of Sicily seized Dyrrhachium and its environs. Resolved to take Thessalonica, Michael came to terms with Manfred and sent him his daughter as wife, ceding the lost towns and the island of Corfu as dowry. He also concluded an alliance with Prince William II Villehardouin of Achaea.

The troops of the three allies overran the Nicaean possessions in Macedonia and in 1259 prepared to fight the Nicaean army led by John Palaiologos, a brother of Emperor Michael VIII Palaiologos, on the plain of Pelagonia. Nevertheless, the allied operation was compromised by mutual suspicion and Michael's illegitimate son John Doukas deserted to the enemy, while Michael himself abandoned his allies. The Nicaeans inflicted a crushing defeat on Prince William of Achaea, who was captured in the battle. While Michael fled to the Ionian Islands, the Nicaeans occupied Epirus but they were faced with so much resistance that they were forced to withdraw. Michael recovered his domains with further help from Manfred. After further warfare another Byzantine victory in 1264 forced him to accept the nominal suzerainty of Michael VIII Palaiologos and to strengthen the bond by dynastic marriages. When Michael II died in or shortly before 1268, his domains were split between his sons Nikephoros I Komnenos Doukas of Epirus and John I Doukas of Thessaly.

== Family ==
By his marriage to Theodora Petraliphaina (St. Theodora of Arta), Michael II had several children, including:

- Nikephoros I Komnenos Doukas, who succeeded as ruler of Epirus
- John Doukas, hostage to Constantinople
- Demetrios (renamed Michael) Doukas Komnenos, surnamed Koutroules
- Helena Angelina Doukaina, who married King Manfred of Sicily
- Anna Komnene Doukaina, who married Prince William II Villehardouin of Achaea and after his death Nicholas II of St Omer, lord of Thebes.

By a mistress, possibly the unnamed lady of the Gangrenos family recorded in Theodora's hagiography, Michael II had at least two other sons:

- John I Doukas, who succeeded as ruler of Thessaly and appears to have been the eldest of his children
- Theodore Doukas

== Sources ==
- Fine, John V. A. (1994) [1987]. The Late Medieval Balkans: A Critical Survey from the Late Twelfth Century to the Ottoman Conquest. Ann Arbor, Michigan: University of Michigan Press. ISBN 978-0-472-10079-8.
- Geanakoplos, Deno John (1959). Emperor Michael Palaeologus and the West, 1258–1282: A Study in Byzantine-Latin Relations. Cambridge, Massachusetts: Harvard University Press.
- Kazhdan, Alexander, ed. (1991). The Oxford Dictionary of Byzantium. Oxford and New York: Oxford University Press. ISBN 0-19-504652-8.
- Polemis, Demetrios I. (1968). The Doukai: A Contribution to Byzantine Prosopography. London: The Athlone Press.
- Trapp, Erich; Beyer, Hans-Veit; Walther, Rainer; Sturm-Schnabl, Katja; Kislinger, Ewald; Leontiadis, Ioannis; Kaplaneres, Sokrates (1976–1996). Prosopographisches Lexikon der Palaiologenzeit (in German). Vienna: Verlag der Österreichischen Akademie der Wissenschaften. ISBN 3-7001-3003-1.
- Varzos, Konstantinos (1984). Η Γενεαλογία των Κομνηνών [The Genealogy of the Komnenoi] (PDF) (in Greek). Vol. B. Thessaloniki: Centre for Byzantine Studies, University of Thessaloniki.

Preceded by Theodore Komnenos Doukas as Emperor of Thessalonica	Despot of Epirus ca. 1230–1268	Succeeded by Nikephoros I Komnenos Doukas
Preceded by Manuel Komnenos Doukas	Ruler of Thessaly; 1241–1268	Succeeded by John I Doukas
