= Anna Angelina Komnene Doukaina =

Anna

Queen consort of Serbia
- Spouse: Stefan Radoslav
- Issue: At least one child
- Father: Theodore Komnenos Doukas
- Mother: Maria Petraliphaina

Anna Angelina Komnene Doukaina (Greek: Ἄννα Ἀγγελίνα Κομνηνή Δούκαινα, Serbian Cyrillic: Ана Анђелина Комнина Дукина) was a daughter of Theodore Komnenos Doukas and Maria Petraliphaina. Anna was Queen consort of Serbia as wife of King Stefan Radoslav.

In 1216, Radoslav's father attempted to organize a marriage between his son and Theodora, daughter of Theodore's half-brother Michael I Komnenos Doukas. However, the Church prohibited this marriage because it would have been between cousins of the seventh degree. Instead, Radoslav married Anna shortly after.

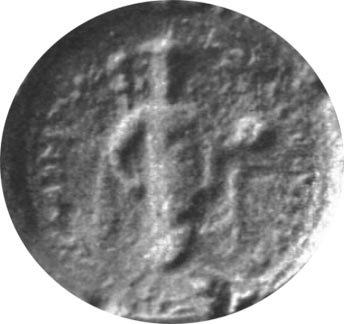
Seal of Anna's husband, the King of Serbia

She was disliked by the Church and the nobility, and considered a corrupting influence on Radoslav – who was already too Greek-influenced in their eyes, as he unconditionally allied himself with Epirus and identified with his mother's Greek dynasty as much as with the Nemanjić.

Theodore Doukas Komnenos Angelos was defeated and captured in the Battle of Klokotnitsa with Bulgaria in the spring of 1230. Dissent among the Serbian nobility grew as Radoslav's inflexible pro-Greek orientation now became a problem. Thus, a coalition of Serbian aristocrats led by Radoslav's brother Stefan Vladislav ousted him in early 1234.

Radoslav and Anna first went to Ragusa and attempted to organize a counter-coup against Vladislav, but achieved little. Later, the monk Theodosius would claim Radoslav and Anna went to Dyrrhachium instead and separated there, but this claim has been proven to be false.

After some time, they returned to Serbia with the help of Archbishop Sava and took monastic vows. Radoslav's monastic name was Jovan.
