= Klokotnitsa, Haskovo Province =

Klokotnitsa Клокотница
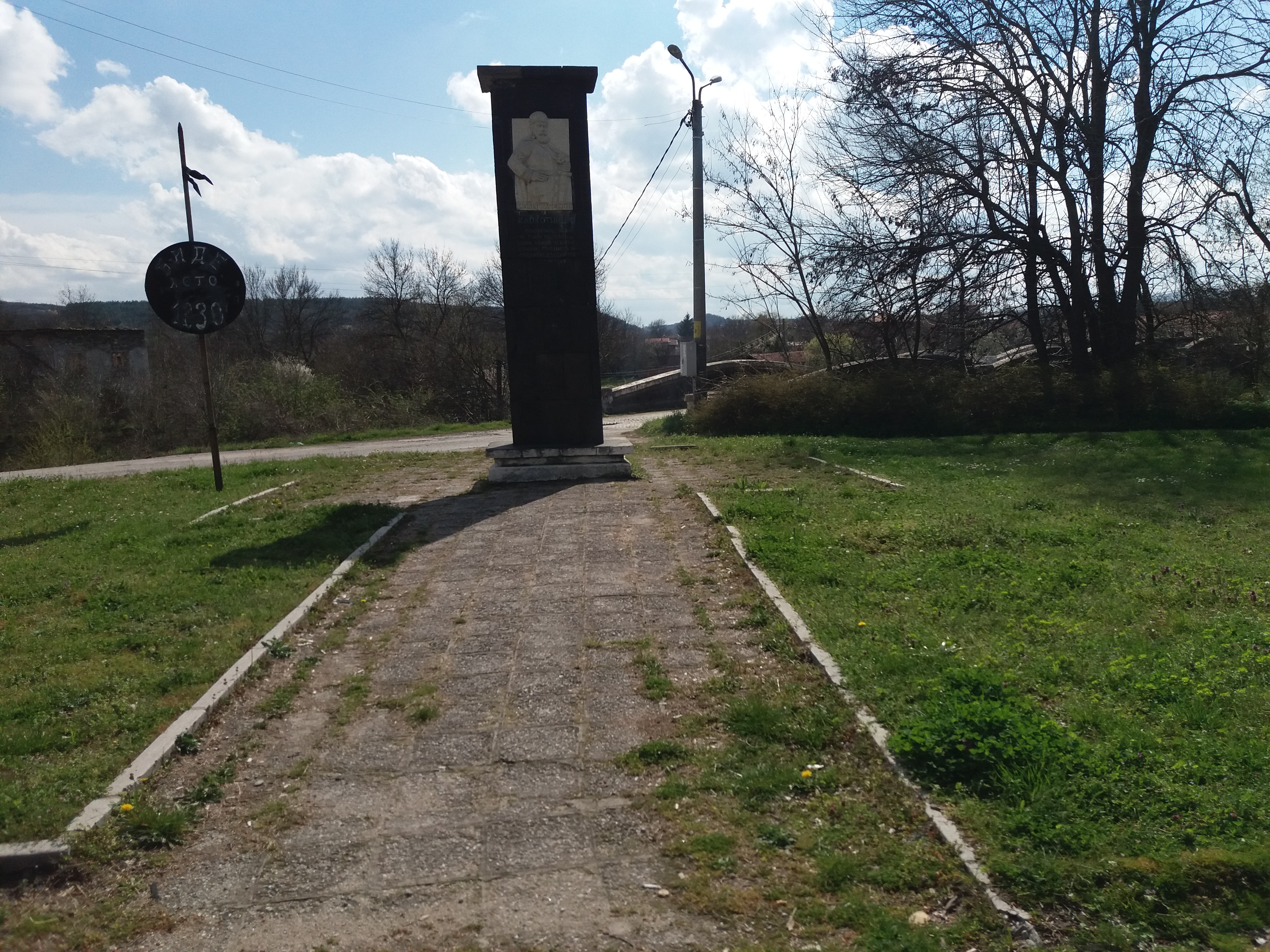

- Location of Klokotnitsa in Bulgaria
- Coordinates: 41°59′N 25°30′E
- Country: Bulgaria
- Province (Oblast): Haskovo

Area
  - Total: 16.678 km^{2} (6.439 sq mi)
- Elevation: 146 m (479 ft)

Population (2011)
  - Total: 472
- Time zone: UTC+2 (EET)
  - Summer (DST): UTC+3 (EEST)
- Postal Code: 6310
- Area code: 03727

Klokotnitsa (Bulgarian: Клокотница) is a village in southern Bulgaria in the Haskovo Municipality. It has a population of 619 people (as of June, 2005).

The village is famous for the great battle on 9 March 1230 between the Bulgarian tsar Ivan Asen II and the Byzantine Greek ruler Theodore Komnenos Doukas. After the battle, Bulgaria became for a time the largest power in the Balkan peninsula, stretching between the Black Sea, the Aegean Sea and the Adriatic Sea.

To mark the victory, Tsar Ivan Asen II built the SS. Forty Martyrs Church in Veliko Tarnovo and put a stone column in it.

A small relief by the E-80 international road commemorates the battle.

This village once belonged to the Hasköylü Ağalık (Agaluk of Haskovo).

== Honours ==
Klokotnitsa Ridge on Trinity Peninsula, Antarctica is named after the village.
