= Constantine Komnenos Doukas =

Byzantine noble and governor

Constantine
- Despot, ruler of Acarnania & Aetolia
- Born: c. 1172
- Died: c. 1242
- Noble family: Komnenodoukas branch of the Angelos family
- Father: John
- Mother: Zoe Doukaina
- Occupation: Military commander

Constantine Komnenos Doukas (Greek: Κωνσταντίνος Κομνηνός Δούκας, romanized: Kōnstantinos Komnēnos Doukas; c. 1172 – after 1242), usually named simply Constantine Doukas, was a son of the sebastokrator John Doukas and brother of the founders of the Despotate of Epirus, Michael and Theodore. He was named governor of Acarnania and Aetolia and given the rank of Despot, which he held until his death.

== Life ==
Little is known about his life. He was born c. 1172, the elder son of John Doukas by his second wife Zoe Doukaina. He may be identical to the Constantine Doukas who on 12 April 1204, on the eve of Constantinople's fall to the Fourth Crusade, competed with Constantine Laskaris for the imperial crown. Around 1208, he accompanied the deposed Byzantine emperor Alexios III Angelos, who had sought refuge in the Epirote court, to the Sultanate of Rum. From there, with Turkish support, Alexios unsuccessfully tried to take over the Empire of Nicaea.

=== Ruler of Aetolia and Acarnania ===
Returning to Epirus, Constantine was named governor of Acarnania and Aetolia, with Naupaktos as his capital, probably after Theodore Komnenos Doukas's succession as ruler of Epirus in 1215. In 1216, he accompanied his brother Theodore in a campaign against Bulgaria. Constantine's rule was successful, as he recovered Neopatras and Lamia from their Latin rulers, but was marred by his clash with the assertive bishop of Naupaktos, John Apokaukos, who protested his authoritarian rule and extortionate tax demands from the populace. The dispute led to the forcible deposition and exile of Apokaukos in 1220, and was resolved only in May 1221 after a synod including representatives from most of the senior sees in Greece and the Epirote domains. Indeed, the relations between Constantine and Apokaukos became cordial thereafter, and the bishop even composed an encomium in his honour.

About 1225, when Theodore was proclaimed emperor at Thessalonica, Constantine and his other surviving brother, Manuel, received the next highest title of Despot. His activities thereafter are obscure: he probably did not participate in the disastrous Battle of Klokotnitsa in 1230, where Theodore was captured by the Bulgarians. He remained ruler of Aetolia and Acarnania, owing only a loose allegiance to his brother Manuel, now emperor at Thessalonica. In 1237 he supported the return of Theodore, released from Bulgarian captivity, to power at Thessalonica. Constantine is last mentioned in 1242, and may have died shortly after.

== Family ==
It is unknown whether he married or if he had any children.

== Sources ==
- Polemis, Demetrios I. (1968). The Doukai: A Contribution to Byzantine Prosopography. London, United Kingdom: The Athlone Press.
- Varzos, Konstantinos (1984). Η Γενεαλογία των Κομνηνών [The Genealogy of the Komnenoi] (PDF) (in Greek). Vol. B. Thessaloniki: Centre for Byzantine Studies, University of Thessaloniki. pp. 656–664.
