= Demetrios Angelos Doukas =

Demetrios
- Despot in Thessalonica
- Reign: 1244–1246
- Predecessor: John Komnenos Doukas
- Successor: Empire of Nicea
- Born: c. 1220
- Died: after 1246
Names
- Demetrios Angelos Doukas
- Dynasty: Komnenodoukai
- Father: Theodore Komnenos Doukas
- Mother: Maria Petraliphaina

Demetrios Angelos Doukas (Greek: Δημήτριος Ἀγγελοδούκας), was ruler of Thessalonica with the title of Despot as a vassal of the Empire of Nicaea from 1244 until his deposition in 1246.

== Origin ==
Born c. 1220, Demetrios was the younger son of Theodore Komnenos Doukas and Maria Petraliphaina. As such he was a great-great-grandson of the Byzantine emperor Alexios I Komnenos (r. 1081–1118) and Empress Irene Doukaina, and first cousin once removed of the emperors Isaac II Angelos (r. 1185–1195, 1203–1204) and Alexios III Angelos (r. 1195–1203), sharing descent from Constantine Angelos, the founder of the Angelos lineage. Unlike his father and most of his relatives, who eschewed the surname of "Angelos" due to the disastrous reigns of the Angelid emperors, and preferred to use the more prestigious surnames of "Doukas" or "Komnenos", Demetrios used the name "Angelos Doukas" (Ἀγγελοδούκας) in a manuscript notice dated 25 September 1244.

== Background ==
His father Theodore ruled over the Byzantine successor state of Epirus since 1215, and after the conquest of the Latin Kingdom of Thessalonica in 1224, had founded the Empire of Thessalonica, in rivalry with the other major Byzantine successor state, the Empire of Nicaea in western Asia Minor. By 1230, he seemed poised to recover Constantinople from the Latin Empire and thus restore the Byzantine Empire, but in that year he was defeated and captured at the Battle of Klokotnitsa by Ivan Asen II of Bulgaria, and was blinded after being implicated in a plot against Ivan Asen. In the aftermath of Klokotnitsa, Theodore's empire collapsed: within a few months most of Thrace, Macedonia, and Albania, fell under Bulgarian rule. Theodore's brother Manuel, who managed to escape from Klokotnitsa, now took over the throne in Thessalonica, ruling over a much-reduced domain as a vassal of the Bulgarian ruler. When his sister Irene married Ivan Asen in 1237, Theodore was released from captivity. Theodore made his way back to Thessalonica and overthrew Manuel, but as he was blind, he installed his oldest son John as emperor. In 1244, however, the Nicaean emperor John III Doukas Vatatzes campaigned against Thessalonica, and forced John to recognize his suzerainty and renounce his imperial title, receiving the title of Despot instead.

== Rule of Thessalonica ==
Theodore himself retired to Vodena, from where he supervised the affairs of state. On John's death in 1244 Demetrios succeeded his brother as ruler of Thessalonica (sometime before 25 September 1244). An embassy was to Nicaea to announce the succession, as befitted the terms of vassalage agreed in 1242, and Vatatzes confirmed the succession and awarded the title of Despot to Demetrios.

Young and dissolute, Demetrios inspired little loyalty among the leading families of Thessalonica, who began plotting against him and viewing a takeover by Nicaea as a preferable alternative—particularly as by this time Nicaea had clearly emerged as the most powerful and credible of the Byzantine successor states.

The Nicaean position improved further in 1246, when Vatatzes once more campaigned in Europe. In a three-month campaign he wrested much of Thrace as well as most of Macedonia from Bulgaria, which now became his vassal. At Melenikon, Vatatzes was met by an envoy of the Thessalonian conspirators, who promised to overthrow Demetrios and deliver the city to him, in exchange for a guarantee of their privileges, conditions that Vatatzes readily granted. Vatatzes then called upon Demetrios to come before him and demonstrate his loyalty and submission, but the latter refused; Demetrios had become suspicious of some of the conspirators, but they were able to dispel his concerns.

When Vatatzes appeared before the city, Demetrios again refused to come out and pay homage to his suzerain, but a few days later Nicaean supporters inside the city opened a gate and let the Nicaean army in. In terror, Demetrios fled to the citadel, but was persuaded to yield by his sister Irene, who had presented herself before Vatatzes and secured clemency for her brother. Thessalonica was incorporated into the Nicaean state, with Andronikos Palaiologos as its governor. Demetrios was sent into exile to the fortress of Lentiana in Bithynia, where he probably died at an unknown date. His father Theodore, isolated and without power in his refuge at Vodena, apparently remained uninvolved in these events.

== Sources ==
- Ferjančić, Bozidar (1960). Деспоти у Византији и Јужнословенским земљама [Despots in Byzantium and the South Slavic Lands] (in Serbian). Belgrade: Српска академија наука.
- Fine, John V. A. (1994) [1987]. The Late Medieval Balkans: A Critical Survey from the Late Twelfth Century to the Ottoman Conquest. Ann Arbor, Michigan: University of Michigan Press. ISBN 978-0-472-10079-8.
- Kazhdan, Alexander, ed. (1991). The Oxford Dictionary of Byzantium. Oxford and New York: Oxford University Press. ISBN 0-19-504652-8.
- Loenertz, Raymond-Joseph (1973). "Aux origines du despotat d'Épire et de la principauté d'Achaïe" [On the origins of the Despotate of Epirus and the Principality of Achaea]. Byzantion (in French). 43: 360–394.
- Polemis, Demetrios I. (1968). The Doukai: A Contribution to Byzantine Prosopography. London: The Athlone Press.
- Varzos, Konstantinos (1984). Η Γενεαλογία των Κομνηνών [The Genealogy of the Komnenoi] (PDF) (in Greek). Vol. B. Thessaloniki: Centre for Byzantine Studies, University of Thessaloniki.

Regnal titles
Preceded by John Komnenos Doukas	Despot in Thessalonica; 1244–1246	Conquest by the Empire of Nicaea
