= John Doukas (son of Michael II) =

- general
- Born: 13th c.
- Died: 13th c.
- Noble family: House of Angelos
- Spouse: Tornikina Komnene
- Issue: Helena
- Father: Michael II Komnenos Doukas
- Mother: Theodora Petraliphaina

John Doukas (Greek: Ἰωάννης Δούκας, Iōannēs Doúkas) was a son of the Despot of Epirus, Michael II Komnenos Doukas, and a general in Byzantine service.

John was the second-born son of the Despot of Epirus, Michael II Komnenos Doukas, and Theodora Petraliphaina. In 1261 his mother brought him as a hostage to the Byzantine court at Constantinople, where he married Tornikina Komnene (of unknown first name), the second-born daughter of the sebastokrator Constantine Tornikios. The couple had at least one daughter, Helena, but the marriage was unhappy, with John apparently despising his wife. As a result, he was imprisoned and blinded in 1280, and committed suicide shortly after.

== Sources ==
- Polemis, Demetrios I. (1968). The Doukai: A Contribution to Byzantine Prosopography. London: The Athlone Press.
- Trapp, Erich; Beyer, Hans-Veit; Walther, Rainer; Sturm-Schnabl, Katja; Kislinger, Ewald; Leontiadis, Ioannis; Kaplaneres, Sokrates (1976–1996). Prosopographisches Lexikon der Palaiologenzeit (in German). Vienna: Verlag der Österreichischen Akademie der Wissenschaften. ISBN 3-7001-3003-1.
