= Theodore Komnenos Doukas =

Emperor of Thessalonica from 1224 to 1230

- Emperor and Autocrat of the Romans
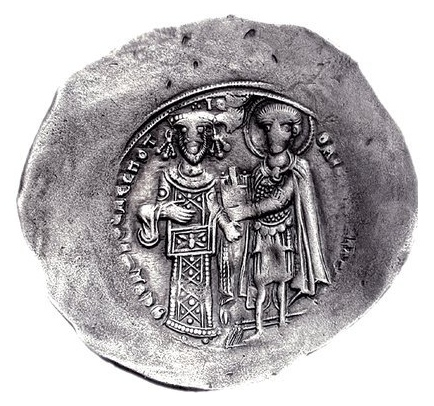
- Electrum coin with Theodore (left) blessed by Thessalonica's patron, St. Demetrius

Emperor of Thessalonica Claimant Byzantine Emperor
- Reign: 1224–1230
- Predecessor: Demetrius (as king)
- Successor: Manuel Komnenos Doukas

Ruler of Epirus
- Reign: 1215–1230
- Predecessor: Michael I Komnenos Doukas
- Successor: Michael II Komnenos Doukas
- Died: c. 1253
- Spouse: Maria Petraliphaina
- Issue: Anna Angelina Komnene Doukaina; John Komnenos Doukas; Irene Komnene Doukaina; Demetrios Angelos Doukas
- Dynasty: Komnenodoukas branch of the Angelos dynasty
- Father: John Doukas
- Mother: Zoe Doukaina

Theodore Komnenos Doukas (Greek: Θεόδωρος Κομνηνὸς Δούκας, Theodōros Komnēnos Doukas; Latinized as Theodore Comnenus Ducas; died c. 1253) or Theodore Angelos Komnenos was the ruler of Epirus and Thessaly from 1215 to 1230 and of Thessalonica and most of Macedonia and western Thrace from 1224 to 1230. He was also the power behind the rule of his sons John and Demetrios over Thessalonica in 1237–1246.

Theodore was the scion of a distinguished Byzantine aristocratic family related to the imperial Komnenos, Doukas, and Angelos dynasties. Nevertheless, nothing is known about Theodore's life before the conquest of Constantinople and dissolution of the Byzantine Empire by the Fourth Crusade in 1204. Following the fall of Constantinople, he served Theodore I Laskaris, founder of the Empire of Nicaea, for a few years before being called to Epirus, where his half-brother Michael I Komnenos Doukas had founded an independent principality. When Michael died in 1215, Theodore sidelined his brother's underage and illegitimate son Michael II and assumed the governance of the Epirote state. Theodore continued his brother's policy of territorial expansion. Allied with Serbia, he expanded into Macedonia, threatening the Latin Kingdom of Thessalonica. The capture of the Latin Emperor Peter II of Courtenay in 1217 opened the way to the gradual envelopment of Thessalonica, culminating in the city's fall in 1224.

As ruler of Thessalonica, Theodore quickly declared himself emperor, challenging the Nicaean emperor John III Doukas Vatatzes's claims to the Byzantine imperial throne. In 1225, he advanced to the outskirts of Constantinople, but his final attack against the seat of the much-reduced Latin Empire was delayed until 1230. In that year, Theodore amassed an army to besiege Constantinople, but then diverted it against Bulgaria, an ambivalent ally which threatened his northern flank. Theodore was defeated and captured at the Battle of Klokotnitsa, and spent the next seven years in captivity. In the meantime, he was succeeded by his brother Manuel. Manuel quickly lost Thrace, most of Macedonia, and Albania to the Bulgarian Emperor John Asen II. Thessalonica itself became a Bulgarian vassal, while in Epirus proper power was seized by Michael II, returning from exile.

Theodore was released in 1237 when his daughter Irene married John Asen II, and quickly managed to regain control of Thessalonica, ousting Manuel. Having been blinded during his captivity and thus disqualified from occupying the throne again, he installed his eldest son John as emperor, but remained the de facto regent of the state. Manuel tried to regain Thessalonica with Nicaean support, but a negotiated settlement was reached which gave him Thessaly and left Thessalonica and its environs to Theodore and John. In 1241, John III Vatatzes invited Theodore to visit Nicaea. He was welcomed and treated with great honour, but was effectively detained there until the spring of next year, when Vatatzes marched on Thessalonica with Theodore in tow. Theodore was sent in to negotiate with his son and convince him to accept demotion to the rank of Despot and to recognize the suzerainty of Nicaea. John died in 1244 and was succeeded by Theodore's younger son Demetrios. In 1246, Vatatzes overthrew the unpopular Demetrios and annexed Thessalonica. Theodore influenced his nephew Michael II to launch an attack on Thessalonica in 1251, but in 1252, Vatatzes campaigned against them and forced Michael to come to terms. Theodore was taken prisoner and sent into exile in Nicaea, where he died around 1253.

== Early life and career ==
Born between 1180 and 1185, Theodore was a son of the sebastokrator John Doukas and of Zoe Doukaina. His paternal grandparents were Constantine Angelos and Theodora, a daughter of the Byzantine emperor Alexios I Komnenos (r. 1081–1118). Theodore's uncle, Andronikos, was the father of the emperors Isaac II Angelos (r. 1185–1195, 1203–1204) and Alexios III Angelos (r. 1195–1203), who were Theodore's first cousins. As with most members of his family, he preferred to use the surname of "Doukas" or "Komnenos Doukas" (Κομνηνὸς ὁ Δούκας); contemporaries variously called him "Doukas", "Komnenos", or even "Grand Komnenos" (μέγας Κομνηνός), an appellation more usually found among the ruling family of the Empire of Trebizond. Theodore evidently preferred to be associated with the more successful dynasties of the Doukai and the Komnenoi, rather than the disastrous reign of the Angeloi; indeed the only medieval writers to call him "Angelos" were the later, hostile pro-Palaiologos historians Nikephoros Gregoras and Theodore Skoutariotes, while George Akropolites refers to him as "Komnenos" until his defeat at Klokotnitsa in 1230 and as "Angelos" after.

Theodore's early life is obscure. After the Fourth Crusade captured Constantinople in 1204, he followed Theodore Laskaris to Asia Minor, where Laskaris founded the Empire of Nicaea. Theodore's service under Laskaris is relatively unknown except for a brief reference in a letter written by the Metropolitan of Corfu, George Bardanes, one of Theodore's apologists. Bardanes writes that Theodore "took many dangers for his sake and wrested many fortresses from the enemies and subdued them to Laskaris' rule", distinguishing himself through his valour and receiving many rewards from the Nicaean ruler. Some modern scholars, such as Karl Hopf and Antoine Bon, have identified a certain Theodore, who appears as "lord of Argos" and was the successor of Leo Sgouros in leading the resistance against the Crusaders in the northwestern Peloponnese after Sgouros' death in 1208, with Theodore Komnenos Doukas. This view has been questioned by Raymond-Joseph Loenertz, who argues that there is no evidence for such an assumption, and that conversely it is well established that Theodore was in Nicaean service at the time.

Around 1210, Theodore was invited by his half-brother Michael I Komnenos Doukas to Epirus, where Michael had founded an independent Greek principality. Michael wanted Theodore's aid, as his only son, the future Michael II Komnenos Doukas, was underage and illegitimate, while Michael's other half-brothers were considered to lack the ability to rule. Laskaris allowed Theodore to leave, but bound him with an oath of allegiance to himself and his heirs. Before going to Epirus, Theodore had married Maria Petraliphaina, with whom he had four children.

== Ruler of Epirus ==
Expansion of the Epirote state during the reigns of Michael I and Theodore Komnenos Doukas

From 1210 on, Michael I Komnenos Doukas was engaged in territorial expansion, chiefly at the expense of the Latin Kingdom of Thessalonica to his east; after initial reverses, much of Thessaly was conquered. By 1214, Dyrrhachium and Corfu had been recovered from the Latins as well. The traditional view of historians is that these events marked Michael I's repudiation of the allegiance he had sworn to the Latin Empire, but historian Filip Van Tricht argues that both Michael and later Theodore remained, at least in theory, vassals of the Latin Empire until 1217. Michael was assassinated by a servant in late 1214 or in 1215. As Michael II was illegitimate and too young, Theodore had no trouble in sidelining the boy. According to the hagiography of St. Theodora of Arta, the boy and his mother spent the duration of Theodore's reign exiled in the Peloponnese.

=== Relations with Serbia and Nicaea ===
Theodore was capable and extremely ambitious. Notwithstanding his oath to Laskaris, he aspired not only to expand his state at the expense of Thessalonica, but to eventually recover Constantinople and revive the Byzantine Empire with himself as its ruler. To secure his northern flank, Theodore allied himself with Serbia and the Albanian clans. The Principality of Arbanon had already come in the Epirote political orbit under Michael I, and closer ties developed when its ruler, Demetrios, died in 1215, leaving his principality to his widow, who promptly remarried the next year to a Greek magnate, Gregory Kamonas. Against the Serbs, Theodore abandoned Michael I's attempt to pursue a northward expansion into Zeta, and instead pursued an alliance with the Serbian prince Stefan II Nemanjić (r. 1196–1228) that was directed towards keeping the Bulgarians in check. The ties between Epirus and Serbia were solidified by the marriage of Theodore's brother Manuel Komnenos Doukas to one of Stefan II's sisters c. 1216. Stefan II then sought to wed one of his sons—in all likelihood his eldest son and heir, Stefan Radoslav—to Michael I's second daughter Theodora. The Archbishop of Ohrid, Demetrios Chomatianos, refused to sanction the marriage due to consanguinity—Theodora was a second cousin of Stefan Radoslav's mother, Eudokia Angelina, a daughter of Alexios III Angelos. In 1217, Stefan II tried to circumvent this by suggesting himself as the groom to Theodora's half-sister Maria, but Chomatianos vetoed this proposal as well on similar grounds. Finally, Stefan Radoslav married Theodore's firstborn daughter Anna in winter 1219/20.

With his position thus strengthened, Theodore expanded his territory into northern Macedonia, although it is possible that at least part of this region had already been captured by Michael I after the death of the local Bulgarian ruler Strez in 1214. It is unclear to what extent Theodore's expansion involved direct conflict with the Bulgarian Tsar Boril (r. 1207–1218), but by 1217 he held Ohrid, Prilep, and most of the plain of Pelagonia, at least up to Strez's old capital at Prosek, and likely beyond, approaching the Strymon River. As the Greek historian Konstantinos Varzos has noted, the capture of Ohrid, seat of the eponymous archbishopric, was particularly important for the standing of the Epirote state and Theodore's aspirations. Theodore sponsored the election of the distinguished canonist Chomatianos to the archiepiscopal throne in 1217, and Chomatianos would repay that support with his steadfast championing of Epirote claims to the Byzantine imperial inheritance vis-à-vis the rival claims of Nicaea.

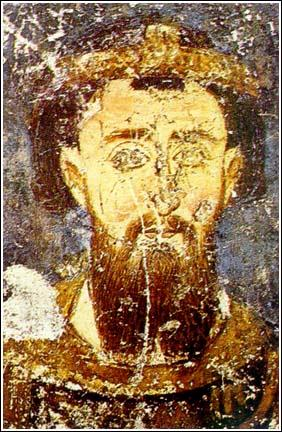
13th-century fresco portrait of Stefan II Nemanjić, from the Mileševa monastery

Following the Fourth Crusade, the Orthodox clergy in the two main Greek states, Epirus and Nicaea, had effectively become separated. In 1208, the Nicaeans had convened a synod and elected Michael Autoreianos as successor to the vacant see of the Patriarch of Constantinople. The election was uncanonical and therefore of questionable legitimacy. This in turn meant that Laskaris' imperial title was also open to challenge, as he had been crowned by the same Michael Autoreianos. Already under Michael I, two local synods of bishops had emerged in the Epirote domains to carry on administration of the Church, largely independent of the Patriarch, one at Naupaktos under John Apokaukos, and one at Ohrid under Chomatianos. The more ambitious Chomatianos soon became the pre-eminent "western" bishop, and sought to strengthen the de facto Epirote autonomy in ecclesiastical affairs, including the appointment of bishops for the local sees without the Patriarch's interference. This policy, which dovetailed with Theodore's own ambitions of independence from and rivalry towards Nicaea, brought the two branches of the Greek Church to an open quarrel, as the Nicaea-based patriarch Manuel I Sarantenos began appointing bishops of his own to Epirote sees, whom the Epirotes refused to accept. Despite his close ties to Epirus, Stefan II Nemanjić exploited the Epirote–Nicaean rivalry to his advantage to secure autocephaly for the Serbian Church, which traditionally had been under the jurisdiction of the Archbishop of Ohrid. Brushing aside Chomatianos' vehement objections, Stefan managed to have his brother Rastko, renamed Sava, consecrated by Manuel Sarantenos as autocephalous archbishop of Serbia in 1219. Theodore took care not to let the quarrels of the churchmen affect his cordial relations with the Serbian ruler.

Theodore's drive into Macedonia disquieted another local strongman, Alexius Slav, ruler of Melnik. A sworn enemy of Boril, Alexius had been abandoned by his erstwhile ally, the Latin Emperor, Henry of Flanders (r. 1205–1216), who in 1213 allied himself with Bulgaria. Facing a possible attack by Theodore as well, Alexius now preferred to make common cause with him, and married a niece of Theodore's wife.

=== Capture of Peter of Courtenay ===
The Epirote successes in Macedonia worried the Latins, as they opened the way to another attack on Thessalonica. The Kingdom of Thessalonica had been much weakened after the death of its founder, Boniface of Montferrat, in 1207, since which it had been ruled by a regency for his underage son Demetrius (r. 1207–1224). Interrupting a campaign against the Nicaeans in Asia Minor, Henry of Flanders hastened to Thessalonica. He took up contact with Boril and was preparing to march against Theodore when he suddenly died on 11 June 1216, probably of malaria, although poisoning by his second wife Maria of Bulgaria has also been suggested. The death of the warlike Henry, followed by that of Pope Innocent III, the instigator of the Fourth Crusade, a month later, was a major stroke of good fortune for Theodore as it removed two of his most eminent and capable opponents.

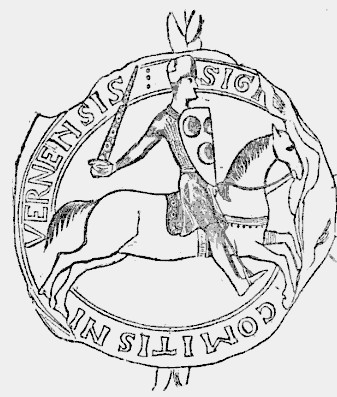
Seal of Peter of Courtenay

The barons of the Latin Empire then elected Peter II of Courtenay, a cousin of King Philip II Augustus of France, as the new Latin Emperor. Receiving news of his election, Peter assembled a small army of 160 knights and 5,500 foot and horse, and set out from France. After being crowned by Pope Honorius III in Rome, he set sail from Brindisi in April 1217. Peter landed at Dyrrhachium, which he had promised to conquer and return to Venice, while his wife Yolanda of Flanders sailed on to Constantinople. As in the Norman invasion of William II of Sicily (r. 1166–1189) in 1185, Peter intended (after capturing Dyrrhachium) to follow the ancient Via Egnatia to Thessalonica, wresting Albania and Macedonia from Epirote control in the process.

The commonly accepted version of events is that Dyrrhachium resisted with success, and as his casualties mounted Peter was forced to raise the siege and start his march towards Thessalonica. The march proved difficult, due to both the harsh terrain and the open hostility of the local population—the Western sources (the Annales Ceccanenses, Richard of San Germano, Philippe Mouskes, and the continuator of Robert of Auxerre) also stress the loyalty of the local Albanian population to Theodore. After a few days, Theodore with his army confronted Peter. Theodore requested talks with the papal legate, Giovanni Colonna, whom he assured of his goodwill and support. Western sources claim that Theodore offered to recognize the primacy of the Catholic Church and the suzerainty of the Latin Empire—as well as to support Peter in his planned participation in the Fifth Crusade—and offered the Latins food and guides through the mountains. Peter was glad to receive this unexpected help, and an agreement between the two was concluded. As soon as the Latins let their guard down, Theodore fell upon them. Peter of Courtenay, Colonna, the Latin Bishop of Salona, Count William I of Sancerre, and many Latin nobles were taken captive, while Peter's army scattered into small roving bands trying to survive. Akropolites, the chronicler Ephraim, and some Western sources on the other hand claim that Dyrrhachium was captured, and are followed by some modern scholars, including the Greek I. D. Romanos and the French Alain Ducellier. According to this view, Theodore offered to acknowledge Peter's suzerainty after the city's fall, only to treacherously ambush and defeat him. As the historian John Van Antwerp Fine remarks, "it is not important which version is correct"; the outcome was the same, and if lost, Dyrrhachium was quickly retaken after Peter's capture.

According to Philip Van Tricht, Theodore's actions were motivated by several factors, which led him to regard Peter as a threat to himself and his principality. Peter's attempt to return Dyrrhachium to Venice, even if it had failed for the moment, boded ill for the future. Peter's recognition of the rights of Demetrius' half-brother William VI of Montferrat over Thessalonica opened the way for William to take power there, and Theodore was loath to see Thessalonica—whose rulers still claimed suzerainty over Epirus—strengthened, particularly given the presence of his exiled nephew Michael II in the court of the Latin Principality of Achaea. At the same time, Theodore and his court resented the increased papal interference in Greek affairs, especially in the aftermath of the mission of Cardinal Pelagius, the previous papal legate to Constantinople, whose actions had deepened the rift between Greeks and Latins further.

=== Wars with the Latins and the capture of Thessalonica ===
Whatever the true course of events, Theodore's unexpected victory echoed throughout the Greek world, and greatly enhanced his standing; even the usually hostile Akropolites was forced to admit in his history that this feat was "of great help to the Romans". Conversely it dismayed Pope Honorius, who sent letters to the Latin princes of Greece as well as the Doge of Venice and Peter of Courtenay's son-in-law King Andrew II of Hungary (r. 1205–1235), urging them to engage themselves to secure the release of Peter and Colonna. He even wrote to Andrew and the French bishops to call for a crusade against Theodore, with which he also threatened Theodore in a letter. With the first contingents for the crusade assembling at Ancona in late 1217, and the Venetians eager to profit from the crusade to recover Dyrrhachium, the pressure bore fruit: in March 1218, Colonna was released, with Theodore offering his apologies and assurances of loyalty to the Pope. Honorius then changed his policy to the point of forbidding the Doge of Venice to harm Theodore in the slightest, hoping thereby to secure the release of more prisoners. Although some of the lesser barons were freed, Peter and many of the most senior lords remained in captivity until their death. It is unknown when Peter of Courtenay died, but this was probably before September 1219.

The capture of Peter of Courtenay left both major Latin states in northern Greece, Thessalonica and Constantinople, in the hands of female regents. Before arriving in Constantinople, where she gave birth to Peter's posthumous son, Baldwin II (r. 1228–1261), Yolanda had stopped at the Peloponnese. There she quickly came to appreciate the wealth and strength of the Principality of Achaea, and arranged the marriage of her daughter Agnes to the principality's heir, Geoffrey II of Villehardouin (r. c. 1229 – 1246). A politically astute ruler, Yolanda also secured her eastern border by offering her daughter Maria of Courtenay in marriage to Theodore Laskaris, who had just been widowed for the second time.

Before launching his final stroke against Thessalonica, Theodore also took care to secure his southern flank, by appointing his brother Constantine Komnenos Doukas as governor in Aetolia and Acarnania. An energetic governor, Constantine not only effectively shielded the Epirote domains from the threat of the Duchy of Athens, but soon recovered Neopatras and Lamia as well. Theodore himself turned his attention to clearing Thessaly of any remaining Latin presence, culminating in the surrender of the great Platamon Castle in 1218. Over the next few years, one by one, Theodore captured the fortresses around Thessalonica itself. Platamon controlled the entrance to the Thermaic Gulf, and with the surrender of Serres in late 1221, Theodore cut the land connection between Constantinople and Thessalonica as well. Thessalonica was left thereby, in the words of John Fine, "more or less an island in the midst of Theodore's possessions".

As the fall of Thessalonica appeared imminent, Pope Honorius excommunicated Theodore, ordered an embargo on horses, troops, and supplies from the Adriatic ports, and sent letters to Constantinople urging assistance to Demetrius. Demetrius himself went to Italy to seek aid, being received by the Pope in Rome in March 1222 and by Emperor Frederick II (r. 1220–1250) soon after. A crusade was proclaimed against Theodore, and troops began to gather in Italy. In the meantime, the Latin Empire, now under Robert of Courtenay (r. 1221–1228), was once more embroiled in warfare with Nicaea as it supported Laskaris' brothers in their challenge against the new Nicaean emperor, John III Doukas Vatatzes (r. 1222–1254). The first detachments of the assembling crusade, under Count Oberto II of Biandrate, arrived at Thessalonica in summer 1222 and joined the de facto regent, Guy Pallavicini. Theodore now hastened his move against Thessalonica. After preliminary operations in late 1222, in early 1223 he laid siege to the city. Honorius excommunicated him again, and redoubled his effort to promote the crusade, which had come to a standstill in the meantime. At the Pope's urging, Venice and Emperor Frederick promised aid. Robert of Courtenay also pledged to assist, while Honorius called upon the Latin princes of southern Greece to join in the effort. The crusade finally assembled at Brindisi in March 1224. In his instructions to his legate, however, Honorius did not rule out the possibility of Theodore coming to terms with the Crusaders. True to his word, in April 1224 Robert of Courtenay sent an army to besiege Serres. During the siege, the Latin generals learned of the disastrous defeat of the main Latin army at the hands of John III Doukas Vatatzes at the Battle of Poimanenon. They lifted the siege and hastened back to Constantinople, only to be intercepted by Theodore's men; most of the Latin army were killed or taken prisoner.

This double disaster destroyed the Pope's plans for the crusade, as he had envisaged it to land in Theodore's rear while he was engaged with Robert's army. At the same time, the prospective leader of the crusade, William VI of Montferrat, fell ill. In November, the Pope was forced to postpone the crusade's departure for the next spring. With news of the Latin defeats and the postponement of the crusade, the exhausted defenders of Thessalonica surrendered the city to Theodore sometime in December 1224. The crusade to relieve it sailed in March 1225, and landed in Thessaly at Halmyros. The Crusader army was soon decimated by dysentery, allegedly because the Greeks had poisoned the local water supply. William of Montferrat himself succumbed to it, and the remnants of the army left Greece. Demetrius of Montferrat still hoped to recover his realm with the help of Frederick II, but died in 1227.

== Emperor of Thessalonica ==
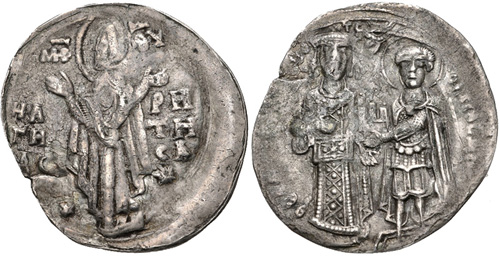
Billon trachy coin of Theodore as Emperor of Thessalonica

The capture of Thessalonica, traditionally the second city of the Byzantine Empire after Constantinople, was a major stroke against the Latins and greatly boosted Theodore's standing, so much that he now regarded himself as superior to Vatatzes, and openly claimed the Byzantine imperial title by putting on the purple boots reserved to the emperor. Indeed, one of his major supporters, the eminent Metropolitan of Naupaktos, John Apokaukos, in a letter to the Patriarch in 1222 declared that the Epirotes already regarded Theodore as their "God-sent regent and emperor", and later wrote to Theodore's wife expressing the hope that he might be able to assist at their imperial coronation at Thessalonica.

=== Coronation controversy with Nicaea ===
According to Byzantine custom, the coronation of an emperor could only take place in Constantinople and be performed by the Patriarch; yet Constantinople was still in Latin hands, and the Patriarch (now Germanus II, 1223–1240) resided in Nicaea. Theodore thus turned to the Metropolitan of Thessalonica, Constantine Mesopotamites, whom he had just restored to his see after removing the Latin prelate. Mesopotamites however recognized the Patriarch at Nicaea as legitimate, and steadfastly refused to perform the rite, despite pressure from Theodore, his brother Constantine, and John Apokaukos. Rather than submit, he preferred to return to exile. In response, in March 1225 Theodore convened a council of the bishops of his domains at Arta, chaired by Apokaukos. The council approved a declaration, composed by Apokaukos, which extolled Theodore's achievements against the Latins and Bulgarians, his liberation of Greek lands, eviction of Catholic priests and restoration of Orthodox bishops, and his imperial descent, and declared that the council recognized only him as emperor. Armed with this declaration, Theodore had the loyal Archbishop of Ohrid, Demetrios Chomatianos, perform the coronation instead.

Although Theodore appears to have assumed, and was addressed by, the imperial title almost immediately after the capture of Thessalonica, the date of his actual coronation is unknown. The French scholar Lucien Stiernon places it in the period between June 1227 and April 1228, but the Greek Apostolos D. Karpozilos rejects this, reasoning that Theodore had no obvious reason to delay his coronation for so long, and suggested that he was crowned in 1225, immediately after the council of Arta. Eleni Bees-Seferli on the other hand, based on the letters of Apokaukos, suggests a date between 3 April and August 1227, while Alkmini Stavridou-Zafraka has narrowed the date down to 29 May 1227.

As befitted a Byzantine emperor, Theodore began setting up a court at his new capital, and dispensed the usual court titles to his relatives and followers. Not much is known about the men that staffed Theodore's regime; most of the available information comes from the writings of Chomatianos. Theodore's brothers Manuel and Constantine were raised to the rank of Despot, the long-serving John Plytos became panhypersebastos and mesazon (chief minister), and a number of scions of old Byzantine aristocratic families, who had sought refuge in Epirus, were appointed as provincial governors alongside members of the local aristocracy. The title of doux was used, but unlike earlier times these were mostly civilian governors with little military authority. Theodore awarded titles with such largesse that formerly exclusive titles such as sebastos or megalodoxotatos were devalued and came to be held by city notables. His Nicaean rivals, notably Akropolites, mocked him for the haphazard way in which the titles were used and awarded, ignoring the old customs of Constantinople, as if he were "a Bulgarian or rather a barbarian". To secure his new capital, Theodore instituted a guard of "Tzakones" under a kastrophylax.

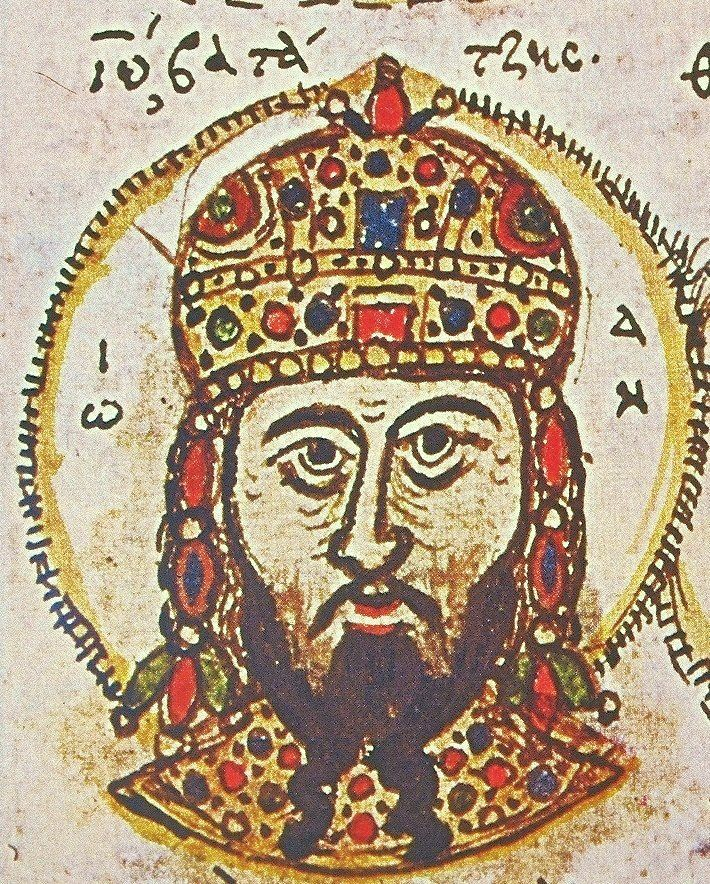
John III Doukas Vatatzes, Emperor of Nicaea, from a 15th-century manuscript of the Extracts of History of John Zonaras

John Vatatzes initially reacted to Theodore's proclamation as emperor by offering to recognize him as a sort of viceroy in his lands, but Theodore rejected this and publicly assumed the full titulature of the Byzantine emperors, as "basileus and autokrator of the Romans". Theodore's coronation deepened the rift between the western Greeks and Nicaea, which once again was expressed in the ecclesiastic sphere. At first, the Nicaeans tried to limit the blame to Chomatianos: though writing respectfully of Theodore himself, Patriarch Germanus II expressed his indignation at the presumption of Chomatianos in usurping the patriarchal privilege of crowning an emperor, while Chomatianos claimed that, as the successor of the ancient see of Justiniana Prima, he was an independent prelate and had the authority to do so.

In 1227, a synod of Epirote bishops in Arta tried to find a compromise, acknowledging the overall authority of the Patriarch at Nicaea but requesting administrative autonomy, i.e. the right for Theodore to appoint bishops in his domains. They gave the Patriarch three months to reply, and suggested that if he did not heed their proposals, they might be forced to recognize the supremacy of the Pope instead. Germanus replied by having the patriarchal synod condemn Theodore's assumption of the imperial title. The conflict escalated when Germanus appointed his own candidate to the vacant see of Dyrrhachium. Theodore expelled the bishop, and the Epirote synod instead elected a friend of Chomatianos, Constantine Kabasilas, as the bishop. Germanus now attacked Theodore directly. In response, George Bardanes composed a letter to Germanus, which insisted on Epirote ecclesiastical autonomy and challenged the very legality of Germanus' claims to the patriarchate. The result was a full schism between the Nicaean and Epirote churches that lasted until 1232/33.

=== Expansion into Thrace ===
Following Theodore's coronation, there were four rulers who claimed the imperial title and vied for control of Constantinople: Theodore, the Latin Emperor, Robert of Courtenay, John III Doukas Vatatzes of Nicaea, and the young but ambitious John Asen II (r. 1218–1241) of Bulgaria. The Latin Empire was a shadow of its former strength: following Poimanenon, the Latins had lost most of their territories in Asia, while in Europe, it was soon reduced to the environs of Constantinople itself. Already in 1224, or at least in 1225, Theodore captured Chalcidice with Mount Athos, and in spring 1225, he advanced through eastern Macedonia and western Thrace, seizing Christopolis, Xanthi, Gratianopolis, Mosynopolis and Didymoteicho. In an attempt to pre-empt him and block his advance onto Constantinople, the Nicaeans had answered the summons of the inhabitants of Adrianople and taken over the city from the Latins, possibly following the death of their lord Baldwin of Bethune in battle. The city had been left to his wife, an unnamed daughter of Theodore Branas and Agnes of France, possibly in the name of an minor heir. Theodore however crossed the Evros River and blockaded the city, until it agreed to surrender. The Nicaean army, under the protostrator John Ises and John Kammytzes, was allowed to withdraw unmolested to Asia with ships provided by Theodore.

The capture of Adrianople opened the path to Constantinople for Theodore. In order to secure his northern flank, he concluded an alliance with John Asen, sealed by the (second) marriage of his brother Manuel to Maria, an illegitimate daughter of Asen. At the same time, the Latins turned to Nicaea and concluded a peace treaty in exchange for further territorial concessions. This pact too was sealed by a marriage, of Theodore Laskaris' daughter Eudokia to the Latin baron Anseau de Cayeux. In the same summer of 1225, Theodore led his army to the environs of Constantinople, reaching the towns of Bizye and Vrysis. Anseau de Cayeux, leading the Latin army, was heavily wounded in the clashes, but Constantinople itself was not attacked. Not only was Theodore unprepared for a siege against the mighty Theodosian Walls, but news of William of Montferrat's landing at Thessaly forced him to break off operations and return west.

For reasons that are unknown, Theodore did not renew his attack on Constantinople in 1226 or the years thereafter. Instead, he seems to have occupied himself with domestic affairs, as well as taking care to improve relations with Frederick II during the latter's stop-over at Corfu and Cephallonia to lead the Sixth Crusade in 1228. In 1229, he even sent a company of Greek troops to serve under Frederick in Italy. At the same time, Theodore presided over a rupture in relations with Venice, after his governor in Corfu sequestered the cargo of a shipwrecked Venetian ship. Theodore issued an edict on 19 August 1228 prohibiting Venetian merchants from practising commerce in his realm. In January of the same year, Robert of Courtenay died, leaving the throne of the Latin Empire to his eleven-year-old brother, Baldwin II. With a regency taking over the governance of the state, the Latin Empire stood further enfeebled. At this moment, John Asen offered an alliance. Baldwin II would marry his daughter Helena, while John Asen would take over the regency and lend his assistance at repelling Theodore's attacks. The Latin barons viewed the offer with mistrust, as it would offer John Asen every opportunity to take over Constantinople himself; instead, they strung out negotiations, and eventually chose the 80-year-old but energetic John of Brienne (r. 1229–1237) as regent. Although the Bulgarian offer failed, it served to open a rift between Theodore and his nominal ally. In a move clearly directed against John Asen, in September 1228, Theodore agreed to a one-year truce with the Latin Empire's regent, Narjot of Toucy, with the border between the two empires running along a line from Ainos to Vrysis.

== Klokotnitsa and Bulgarian captivity ==
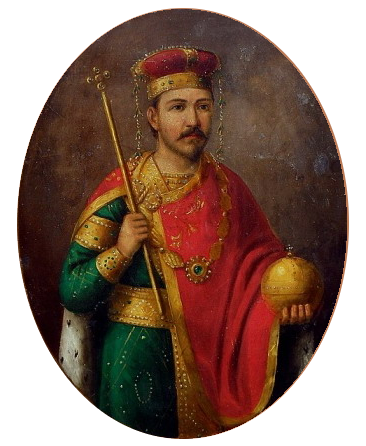
Modern representation of Bulgarian Emperor John Asen II

Finally, in late 1229, Theodore began assembling his forces at Thessalonica—including a contingent of troops sent by Frederick II—for the projected final attack on Constantinople. As his troops marched east in spring 1230, he unexpectedly turned his army north and followed the Evros valley into Bulgaria. Theodore's motives for this sudden change are debated. Contemporary and later historians like Akropolites denounced this as a sign of Theodore's duplicity and treachery. A more likely suggestion is that Theodore, hitherto undefeated in battle, desired to check Bulgarian power and avoid the possibility of the Bulgarians striking in his rear while he was engaged in besieging Constantinople. Although caught by surprise, John Asen II reacted rapidly. Allegedly affixing the text of the broken treaty to one of his spears as a flag, he rallied his troops and met Theodore in battle in April 1230. The ensuing Battle of Klokotnitsa was a crushing victory for the Bulgarian ruler, who took Theodore and many of his officers captive.

In the aftermath of Klokotnitsa, Bulgaria emerged as the mightiest power in the Balkans. Deprived of its energetic ruler, Theodore's empire collapsed: within a few months Thrace, most of Macedonia, and Albania, fell under Bulgarian rule. As John Asen II boasted in an inscription in the Holy Forty Martyrs Church at his capital of Tarnovo, he "occupied all the land from Adrianople to Dyrrhachium, Greek, Serbian, and Albanian alike", although Dyrrhachium itself apparently remained in Greek hands. The Latin Duchy of Philippopolis was also annexed, and Alexius Slav's principality in the Rhodope Mountains was extinguished in the process, with Alexius spending the rest of his life at Asen's court.

Theodore's brother Manuel, who managed to escape from Klokotnitsa, now took over the throne in Thessalonica. His domain was reduced to the environs of the city and his family's core territories in Epirus and Thessaly, as well as Dyrrhachium and Corfu, while his brother Constantine in Aetolia and Acarnania recognized his suzerainty. As a son-in-law of John Asen II, Manuel was allowed to maintain internal autonomy, but to all intents and purposes he was a client of the Bulgarian Tsar. At about the same time, Michael I's bastard son Michael II returned from exile and quickly succeeded, apparently with the support of the local population, in taking over control of Epirus. Manuel was forced to recognize the fait accompli under the pretense that Michael recognized his suzerainty, in token of which Manuel conferred him the title of Despot. In reality Michael was fully independent, and very quickly ceased to acknowledge Manuel's suzerainty; by 1236, he had seized Corfu. In order to preserve some freedom of manoeuvre and counter Asen's attempts to subordinate the Epirote Church to the Bulgarian Church of Tarnovo, Manuel turned to his brother's erstwhile rivals in Nicaea and brought an end to the ecclesiastical schism by acknowledging the legitimacy and superiority of the Nicaea-based Patriarch.

Theodore himself remained in captivity at Tarnovo for seven years. Initially he was treated with honour, but at some point during his captivity he was accused of plotting against John Asen II and blinded as a result. This was the customary Byzantine punishment for treason and means of sidelining potential political rivals. According to a contemporary letter written in Hebrew, Asen initially ordered two Jews to carry out the deed, for Theodore had been persecuting the Jews in his territory and confiscating their wealth to fund his campaigns. Theodore begged to be spared, and they refused to carry out the blinding, whereupon the enraged Tsar had them thrown from a cliff. Finally, in 1237 Theodore was released when Asen, recently widowed, fell in love with Theodore's sole unmarried daughter, Irene. Immediately after the marriage, Theodore was released and allowed to depart Tarnovo to wherever he wished.

== Return to Thessalonica and final years ==
=== Recovery of Thessalonica ===
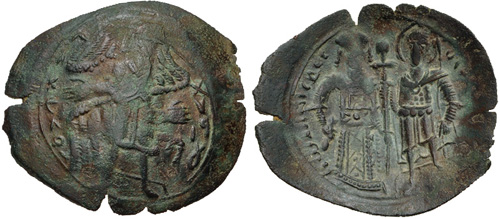
Billon trachy of John Komnenos Doukas as Emperor of Thessalonica

As soon as he was set free, Theodore returned to Thessalonica. Lacking any escort or followers, he disguised himself as a beggar in order to enter the city in secret. There he contacted old supporters and favourites, and organized a conspiracy that soon ousted Manuel and took over the city. As Byzantine custom barred him from re-assuming the imperial office due to his blinding, Theodore installed his son John Komnenos Doukas (r. 1237–1244) as emperor (without a coronation ceremony), but remained the real ruler of the empire in his son's name. John himself appears to have been mostly interested in religion, and more inclined to enter a monastery than to become emperor. Theodore had to persuade him that being named emperor was a God-given gift, and that he was indeed the rightful Emperor of the Romans due to his imperial descent.

The deposed Manuel was sent to exile at Attaleia in Asia Minor, while his wife Maria was allowed to return to her father. Despite Theodore's actions and the overthrow of his daughter and son-in-law, Akropolites reports that John Asen II remained favourably disposed towards Theodore due to his passionate love for Irene. Manuel did not remain quiescent in exile; determined to avenge himself, from Attaleia he secured passage through Turkish lands to Nicaea. There John Vatatzes welcomed him and agreed to support him, but not before he secured from Manuel oaths of loyalty to himself. Thus in early 1239 Manuel with six Nicaean ships set sail for Greece, landing near Demetrias in Thessaly. He received widespread support in the province, perhaps even from the local governor, Michael I's son-in-law Constantine Maliasenos, allowing him to raise an army and in a short time occupy Farsala, Larissa, and Platamon. Faced with the option of open civil war, Manuel and Theodore eventually came to terms by dividing the territories of Thessalonica among themselves. Manuel renounced his allegiance to Vatatzes and received Thessaly, John and Theodore kept Thessalonica and the remaining parts of Macedonia as far west as Vodena and Ostrovo, and Constantine was confirmed in his appanage of Aetolia and Acarnania. To further secure their position, both Theodore and Michael concluded treaties with the powerful Prince of Achaea, Geoffrey II of Villehardouin.

=== Submission of Thessalonica to Nicaea ===
Michael II in Epirus was not part of the brothers' agreement, and continued to pursue his own policies independently of his uncles. In 1241, when Manuel died, Michael moved quickly to occupy Thessaly. In June of the same year, John Asen II died, leaving the throne to his seven-year-old son Kaliman (r. 1241–1246). Coupled with the increasingly deteriorating situation of the Latin Empire, this development left John Vatatzes of Nicaea as the pre-eminent ruler of the region, and the obvious candidate for the capture of Constantinople.

Before undertaking any moves against Constantinople, Vatatzes realized the need to settle affairs with Thessalonica, and in particular with Theodore, whose ambition, capability, and machinations he feared. In 1240 or 1241 he therefore issued an invitation, with assurances of safe-conduct, to Theodore to visit Nicaea. Theodore accepted, and was treated with great honours by Vatatzes, who deferred to him as his "uncle" and dined with him at the same table. In reality, Theodore was a prisoner in Nicaea; he was not allowed to leave, and throughout his sojourn in the Nicaean court, preparations were in full swing for a campaign against Thessalonica. In spring 1242, Vatatzes crossed over into Europe at the head of his army, with Theodore accompanying him as an honorary prisoner. Facing no resistance, the Nicaean army and fleet arrived before Thessalonica. The city's garrison and inhabitants resisted with success and the Nicaean army, lacking heavy siege equipment, had to settle for a drawn-out blockade. Soon, however, news arrived of a Mongol invasion of Asia Minor, which forced Vatatzes to break off the campaign and return to Nicaea. Nevertheless, the Nicaean emperor kept this news a secret, and sent Theodore to his son to negotiate. John himself reportedly was willing to surrender the city outright, but his father convinced him to hold out for better terms. In the end, after 40 days of negotiations, John was allowed to keep control of Thessalonica, but renounced his imperial title and accepted Nicaean suzerainty and the title of Despot. Theodore was also allowed to remain at Thessalonica at his son's side.

John ruled as Despot in Thessalonica for two years, until his death in 1244. Theodore himself retired to Vodena, from where he supervised the affairs of state. On John's death he raised his younger son Demetrios Angelos Doukas (r. 1244–1246) in his place, and sent an embassy to Nicaea to announce the succession, as befitted the terms of vassalage agreed in 1242. If John was a religious ascetic, Demetrios was a dissolute youngster who enjoyed partying with his favourites and seducing married women. Although Theodore remained in charge of governance, Demetrios quickly became so unpopular that many leading citizens began viewing direct Nicaean rule with favour.

Things came to a head in autumn 1246, when Kaliman of Bulgaria died, leaving the country in the hands of a regency for his younger brother Michael Asen (r. 1246–1257). Vatatzes quickly attacked Bulgaria, and within three months captured most of Thrace and all of eastern and northern Macedonia, while Michael II of Epirus also took advantage of the opportunity to expand into Albania and northwestern Macedonia. At the close of this campaign in November, as Vatatzes was encamped at Melnik, he was informed of a conspiracy to depose Demetrios and deliver Thessalonica to him in exchange for a chrysobull guaranteeing the traditional rights and privileges of the city. Vatatzes readily granted this, and sent envoys to Demetrios calling for him to appear in person at his camp. Demetrios, suspicious of Vatatzes' intentions, refused, and the Nicaeans marched on Thessalonica. After a few days, the conspirators opened one of the gates to the Nicaean army, and the city was quickly captured. Demetrios was captured and exiled to Lentiana in Bithynia, while Thessalonica and all of Macedonia were placed under the governance of the Grand Domestic Andronikos Palaiologos. Theodore himself, isolated and without power in his refuge at Vodena, apparently remained uninvolved in these events.

=== Final throw of the dice and death ===
With Thessalonica secured, Vatatzes turned to Epirus, offering Michael II a marriage alliance between Michael's eldest son Nikephoros and his own granddaughter Maria. The offer was enthusiastically accepted by Michael's wife, Theodora Petraliphaina (a niece of Theodore's own wife), and the young couple were engaged at Pegae. Michael, who had not abandoned his family's ambitions, remained ambivalent about the Nicaean alliance, and Theodore used his influence over his nephew to turn him against it. Thus, in spring 1251, Michael launched a sudden attack on Thessalonica. The city resisted successfully, and in spring of the next year Vatatzes once more crossed into Europe to campaign against the Komnenoi Doukai. Theodore with Michael had turned to the north, capturing Prilep and Veles, and when they received news of Vatatzes' arrival, they withdrew to Epirus via Kastoria. Vatatzes besieged and captured Theodore's stronghold of Vodena, but soon became bogged down in skirmishing in the area of Kastoria. The stalemate was broken when two Epirote generals, John Glabas and Theodore Petraliphas, defected to the Nicaeans, followed shortly after by the ruler of Kruja, Golem. This forced Michael to come to terms with Vatatzes, ceding the fortresses he had captured as well as his remaining holdings in Macedonia, and reconfirming the marriage alliance with Nicaea. Furthermore, Vatatzes explicitly demanded the handing over of Theodore. The Epirote ambassadors met Vatatzes at Vodena, where they offered Theodore and the young Nikephoros as hostages. The latter was granted the title of Despot and soon allowed to return to Epirus, but Theodore was moved as a prisoner to Asia Minor. He died shortly after, around 1253.

== Assessment ==
The modern biographer of the Komnenoi, Konstantinos Varzos, described Theodore as an "energetic, resourceful, and exceedingly ambitious statesman, who inherited from his ancestor Alexios I Komnenos his endurance and persistence, but not the latter's intelligence, diplomacy, and ability to adapt". Varzos furthermore points out that despite his great ability, Theodore's ambition to be the one to recover Constantinople and his irreconcilable rivalry with Nicaea actually hampered and delayed the restoration of the Byzantine Empire by several decades.

Theodore's legacy left a lasting mark on the political worldview of the western Greeks: Byzantinist Donald Nicol remarks that "the memory of Theodore Doukas's victories and of his title to the Byzantine crown lived on in northern Greece and in the hearts of his descendants for many years to come". Michael II continued his uncle's rivalry with Nicaea, further delaying the recovery of Constantinople, and even after the restoration of the Byzantine Empire by Nicaea in 1261, the rulers of Epirus would continue to challenge the revived empire and uphold their own claim to the Byzantine throne.

== Family ==
By his wife Maria Petraliphaina, Theodore had four children:

1. Anna Angelina Komnene Doukaina, who married King Stefan Radoslav of Serbia
2. John Komnenos Doukas, who became Emperor of Thessalonica in 1237
3. Irene Komnene Doukaina, who married John Asen II
4. Demetrios Angelos Doukas, who succeeded as ruler of Thessalonica in 1244

== Footnotes ==
a: Although modern historiography frequently calls the Epirote state the "Despotate of Epirus", and often applies the title of Despot to both Michael I and Theodore, this is anachronistic, as neither of the two bore the title. It was Michael II who became the first Epirote ruler to be titled a Despot in the 1230s, while the designation of Epirus as a "despotate" first appears in Western sources in the 14th century.

== Sources ==
- Bees-Seferli, Eleni (1971–1974). "Ὁ χρόνος στέψεως τοῦ Θεοδώρου Δούκα ὡς προσδιορίζεται ἐξ ἀνεκδότων γραμμάτων τοῦ Ἰωάννου Ἀποκαύκου" [The time of the coronation of Theodore Doukas as determined by unpublished letters of John Apokaukos]. Byzantinisch-Neugriechische Jahrbücher (in Greek). 21. Athens: 272–279.
- Fine, John V. A. (1994) [1987]. The Late Medieval Balkans: A Critical Survey from the Late Twelfth Century to the Ottoman Conquest. Ann Arbor, Michigan: University of Michigan Press. ISBN 978-0-472-10079-8.
- Karpozilos, Apostolos D. (1973). The Ecclesiastical Controversy between the Kingdom of Nicaea and the Principality of Epiros (1217–1233). Thessaloniki: Centre for Byzantine Studies.
- Kazhdan, Alexander, ed. (1991). The Oxford Dictionary of Byzantium. Oxford and New York: Oxford University Press. ISBN 0-19-504652-8.
- Loenertz, Raymond-Joseph (1973). "Aux origines du despotat d'Épire et de la principauté d'Achaïe" [On the origins of the Despotate of Epirus and the Principality of Achaea]. Byzantion (in French). 43: 360–394.
- Lognon, Jean (1950). "La reprise de Salonique par les Grecs en 1224" [The recovery of Salonica by the Greeks in 1224]. Actes du VI Congrès international des études byzantines (Paris 1948). I: 141–146.
- Nicol, Donald M. (1984). The Despotate of Epiros, 1267–1479: A Contribution to the History of Greece in the Middle Ages. Cambridge: Cambridge University Press. ISBN 978-0-521-13089-9.
- Nicol, Donald M. (1988). Byzantium and Venice: A Study in Diplomatic and Cultural Relations. Cambridge: Cambridge University Press. ISBN 0-521-34157-4.
- Nicol, Donald M. (1993) [1972]. The Last Centuries of Byzantium, 1261–1453 (Second ed.). Cambridge: Cambridge University Press. ISBN 978-0-521-43991-6.
- Polemis, Demetrios I. (1968). The Doukai: A Contribution to Byzantine Prosopography. London: The Athlone Press.
- Stavridou-Zafraka, Alkmini (1988). "Συμβολή στο ζήτημα της αναγόρευσης του Θεοδώρου Δούκα" [Contribution to the question of the imperial proclamation of Theodore Doukas]. Αφιέρωμα στον Εμμανουήλ Κριαρά (in Greek). Thessaloniki: Centre for Byzantine Studies. pp. 37–62.
- Stiernon, Lucien (1959). "Les origines du despotat d'Épire. À propos d'un livre récent" [The origins of the Despotate of Epirus. On the occasion of a recent book]. Revue des études byzantines (in French). 17: 90–126. doi:10.3406/rebyz.1959.1200.
- Stiernon, Lucien (1964). "Les origines du despotat d'Épire. La date du couronnement de Théodore Doukas" [The origins of the Despotate of Epirus. The date of the coronation of Theodore Doukas]. Actes du XII Congrès international des études byzantines (in French). II. Belgrade: 197–202.
- Van Tricht, Filip (2011). The Latin Renovatio of Byzantium: The Empire of Constantinople (1204–1228). Leiden: Brill. ISBN 978-90-04-20323-5.
- Varzos, Konstantinos (1984). Η Γενεαλογία των Κομνηνών [The Genealogy of the Komnenoi] (PDF) (in Greek). Vol. B. Thessaloniki: Centre for Byzantine Studies, University of Thessaloniki.

Regnal titles
| Preceded by Michael I Komnenos Doukas | Ruler of Epirus; 1215–1224 | Vacant Epirus subsumed into the Empire of Thessalonica Title next held by Michael II Komnenos Doukas |
| New title Conquest of the Crusader Kingdom of Thessalonica | Emperor of Thessalonica; 1224–1230 | Succeeded by Manuel Komnenos Doukas |
