= John Komnenos Doukas =

Thessalonian emperor

- Emperor and Autocrat of the Romans
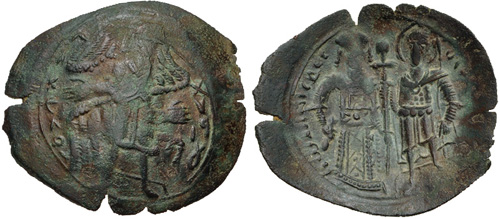
- Billon trachy coin of John as Emperor of Thessalonica

Emperor of Thessalonica Claimant Byzantine Emperor
- Predecessor: Manuel Doukas
- Successor: himself as despot
- Reign: 1237–1242

Despot of Thessalonica
- Reign: 1242–1244
- Predecessor: himself as emperor
- Successor: Demetrios Angelos Doukas
- Died: 1244
- Dynasty: Komnenos Doukas
- Father: Theodore Komnenos Doukas
- Mother: Maria Petraliphaina

John Komnenos Doukas (Greek: Ιωάννης Κομνηνός Δούκας, Iōannēs Komnēnos Doúkas), Latinized as Comnenus Ducas, was ruler of Thessalonica from 1237 until his death in 1244.

John was the eldest son of Theodore Komnenos Doukas and Maria Petraliphaina. In 1230 his father was captured together with his family in the Battle of Klokotnitsa by Ivan Asen II of Bulgaria. When his sister Irene married Ivan Asen II in 1237, John was released from captivity together with his now blind father Theodore and his younger brother Demetrios. Theodore and his sons made their way back to Thessalonica and incited a revolt against Theodore's brother Manuel Komnenos Doukas who had ruled the city since 1230. Since Theodore was blind, he installed his son John as ruler and retired to Vodena.

In 1239, the deposed Manuel returned with Nicaean help and made himself master of Thessaly. Unable to dislodge him, Theodore and John came to terms with the loss of that province. In 1241 Ivan Asen II died, removing both his suzerainty and his protection from Thessalonica. Now, if not earlier, John began using the imperial title once used by his father. This and his exposed position attracted the attention of Emperor John III Doukas Vatatzes of Nicaea. The Nicaean emperor invited Theodore to a conference and had him arrested, and in 1242 led his army against Thessalonica. Upon reaching Thessalonica, he sent Theodore to negotiate with his son and obtain his submission. John was easily induced to content himself with the title of despotes and to recognize the suzerainty of Nicaea. Securing these concessions, John III Doukas Vatatzes rapidly returned to Asia Minor to combat the invading Seljuk Turks.

John had exhibited little talent for governing and he is said to have desired to become a priest. He died in 1244 and was succeeded by his younger brother Demetrios.

Regnal titles
Preceded by Manuel Komnenos Doukas	Emperor of Thessalonica (after 1242 Despot under Nicaean suzerainty); 1237–1244	Succeeded by Demetrios Angelos Doukas as Despot in Thessalonica
Preceded by Manuel Komnenos Doukas	Emperor of Thessalonica (after 1242 Despot under Nicaean suzerainty); 1237–1244	Succeeded by Manuel Komnenos Doukas as Ruler of Thessaly
