= Empire of Thessalonica =

Byzantine successor state under warlord Theodore Komnenos

- 1224–1246
- Conquests of the Komnenodoukas dynasty of Epirus until the Battle of Klokotnitsa
- Status: Vassal of the Second Bulgarian Empire (1230–37) and of the Empire of Nicaea (1242–46)
- Capital: Thessalonica
- Common languages: Greek
- Religion: Greek Orthodoxy (official)
- Government: Monarchy
- Emperor, after 1242 Despot
  - 1224–1230: Theodore Komnenos Doukas
  - 1244–1246: Demetrios Angelos Doukas
- Historical era: Middle Ages
  - Epirus conquest of Thessalonika: 1224
  - Fall of Thessalonica to Nicaea: 1246
Preceded by	Succeeded by
Despotate of Epirus; Kingdom of Thessalonica	Despotate of Epirus; Empire of Nicaea

The Empire of Thessalonica is a historiographic term used by some modern scholars to refer to the short-lived Greek state centred on the city of Thessalonica between 1224 and 1246 (sensu stricto until 1242) and ruled by the Komnenodoukas dynasty of the Despotate of Epirus. At the time of its establishment during the struggle for Constantinople, the Empire of Thessalonica, under the capable Theodore Komnenos Doukas, rivaled the Empire of Nicaea and the Second Bulgarian Empire as the strongest state in the region, and aspired to capturing Constantinople, putting an end to the Latin Empire, and restoring the Byzantine Empire that had been extinguished in 1204.

Thessalonica's ascendancy was brief, ending with the disastrous Battle of Klokotnitsa against Bulgaria in 1230, where Theodore Komnenos Doukas was captured. Reduced to a Bulgarian vassal, Theodore's brother and successor Manuel Komnenos Doukas was unable to prevent the loss of most of his brother's conquests in Macedonia and Thrace, while the original nucleus of the state, Epirus, broke free under Michael II Komnenos Doukas. Theodore recovered Thessalonica in 1237, installing his son John Komnenos Doukas, and after him Demetrios Angelos Doukas, as rulers of the city, while Manuel, with Nicaean support, seized Thessaly. The rulers of Thessalonica bore the imperial title from 1225/7 until 1242, when they were forced to renounce it and recognize the suzerainty of the rival Empire of Nicaea. The Komnenodoukai continued to rule as Despots of Thessalonica for four more years after that, but in 1246 the city was annexed by Nicaea.

== Background ==
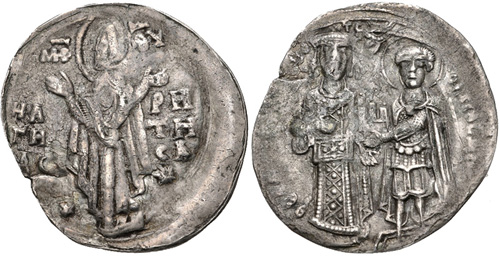
Billon trachy coin of Theodore Komnenos Doukas as Emperor of Thessalonica

After the Fourth Crusade captured Constantinople in April 1204, the Byzantine Empire dissolved and was divided between the Crusader leaders and the Republic of Venice. The Latin Empire was set up in Constantinople itself, while most of northern and eastern mainland Greece went to the Kingdom of Thessalonica under Boniface of Montferrat. At the same time, two major native Byzantine Greek states emerged to challenge the Latins and claim the Byzantine inheritance, the so-called Empire of Nicaea under Theodore I Laskaris in Asia Minor, and the so-called Despotate of Epirus in western Greece under Michael I Komnenos Doukas, while a third state, the so-called Empire of Trebizond, established a separate existence on the remote shores of the Pontus. Michael I Komnenos Doukas soon extended his state into Thessaly, and his successor Theodore Komnenos Doukas captured Thessalonica in 1224.

== Rise and decline ==
The capture of Thessalonica, traditionally the second city of the Byzantine Empire after Constantinople, allowed Theodore to challenge the Nicaean claims on the Byzantine imperial title. With the support of the bishops of his domains, he was crowned emperor at Thessalonica by the Archbishop of Ohrid, Demetrios Chomatenos. The date is unknown, but has been placed either in 1225 or in 1227/8. Having openly declared his imperial ambitions, Theodore turned his gaze onto Constantinople. Only the Nicaean emperor John III Doukas Vatatzes, and the Bulgarian emperor Ivan II Asen were strong enough to challenge him. In a bid to preempt Theodore, the Nicaeans seized Adrianople from the Latins in 1225, but Theodore quickly marched into Thrace and forced the Nicaeans to leave their European possessions to him. Theodore was free to assault Constantinople, but for unknown reasons delayed this attack. In the meantime, the Nicaeans and Latins had settled their differences, and although formally allied with Theodore, Ivan II Asen also entered talks for a dynastic alliance between the Latin Empire and Bulgaria. In 1230, Theodore finally marched against Constantinople, but unexpectedly turned his army north into Bulgaria instead. In the ensuing Battle of Klokotnitsa, Theodore's army was destroyed and he himself taken captive and later blinded.

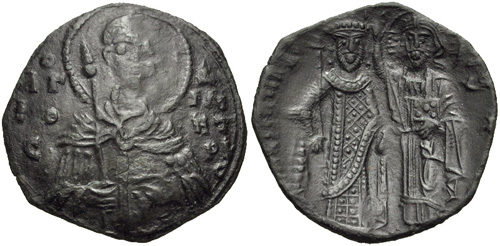
Trachy coin of Manuel Komnenos Doukas

As a state built upon rapid military expansion and reliant on the ability of its ruler, Thessalonica was unable to cope with defeat. Its territories in Thrace, as well as most of Macedonia and Albania, rapidly fell to the Bulgarians, who emerged as the strongest Balkan power. Theodore was succeeded by his brother Manuel Komnenos Doukas. He still controlled the environs of Thessalonica as well as the dynasty's lands in Thessaly and Epirus, but was forced to acknowledge himself Asen's vassal. In order to preserve some freedom of manoeuvre, Manuel even turned to his brother's erstwhile rivals in Nicaea, offering to acknowledge the superiority of Vatatzes and the Patriarch of Constantinople, who resided in Nicaea. Manuel was also unable to prevent Michael II Komnenos Doukas, the bastard son of his older bastard half-brother, Michael I, from returning from exile in the aftermath of Klokotnitsa and seizing control of Epirus, where he apparently enjoyed considerable support. In the end Manuel was forced to accept the fait accompli, and recognized Michael II as ruler of Epirus under his own suzerainty. As sign of this, he conferred on Michael the title of Despot. From the start, Manuel's suzerainty was rather theoretical, and by 1236–37 Michael was acting as an independent ruler, seizing Corfu, and issuing charters and concluding treaties in his own name.

Manuel's rule lasted until 1237, when he was deposed in a coup by Theodore. The latter had been released from captivity and secretly returned to Thessalonica after John II Asen fell in love with and married his daughter Irene. Having been blinded, Theodore could not claim the throne for himself and crowned his son John Komnenos Doukas, but remained the actual power behind the throne and virtual regent. Manuel soon escaped and fled to Nicaea, where he pledged loyalty to Vatatzes. Thus in 1239 Manuel was allowed to sail to Thessaly, where he began assembling an army to march on Thessalonica. After he captured Larissa, Theodore offered him a settlement, whereby he and his son would keep Thessalonica, Manuel would keep Thessaly, while another brother, Constantine Komnenos Doukas, would rule over Aetolia and Acarnania, which he had held as an appanage since the 1220s. Manuel agreed and ruled Thessaly until his death in 1241, at which point it was quickly occupied by Michael II of Epirus.

== Submission to Nicaea ==
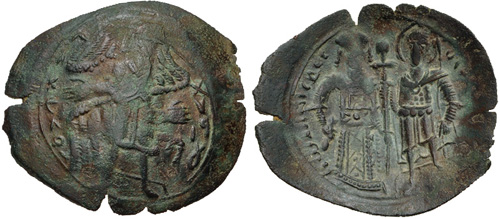
Trachy coin of John Komnenos Doukas

In 1241 an assurance of safe conduct induced Theodore to go to Nicaea, where Vatatzes imprisoned him. In the next year the Nicean army embarked for Europe and marched on Thessalonica. Vatatzes had to break off the campaign and return to Nicaea when he received news of a Mongol invasion of Asia Minor, but managed to browbeat John into submission: in exchange for renouncing his imperial title and recognizing Nicaean authority, John was allowed to remain as ruler of Thessalonica with the title of Despot.

In 1244, John died and was succeeded by his younger brother Demetrios Angelos Doukas, a frivolous ruler who quickly made himself unpopular with his subjects. Michael II of Epirus expanded his territory into western Macedonia in 1246, while Vatatzes returned to Europe and wrested much of Thrace as well as most of Macedonia from Bulgaria, which became his vassal. After this remarkable success, Vatatzes turned on Thessalonica, where leading citizens were already conspiring to overthrow Demetrios and deliver the city to him. When Vatatzes appeared before the city, Demetrios refused to come out and pay homage to his suzerain, but Nicaean supporters inside the city opened a gate and let the Nicaean army in. Thessalonica was incorporated into the Nicaean state, with Andronikos Palaiologos as its governor, while Demetrios was sent to a comfortable exile in estates granted to him in Asia Minor. Conversely his father was exiled to Vodena.

== Aftermath ==
Despite the end of the Thessalonian state, Michael II of Epirus now took up the mantle of his family's claims. Michael tried to capture Thessalonica and re-establish a strong western Greek state able to challenge Nicaea for supremacy and the Byzantine imperial inheritance. A first assault in 1251–53, encouraged by the old Theodore Komnenos Doukas, failed and forced Michael to come to terms. This did not long deter Michael, who after 1257 sought alliances with other powers against the growing menace of Nicaea, including the Latin Principality of Achaea and Manfred of Sicily. Michael's ambitions were shattered at the 1259 Battle of Pelagonia, in whose aftermath even Epirus and Thessaly were briefly occupied by the Nicaeans. More importantly, the victory opened the way for the Nicaean recapture of Constantinople on 15 August 1261, and the restoration of the Byzantine Empire under the Palaiologos dynasty.

=== Rulers ===
Image	Name	Reign	Succession & notes
	Theodore Komnenos Doukas; Θεόδωρος Κομνηνὸς Δούκας (Theodōros Komnēnos Doukas)	1224–1230	Half-brother of Michael I Komnenos Doukas, Was proclaimed Emperor after the capture of Thessalonica and conquered most of the Latin Empire, but was captured by the Bulgarians after the Battle of Klokotnitsa before he could conquer Constantinople. Was later released in 1237 and retired to Vodena.
	Manuel Komnenos Doukas (Μανουήλ Κομνηνός Δούκας) (Manouēl Komnēnos Doukas)	1230–1237	Brother of Theodore Komnenos Doukas. Was proclaimed Emperor after the capture of his brother; his reign was marked by political and military failures. Fled to Asia Minor after Theodore was released from captivity and regained control of Thessalonica in 1237. Would later return in 1239 with the support of the Nicaens and would conquer and rule Thessaly until his death in 1241.
	John Komnenos Doukas (Ιωάννης Κομνηνός Δούκας) (Iōannēs Komnēnos Doúkas)	1237–1244	The eldest son of Theodore Komnenos Doukas. Was captured alongside his father and brother Demetrios at the Battle of Klokotnitsa. After his release in 1237, he was installed by Theodore to rule Thessalonica. Showed little interest in governing and recognized the suzerainty of Nicaea and was willing to be demoted to the title of despotes.
	Demetrios Angelos Doukas (Δημήτριος Ἀγγελο Δούκας) (Dimitrios Angelo Doukas)	1244–1246	The younger son of Theodore. Inherited the title of despot after the death of his brother in 1244. Was unpopular among the aristocracy and was exiled to Bithynia after the Nicaens submitted Thessalonica.

== Sources ==
- Bartusis, Mark C. (1997). The Late Byzantine Army: Arms and Society 1204–1453. University of Pennsylvania Press. ISBN 0-8122-1620-2.
- Fine, John V. A. (1994) [1987]. The Late Medieval Balkans: A Critical Survey from the Late Twelfth Century to the Ottoman Conquest. Ann Arbor, Michigan: University of Michigan Press. ISBN 978-0-472-10079-8.
- Finlay, George (1877). A History of Greece: Mediaeval Greece and the empire of Trebizond, A.D. 1204–1461. Clarendon Press.
- Hendy, Michael F. (1999). Catalogue of the Byzantine Coins in the Dumbarton Oaks Collection and in the Whittemore Collection, Volume 4: Alexius I to Michael VIII, 1081–1261 – Part 1: Alexius I to Alexius V (1081–1204). Washington, District of Columbia: Dumbarton Oaks Research Library and Collection. ISBN 0-88402-233-1.
- Magdalino, Paul (1989). "Between Romaniae: Thessaly and Epirus in the Later Middle Ages". In Arbel, Benjamin; Hamilton, Bernhard; Jacoby, David (eds.). Latins and Greeks in the Eastern Mediterranean After 1204. Frank Cass & Co. Ltd. pp. 87–110. ISBN 0-71463372-0.
- Nicol, Donald M. (1993) [1972]. The Last Centuries of Byzantium, 1261–1453 (Second ed.). Cambridge: Cambridge University Press. ISBN 978-0-521-43991-6.
- Vasiliev, Alexander A. (1952). History of the Byzantine Empire, 324–1453. University of Wisconsin Press. ISBN 978-0-299-80926-3.
