= Manuel Doukas =

13th-century ruler (despotes) of Thessalonica

- Emperor and Autocrat of the Romans
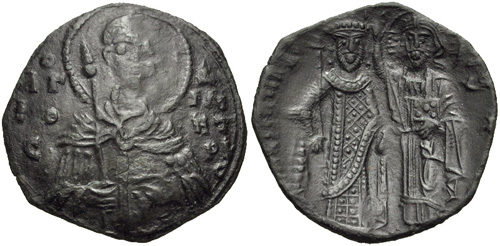
- Billon trachy coin of Manuel as ruler of Thessalonica

Emperor of Thessalonica Claimant Byzantine Emperor
- Reign: 1230–1237
- Predecessor: Theodore Komnenos Doukas
- Successor: John Komnenos Doukas

Ruler of Thessaly
- Reign: 1239–1241
- Predecessor: John Komnenos Doukas as Emperor of Thessalonica
- Successor: Michael II Komnenos Doukas as Despot of Epirus
- Born: c. 1187
- Died: c. 1241
- Spouse: Jefimija Nemanjić (1st); Maria Asen (2nd)
- Issue: Helena
- Family: Komnenodoukai
- Dynasty: Komnenodoukas branch of the Angelos dynasty
- Father: John Doukas

Manuel Komnenos Doukas, Latinized as Ducas (Greek: Μανουήλ Κομνηνός Δούκας, Manouēl Komnēnos Doukas; c. 1187 – c. 1241), commonly simply Manuel Doukas (Μανουήλ Δούκας) and rarely also called Manuel Angelos (Μανουήλ Ἄγγελος), was ruler of Thessalonica from 1230 to 1237 and, after his expulsion from Thessalonica, of Thessaly from 1239 until his death in c. 1241.

== Life ==
Manuel was the legitimate son of the sebastokratōr John Doukas. He was thus a first cousin of Emperors Isaac II Angelos and Alexios III Angelos, and a brother of Michael I Komnenos Doukas and Theodore Komnenos Doukas of Epirus.

He married the sister of the Serbian Grand Prince Stefan Nemanjić (r. 1196–1228).

== Career ==
Probably after 1225 or 1227, he received the court title of Despotes from his brother Theodore. In 1225 he married Maria Asen, the illegitimate daughter of Ivan Asen II of Bulgaria, helping to cement his brother's alliance with that country.

After his brother's defeat and capture by the Bulgarians at the Battle of Klokotnitsa in 1230, Manuel was allowed by Ivan Asen II to rule in Thessalonica and its environs with the title of despotes. At one point Manuel attempted to make contact with the papacy, but in 1232 the longstanding rift with the Eastern Patriarchate in Nicaea was finally healed. In 1235, Manuel joined forces with the Nicaeans and Bulgarians in the siege of Constantinople by John Duka Vatatses and Tsar Ivan Asen II.

Manuel ruled until 1237, when his widowed father-in-law Ivan Asen II married Irene, the daughter of the imprisoned Theodore. At this point, Theodore and his sons were released from captivity and decided to regain control of Thessalonica. Manuel was unsuccessful in his efforts to gain the support of Prince Geoffrey II Villehardouin of Achaea and was forced to flee to Asia Minor.

After a spell with the Seljuks of Rum and in Nicaea, Manuel returned to Greece in 1239 with the support of Nicaea and captured several fortresses, including Larissa and Pharsalos, from Theodore's son John Komnenos Doukas, establishing himself as ruler of Thessaly. Theodore and John had to agree on a division of the family lands. When Manuel died around 1241, the area passed into the hands of his other nephew, Michael II Komnenos Doukas of Epirus.

== Family ==
Manuel married the Serbian princess of unknown name, sister of Stefan Nemanjić (r. 1196–1228). However, she could not have lived long, because in 1225 he married again, with the Bulgarian princess Maria Asen, illegitimate daughter of Ivan Asen II and a mistress, in an arranged marriage, part of a pact. There is no information that they had any children.

Manuel may have had a daughter named Helena, who married Guglielmo I da Verona, Triarch of Euboea, father of Guglielmo II da Verona.

== Sources ==
- Kazhdan, Alexander, ed. (1991). The Oxford Dictionary of Byzantium. Oxford and New York: Oxford University Press. ISBN 0-19-504652-8.
- Polemis, Demetrios I. (1968). The Doukai: A Contribution to Byzantine Prosopography. London: The Athlone Press.
- Varzos, Konstantinos (1984). Η Γενεαλογία των Κομνηνών [The Genealogy of the Komnenoi] (PDF) (in Greek). Vol. B. Thessaloniki: Centre for Byzantine Studies, University of Thessaloniki.

Regnal titles
Preceded by Theodore Komnenos Doukas	Emperor of Thessalonica; 1230–1237	Succeeded by John Komnenos Doukas
Preceded by John Komnenos Doukas as Emperor of Thessalonica	Ruler of Thessaly; 1239–1241	Succeeded by Michael II Komnenos Doukas as Despot of Epirus
