= Despotate of Epirus =

Byzantine rump state (1204–1479)

Despotate of Epirus Δεσποτᾶτον τῆς Ἠπείρου (Medieval Greek)
- 1205–1337; 1356–1479
- Flag Coat of arms of Carlo I Tocco, founder of the last ruling dynasty of Epirus, as count of Cephalonia (dexter) and despot of Epirus (sinister)

- Epirus in 1205–1230
- Status: Rump state of the Byzantine Empire
- Capital: Arta (1205–1337/40, 1430–49); Thessalonica (1227–1230); Ioannina (1356–1430); Angelokastron (1449–60); Vonitsa (1460–1479)
- Official languages: Medieval Greek
- Common languages: Medieval Greek, Old Albanian, Old Aromanian, Middle Bulgarian
- Religion: Greek Orthodoxy
- Government: Monarchy
- Despot of Epirus
  - 1205–1214: Michael I Komnenos Doukas
  - 1448–1479: Leonardo III Tocco
- Historical era: High Medieval
  - Established: 1205
  - Byzantine conquest: 1337
  - Re-establishment by Nikephoros II Orsini: 1356
  - Ottoman conquest of Vonitsa: 1479
- Currency: Denier
Preceded by
Byzantine Empire under the Angelos dynasty
Empire of Thessalonica
Despotate of Arta
Principality of Arbanon
Succeeded by
Byzantine Empire under the Palaiologos dynasty
Ottoman Empire
- Today part of: Albania; Bulgaria; Greece; North Macedonia

The Despotate of Epirus (Medieval Greek: Δεσποτᾶτον τῆς Ἠπείρου) was one of the Greek rump states of the Byzantine Empire established in the aftermath of the Fourth Crusade in 1204 by a branch of the Angelos dynasty, the Komnenodoukas dynasty. It claimed to be the legitimate successor of the Byzantine Empire during the subsequent struggle for Constantinople, along with the Empire of Nicaea and the Empire of Trebizond; its rulers briefly proclaiming themselves as Emperors in 1227–1242, during which it is most often called the Empire of Thessalonica.

The Despotate was centred on the region of Epirus, encompassing also the western portion of Greek Macedonia, Thessaly, western Greece as far south as Nafpaktos, and Albania. Through a policy of aggressive expansion under Theodore Komnenos Doukas the Despotate of Epirus also briefly came to incorporate central Macedonia, with the establishment of the Empire of Thessalonica in 1224, and Thrace as far east as Didymoteicho and Adrianople. Theodore was on the verge of recapturing Constantinople and restoring the Byzantine Empire before the Battle of Klokotnitsa in 1230, where he was defeated by the Bulgarian Empire. Afterwards, the Epirote state contracted to its core in Epirus and Thessaly, and was forced into vassalage to other regional powers. It nevertheless managed to retain its autonomy until being conquered by the restored Palaiologan Byzantine Empire in c. 1337. In the 1410s, Carlo I Tocco, Count Palatine of Cephalonia and Zakynthos, managed to reunite the core of the Epirote state, but his successors gradually lost it to the advancing Ottoman Empire, with the last stronghold, Vonitsa, falling to the Ottomans in 1479.

== Nomenclature ==
In traditional and modern historiography, the Epirote state is usually termed the "Despotate of Epirus" and its rulers are summarily attributed the title of "Despot" from its inception, but this use is not strictly accurate. First of all, the title of "Despot" was not borne by all Epirote rulers: the state's founder, Michael I Komnenos Doukas, never used it, and is only anachronistically referred to as "Despot of Epirus" in 14th-century Western European sources. His successor Theodore Komnenos Doukas did not use it either, and actually crowned himself emperor (basileus) at Thessalonica c. 1225. The first ruler of Epirus to receive the title of Despot was Michael II, from his uncle Manuel of Thessalonica in the 1230s, and then again, as a sign of submission and vassalage, from the Nicaean emperor John III Vatatzes. Earlier historians assumed that Michael I was indeed named "Despot" by the deposed emperor Alexios III Angelos after ransoming him from Latin captivity in c. 1206/7 or c. 1210; this has been disproven by more recent research.

Furthermore, even after Michael II, speaking of the Epirote rulers as "Despots of Epirus" is technically incorrect. The title of Despot did not imply any specific territorial jurisdiction, nor was it hereditary; it was merely the highest rank in the Byzantine court hierarchy, awarded by a reigning emperor to close relatives, usually his sons. Consequently, it was often borne by the princes sent to govern semi-autonomous appanages and only later came to be associated with these territories as the practice became regularized (aside from Epirus, the Despotate of the Morea is the most notable case). The territorial term "despotate" itself (in Greek δεσποτᾶτον, despotaton) was first used in contemporary sources for Epirus only from the 14th century on, e.g. in the Chronicle of the Morea, in the history of John Kantakouzenos, the hagiography of St. Niphon, or the Chronicle of the Tocco, where the inhabitants of the Despotate are referred to as the Despotatoi. The term "Despotate of Epirus" is thus sometimes replaced by "(Independent) State of Epirus" in more recent historiography.

The Epirote realm itself did not have an official name. Contemporaries, particularly in Western Europe, used the term Romania (Greek: Ῥωμανία, romanized: Rhōmania, lit. 'land of the Romans'), which generally referred to the whole Byzantine Empire, to refer specifically to Epirus, as seen in the Latin title of Despotus Romanie claimed by Philip I of Taranto and his son Philip of Apulia, Nicholas Orsini, and later Carlo I Tocco. In the Byzantine world, the term Dysis (Δύσις), meaning "West", which historically referred to Dalmatia, Macedonia and Sicily, or even the entire European part of the Empire, also came into use already in the 13th century when juxtaposing Epirus to its eastern rival, the Empire of Nicaea, which was then called Anatolē (Ἀνατολή), "East". Moreover, the term "Hellenes" was widely used instead of the earlier "Romans" by the 13th-century court of the Despotate to describe its population.

== Foundation ==
The Epirote state was founded in 1205 by Michael Komnenos Doukas, a cousin of the Byzantine emperors Isaac II Angelos and Alexios III Angelos. At first, Michael allied with Boniface of Montferrat, but having lost the Morea (Peloponnese) to the Franks at the battle of the Olive Grove of Koundouros, he went to Epirus, where he considered himself the Byzantine governor of the old province of Nicopolis and revolted against Boniface. Epirus soon became the new home of many refugees from Constantinople, Thessaly, and the Peloponnese, and Michael was described as a second Noah, rescuing men from the Latin flood. John X Kamateros, the Patriarch of Constantinople, did not consider him a legitimate successor and instead joined Theodore I Laskaris in Nicaea; Michael instead recognized the authority of Pope Innocent III over Epirus, cutting ties to the Eastern Orthodox Church.

Henry of Flanders demanded that Michael submit to the Latin Empire, which he did, at least nominally, by allowing his daughter to marry Henry's brother Eustace in 1209. Michael did not honour this alliance, assuming that mountainous Epirus would be mostly impenetrable by any Latins with whom he made and broke alliances. Meanwhile, Boniface's relatives from Montferrat made claims to Epirus as well, and in 1210 Michael allied with the Venetians and attacked Boniface's Kingdom of Thessalonica. Pope Innocent III excommunicated him in response. Henry forced Michael into a renewed nominal alliance later that year.

Michael turned his attention to capturing other strategically important Latin-held towns, including Larissa and Dyrrhachium. He also took control of the ports on the Gulf of Corinth. In 1214 he captured Corcyra from Venice, but he was assassinated later that year and was succeeded by his half-brother Theodore.

== Conflict with Nicaea and Bulgaria ==
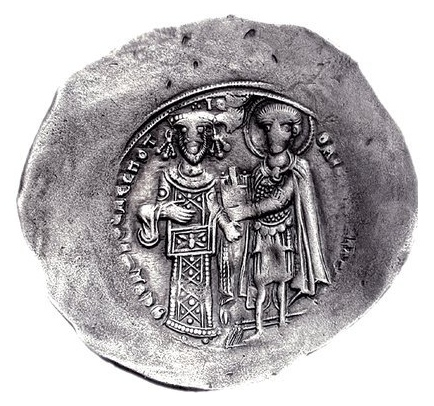
Coin of Theodore Komnenos Doukas as Emperor of Thessaloniki, c. 1227

Theodore Komnenos Doukas immediately set out to attack Thessalonica, and he fought with the Bulgarians along the way. Henry of Flanders died on the way to counterattack, and in 1217 Theodore captured his successor Peter of Courtenay, most likely executing him. The Latin Empire fell into disarray after losing the Battle of Poimanenon to the Nicaeans, and could not stop Theodore from capturing Thessalonica in 1224. Theodore now challenged Nicaea for the imperial title and crowned himself emperor, founding the short-lived Empire of Thessalonica. In 1225, after John III Doukas Vatatzes of Nicaea had taken Adrianople, Theodore arrived and took it back from him. Theodore also allied with the Bulgarians and drove the Latins out of Thrace. In 1227 Theodore crowned himself Byzantine emperor, although this was not recognized by most Greeks, especially not the Patriarch in Nicaea.

In 1230 Theodore broke the truce with Bulgaria, hoping to remove Ivan Asen II, who had held him back from attacking Constantinople. In the battle of Klokotnitsa (near Haskovo in Bulgaria) the Bulgarian emperor defeated Theodore, capturing and later blinding him. His brother Manuel Komnenos Doukas took power in Thessalonica, but Epirus itself soon broke away under Michael I's illegitimate son, Michael II Komnenos Doukas. Manuel awarded Michael the title of Despot—making Michael the first Epirote ruler to bear the title—as a sign of his nominal dependency on Thessalonica, but Michael was de facto independent, which he demonstrated by seizing Corfu in ca. 1236. In the rump Empire of Thessalonica, after Theodore was released in 1237, he overthrew his brother Manuel, and set up his son John Komnenos Doukas as ruler of Thessalonica.

== Nicaean and Byzantine suzerainty ==
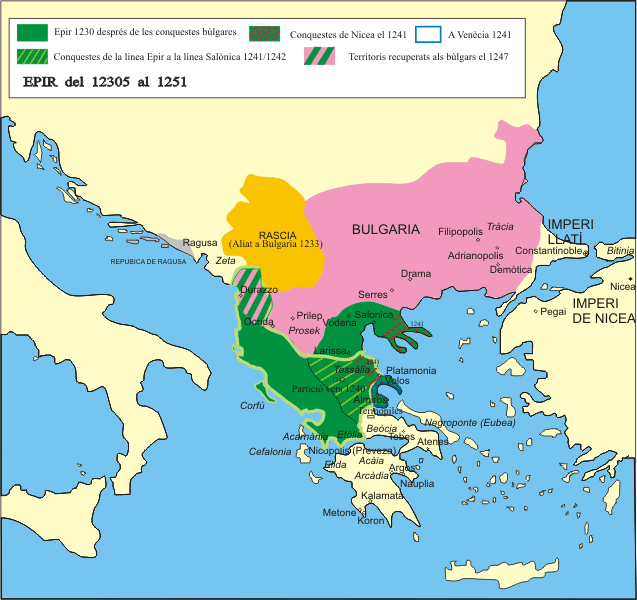
The despotate of Epirus from 1230 to 1251

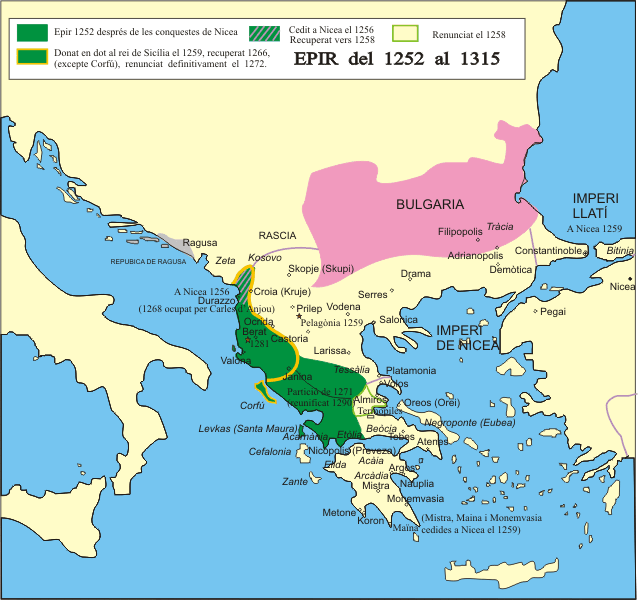
The despotate of Epirus from 1252 to 1315

Thessalonica never regained its power after the battle of Klokotnitsa. Theodore's younger son Demetrios Angelos Doukas lost Thessalonica to Nicaea in 1246 and Michael II of Epirus allied with the Latins against the Nicaeans. In 1248 John III Doukas Vatatzes of Nicaea forced Michael to recognize him as emperor, and officially recognized him in turn as despotēs in Epirus. Vatatzes' granddaughter Maria later (in 1256) married Michael's son Nikephoros, although she died in 1258. Also in 1248 Michael's daughter Anna married William II, Prince of Achaea, and Michael decided to honour this alliance over his obligations to Vatatzes. The allies were defeated in the ensuing conflict at the Battle of Pelagonia in 1259.

Emperor Theodore II Laskaris allied with Michael II, and their children, betrothed by John years before, finally married in 1256, with Theodore receiving Dyrrhachium in return. Michael did not accept this transfer of land, and in 1257 he revolted, defeating a Nicaean army led by George Acropolites. As Michael marched on Thessalonica, he was attacked by King Manfred of Sicily, who conquered Albania and Corcyra. However, Michael immediately allied with him by marrying his daughter Helena to him. After Theodore II died, Michael, Manuel, and William II fought the new Nicaean emperor, Michael VIII Palaiologos. The alliance was very unstable and in 1259 William was captured at the disastrous Battle of Pelagonia. Michael VIII went on to capture Michael II's capital of Arta, leaving Epirus with only Ioannina and Vonitsa. Arta was recovered by 1260 while Michael VIII was occupied against Constantinople.

== Italian invasions ==
After Michael VIII restored the empire in Constantinople in 1261 he frequently harassed Epirus, and forced Michael's son Nikephoros to marry his niece Anna Palaiologina Kantakouzene in 1265. Michael considered Epirus a vassal state, although Michael II and Nikephoros continued to ally with the Princes of Achaea and the Dukes of Athens. In 1267 Corcyra and much of Epirus were taken by Charles of Anjou, and in 1267/68 Michael II died. Michael VIII did not attempt to annex Epirus directly, and allowed Nikephoros I to succeed his father and deal with Charles, who captured Dyrrhachium in 1271. In 1279 Nikephoros allied with Charles against Michael VIII, agreeing to become Charles' vassal. With Charles' defeat soon after Nikephoros lost Albania to the Byzantines.

Under Andronikos II Palaiologos, son of Michael VIII, Nikephoros renewed the alliance with Constantinople. Nikephoros, however, was persuaded to ally with Charles II of Naples in 1292, although Charles was defeated by Andronikos's fleet. Nikephoros married his daughter to Charles's son Philip I of Taranto and sold much of his territory to him. After Nikephoros's death in c. 1297 Byzantine influence grew under his widow Anna, Andronikos's cousin, who ruled as regent for her young son Thomas I Komnenos Doukas. In 1306 she revolted against Philip in favour of Andronikos; the Latin inhabitants were expelled but she was forced to return some territory to Philip. In 1312 Philip abandoned his claim to Epirus and claimed the defunct Latin Empire of Constantinople instead as the inheritance of his wife Catherine II of Valois, Princess of Achaea.

== Collapse of the despotate ==
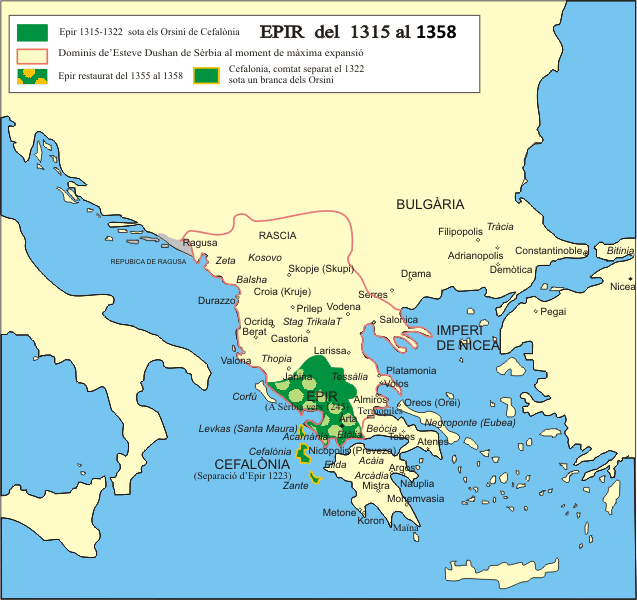
The despotate of Epirus from 1315 to 1358

Anna succeeded in marrying off Thomas to a daughter of Michael IX, but Thomas was assassinated in 1318 by his cousin Nicholas Orsini, who married his widow and claimed to rule not only Epirus, but all of Greece; his rule was limited only to Akamania, or the southern part of Epirus. In 1323 he was overthrown by his brother John, who attempted to balance submission to Constantinople with cooperation with the Angevins of Naples, who also claimed Greece as part of their domains. John was poisoned around 1335 by his wife Anna, who became regent for their son Nikephoros II. In 1337 the new Emperor, Andronikos III Palaiologos, arrived in northern Epirus with an army partly composed of 2,000 Turks contributed by his ally Umur of Aydın. Andronikos first dealt with unrest due to attacks by Albanians and then turned his interest to the Despotate. Anna tried to negotiate and obtain the Despotate for her son when he came of age, but Andronikos demanded the complete surrender of the Despotate to which she finally agreed. Thus Epirus came peacefully under imperial rule, with Theodore Synadenos as governor.

The imperials had insisted that Nikephoros would be engaged to one of the daughters of the emperor's right-hand man, John Kantakouzenos. When the time of the engagement came, Nikephoros had vanished. Andronikos learned that Nikephoros had fled to Italy, with the help of members of the Epirote aristocracy who supported an independent Epirus. He stayed in Taranto, Italy, in the court of Catherine II of Valois (Philip of Taranto's widow), the titular empress of Constantinople.

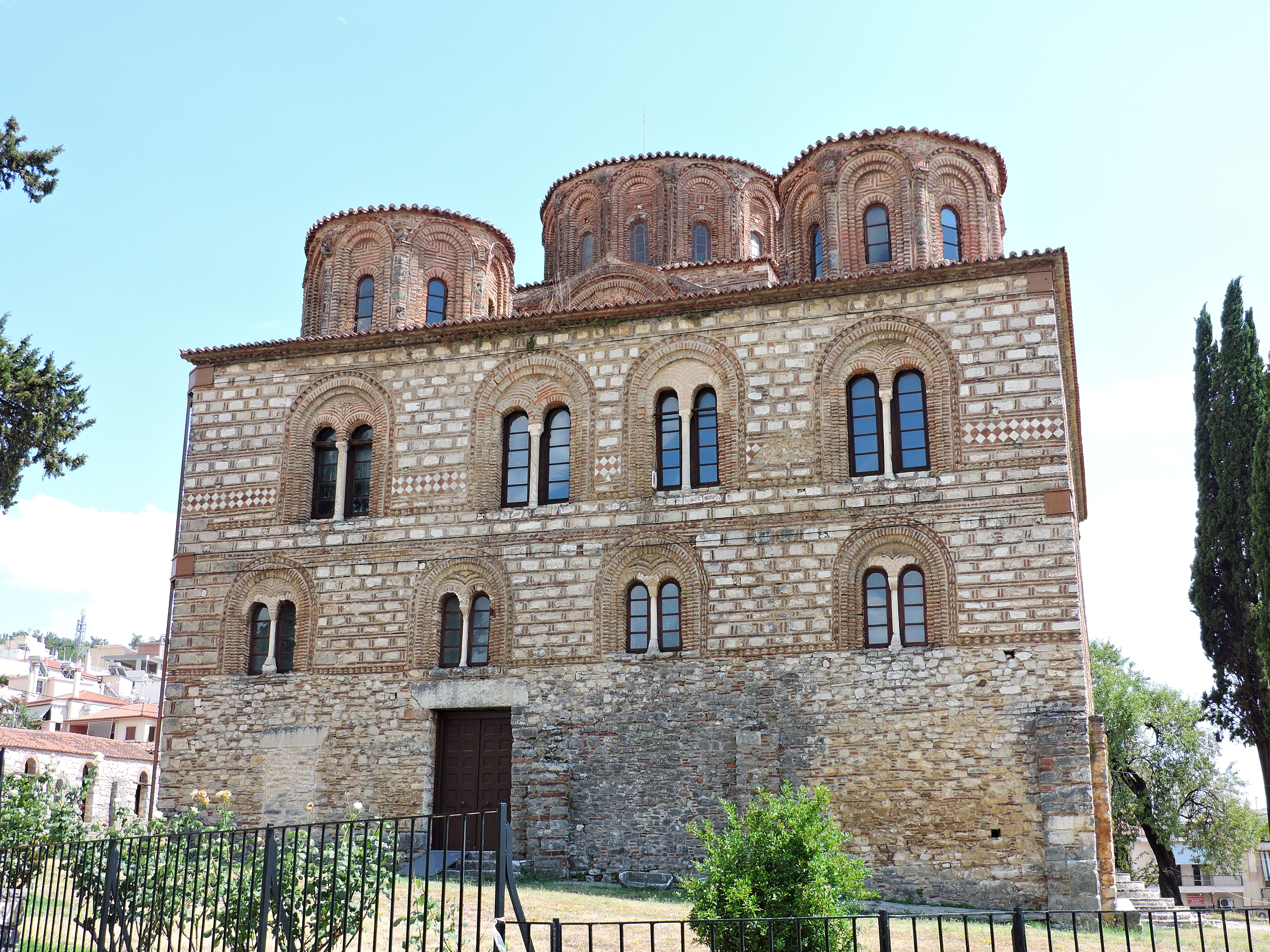
The Paregoretissa Church, the new cathedral of the Despotate's capital, Arta, built in the 13th century during the reign of Nikephoros I Komnenos Doukas.

In 1339 a revolt began, supported by Catherine of Valois, who had previously moved to the Peloponnese, and by Nikephoros who had returned to Epirus, based in Thomokastron. By the end of the year the imperial army returned to the area, and in the following year, 1340, Andronikos III himself arrived together with John Kantakouzenos. Nikephoros was persuaded through diplomacy to recognize the authority of the emperor. He surrendered Thomokastron, married Maria Kantakouzene, the daughter of John Kantakouzenos, and received the title of panhypersebastos.

The Empire soon fell into a civil war between John V Palaiologos and John VI Kantakouzenos, and Epirus was conquered by the Serbian tsar Stefan Dušan in 1348, who appointed his brother, despot Simeon Nemanjić-Palailogos as governor of the province. Nikephoros II took advantage of the Byzantine civil war and the death of Dušan (1355) to escape and to reestablish himself in Epirus in 1356, to which he also added Thessaly. Nikephoros was killed in battle putting down an Albanian revolt in 1359, and the territory of the former despotate became a component part of the personal Empire of Dušan's brother Simeon Nemanjić-Palailogos. Simeon was also governing Thessaly at the time, and, as the Chronicle of Ioannina shows, he left much of the territory under the control of Albanian clans establishing short-lived entities: the clan of Pjetër Losha held Arta, and the clan of Muriq Shpata held Aetoloacarnania, with Angelokastron as its capital.

In 1367 a part of the Epirotan Despotate was resurrected under local Serbian nobleman Thomas II Preljubović, who kept Ioannina. After Thomas' death in 1384, his widow remarried in 1385 and transferred the Despotate to homage of Italian nobility. The state tradition was carried on by the Serbian and Italian rulers of Ioannina, who solicited aid from the Ottoman Turks against the Albanians. In 1399 the Albanian leader of Principality of Gjirokastër, Gjon Zenebishi captured the Despot Esau de' Buondelmonti and released him after 15 months, when his relatives in Italy offered a huge amount of money as a ransom. By 1416 the Tocco family of Cephalonia succeeded in reuniting Epirus, or at least in asserting their control over its towns.

=== Ottoman conquest of Epirus ===
Hence, internal dissension eased the Ottoman conquest, which proceeded with the capture of Ioannina in 1430, Arta in 1449, Angelokastron in 1460, and finally Vonitsa in 1479. During the Ottoman conquest of the Despotate of Epirus, the islands of Santa Mavra, Cephalonia and Ithaka, the ducal officials were "cut to pieces", the castle of Cephalonia was burned and the peasantry was enslaved and taken to Constantinople as a gift to the sultan, who engaged in "slave breeding" by separating husbands and wives and "mating" them with Ethiopian slaves with the purpose of "producing a race of grey slaves", while other slaves from St Mavra were sold by Ahmed Pascha for ten soldi apiece to slavery in the Ottoman Empire. With the exception of several coastal Venetian possessions, this was the end of Frankish rule in mainland Greece.

== Bibliography ==
- Fine, John Van Antwerp Jr. (1994) [1987]. The Late Medieval Balkans: A Critical Survey from the Late Twelfth Century to the Ottoman Conquest. Ann Arbor, Michigan: University of Michigan Press. ISBN 0472082604.
- Kazhdan, Alexander, ed. (1991). The Oxford Dictionary of Byzantium. Oxford and New York: Oxford University Press. ISBN 978-0-19-504652-6.
- Magdalino, Paul (1989). "Between Romaniae: Thessaly and Epirus in the Later Middle Ages". In Arbel, Benjamin; Hamilton, Bernhard; Jacoby, David (eds.). Latins and Greeks in the Eastern Mediterranean After 1204. Frank Cass & Co. Ltd. pp. 87–110. ISBN 0-71463372-0.
- Nicol, Donald M. (1984) [1957]. The Despotate of Epiros 1267–1479: A Contribution to the History of Greece in the Middle Ages (2nd expanded ed.). Cambridge University Press. ISBN 9780521261906.
- Nicol, Donald M. (1993) [1972]. The Last Centuries of Byzantium, 1261–1453 (2. ed.). Cambridge University Press. ISBN 9780521439916.
- Soulis, George Christos (1984). The Serbs and Byzantium during the reign of Tsar Stephen Dušan (1331–1355) and his successors. Washington: Dumbarton Oaks Library and Collection. ISBN 9780884021377.
- Soustal, Peter; Koder, Johannes (1981). Tabula Imperii Byzantini, Band 3: Nikopolis und Kephallēnia (in German). Vienna: Verlag der Österreichischen Akademie der Wissenschaften. ISBN 3-7001-0399-9.
- Stavridou-Zafraka, Alkmini (1990). Νίκαια και Ήπειρος τον 13ο αιώνα. Ιδεολογική αντιπαράθεση στην προσπάθειά τους να ανακτήσουν την αυτοκρατορία [Nicaea and Epirus in the 13th century. Ideological confrontation in their effort to recover the empire] (in Greek). Thessaloniki.
- Stavridou-Zafraka, Alkmini (1992). "Η κοινωνία της Ηπείρου στο κράτος του Θεόδωρου Δούκα". Πρακτικά Διεθνούς Συμποσίου για το Δεσποτάτο της Ηπείρου (Άρτα, 27–31 Μαΐου 1990) [The society of Epirus in the state of Theodore Doukas] (in Greek). Arta: Μουσικοφιλολογικός Σύλλογος Άρτης «Ο Σκουφάς». pp. 313–333.
- Stavridou-Zafraka, Alkmini (2007). "Από την εκκλησιαστική οργάνωση του κράτους της Ηπείρου. Εκκλησιαστικά οφφίκια και υπηρεσίες του κλήρου τον 13ο αιώνα". Πρακτικά Β ́ Διεθνούς Αρχαιολογικού και Ιστορικού Συνεδρίου (Άρτα, 12–14 Απριλίου 2002) [From the ecclessiastical organization of the state of Epirus. Ecclesiastical offices and functions of the clergy in the 13th century] (in Greek). Arta: Μουσικοφιλολογικός Σύλλογος Άρτης «Ο Σκουφάς». pp. 161–196.
- Stavridou-Zafraka, Alkmini (2014). "Πολιτική ιδεολογία του κράτους της Ηπείρου" [Political ideology of the state of Epirus] (PDF). Vyzantiaka (in Greek). 31: 155–178. ISSN 1012-0513.
- Stiernon, Lucien (1959). "Les origines du despotat d'Épire. À propos d'un livre récent". Revue des études byzantines (in French). 17: 90–126. doi:10.3406/rebyz.1959.1200.
- Veikou, Myrto (2012). Byzantine Epirus: A Topography of Transformation – Settlements of the Seventh–Twelfth Centuries in Southern Epirus and Aetoloacarnania, Greece. Leiden: Brill.
- Zečević, Nada (2014). The Tocco of the Greek Realm: Nobility, Power and Migration in Latin Greece (14th–15th centuries). Belgrade: Makart. ISBN 9788691944100.
