= Battle of Klokotnitsa =

13th-century battle in Bulgaria

Coordinates: 41°59′N 25°30′E

- Part of the Byzantine–Bulgarian wars
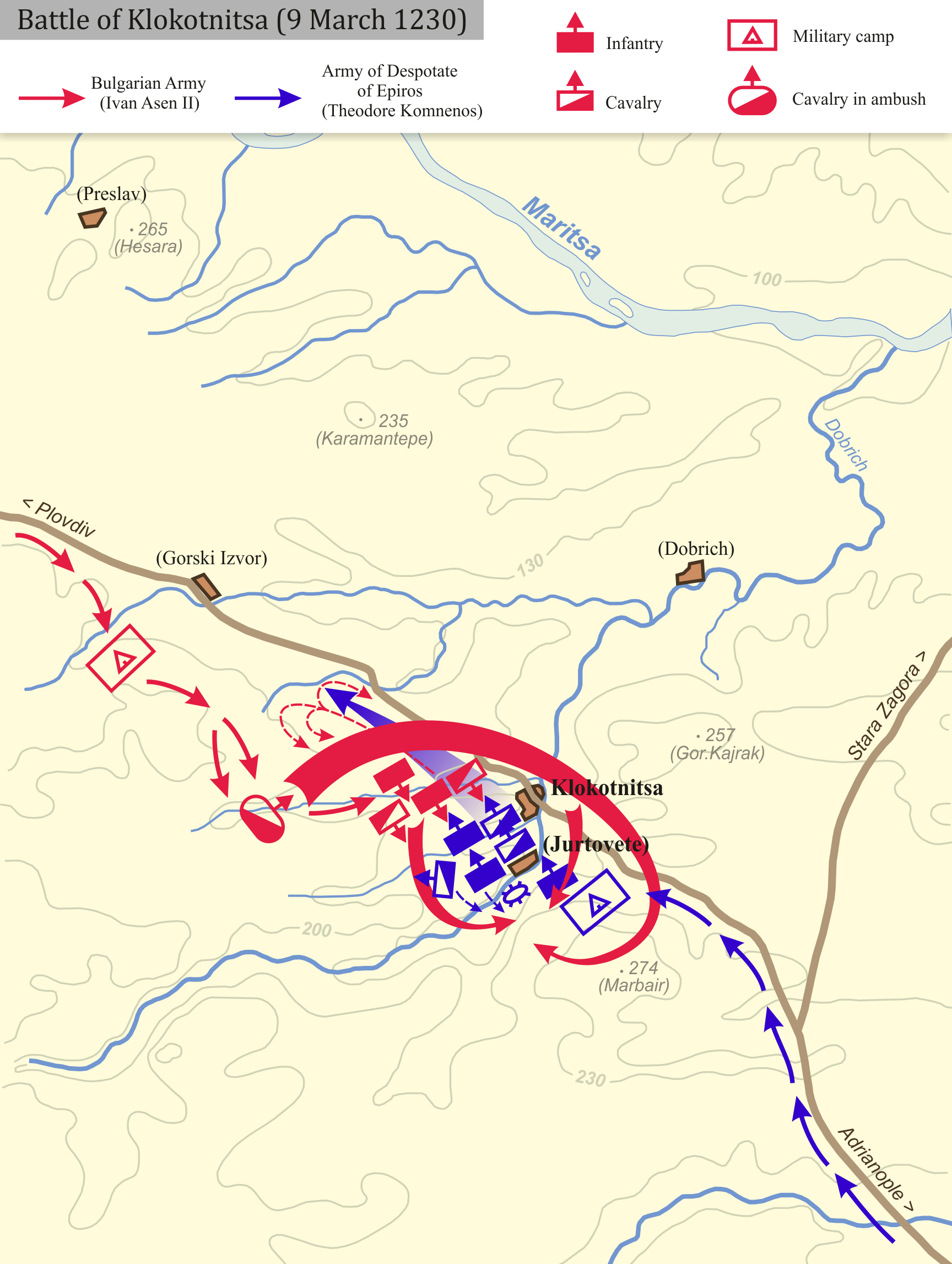
Date	9 March 1230
Location	Klokotnitsa, Bulgaria
Result	Bulgarian victory

Belligerents
Bulgarian Empire	Empire of Thessalonica

Commanders and leaders
Ivan Asen II	Theodore Komnenos Doukas (POW)

Strength
20,000 on the river bank and 1,000 Cumans in the forests Total: 21,000 men	20,000 Byzantine soldiers 2,000–4,000 German knights

Casualties and losses
Light	Moderate; Many captured and killed, but most men were allowed to return to their homelands unharmed.

The Battle of Klokotnitsa (Bulgarian: Битката при Клокотница, Bitkata pri Klokotnitsa) occurred on 9 March 1230 near the village of Klokotnitsa (today in Haskovo Province, Bulgaria) between the Second Bulgarian Empire and the Empire of Thessalonica. As a result, Bulgaria emerged once again as the most powerful state in South-Eastern Europe.

== Origins of the conflict ==
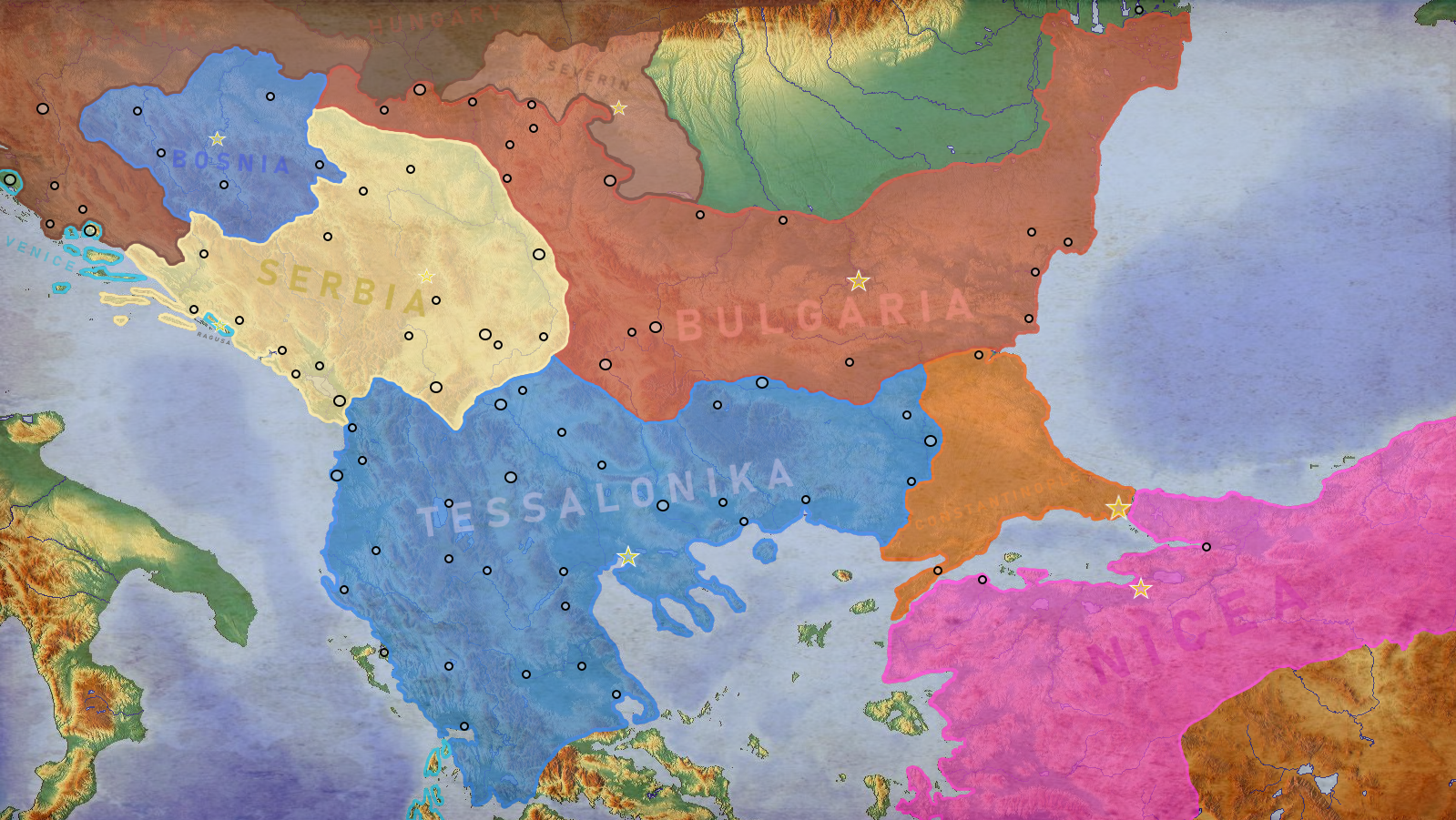
Empire of Thessalonica at its greatest extent.

Around 1221–1222 Emperor Ivan Asen II of Bulgaria made an alliance with Theodore Komnenos Doukas, the ruler of Epirus. Secured by the treaty, Theodore managed to conquer Thessalonica from the Latin Empire, as well as lands in Macedonia including Ohrid, and establish the Empire of Thessalonica. After the death of the Latin emperor Robert of Courtenay in 1228, Ivan Asen II was considered the most probable choice for regent of Baldwin II. Theodore thought that Bulgaria was the only obstacle left on his way to Constantinople and in the beginning of March 1230 he invaded the country, breaking the peace treaty and without a declaration of war.

== Battle ==
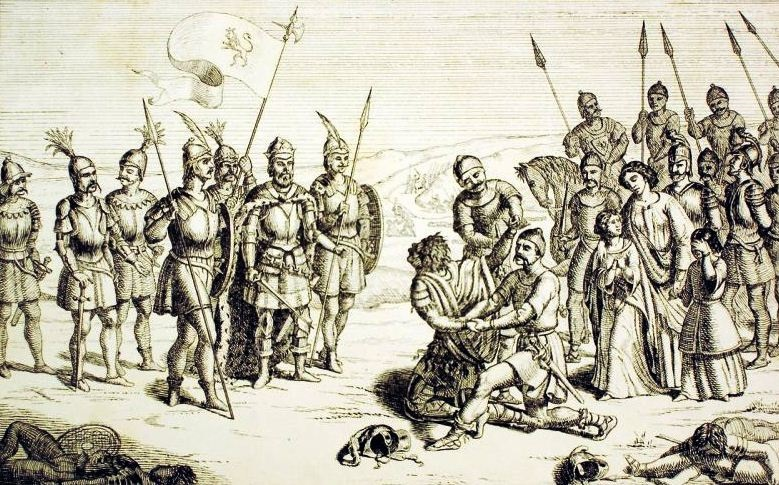
Bulgarian tsar Ivan Asen II takes Theodore Komnenos as captive, a painting by Nikolai Pavlovich

Theodore Komnenos summoned a large army, including western mercenaries. He was so confident of victory that he took the whole royal court with him, including his wife and children. His army moved slowly and plundered the villages on its way. When the Bulgarian tsar learned that the state was invaded, he gathered a small army of a few thousand men (including Cumans, that Akropolites describes as Scyths) and quickly marched southwards. In four days the Bulgarians covered a distance three times longer than Theodore's army had travelled in a week.

On 9 March, the two armies met near the village of Klokotnitsa. It is said that Ivan Asen II ordered the broken mutual protection treaty to be stuck on his spear and used as a flag. He was a good tactician and managed to surround the enemy, who were surprised to meet the Bulgarians so soon. The battle continued until sunset. Theodore's men were completely defeated, and only a small force under his brother Manuel managed to escape from the battlefield. The rest were killed in the battle or captured, including the royal court of Thessalonica and Theodore himself.

== Ivan Asen II's Tarnovo Inscription ==
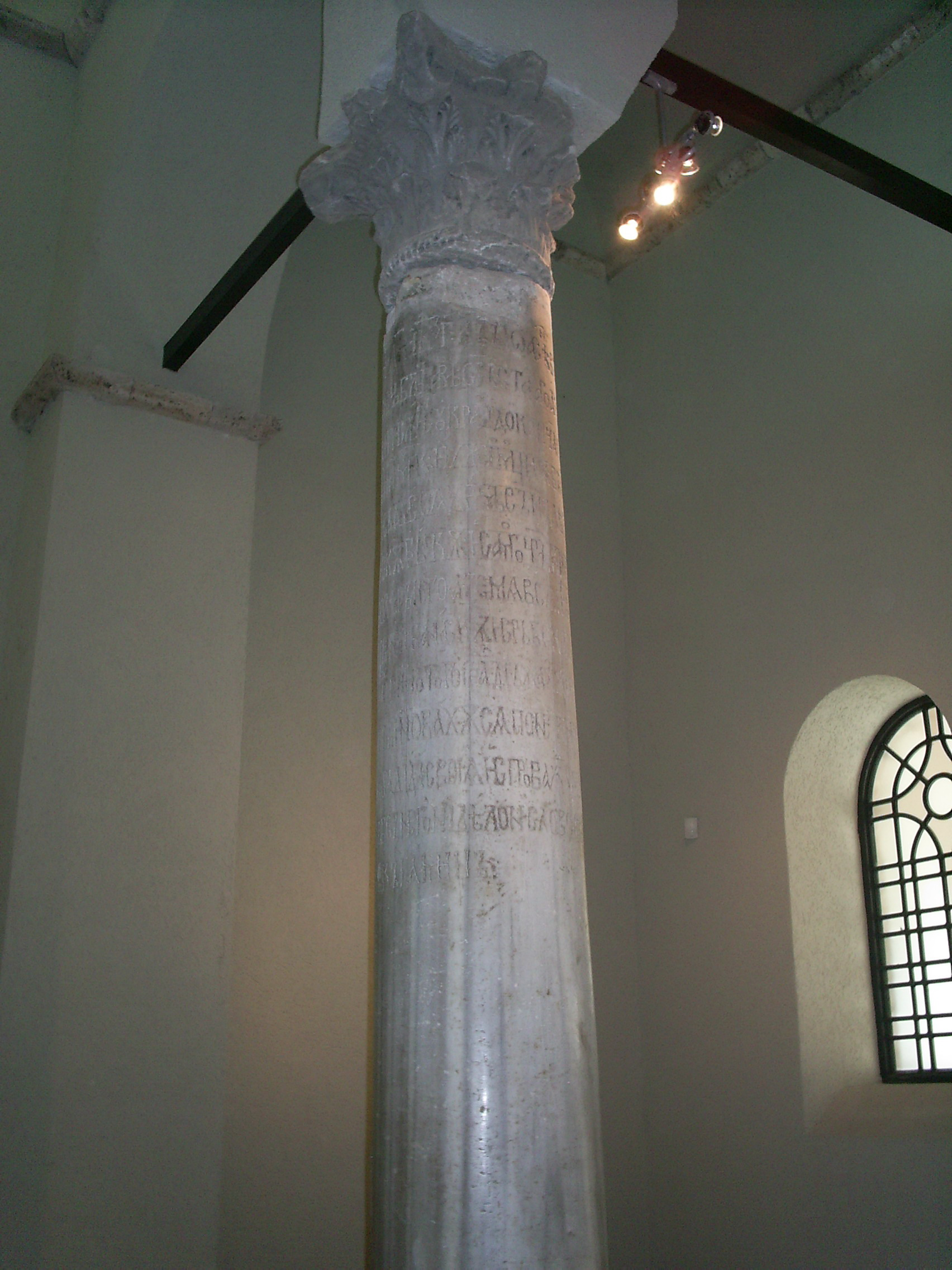
Turnovo inscription of Tsar Ivan Asen II in the Holy 40 Martyrs Church in honour of the victory at Klokotnitsa on 9 March 1230

In order to commemorate the battle, the Bulgarian emperor had an inscription carved in one of the marble columns of the Church "Holy Forty Martyrs" in the capital of the Bulgarian empire Veliko Tarnovo. Among all existing documents the text of this inscription is the most accurate evidence of the outcome and the aftermath of the battle:

"In the Year of the World 6738 (1230), third indiction. John Asen in Christ God true Tsar and sovereign of the Bulgarians, son of the old Tsar Asen, raised from the foundations and decorated with art this holy church in the name of the Holy 40 Martyrs, with the help of whom in the twelfth year of my reign when this temple was being decorated. I went to war in Romania and defeated the Greek army and captured their Tsar, Kyr Teodore Komnenos, together with all his boyars. And I conquered all of his land from Odrin (Adrianople) to Drach (Dyrrhachium), Greek and also Albanian and Serbian; and the towns around Tsarigrad and this very town were ruled by the Frazi (Latins), but they also were subjugated to my empire; because they had no other Tsar but me and thanks to me they spent their days, because God ordered this, because without Him neither a deed, nor a word is done. Glory to Him forever, Amen."

== Aftermath ==
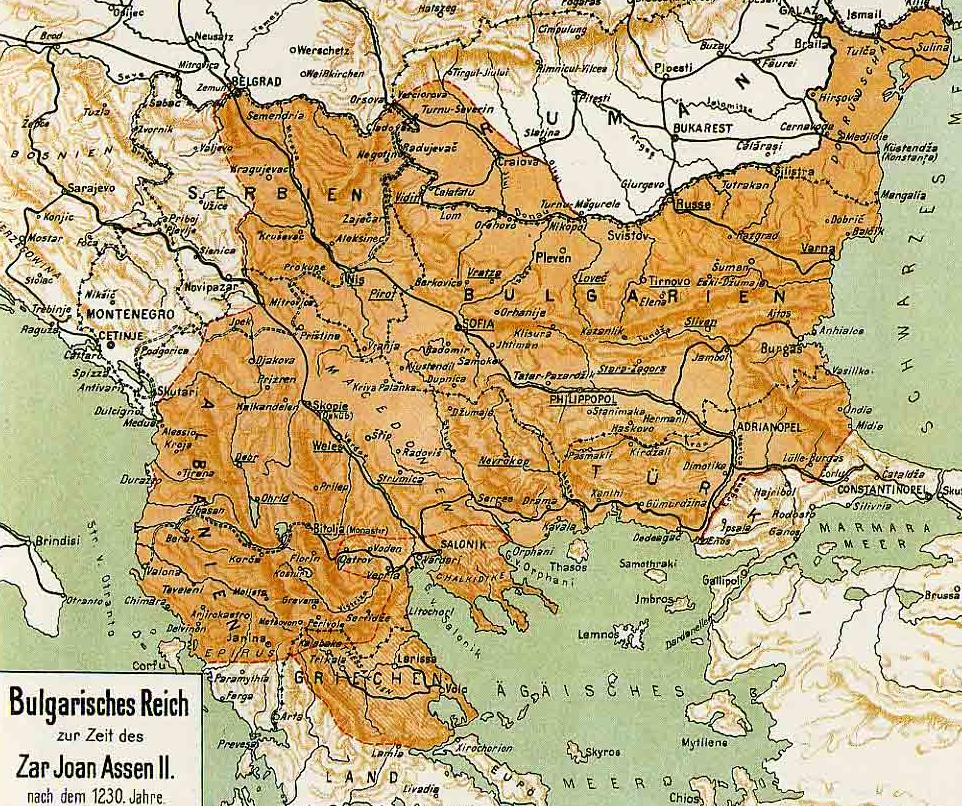
The borders of Bulgaria after the Battle of Klokotnitsa (1230)

Ivan Asen II immediately released the captured soldiers without any conditions and the nobles were taken to Tarnovo. His fame for being a merciful and just ruler went ahead of his march to the lands of Theodore Komnenos and Theodore's recently conquered territories in Thrace and Macedonia were regained by Bulgaria without resistance. Thessalonica itself became a Bulgarian vassal under Theodore's brother Manuel. However, after the passing of Ivan Asen II, the vassalage of Epirus to the Bulgarian Empire ceased and Bulgaria passed into a rapid political decline, meanwhile the Despotate of Epirus grew once more under the leadership Michael II of Epirus who reconquered many lands from the decayed Tsardom.
