= Sgouros =

Sgouros (Greek: Σγούρος/Σγουρός, also frequently found as Sguro(s) but even as Guro in some Latin texts, is the name of various notable persons and families in Byzantine and post-Byzantine Greece, attested from 12th century.

== Etymology ==
The word sgouros means "curly-haired" in medieval Greek and is of uncertain etymology. According to Adamantios Korais the etymology is from the Greek word gyros (round).

== Notable persons bearing the name ==
Surname

- Theodore Sgouros, governor of Argos and Nafplio, late 12th century
- Leo Sgouros, son of Theodore, autonomous ruler of the NE Peloponnese and Central Greece, early 13th century
- Gabriel Sgouros, brother and successor of Leo, surrendered Nafplio to the Crusaders (1212).
- George A. Sgouros, Inventor, Industrial & Graphic Designer, Photographer, Independent Candidate for Mayor of Roanoke City, VA (2004 & 2008).
- Sgouros, of unknown other name. Participated in the siege of Constantinople (1453) as naval commander, evacuating Christians with his ship.
- Progonos Sgouros (fl. 1294–1300), an Albanian Byzantine noble, member of the Skuraj family. Benefactor of churches and monasteries in Macedonia.
- Dimitris Sgouros (born 1969), Greek classical pianist
- Angelo Sgouros (born 1977), Greek / American musical producer and recording artist.
- Yiannis Sgouros, Greek politician

Given name

- Sgouros Spata (fl. 1400–1403), Albanian lord

== Modern usage ==
The name is used as surname in modern Greece, also with derivatives such as Sgouras, Sgouropoulos, Sgourakis, Sgourides, Sgouris etc.
