= Anna Komnene Angelina =

Empress of Nicaea

- Augusta

Empress consort of Nicaea
- Tenure: 1205–1212
- Born: c. 1176
- Died: 1212
- Spouses: Isaac Komnenos; Theodore I Laskaris
- Issue: Theodora Angelina; Nicholas Laskaris; John Laskaris; Irene Laskarina; Maria Laskarina; Eudokia Laskarina
- Dynasty: Angelos
- Father: Alexios III Angelos
- Mother: Euphrosyne Doukaina Kamatera

Anna Komnene Angelina or Comnena Angelina (Greek: Άννα Κομνηνή Αγγελίνα; c. 1176 – 1212) (not to be confused with Anna Komnene) was Empress consort of Nicaea. She was the daughter of emperor Alexios III Angelos and Euphrosyne Doukaina Kamatera.

== Life ==
Her first marriage was to the sebastokratōr Isaac Komnenos Vatatzes, a great-nephew of the emperor Manuel I Komnenos. They had one daughter, Theodora Angelina. Soon after Anna's father became emperor, in 1195, Isaac Komnenos was dispatched to combat the Uprising of Asen and Peter. He was captured, became a pawn between rival Bulgarian and Vlach factions, and died while imprisoned.

Theodora, the young daughter of Anna, was betrothed to the Bulgarian boyar Ivanko with the blessings of her grandfather Alexios III, who considered Ivanko a worthy potential son-in-law. However, the emperor postponed the marriage for a more suitable time, as Theodora still spoke like a child. According to the historian Niketas Choniates, Ivanko, noticing that his betrothed was very young, “fixed his gaze upon her rosy-cheeked mother,” Anna, who was then a widow. Allegedly envisioning a more splendid union, he is said to have told the emperor: "Why give me a little lamb, when I seek a full-grown goat?" Nevertheless, the imperial family did not agree to this proposal.

Her second marriage to Theodore Laskaris, future emperor of Nicaea, was celebrated in a double wedding in late 1199/early 1200 (the other couple was Anna's sister Irene and Alexios Palaiologos).

The armies of the Fourth Crusade reached to Constantinople in 1203. Following the flight of Alexios III and the accession of Alexios IV Angelos to the throne (along his father Isaac II Angelos) with the support of the Crusaders, Theodore Laskaris was captured and imprisoned due to his status as the son-in-law of Alexios III. His wife, Anna, and his mother-in-law, Euphrosyne Doukaina Kamatera, were also detained. However, in the autumn of 1203, Theodore, together with Anna and their three daughters, managed to escape to Asia Minor, reaching Bithynia by passing through the Frankish encampment.

In 1205, Theodore Laskaris became emperor of Nicaea. At the begging of Theodore's campaign in Asia Minor the inhabitants of Nicaea initially refused to accept Laskaris as their overlord. Instead he proposed that they receive only Anna. In this way, Anna would effectively become a hostage, serving as a demonstration of Laskaris’s good intentions. Eventually, the city of Nicaea did open its gates to Theodore, a decision that was likely influenced by the diplomatic efforts of Princess Anna during her time within the city.

According to George Akropolites, the Seljuk Sultan Kaykhusraw regarded Anna as his sister. This perceived sibling relationship likely stemmed from his baptism in Constantinople by Emperor Alexios III, which created a spiritual bond between Kaykhusraw and the daughters of Alexios. As a result, Anna played a significant role in forging an early alliance between Theodore I Laskaris and the Seljuk Sultan at a critical moment for the consolidation and survival of the Nicaean state. An alliance that lasted until 1210.

In the spring of 1208, following deliberations with the Empire of Nicaea, a supplicatory letter (deetērion) was sent by the inhabitants of Constantinople to Theodore I Laskaris. In this petition, the Constantinopolitans addressed Laskaris and expressed their recognition of his authority. A similar letter was sent simultaneously to Anna Angelina, whom they referred to as Augusta and daughter of Alexios III.

Around 1208- 1209, Theodore Laskaris ordered that all subjects of his realm swear an oath of allegiance to his authority and to the imperial family. The Church of Nicaea, led by Patriarch Michael IV Autoreianos, committed itself through a formal decree (tomos), proclaiming its loyalty to Emperor Theodore and his son, Nicholas Laskaris. The decree also explicitly affirmed allegiance to Empress Anna, whom it referred to as Kyria and Despoina (lady and mistress). While in rhetorical texts, she is referred to as the Holy Lady (Hagia Despoina).

Following the suicide of Leo Sgouros at Acrocorinth around 1207/1208, Anna offered asylum to her sister Eudokia Angelina, who fled to Asia Minor.

Anna Angelina Komnene died in 1212. She was buried at the Monastery of Hyakinthos, in the Church of the Dormition of the Theotokos, where her father, Alexios III Angelos, was also interred. After his death in 1221, Theodore I Laskaris, at the age of approximately 45 to 50, chose to be buried beside his first wife at the same monastery.

== Issue ==
Anna and Isaac had one daughter:

- Theodora Angelina, betrothed to Ivanko, Dobromir Chrysos, and finally Leopold VI, Duke of Austria.

Anna and Theodore had three daughters and two short-lived sons:

- Nicholas Laskaris (died c. 1212)
- John Laskaris (died c. 1212)
- Irene Doukaina Komnene Laskarina, who married first the general Andronikos Palaiologos and then John III Doukas Vatatzes
- Maria Laskarina, who married King Béla IV of Hungary
- Eudokia Laskarina, engaged to Robert I, Latin Emperor, married firstly and divorced Frederick II, Duke of Austria, secondly (bef. 1230) Anseau de Cayeux, Governor of Asia Minor

== Sources ==
- Varzos, Konstantinos (1984). Η Γενεαλογία των Κομνηνών [The Genealogy of the Komnenoi] (PDF) (in Greek). Vol. B. Thessaloniki: Centre for Byzantine Studies, University of Thessaloniki.
- Choniates, Nicetas (1984). O City of Byzantium, Annals of Niketas Choniatēs. Translated by Harry J. Magoulias. Detroit: Wayne State University Press. ISBN 0-8143-1764-2., pages 259, 274, and 280.
- Angold, Michael (2011). "The Latin Empire of Constantinople, 1204–1261: Marriage Strategies". Identities and Allegiances in the Eastern Mediterranean after 1204. Farnham: Ashgate Publishing Limited. pp. 47–68. ISBN 9781409410980.
- Ostrogorsky, George (1956). History of the Byzantine State. Oxford: Basil Blackwell.

Anna Komnene Angelina Angelos Born: c. 1176 Died: 1212
Royal titles
Preceded by Margaret of Hungary	Empress consort of Nicaea; 1204–1212	Succeeded by Philippa of Armenia
