= Kamytzes =

Byzantine aristocratic lineage

The Kamytzes family (Greek: Καμύτζης, plural Καμύτζαι, Kamytzai) was a Byzantine aristocratic lineage that first appeared in the late 11th century, and was prominent in the late 12th century.

== Etymology ==
The etymology of the family's name is unclear: the scholar Nikos A. Bees suggested an origin from the Greek kammyo, "close to the eyes", a theory which Alexander Kazhdan doesn't deny, but he also notes that the name could be of Turkish origin as well. According to Ioannis Leontiadis, Alexandra-Kyriaki Wassiliou-Seibt and Andreas Gkoutzioukostas, the proper name Kammytsis derives from the verb kammyo/kammyzo and the suffix -itzis/-itsis, rejecting a Turkish origin for the name.

== Origin ==
Historian Paul Gautier specifically associated the family with the Turkish mercenary commander Kamyres, who entered Byzantine service in 1083. This theory has been accepted by several historians. Charles M. Brand, however, noted that the reading of Kamytzes for Kamyres is insufficient to prove a Turkish origin of the family. Indeed, several other historians and Byzantinologists have challenged Gautier's assertions, concluding that the mercenary leader Kamyres was not related to the Kamytzes, and that the family was not of Turkish, but of Greek origin.

The existence of a lead seal dated to 1050, of the strategos (general) and protospatharios epi tou Chrysotriklinou Theodore Kamytzes, would appear to preclude both descent from Kamyres and the probability of Turkish ancestry.

== History ==
The first prominent member of the family was Eustathios Kamytzes in 1094, who later became doux of Nicaea. Gautier considered him either to be Kamyres himself or a son or nephew, although this has been disputed, and negated by the evidence of a lead seal of Theodore Kamytzes dating to the mid 11th century. The most famous member of the family was the general Manuel Kamytzes, a son of Constantine Kamytzes and Maria Komnene. Through his mother, Manuel was connected to both the Komnenos dynasty as well as the later Angelos emperors, under whom he served. When Alexios III Angelos refused to ransom him from captivity, Manuel Kamytzes launched an unsuccessful uprising together with his son-in-law Dobromir Chrysos. The fate of the family is obscure thereafter: the Partitio Romaniae indicates that they were among the Empire's biggest land-owners, and the late 13th-century historian George Pachymeres included them among the high nobility who tried to gain influence after the death of Theodore II Laskaris in 1258, but few notable members are known, apart perhaps from a George Kammytzoboukes, who served as doux of the Thracesian Theme in 1241.

During the Palaiologan period, the family name still occurs, but in a non-aristocratic context. A member of the family is attested as a landowner in Cephallonia in 1264, a Kamytzes who resided in Thessalonica around 1361 was involved in improper inheritance of sums from the Docheiariou monastery, while a Manuel Kamytzes was a priest who had been suspended and was restored to the priesthood in 1394.

== Sources ==
- Gkoutzioukostas, Andreas; Wassiliou-Seibt, Alexandra-Kyriaki (2018). "The Origin and the Members of the Kamytzes Family. A Contribution to Byzantine Prosopography". Dumbarton Oaks Papers. 72: 169–180. JSTOR 26892568.
- Kazhdan, Alexander (1991). "Kamytzes". In Kazhdan, Alexander (ed.). The Oxford Dictionary of Byzantium. Oxford and New York: Oxford University Press. pp. 1099–1100. ISBN 0-19-504652-8.
- Trapp, Erich; Beyer, Hans-Veit; Walther, Rainer; Sturm-Schnabl, Katja; Kislinger, Ewald; Leontiadis, Ioannis; Kaplaneres, Sokrates (1976–1996). Prosopographisches Lexikon der Palaiologenzeit (in German). Vienna: Verlag der Österreichischen Akademie der Wissenschaften. ISBN 3-7001-3003-1.
