= Skuraj family =

Noble family from Albania

Skura Skurajt
- Noble family
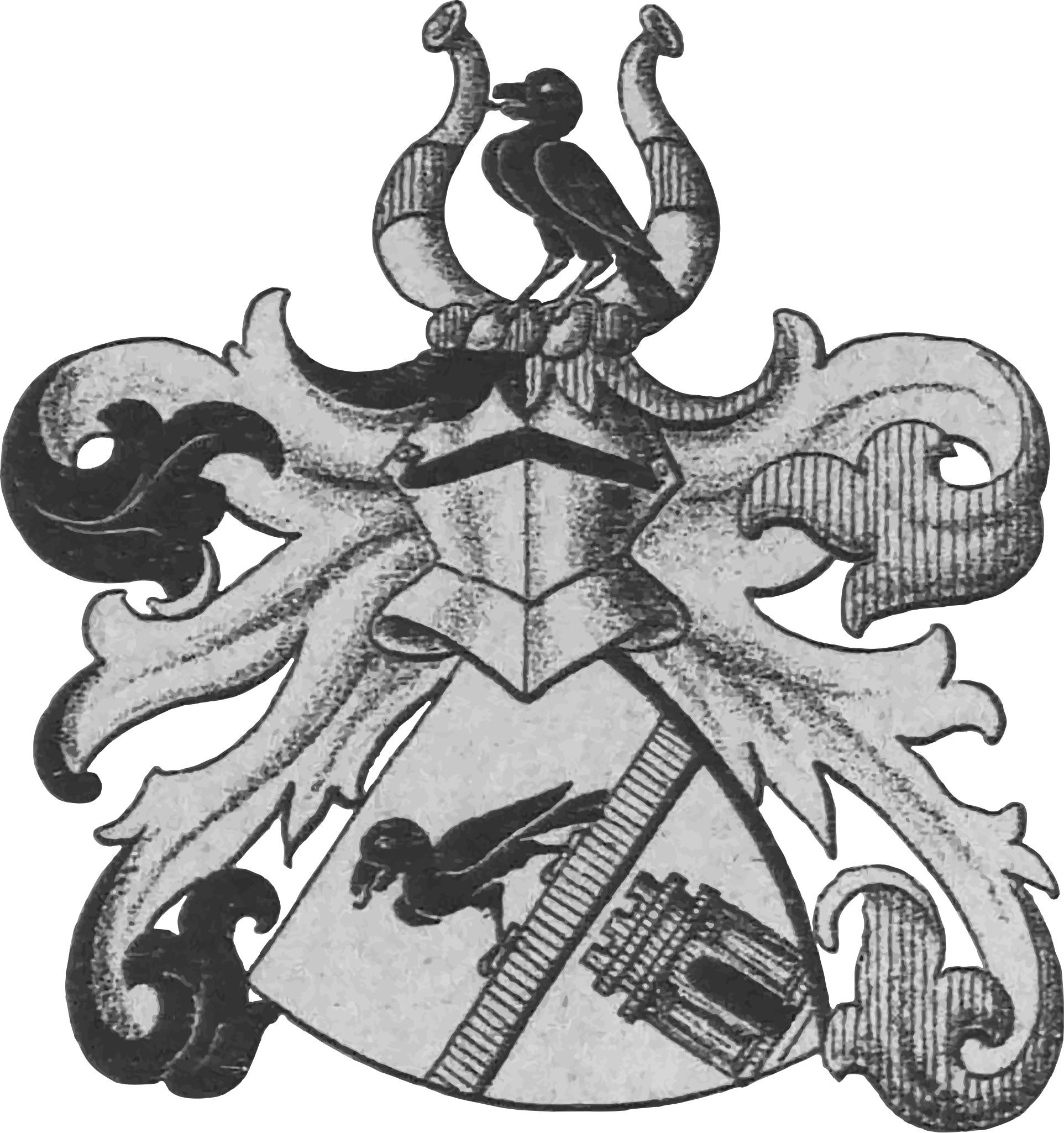
- Model no.1 The coats of arms of the Skura are depicted in Friedrich Heyer von Rosenfeld's "Wappenbuch des Königreichs Dalmatien", published in 1873.

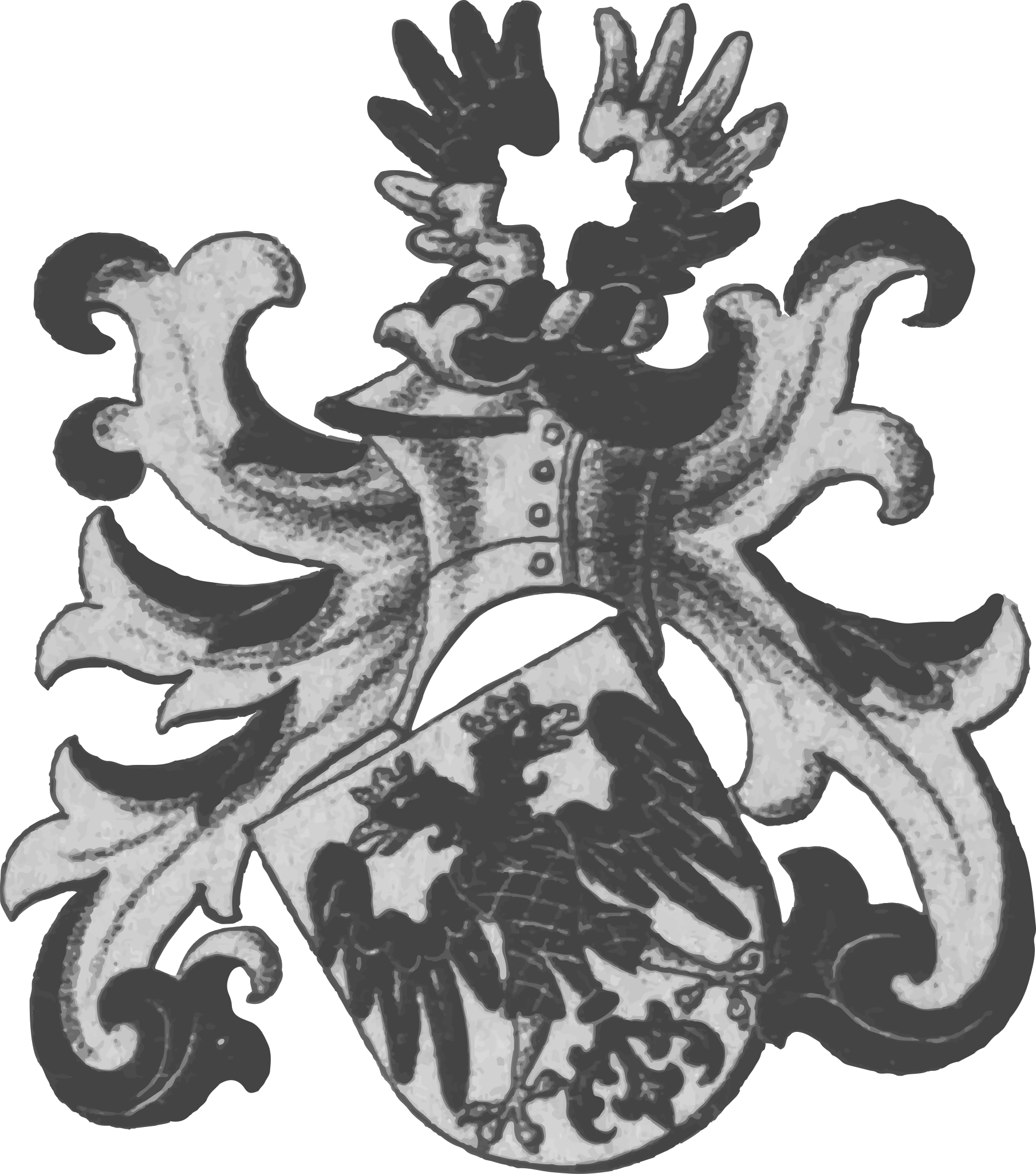
- Model no.2
- Country: Medieval Albania
- Current region: Benda
- Founded: 13th century
- Members: Gjergj Skura; Pepe Skura; Pjetër Skura; Mihal Skura; Progon Skura
- Different spellings of the name include Scura, Schura, Schuro, Sguro, Scuro, Sgurous, Zguro and Zguraj.

The Skura (also, Skuraj, Skurraj, Skurra, Scura, Sgouros, Ozgur, Uzgur, Zguro ) were a medieval Albanian feudal family centred around the historical and ethnographic region of Benda in the highlands north-east of modern Tirana, central Albania. They were among the Albanian families that rose to prominence in the Theme of Dyrrhachium and reached high military-administrative ranks within the Byzantine state apparatus. On top of their relations with the Byzantine Empire and other members of the local Albanian nobility, the Skura were also closely involved with other prominent powers in the region, such as the Angevin Kingdom of Albania and the Ottoman Empire.

== History ==
Among the earliest attestations of the Skura are from the thirteenth century. A familial tomb dated back to the year 1201, located in a church dedicated to Saint Mary in the village of Brrar north-east of Tirana, has been identified as that of the sebastos Mihal Skura who had died in the same year. His title and monument alludes to the high rank and status held by the Skura during the period. The tomb was excavated in 1980 by the archaeologists Aleksandër Meksi and Damian Komata, who noted that the frontal part of the tomb was decorated with an arcade of five arches, each of which had a Latin cross underneath them. They also noted that an equal-armed cross of the Byzantine style was engraved at the front of the tomb inscription which itself was written in both Medieval Greek and Latin, indicating that the family was influenced by both the Roman Catholic and Byzantine churches. The Latin crosses may specifically reflect the shift away from Byzantine Eastern Orthodox influence and jurisdiction, propagated by the Principality of Arbanon, and a growing identification or allegiance to the Roman Church. The tomb inscription was also transcribed by the team as: +ΜΝΗΣΘΗΤΙ ΚΥΡΙΕ ΤΟΝ ΔΟΥΛΟΝ ΣΟΥ ΜΙΧΑΗΛ ΣΕΒΑΣΤΟΝ ΤΟΝ ΣΑΟΥΡΟΝ ΑΜΑ ΣΥΜΒΙΩ ΚΑΙ ΤΕΚΝΟΙΣ OR(E)SUAETCUMFILI(I)SSUISMEMENTOD (OMI) NEFAMULOTUOMICHALESVASTOSGVRUMCUMUX (Remember, Lord your servant, thy sevast Mihal Skura with his wife and children. Year 6790)

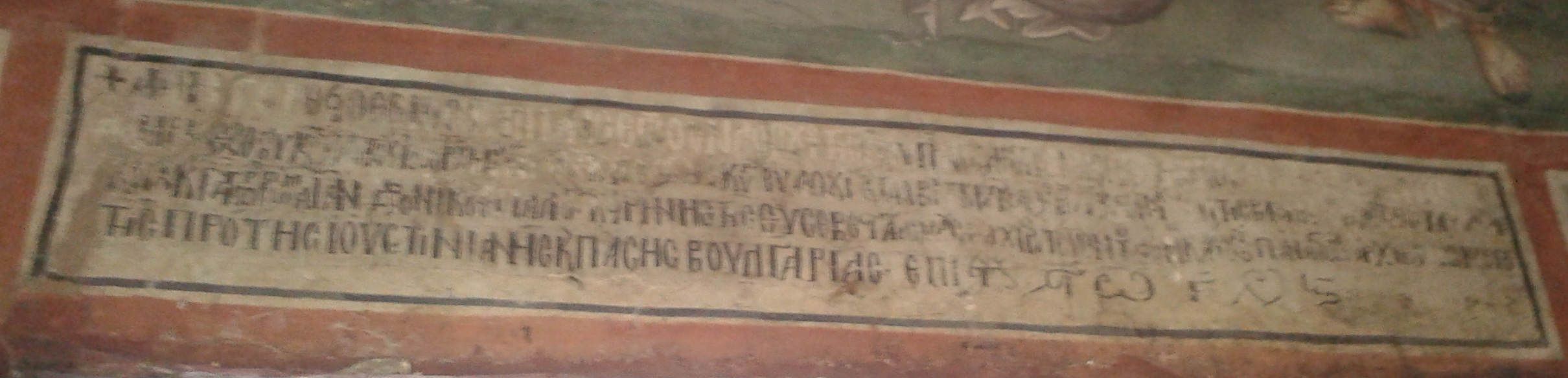
Inscription in Greek mentioning Progonos Sguros and his wife Eudokia, a female relative of the Byzantine emperor.

Later in 1295, another scion of the Skura family, Progonos Sgouros (Progon Skura) from Dyrrhachium, is mentioned in an inscription from the church of Saint Clement of Ohrid as its founder. Progon himself was also the lord (megas eteriarchos) of Ohrid responsible for halting the military expansion of Stefan Milutin into the region and was married to a certain Eudokia who was the relative of the emperor Andronikos II Palaiologos.

The Skura appear again in an Angevin document of 1274 where three nobles of the Skura family appear among the Albanian nobles who had reached an agreement with Charles I of Anjou: the savasto Maurus Scura, Zacharias Scura, and Georgius Scura. To further cement their positive relations and ties with the Angevins, the Skura, alongside other Albanian nobles, submitted to Philip I of Taranto in 1304 and became vassals.

Branches of the Skura were also present in northern Albania and had reached the city of Lezhë in north-western Albania by the fourteenth century, where the family heraldic emblem of the scion Antonio Skura was discovered in his tombstone in Kodër Marlekaj. The emblem depicts a lion standing on its hind legs holding a lily on the right corner. There are also two hanging cords with lilies at the ends and a partially destroyed inscription in Latin.

Later, in a document of 1469, a certain Vucho Scura is recorded as the leader of the highland territory of Benda near the citadel of Krujë (voyvode montanee Bende super Croyam).

Following the Ottoman conquest of Albania, branches of the Skura were incorporated into the Ottoman state system and converted to Islam. Richard F. Kreutel argues that a certain Uzguroğlu ("son of Skura") Mehmed Bey was responsible for the Ottoman conquest of Durrës in 1501 and that he had served in campaigns around Modon and Koroni in the previous year. However, other academics have asserted that a descendant of the Evrenosoğlu was responsible for the conquest. It is possible that this Mehmed Bey was the same individual, or a relative, responsible for aiding in the reconstruction of the Lezhë Castle in 1522 and the founding of the Lead Mosque in Berat. An Isa Bey from the Skura also obtained the position of beylerbey of Anatolia.

== Connection to the Progoni family ==
It has been theorised by some Albanian historians that the Progoni family that ruled over the Principality of Arbanon were a branch of the Skura. This position bases itself on the fact that both families maintained marital ties with the Byzantine dynasties, specifically the Angeloi. While Leo Sgouros married Eudokia Angelina, daughter of Alexios III Angelos, Demetrio Progoni married Eudokia's daughter via her earlier marriage with Stefan Nemanjić, Komnena Nemanjić. Their relative, Progon Skura, was also married to a relative of Andronikos II Palaiologos. It is then argued that matrimonial ties with the emperor were reserved to special important families from the Byzantine provinces and that the Albanian Skura were among those few which held such ties.

== Connection to the Sgouros family of the Peloponnese ==
According to Xhufi, another member of this family – attested during the thirteenth century – was Leo Sgouros, who served as the strategos of Corinth and Nafplio in the Peloponnese, and was the son-in-law of Byzantine emperor Alexios III Angelos via his marriage to Eudokia Angelina in 1203. Vlachopoulou writes that this view is based on the corruption of the original Sgourós/Sgoúros into Skoúros, Skoúras, Skýros, which is first observed in the 13th century, and mainly in the 14th and 15th centuries. She adds that this view is problematic, since the Sgouros family first appeared in the eleventh century, and particularly in areas that don't attest any Albanian presence until centuries later. According to her, it's more probable that members of the Sgouros family intermarried with various Albanian houses during the 14th and 15th centuries, which is the time that the latter migrated to various parts of Greece.
