= Stefan Milutin's invasion of Northern Albania =

Invasion during the Middle Ages

- Part of the Byzantine–Serbian wars
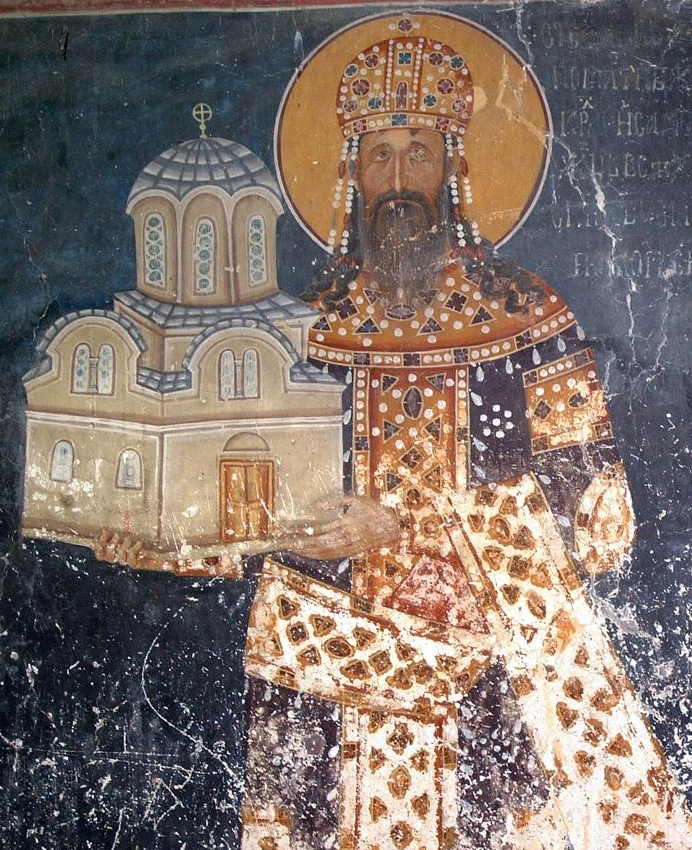
- Frescoe of Stefan Milutin in the Studenica monastery (c.1314)
Date	1296 – 1299
Location	Northern Albania
Result	Serbian victory
Territorial changes	Kingdom of Serbia annexes the lands north of Durrës and Durrës while Ohrid remained under Albanian–Byzantine rule.

Belligerents
Albanian nobility; Skuraj family; Byzantine Empire	Kingdom of Serbia

Commanders and leaders
Progonos Sgouros	Stefan Milutin

Stefan Milutin's invasion of Northern Albania was a conflict during the Middle Ages between the Kingdom of Serbia and Albanian nobility serving under the Byzantine Empire. The war began in 1296 when the Serbian army under King Stefan Milutin began a campaign with the goal of capturing the Mat–Ohrid line. The war ended in 1299, when peace was achieved between the Serbian Kingdom and the Byzantines.

== Background ==
During the 13th century, the Byzantine Empire began to lose control and influence over Albania. Despite the defeat of the Angevin Kingdom of Albania at Berat in 1281, most of the Albanian coast remained under Angevin control, while in the inland several nobles began establishing their own sovereign states.

Alternatively, since the start of the rule of Stefan Milutin in 1282, the Kingdom of Serbia had enjoyed a period of expansion across the Balkans. Milutin aimed to conquer the regions of Albania and Thessaly to spread his influence. Many lands in Albania, particularly in its Northern region, such as Shkodër, Drivasto and Dajç were already under Serbian control due to the campaigns of Stefan Nemanja.

== Conflict ==
In 1296, the Serbian army under Stefan Milutin attacked Northern Albania with the goal of capturing the strategic Mat-Ohrid line. The capture of the line gave Milutin an easier passage to Durrës which he would attack the same year. The Serbian army engaged with the Byzantine–Albanian force in Durrës, with the battle ending in a triumph for the Kingdom of Serbia. In the following years after the Battle of Durrës, Milutin would lead a campaign towards Ohrid, however his advance was brought to a halt after being confronted by a Byzantine–Albanian army commanded by general Progonos Sgouros of the Skuraj family. The two armies met somewhere in between Ohrid and Tetovo. After heavy fighting the battle ended in a victory for the Albanian noble, forcing Milutin to retreat.

The first attempts to make peace occurred in 1298, when Milutin defeated a Byzantine army in battle. Emperor Andronikos II Palaiologos offered his sister Eudokia's hand in marriage to Milutin, however he would not accept. Fighting continued until the Spring of 1299, when Milutin accepted to marry the daughter of Andronikos II, Simonida. The marriage led to him gaining the Mat-Ohrid line and the territory north of Durrës as dowry from his wife. Despite this, Milutin was forced to withdraw from Durrës and failed to capture Ohrid. Some sources state that Durrës remained under Serbian control until 1304, when it was given back to the Byzantines by Milutin.

Serbian expansion into Albania and Macedonia in 1299

== Aftermath ==
Despite the armistice reached in 1299, Serbian incursions into the vicinity of Durrës and Southern Mat would continue until 1304. The same year the Albanian noble families would reform their alliances with the Angevins. The Serbian expansion into Albania interfered with the interests of the Angevins, who had lost influence in the region.

The invasion of Albania also happened simultaneously with an invasion in Macedonia which led to Milutin capturing the lands north of Štip.

In 1318, threatened by the Serbian expansion, Philip II and Pope John XXII instigated an open Albanian revolt commanded by Andrea I Muzaka. Despite heavy resistance, the revolt was crushed.

== Sources ==
=== Bibliography ===
- Fine, John V. A. (1994). The Late Medieval Balkans: A Critical Survey from the Late Twelfth Century to the Ottoman Conquest. University of Michigan Press. ISBN 978-0-472-08260-5.
- Anamali, Skënder (2002). Historia e popullit shqiptar I, Mesjeta [The history of the Albanian people I, Middle ages]. Toena. ISBN 9789992716229. OCLC 52411919.
- Madgearu, Alexandru; Gordon, Martin (2008). The Wars of the Balkan Peninsula: Their Medieval Origins. Bloomsbury. ISBN 9780810858466.
- Kazhdan, Alexander (1991). Oxford Dictionary of Byzantium. Oxford University Press. p. 1901. ISBN 978-0-19-504652-6.

=== Websites ===
- Uzelac, Aleksandar (2015). "Under the Shadow of the Dog - Tatars and South Slavic Lands in the Second Half of the Thirteenth Century, Utopia". academia.edu (in Serbian). Belgrade.
