= Eustathios Kamytzes =

Byzantine general and administrator

- Born: 11th century
- Died: after 1118, before 1136
- Military career
- Allegiance: Byzantine Empire
- Rank: strategos (1098), doux (1113)

Eustathios Kamytzes (Greek: Εὐστάθιος Καμύτζης; fl. 1083 – after 1118) was a high-ranking military commander and provincial governor of Byzantine emperor Alexios I Komnenos. He notably served as the doux of Nicaea during the war against the Seljuk Turks, and was given the court title of sebastos, indicating close association with the imperial family.

== Life ==
The Kamytzes family were prominent landowners in the Meander Valley in western Anatolia. The first evidence of the family is an extant lead seal of the strategos (general) and protospatharios epi tou Chrysotriklinou Theodore Kamytzes, dating to 1030–1050.

Eustathios Kamytzes was a high-ranking officer, close to emperor Alexios I Komnenos. Anna Komnene, the daughter of Alexios, mentioned him in the biographical work Alexiad, and described him as a large and heavy man. He was active in both the west and east of the empire. It is believed he was first mentioned in 1083 as the commander of a Turkic mercenary battalion of 7,000 men.

In 1091–1092, Kamytzes participated in the conspiracy of Gregorios Gabras, the son of doux of Trebizond, Theodore Gabras, helping Gregorios escape from Constantinople. The conspirators were captured and imprisoned. Kamytzes was eventually pardoned, and lived in exile for a short time, then regained the trust of the emperor. In 1094 he attended the Council of Constantinople, at which time he held the titles of proedros (a court title) and the office of chartoularios tou stavlou (stud farm supervisor). He was further elevated to nobelissimos and protonobelissimos under Alexios.

Kamytzes campaigned in the east and was in 1098 made a strategos (general) of Lampe by megas doux John Doukas, the brother-in-law of Alexios I. In 1108 he participated in operations against the Siculo-Norman invaders of Epirus, and was defeated while defending the mountain pass of Arbanon against Guy of Hauteville, the brother of Bohemond I of Antioch. This event is the only instance noted in the Alexiad of Kamytzes activity in the Balkans, although his seal was found at the frontier fortress of Stari Ras towards Serbia.

In 1113, Kamytzes is mentioned as the doux (military governor) of Nicaea. He may have served as the doux of Cyprus prior to this. In 1113 at Nicaea, he was captured while defending against a campaign by the Seljuk Turks, after most of the army had fled and he himself stood and fought off assailants with his back against an oak tree. A Turkish commander persuaded him to surrender, but he managed to escape when his captors were attacked by another Byzantine force. Kamytzes then joined the army of the Emperor at Damalis, and was sent back to Constantinople. He was again sent to Asia Minor in 1116, as part of Alexios' last campaign against the Anatolian Turks.

Kamytzes probably survived Alexios I (d. 1118), and was mentioned as dead by 1136. He was given the high court title of sebastos, which implies a close association with the imperial family, possibly in recognition of his military services in Anatolia, by Alexios' son, emperor John II. John II ordered that the name of Eustathios Kamytzes be commemorated in the church liturgy on the Saturdays of Meatfare, Cheesefare, and Pentecost.

== Family ==
Little direct evidence of the immediate family of Eustathios Kamytzes has survived. However a probable son, Constantine Kamytzes, sealed his family's place in the highest echelons of Byzantine aristocracy through his marriage to Maria Angelina Komnene, daughter of Constantine Angelos and the purple-born princess Theodora Komnene, and thus a niece of John II.

== Seal ==
The seal of protonobelissimos Eustathios Kamytzes was found at Stari Ras (a fortress in southwestern Serbia), dating to c. 1100. It was offered on auction at Gorny & Mosch in 2011. It depicts the Virgin Hagiosoritissa on the obverse, and weighs 16,53 grams.

== Sources ==
- Gkoutzioukostas, Andreas; Wassiliou-Seibt, Alexandra-Kyriaki (2018). "The Origin and the Members of the Kamytzes Family. A Contribution to Byzantine Prosopography". Dumbarton Oaks Papers. 72: 169–180. JSTOR 26892568.
- Ivanišević, Vujadin; Krsmanović, Bojana (2013). "Byzantine seals from the Ras fortress" (PDF). Recueil des travaux de l'Institut d'études byzantines. 50 (1): 449–460. doi:10.2298/ZRVI1350449I. "№ 3. The seal of protonobelissimos Eustathios Kamytzes"
- Komnene, Anna (1969). The Alexiad of Anna Comnena. Translated by Sewter, Edgar Robert Ashton. Penguin Classics, London. ISBN 0-14-044215-4.

Preceded by ?	Doux of Nicaea; 1113	Succeeded by ?
