= Sgouros family =

Byzantine Greek family

The Sgouros (Medieval Greek: Σγουρός), also known as Sgouropoulos (Σγουρόπουλος), Sgouromallaios (Σγουρομαλλαίος), Sgouranos (Σγουρανός), Sgouris (Σγουρής), Sgourismenos (Σγουρισμένος), Sgouritzis (Σγουρίτζης), and Sgourogiannis (Σγουρογιάννης), was a Byzantine Greek noble family – composed of multiple branches – that originated from Nafplio.

== Name ==
The name of the family derives from the Greek adjective sgourós (σγουρός), which is indicative of wavy hair. According to linguist and philologist Georgios Babiniotis, the adjective sgourós derives either from Ancient Greek gurós (γυρός) 'curved, round' with the introduction of the prefix σ-, or from the noun svoúros (σβούρος), which might have been detached from svouró-mallos (σβουρό-μαλλος).

== History ==
The Sgouros family was a rich and powerful family, which first appeared in the middle of the 11th c. in Nafplio. From the very beginning right until the 15th c., it was part of the Byzantine provincial middle class. Members of the family appear to hold both political and ecclesiastical positions, and they were also distinguished as scholars, scribes, orators, etc. The Byzantinist Alexander Kazhdan, who was a notable scholar of mid-Byzantine and late Byzantine society, identified twelve representatives of the family during the reign of Alexios I Komnenos (1081-1118). With the appearance of the most prominent Sgouroi at the end of the 12th and beginning of the 13th centuries (Theodoros and Leon), the family arranged marriages with the noble family of Angeloi.

Although many Sgouroi were distinguished in public administrative positions from the time of Alexios I Komnenos, they never seem to have been members of the aristocratic court in Constantinople. Some of the most important positions held by the recorded members – mainly from 1086/1088 AD and thereafter – were those of the protospatharios, sebastos, chartoularios, proedros, domestikos, protostrator, logothetis, megas hetaireiarches, protonotarios, prokathimenos, protallagator, and sebastohypertatos (by Leon Sgouros).

== Members ==
There have been about 90 recorded members of the family and its branches between the 11th and 15th centuries. Of those, only four were women. Furthermore, 37 belonged to the branch of Sgourópouloi (one related through marriage to the Doukas family), 16 to Sgoúroi (one related through marriage to the Doukas family), 14 to Sgouroí, four to Sgouromállides (two related through marriage to the Palaiologoi family), two Sgourítzes, and one Sgouranós, Sgourogiánnis, and Sgourothomás respectively. The following table lists them chronologically.

Names	Dates	Notes
Mihaíl Sgourós	11th c.	protospatharios
N. Sgourós	1086	proedros and accountant
Léon Sgourós	1088	chartoularios tou sekretou
Mihaíl Sgourós	1192, 1197	grammarian
Ioánnis Sgourós	fl. 1195–1203	notable grammarian and notary
Nikítas Sgourópoulos	1193	scribe
Theódoros Sgourós	1180/1189 – c. 1200	father of Leon Sgouros and archon of Nafplio
Léon Sgourós	c. 1200 – c. 1208	despot of Argolid and Corinthia, sebastohypertatos
Evdokía Aggelína–Sgoúrena	fl. 1204–1208	wife of Leon Sgouros
Gavriíl Sgourós	fl. 1200/1208–1211/1212	brother of Leon Sgouros and garrison commander of Nafplio
Konstantínos Sgourítzis	before 1264	reader or lector, husband of Sevastía (landholder of Cephalonia)
Vasílios Sgourós	1279	from Constantinople
Loscuro (Lo Sguro)	1277	prison guard in Licolourafo (maybe Salamis)
N. Sgoúros	c. 1277–1278	follower of bishop from New Heraclea (western Minor Asia)
N. Sgoúros	fl. 1282–1298	clergyman of the diocese of Varavlonia (Avlona)
Xénos Sgourítzis	1283	priest in Smyrna
Simeón Sgourópoulos	c. 1283–1289	employee (?) of Gregory II of Constantinople
N. Sgourós	c. 1283–1289	treasurer of Ecumenical Patriarchate of Constantinople
Manouíl Sgourópoulos	fl. 1286–1293	domestikos of eastern themata, landowner of Lembiotissa Monastery (near Smyrna), slave of Andronikos II Palaiologos, pansebastos sebastos
Geórgios Sgouromállis (Sguro-mally)	c. 1293	protostrator, protallagator of Morea
Dimítrios Sgourópoulos	1297 – c. 1299	imperial envoy (correspondence with Maximus Planudes)
Manouíl Sgourópoulos	1298 and after	landowner (?)
Ioánnis Sgourós	13th c.	hymnographer (?)
Manouíl Sgourópoulos	beginning of 14th c.	wheat trader in Constantinople
N. Sgoúros	c. 1300	paroikos in Vrasta, Chalkidiki
Geórgios Sgoúros	fl. c. 1300–1321	paroikos in Selas, Chalkidiki
Kónstas Sgoúros	1304	paroikos in Lemnos
Manouíl Sgourópoulos	c. 1307–1308	correspondence with Michael Gabras
Mihaíl Sgouranós	c. 1313–1316	deacon and lector in Mamouderta, Bithynia
Nikólaos Sgourópoulos	1314	priest in the suburb of Mina, Constantinople
Christóforos Sgourópoulos	1314	cleric in Thessalonica
Aléxios Sgourópoulos	1315	dignitary (correspondence with Michael Gabras)
N. Sgouromállis	c. 1316	sebastos in Laconia
Bezános Sgoúros	fl. 1316–1341	paroikos in Rodolivos, Serres
N. Sgourópoulos	before 1318	landowner in Psalida, Chalkidiki
N. Sgourópoulos	before 1319	founder of St George's Monastery in Artaki (Cyzicus)
Sgoúrena N.	1319	paroikos in Malouka, Strymon
Manouíl Sgourópoulos	1320	paroikos in Melitziani, Strymon
Theódoros Sgoúros	before 1321	resident in Pteleon, Chalkidiki
Mihaíl Sgoúros	1320/1321	witness of sale deed by Archistratigos' Monastery of Zichni
Ioánnis Sgoúros	1321	paroikos in Lorotos, Chalkidiki
N. Sgoúros	1321	sebastos, primate of Ioannina (in chrysobull by Andronikos II Palaiologos)
Nikólaos Sgourós	1322	from Thessalonica (?)
Iákovos Sgourópoulos	c. 1323 – c. 1340	clerk of Ecumenical Patriarchate of Constantinople
Dimítrios Sgoúros	1327	archon of Thessalonica
N. Sgourópoulos	1330	brother-in-law of Ioannis Laskaris and Georgios Padiatis (?)
Ioánnis Sgourogiánnis	1331/1332	donor of the Theotokos' Monastery in Kakodiki, Chania
N. Sgourogiannoú	1331/1332	donoress of the Theotokos' Monastery in Kakodiki, Chania
N. Sgourós	1331/1332	donor of the Theotokos' Monastery in Kakodiki, Chania
N. Sgourós	1334	landowner in Katroula, Constantinople
N. Sgourópoulos	before 1338	sebastos (?)
Dimítrios Sgourópoulos	1341/1342	servant of John VI Kantakouzenos
N. Sgourópoulos	fl. c. 1342	broker in Constantinople, landowner of Great Lavra's Monastery, Mount Athos
N. Sgourópoulos	first half of 14th c.	correspondent (correspondence with Georgios Oinaiotis)
N. Sgourópoulos	c. 1353 – c. 1354	merchant in Constantinople, originating from Piges, Mysia
Andréas Sgourópoulos	1357	priest in Constantinople
Geórgios Sgourópoulos	1357	priest in Constantinople
Mihaíl Sgourópoulos	1357	priest and taboularios in Constantinople
Mihaíl Sgoúros	1357	priest in Constantinople
Damiano Sgurothoma (Damianós Sgourothomás)	fl. 1360–1370	cowherd in Nafplio
N. Sgourópoulos	1361–1364	judge (?)
N. Sgourópoulos Doúkas	fl. 1362 and prior	scribe (?)
N. Sgoúros	1362, 1377 and prior	judge of military camp in Rafalion, Chalkidiki
N. Sgourópoulos	1364	donor of Kolyva, Constantinople; could be the same individual as N. Sgourópoulos(c. 1353 – c. 1354)
Ioánnis Sgourópoulos	1373–1376	cleric and editor of documents in Thessalonica
Manouíl Sgourópoulos	fl. 1372–1375	interpreter in Constantinople (correspondence with Demetrios Kydones)
N. Sgoúros	c. 1381–1382	soldier (travelled from Thessalonica to Constantinople)
N. Sgourópoulos	1387	priest and lawyer in Chrysoupoli, Strymon
Manouíl Sgourópoulos	fl. 1387	deacon of Hagia Sophia, Constantinople
Mihaíl Sgourópoulos	fl. 1390–1400	cleric and owner of house in Constantinople
Ioánnis Sgourópoulos	second half of 14th c.	scribe (?)
Stéphanos Sgourópoulos	second half of 14th c. – beginning of 15th c.	protonotarios at the court of Komnenoi in Trebizond, lyricist
N. Sgouropoulína	1400	landowner in Constantinople
Iákovos Sgourópoulos	1400	employee of Ecumenical Patriarchate of Constantinople
Kóstas Sgourís	1409	paroikos in Pinsona, Chalkidiki
Theódoros Sgourís	1415	worker in the salt pans of Thessalonica
Dimítrios Sgourópoulos	1415	worker in the salt pans of Thessalonica
N. Sgourós	1419	cleric, chartoularios of Hagios Demetrios' Monastery in Thessalonica
N. Sgourós	1422	landowner in Meteora
Matthéos Paleológos Sgouromállis	1426	native of Sparta, Peloponnese
Geórgios Sgourópoulos	1430	domestikos and composer
Dimítrios Sgourópoulos	fl. 1443–1447, d. 1491 or later	scribe of Bessarion
Manouíl Sgourópoulos	1446	from Chios (?)
Ioánnis Sgourópoulos	first half of 15th c.	archon of the churches, deacon, composer, domestikos of Hagia Sophia, Constantinople
Petrus Sguro (Pétros Sgourós)	c. 1452–1453	military captain in Heraklion, Crete
Sgouromállis Paleológos	c. 1460	archon of Karytaina
Andrónikos Doúkas Sgoúros	15th c.	orator and writer (against Latins)
Dimítrios Sgourópoulos	middle of 15th c. (?)	reader or lector (?)
