= Astius =

Christian martyr and saint

Saint Astius Shën Asti άγιος Άστιος

Martyr and Bishop of Dyrrhachium
- Hometown: Roman Dyrrhachium
- Died: c. 98; Dyrrhachium, Epirus Nova, Roman Empire (modern Durrës, Albania)
- Venerated in: Roman Catholic Church and Eastern Orthodox Church
- Feast: 4 July – Eastern Orthodox Albanians celebrate on July 6
- Patronage: City of Durrës

Astius (died AD 98 AD; Albanian: Asti, Greek: Άστιος) is a 2nd-century Christian martyr venerated by the Roman Catholic and Eastern Orthodox churches. He was the bishop of Dyrrhachium (now Durrës in Albania).

According to legend, he was arrested by Agricola, the Roman governor of Dyrrachium, and was tortured to death around 98 AD for refusing to worship the god Dionysus. He was crucified during the persecution of Christians under the Roman emperor Trajan.

== Life ==
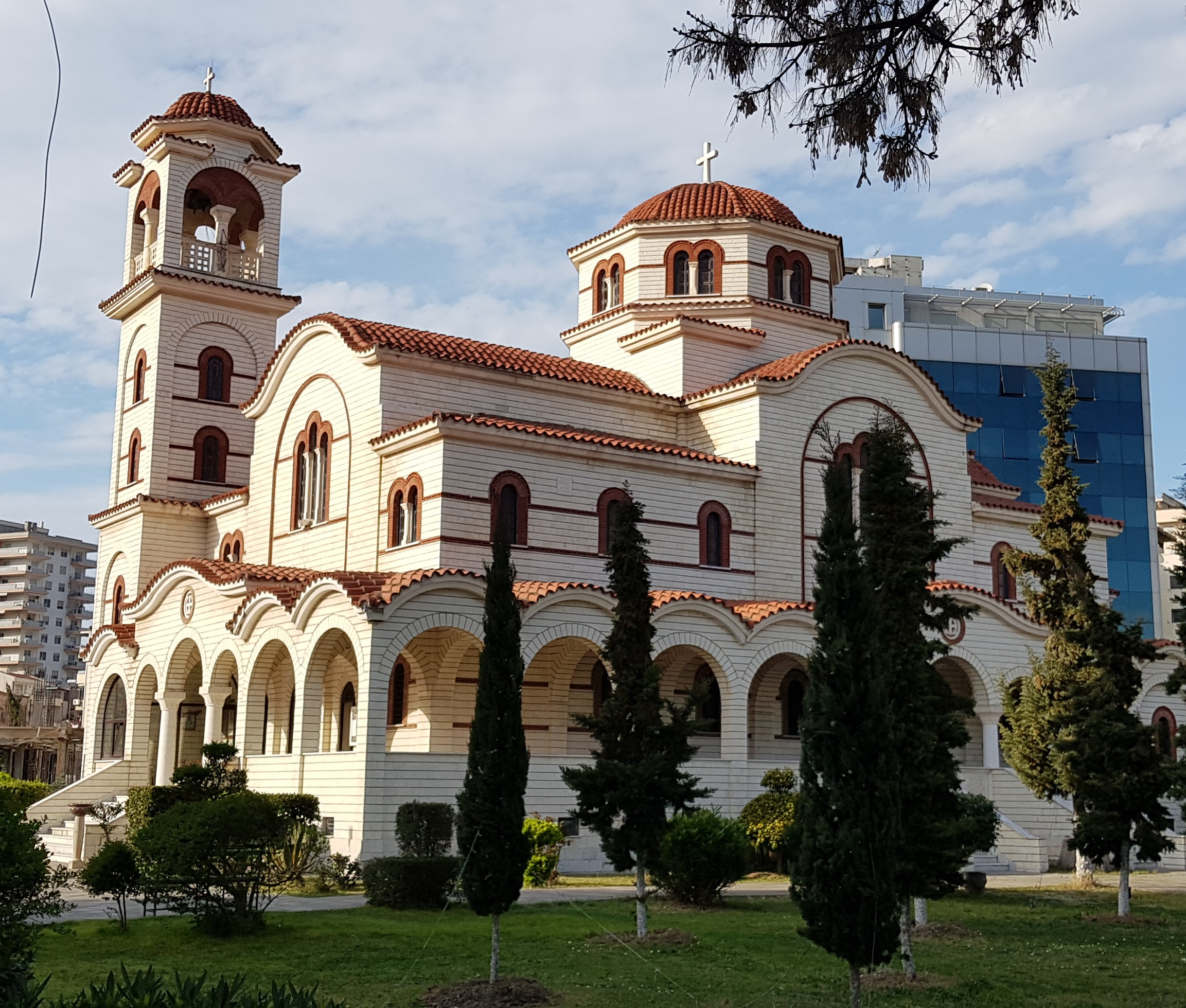
Asti Church in Durrës.

Astius was bishop of the city of Dyrrachium (Durrës), during the time of the emperor Trajan (98–117). The saint once had a dream, a foreboding of his impending suffering and death for Christ. He was arrested by the Roman governor of Dyrrachium, Agricola, around the year 98. He was beaten with leaden rods and oxhide whips, but St Astius did not renounce Christ. They smeared his body with honey, so as to increase his suffering with the stings of hornets and flies, and crucified him for refusing to worship Dionysus. The martyr's body was reverently buried by Christians.

During this period, many Christians fled to Epirus to escape persecution in Italy. Among them were the seven holy martyrs: Peregrinus, Lucian, Pompeius, Hesychius, Papius, Saturninus and Germanus. Witnessing the martyrdom of Bishop Astius, who was crucified by the Romans, they openly praised the courage and firmness of the holy confessor. Because of this, they were seized, and as confessors of faith in Christ, they were arrested, thrown into chains, and subsequently drowned in the Adriatic Sea. Their bodies, carried to shore by the waves, were hidden in the sand by Christians. The martyrs appeared to the Bishop of Alexandria ninety years later, ordering him to bury their bodies and to build a church over them. Their feast day is 7 July.

== Veneration ==
Progonos Sgouros, an Albanian nobleman and Byzantine general, restored the Church of St. Mary Peribleptos in Ohrid, at the time under Byzantine rule, a portrait of Saint Astius in the church was likely donated by him as a symbol of the close ties between Durrës and Ohrid.

Saint Astius’ feast day is July 4. In Albania, he is commemorated on July 6. He was declared patron protector of the city of Durrës.
