= Theodora Angelina =

Wife of Leopold VI, Duke of Austria

- Theodora's 1226 seal
- Born: 1190; Constantinople (modern-day Istanbul, Turkey)
- Died: 23 June 1246 (aged about 55–56); Kahlenberg (modern-day Austria)
- Noble family: Angelos
- Spouses: (1) Ivanko (2) Dobromir Chrysos (3) Leopold VI, Duke of Austria
- Issue: With Leopold; Margaret, Queen of Bohemia; Gertrude of Austria; Agnes of Austria; Leopold of Austria; Henry II, Duke of Mödling; Frederick II, Duke of Austria; Constance, Margravine of Meissen
- Father: Isaac Komnenos Vatatzes
- Mother: Anna Komnene Angelina

Theodora Angelina (Greek: Θεοδώρα Αγγελίνα; 1190 – 23 June 1246) was the wife of Leopold VI of Austria, by whom she had several children. As a child, she was used by her grandfather, Emperor Alexios III Angelos, as a political tool to gain the allegiance of the regional strongmen Ivanko and Dobromir Chrysos. Her betrothals or marriages to them were cut short as both were successively captured by the Emperor.

== Identity ==
The identity of Leopold VI's wife has long been disputed by scholars. The medieval sources only recorded her name, Theodora, and that she was the granddaughter of a Byzantine emperor (Theodoram neptam regis Graecorum duxit uxorem, Theodoram neptem regis Grecie). Modern scholars, beginning with Georg Juritsch in 1894, have offered different opinions on who that emperor was, with some considering Theodora the granddaughter of Isaac II Angelos (r. 1185–1195, 1203–1204), while others held that it was Alexios III Angelos (r. 1195–1203). Still others interpreted the neptis not as granddaughter as in Classical Latin, but as niece, or even great-niece, which was the more common meaning of the word in the Middle Ages.

She has now been conclusively identified as the daughter of Isaac Komnenos Vatatzes, the grandson of the Byzantine general Theodore Vatatzes and the purple-born princess Eudokia Komnene, daughter of Emperor John II Komnenos (r. 1118–1143), and of Anna Komnene Angelina, the second daughter of Emperor Alexios III Angelos).

== Life ==
Her parents married in or slightly before 1190, and Theodora was born shortly after, since in 1203 she was just entering her fourteenth year.

=== Betrothal to Ivanko ===
Her father was promoted to the rank of sebastokrator when Alexios III acceded to the throne in 1195, but in the summer of the same year, he was captured during a campaign against Bulgarian rebels under Asen, and imprisoned in the Bulgarian capital, Tarnovo, where he died in spring 1196.

According to one story relayed by the contemporary chronicler Niketas Choniates, Isaac played a role in the assassination of Asen by the disaffected Bulgarian boyar Ivanko: Isaac reportedly promised Ivanko the hand of Theodora, in exchange for the deed. Isaac died before Asen's murder, but after Ivanko killed Asen and fled to the Byzantine court, where he entered Imperial service, Emperor Alexios III betrothed him to Theodora to cement his allegiance. Due to her young age—Choniates describes the bride-to-be as "a child mouthing baby talk"—the marriage, if there ever was one, was never consummated; Theodora remained in Constantinople, while Ivanko rose in revolt in 1199, only to be captured and imprisoned by a ruse.

=== Marriage to Dobromir Chrysos ===
Shortly after, Theodora was used by Alexios III to gain the allegiance of another regional Balkan warlord, Dobromir Chrysos, who in 1201 had risen in revolt along with the disaffected Byzantine general Manuel Kamytzes. Chrysos was already married to Kamytzes' daughter, but readily accepted the Emperor's offer, and in return surrendered the fortresses of Pelagonia (modern Bitola) and Prilep, that he had captured, to the Emperor's forces. Shortly after, Alexios III turned on Chrysos as well, and took him prisoner.

=== Marriage to Leopold VI of Austria and offspring ===
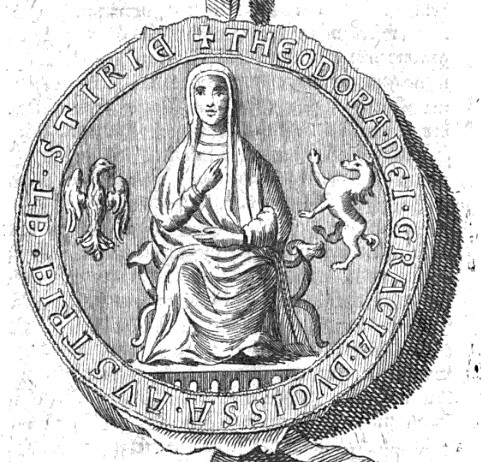
seal of Theodora Angelina

In 1203, Theodora married a distant cousin, Leopold VI, Duke of Austria. Her husband died in 1230 and she subsequently became a nun at Klosterneuburg Monastery. She died there on 23 June 1246, reportedly of grief for the death of her son, Frederick II, in battle against the Hungarians eight days before.

Leopold and Theodora had seven children:

1. Margaret, Duchess of Austria (1204 - February 28, 1266)
2. Agnes of Austria (February 19, 1205 - August 29, 1226)
3. Leopold of Austria (1207–1216) fell from a tree and died
4. Henry II, Duke of Mödling (1208 - November 28, 1228)
5. Gertrude of Austria (1210–1241)
6. Frederick II, Duke of Austria (25 April 1211 - June 15, 1246)
7. Constantia of Austria (April 6, 1212 - June 5, 1243)

== Representations in art ==
Theodora is shown on the late 15th-century family tree of the House of Babenberg at the Klosterneuburg Monastery north of Vienna. Along with her husband she is also one of the historical figures of the Ankeruhr, a monumental mechanical clock in Vienna city center.

== Sources ==
- Choniates, Nicetas (1984). O City of Byzantium, Annals of Niketas Choniatēs. Translated by Harry J. Magoulias. Detroit: Wayne State University Press. ISBN 0-8143-1764-2.
- Neukam, Susanna (2013). Schweigen ist Silber, Herrschen ist Gold: Die Babenbergerinnen und ihre Zeit (in German). Vienna: Amalthea Signum. ISBN 978-3-85002-822-6.
- Preiser-Kapeller, Johannes (2011). "Von Ostarrichi an den Bosporus. Ein Überblick zu den Beziehungen im Mittelalter" [From Ostarrichi to the Bosporus: An Overview of Relations in the Middle Ages]. Pro Oriente Jahrbuch 2010 (in German). Vienna: 66–77.
- Rhoby, Andreas (2004). "Wer war die "zweite" Theodora von Österreich? Analyse des Quellenproblems" [Who was the "second" Theodora of Austria? Analysis of the Sources]. Wiener Byzantinistik und Neogräzistik. Beiträge zum Symposion "Vierzig Jahre Institut für Byzantinistik und Neogräzistik der Universität Wien im Gedenken an Herbert Hunger" (Wien, 4.–7. Dezember 2002). Byzantina et Neograeca Vindobonensia XXIV (in German). Vienna. pp. 387–396.
- Varzos, Konstantinos (1984). Η Γενεαλογία των Κομνηνών [The Genealogy of the Komnenoi] (PDF) (in Greek). Vol. B. Thessaloniki: Centre for Byzantine Studies, University of Thessaloniki.
