= Manuel Kamytzes =

Byzantine general and rebel

- Born: c. 1150
- Died: after 1202
- Military career
- Allegiance: Byzantine Empire
- Service years: 1185/86–1199
- Rank: protostrator
- Conflicts: Third Norman invasion of the Balkans; Revolt of Alexios Branas; Uprising of Asen and Peter; Third Crusade; Revolt of Ivanko; Revolt of Dobromir Chrysos

Manuel Kamytzes Komnenos Doukas Angelos (Greek: Μανουήλ Καμύτζης Κομνηνός Δούκας Ἄγγελος; c. 1150 – after 1202) was a Byzantine general who was active in the late 12th century, and led an unsuccessful rebellion in 1201–02, against his cousin, Emperor Alexios III Angelos.

A member of the Kamytzes family, the Byzantine high nobility and cousin of emperors Isaac II Angelos and Alexios III Angelos, Kamytzes served as a senior military commander in the Balkans, with the rank of protostrator, from 1185/86 until 1199. For Isaac II he fought against the Norman invaders in 1185 and the uprising of Alexios Branas in 1186/87. Kamytzes twice campaigned against the Vlach–Bulgarian rebellion in the northern Balkans, as well as against Cuman raiders in the same region. In 1189, he clashed with the German contingent of the Third Crusade, under Frederick I Barbarossa, as they crossed Byzantine territory.

Under Alexios III, Kamytzes campaigned unsuccessfully against the Bulgarian rebel leader Ivanko in 1197. In early 1199, as Alexios III briefly fell gravely ill, Kamytzes was one of the imperial relatives who put themselves forward for the throne. Later in the year, he was captured by Ivanko, but the Emperor not only refused to ransom him, but also confiscated his possessions and imprisoned his family. Enraged at this treatment, Kamytzes joined his son-in-law, Dobromir Chrysos, in rebellion in 1201. Kamytzes captured Thessaly, but was quickly abandoned by Chrysos and defeated by the Imperial armies in 1202. Kamytzes probably fled to Bulgaria, where he died.

== Origin ==
Born around 1150, Manuel Kamytzes was the son of Constantine Kamytzes (Note: The Kamytzes family name is first attested in the sources in the late 11th century. The family name has been suggested by Nikos A. Bees to be of Greek origin, but other scholars believe that the family originates with the Turkish mercenary commander Kamyres, who entered Byzantine service in 1083. However, the first evidence of the family predates Kamyres and is an extant lead seal of the strategos (general) and protospatharios epi tou Chrysotriklinou Theodore Kamytzes, dating to 1030–1050.) and Maria Angelina Komnene. From his mother, Manuel inherited the prestigious surnames of "Angelos", "Doukas", and "Komnenos", linking him to three Byzantine imperial dynasties. In his only surviving lead seal, Manuel himself uses only the surnames of Kamytzes and "Komnenodoukas".

Manuel's father is only known from funeral elegies by the court poets Theodore Prodromos and the so-called "Manganeios Prodromos", who laud him as a distinguished general ("the diamond spear of the Younger Rome") and record that he held the rank of sebastos. His mother was the firstborn child of Constantine Angelos, the founder of the Angelos family. Her mother, Theodora, was a purple-born princess, the daughter of the Byzantine emperor Alexios I Komnenos (r. 1081–1118). Manuel had siblings, but their number or names are unknown.

== Career ==
Manuel Kamytzes is first mentioned in 1185, during the reign of Andronikos I Komnenos (r. 1183–1185), Kamytzes' first cousin, once removed. According to a brief notice by Archbishop Eustathius of Thessalonica, Kamytzes participated as a commander in the campaign against the Italo-Normans who were besieging Thessalonica, but no details are given.

=== Under Isaac II ===
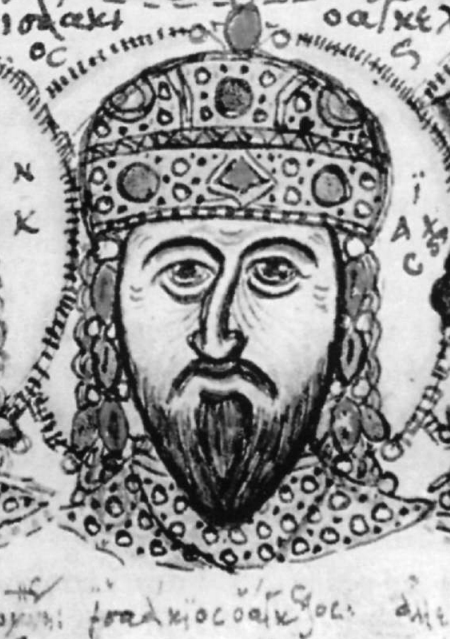
Portrait of Isaac II, from the 15th-century Mutinensis gr. 122 codex

In 1185, Isaac II Angelos (r. 1185–1195, 1203–1204), a first cousin on his mother's side, took the throne, and Kamytzes received the title of protostrator. By this time, this rank was reserved for very prominent aristocrats with close family ties to the reigning dynasty. Kamytzes played an important role in the suppression of the revolt of the general Alexios Branas, which broke out during the summer of 1186, or, more likely, in 1187. Kamytzes and Branas were bitter enemies at court, so Kamytzes made his entire fortune available to the Emperor for use against the rebel, and himself commanded the left wing of the Imperial army under Conrad of Montferrat that defeated and killed the rebel before the Walls of Constantinople.

In September 1187, Isaac II marched out to campaign against the Vlach–Bulgarian uprising of Asen and Peter, that had been gaining ground in the northern Balkans with the aid of Cuman mercenaries. At Lardeas, the Byzantines came upon a Cuman raiding force of 6,000 men. In the ensuing battle, in which Kamytzes commanded one of the Imperial army's detachments, the Cuman raiders were routed and their prisoners, some 12,000, were liberated.

In 1189, when the army of Frederick I Barbarossa crossed Byzantine territory as part of the Third Crusade, Kamytzes was charged, along with the Domestic of the West (commander-in-chief of the European field army), Alexios Gidos, to keep watch on the German forces and harass them by attacking any foraging parties. When Barbarossa seized Philippopolis, he sent a message to Kamytzes, stressing that his sole intention was safe and peaceful passage through Byzantine lands. Kamytzes passed this on to Isaac II, but the latter, fearing that Barbarossa secretly intended to march on Constantinople and depose him, berated Kamytzes for his inaction and ordered him to engage the Germans. As a result, Kamytzes with some 2,000 horsemen moved to set up an ambush for the Germans' supply train near Philippopolis, around 22 November 1189. The Germans were informed of this from the Armenian inhabitants of the fortress of Prousenos, where Kamytzes had set up his main camp, and set out with 5,000 cavalry to attack the Byzantine camp. The two forces met by accident near Prousenos, and in the ensuing battle, Kamytzes' men were routed. The historian Niketas Choniates—who was governor of Philippopolis and an eyewitness—writes that the Byzantines fled as far as Ohrid, and that Kamytzes abandoned his men during the flight and did not rejoin them until three days later.

In 1190 Kamytzes participated in yet another campaign against the Bulgarian rebels in the area of the Balkan Mountains. Along with Isaac Komnenos, he commanded the Imperial army's vanguard, while Isaac II and his brother Alexios (the future Alexios III Angelos, r. 1195–1203) commanded the main body and the sebastokrator (Note: The third-highest title in the imperial hierarchy after despot and co-emperor.) John Doukas (an uncle of Kamytzes) was in command of the rear guard. During their retreat through a narrow pass, the Bulgarians allowed the vanguard to pass, but then fell on the rest of the army, which panicked and fled.

=== Under Alexios III ===
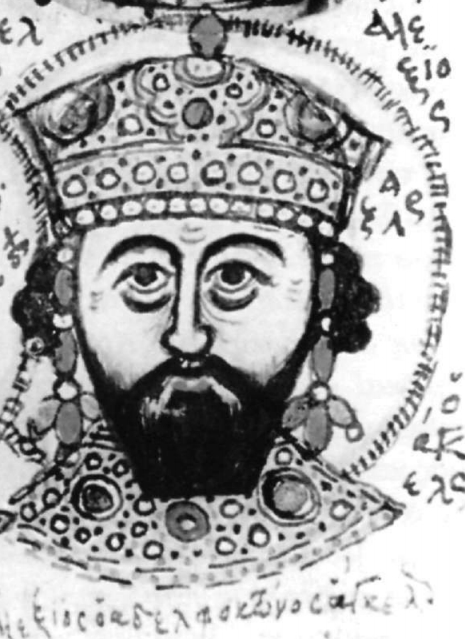
Portrait of Alexios III from the Mutinensis gr. 122

Kamytzes' life during the remainder of the reign of Isaac II is unknown, as is his role in, or opinion of, Isaac's overthrow by his own brother Alexios III, although he was most likely not involved in it. Kamytzes apparently preserved his post and participated in Alexios' coronation ceremonies in the capital: Choniates records that, after the coronation in the Hagia Sophia, according to protocol, the protostrator held the reins of the new emperor's horse.

In 1196, the Vlach boyar Ivanko murdered the leader of the Bulgarian rebellion, Asen. Ivanko and his partisans seized the Bulgarian capital, Tarnovo, but faced with Asen's brother, Peter, they sent messages to Alexios III, urging him to come to their aid and take possession of Tarnovo. Alexios was reluctant to leave the palace, and dispatched Kamytzes in his stead. Kamytzes set out from Philippopolis, but just as he was crossing into Moesia (the plains along the Danube), the army mutinied and refused to go on and risk a battle with the Bulgarians, citing the many perilous, and fruitless, expeditions they had undertaken in the region in the past. Kamytzes was forced to give in to his soldiers' demands and turned back. As a result, Ivanko was forced to abandon Tarnovo, where Peter established himself as the undisputed ruler of the Bulgarians. Ivanko fled to the Byzantine court, and was tasked with holding Philippopolis against Peter's Bulgarians.

In the spring of 1197, Alexios III campaigned against the Vlach warlord Dobromir Chrysos, who had founded his own, independent domain around the fortresses of Strumica and Prosek. After failing to capture Prosek by force of arms, the Emperor came to terms with Chrysos, who acknowledged Imperial suzerainty in exchange for a new wife: Kamytzes' daughter, who was forced to divorce her first husband to become Chrysos' bride.

In 1199, Alexios III fell gravely ill, leading to a dispute about the succession. The Emperor had only daughters, and although two of them had been wed to Byzantine aristocrats—Andronikos Kontostephanos and Isaac Vatatzes—who were thus heirs-apparent, both of them had died shortly before. Various contenders for the throne put themselves forward among the wider imperial family: Kamytzes himself clashed with the elderly John Doukas, while the Emperor's three brothers—Constantine, John, and Theodore—who had been blinded by Andronikos I and were thus themselves ineligible, jockeyed for their own sons, as did their brother-in-law, the Caesar (Note: The next rank after sebastokrator.) John Kantakouzenos, who had also been blinded. In the end their scheming, angrily denounced by the disgusted Choniates, came to naught: in February 1199, the Emperor married his widowed daughters to another pair of Byzantine aristocrats, Alexios Palaiologos (who became despot and heir-apparent) and Theodore Laskaris, the future founder of the Empire of Nicaea.

Later in 1199, Ivanko rebelled against Byzantine authority. Against him, Alexios sent his new sons-in-law and Kamytzes. Ivanko managed to evade the three Byzantine commanders and flee to the mountains. Reluctant to engage in a possibly hopeless pursuit in the mountain fastnesses, the Byzantines instead decided to subdue the fortresses of the Philippopolis region, starting with Kritzimos. One by one, the fortresses were captured, either by capitulating or being taken by storm. Ivanko then set a trap for Kamytzes. He had his men gather flocks of livestock, as well as some prisoners of war, and take them across the plain as an ostensible tribute to his ally, the Bulgarian ruler Kaloyan. Learning of this, Kamytzes left his base at the fortress of Batrachokastron and with his men came to plunder the livestock. As the Byzantine troops dispersed to capture booty, Ivanko and his men emerged from the woods, killed them, and took Kamytzes prisoner. This stroke reversed the course of the campaign, as the demoralized Byzantines drew back, and Ivanko extended his domain south up to the area of Smolyan, Mosynopolis, and Mount Pangaion.

=== Imprisonment and rebellion ===
While Kamytzes languished in prison, writes Choniates, "the emperor, as his actions demonstrated, reckoned the protostrator's capture a godsend, a delightful and excellent piece of good luck. Making a diligent search of all his assets, he laid his hands on the man's immense riches that befitted a monarch; he also sentenced his wife and son to prison, on what grounds I know not." Kamytzes sent letters to Alexios pleading to be ransomed, but the Emperor refused. In desperation, after about a year of captivity, Kamytzes turned to his son-in-law, Dobromir Chrysos. The latter agreed, and paid the sum—200 pounds (about 64 kg) of gold, according to Choniates. (Note: Notably, Choniates also composed a victory oration to Alexios III after the suppression of Kamytzes' rebellion, where he presents a completely different picture of events than in his History, likening Kamytzes' revolt against Alexios to that of Absalom against his father, David, and castigating Kamytzes for not waiting for the Emperor to ransom him, but preferring to sell himself to the barbarian Chrysos.) Kamytzes was released and conveyed to Prosek, from where he again wrote to the Emperor, asking that Chrysos be repaid from his own confiscated fortune, which, as he reminded the Emperor, was many times the sum in question. Alexios, however, "placed his relationship with the protostrator on one scale of the balance and his wealth on the other and weighed both; he found that the second was by far the heavier", and again refused Kamytzes' pleas.

Map of the wider region of Macedonia, where the rebellion of Chrysos and Kamytzes took place

Enraged at his treatment by the Emperor, (Note: As the historian Jean-Claude Cheynet notes, the motivation of Kamytzes' rebellion was "revenge rather than a true attempt to seize imperial power", since no source claims that he ever adopted the imperial insignia.) Kamytzes joined with Chrysos in deciding to attack the neighbouring Byzantine provinces. According to Choniates' account, they easily took Pelagonia (modern Bitola) and Prilep, and crossed the Tempe Valley into Thessaly, which they occupied. While Chrysos returned to Prosek, Kamytzes stayed in Thessaly. The rebellion of Kamytzes led to other uprisings as well: Leo Sgouros rebelled in the Peloponnese, as did the doux (governor) of the province of Smolyan, John Spyridonakes.

While Spyridonakes was swiftly defeated by the despot Alexios Palaiologos, the revolt of Kamytzes proved a more difficult affair for the Byzantines. The Imperial troops under the eunuch parakoimomenos (chamberlain) John Oinopolites appear to have had some success. In autumn 1201, Alexios III took the field himself, but in the end it was diplomacy that proved most effective. The Emperor offered the hand of his granddaughter, Theodora, the former betrothed of Ivanko. Chrysos accepted—presumably he divorced Kamytzes' daughter—and surrendered Pelagonia and Prilep to the Emperor.

At the same time, Oinopolites was sent into Thessaly to offer Kamytzes a pardon and full restoration to his rank. Kamytzes refused, and the Imperial army under Alexios III invaded Thessaly. In the ensuing battle, Kamytzes' army was defeated and he himself wounded in the leg. Fleeing the battlefield, he abandoned Thessaly and fled to the fortress of Stanos (likely Stenimachos), but the Imperial forces pursued him and forced him to abandon it as well.

Nothing further is known of Kamytzes after this point, but he likely found refuge under Kaloyan in Bulgaria, as Spyridonakes before him, and died sometime shortly after.

== Family ==
Kamytzes married around 1170, but his wife's name is unknown. He is known to have had a daughter—the Greek historian Konstantinos Varzos suggests the possible name of Maria for her, after his mother—who was forced by Alexios III to divorce her husband and marry Dobromir in 1198. He also had a son, named John Kamytzes. After his death and the sack of Constantinople in 1204, his family fled to Nicaea. Based on their estates listed in the partition of the Byzantine Empire by the Crusaders, the Kamytzai were among the four largest landowners in the Empire. The family was still considered one of the most prominent aristocratic clans by George Pachymeres in the late 13th century, but few notable members are known.

== Sources ==
- Cheynet, Jean-Claude (1990). Pouvoir et contestations à Byzance (963–1210) [Power and Contestations in Byzantium (963–1210)] (in French). Paris: Publications de la Sorbonne. ISBN 978-2-85944-168-5.
- Choniates, Nicetas (1984). O City of Byzantium, Annals of Niketas Choniatēs. Translated by Harry J. Magoulias. Detroit: Wayne State University Press. ISBN 0-8143-1764-2.
- Gkoutzioukostas, A. and Wassiliou-Seibt, A-K. (2018) "The Origin and the Members of the Kamytzes Family", Dumbarton Oaks Papers, 2018, Vol. 72 (2018), pp. 169–180, Dumbarton Oaks, Trustees for Harvard University. Stable URL: https://www.jstor.org/stable/10.2307/26892568
- Guilland, Rodolphe (1967). "Le Protostrator" [The Protostrator]. Recherches sur les institutions byzantines [Studies on the Byzantine Institutions]. Berliner byzantinische Arbeiten 35 (in French). Vol. I. Berlin and Amsterdam: Akademie-Verlag & Adolf M. Hakkert. pp. 478–497. OCLC 878894516.
- Kazhdan, Alexander, ed. (1991). The Oxford Dictionary of Byzantium. Oxford and New York: Oxford University Press. ISBN 0-19-504652-8.
- Simpson, Alicia (2013). Niketas Choniates: A Historiographical Study. Oxford: Oxford University Press. ISBN 978-0-19-967071-0.
- Varzos, Konstantinos (1984). Η Γενεαλογία των Κομνηνών [The Genealogy of the Komnenoi] (PDF) (in Greek). Vol. A2. Thessaloniki: Centre for Byzantine Studies, University of Thessaloniki.
- Varzos, Konstantinos (1984). Η Γενεαλογία των Κομνηνών [The Genealogy of the Komnenoi] (PDF) (in Greek). Vol. B. Thessaloniki: Centre for Byzantine Studies, University of Thessaloniki.
