= Isaac Komnenos Vatatzes =

Byzantine aristocrat and military commander

Isaac Komnenos Vatatzes (Greek: Ἰσαάκιος Κομνηνός Βατάτζης; died 1196) was a Byzantine aristocrat and military commander, who was the son-in-law of Emperor Alexios III Angelos and received the rank of sebastokrator.

== Life ==
Isaac Komnenos Vatatzes was the youngest son of Alexios Vatatzes, a son of the general Theodore Vatatzes and the purple-born princess Eudokia Komnene, daughter of Emperor John II Komnenos (r. 1118–1143), and of Maria Pegonitissa. The couple married around 1158, at the initiative of Emperor Manuel I Komnenos.

In 1190, Isaac participated in a campaign against the Vlach–Bulgarian uprising of Asen and Peter in the area of the Balkan Mountains. Along with Manuel Kamytzes, he commanded the Imperial army's vanguard, while Emperor Isaac II Angelos (r. 1185–1195, 1203–1204) and his brother Alexios (the future Alexios III Angelos, r. 1195–1203) commanded the main body and the sebastokrator John Doukas was in command of the rear guard. During their retreat through a narrow pass, the Bulgarians allowed the vanguard to pass, but then fell on the rest of the army, which panicked and fled.

Around the same time, he married Anna Komnene Angelina, the second daughter of Alexios Angelos. When Alexios overthrew his brother in 1195 and became emperor, Isaac, as his son-in-law, accompanied him during his coronation procession. It was probably at this point that he was promoted to the rank of sebastokrator, which was appropriate to his familial relationship to the new emperor.

In the summer of 1195, the Bulgarian rebels attacked the region around Serres, and captured the local Byzantine commander, Alexios Aspietes. Isaac was entrusted with leading the campaign against them. According to the contemporary official and historian, Niketas Choniates, the rebels were initially hesitant to confront Isaac's army, and withdrew to raid the valley of the Strymon River. Isaac hastened to meet them, but did so impetuously, so that his men and horses were exhausted; Isaac himself was captured in an ambush by a Cuman soldier, and his army was beaten and turned back to Serres. Isaac was brought before Asen, and led to the Bulgarian capital Tarnovo, where he was imprisoned.

According to one story relayed by Choniates, Isaac played a role in the subsequent assassination of Asen by the disaffected Bulgarian boyar Ivanko: Isaac reportedly promised Ivanko the hand of his daughter, Theodora, in exchange for the deed. However, Isaac died, still imprisoned, in spring 1196, before Asen's murder.

== Family ==
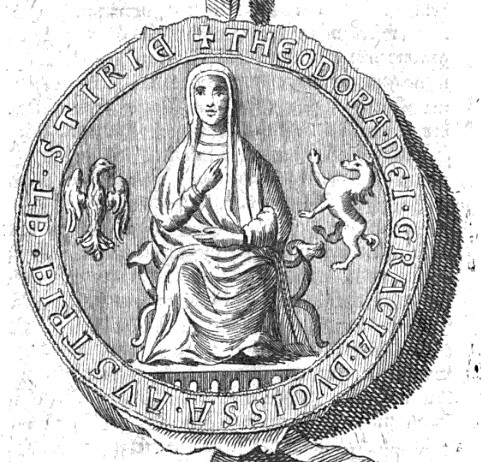
Seal of Isaac's daughter, Theodora, as Duchess of Austria

From Anna Komnene Angelina, Isaac was the father of Theodora Angelina. Despite her being only a child, Theodora was betrothed to Ivanko, who entered Imperial service, in order to consolidate his allegiance, although Choniates reports that Ivanko coveted Anna instead. Due to her young age, the marriage, if there ever was one, was never consummated; Theodora remained in Constantinople, while Ivanko rose in revolt in 1199, only to be captured and imprisoned by a ruse. In 1203, Theodora married Leopold VI, Duke of Austria.

After Isaac's death, his wife remarried, in 1199/1200, to Theodore Laskaris, the future founder of the Empire of Nicaea (r. 1204–1222).

== Sources ==
- Choniates, Nicetas (1984). O City of Byzantium, Annals of Niketas Choniatēs. Translated by Harry J. Magoulias. Detroit: Wayne State University Press. ISBN 0-8143-1764-2.
- Ferjančić, Božidar (1968). "Севастократори у Византији" [Sebastocrators in Byzantium]. Zbornik Radova Vizantološkog Instituta. XI. Belgrade: Institute for Byzantine Studies of the Serbian Academy of Sciences and Arts: 141–192. ISSN 0584-9888.
- Preiser-Kapeller, Johannes (2011). "Von Ostarrichi an den Bosporus. Ein Überblick zu den Beziehungen im Mittelalter" [From Ostarrichi to the Bosporus: An Overview of Relations in the Middle Ages]. Pro Oriente Jahrbuch 2010 (in German). Vienna: 66–77.
- Simpson, Alicia (2013). Niketas Choniates: A Historiographical Study. Oxford: Oxford University Press. ISBN 978-0-19-967071-0.
- Varzos, Konstantinos (1984). Η Γενεαλογία των Κομνηνών [The Genealogy of the Komnenoi] (PDF) (in Greek). Vol. B. Thessaloniki: Centre for Byzantine Studies, University of Thessaloniki.
