= Lead Mosque, Berat =

Mosque in Berat City, Berat County, Albania

Lead Mosque
- Xhamia e Plumbit
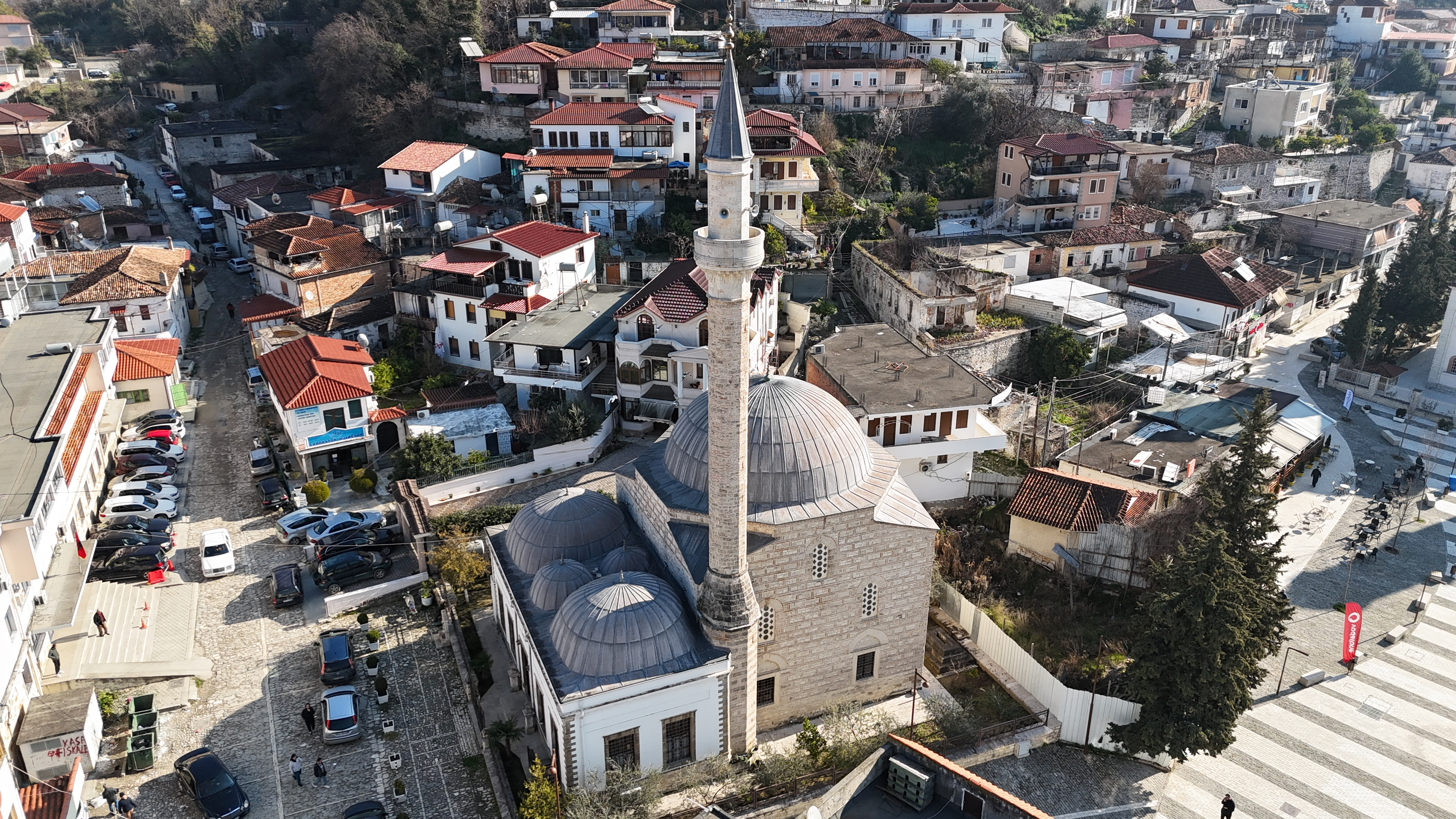
- The mosque in 2025

- Location of the mosque in Albania

Religion
- Affiliation: Islam
- Ecclesiastical or organisational status: Mosque
- Status: Active

Location
- Location: Rruga Gaqi Gjika, Berat, Berat County
- Country: Albania
- Interactive map of Lead Mosque
- Coordinates: 40°42′16″N 19°57′19″E

Architecture
- Type: Islamic architecture
- Style: Ottoman
- Founder: Ahmet Bej Uzgurliu
- Completed: 961 AH (1553/1554 CE)

Specifications
- Dome: 1
- Minaret: 1
- Materials: Lead

Cultural Monument of Albania
- Official name: Lead Mosque, Berat

The Lead Mosque (Albanian: Xhamia e Plumbit; Turkish: Kurşun Camii, lit. 'Kurşunlu Mosque'), known as the Izgurli Mosque, is a mosque located in the city of Berat, in the Berat County, south-central Albania. The mosque is named from the lead coating of its sphere-shaped domes. It was designated as a Cultural Monument of Albania and also forms part of the Historic Centres of Berat and Gjirokastër, designated as a UNESCO World Heritage Site in 2005.

== Historic overview ==
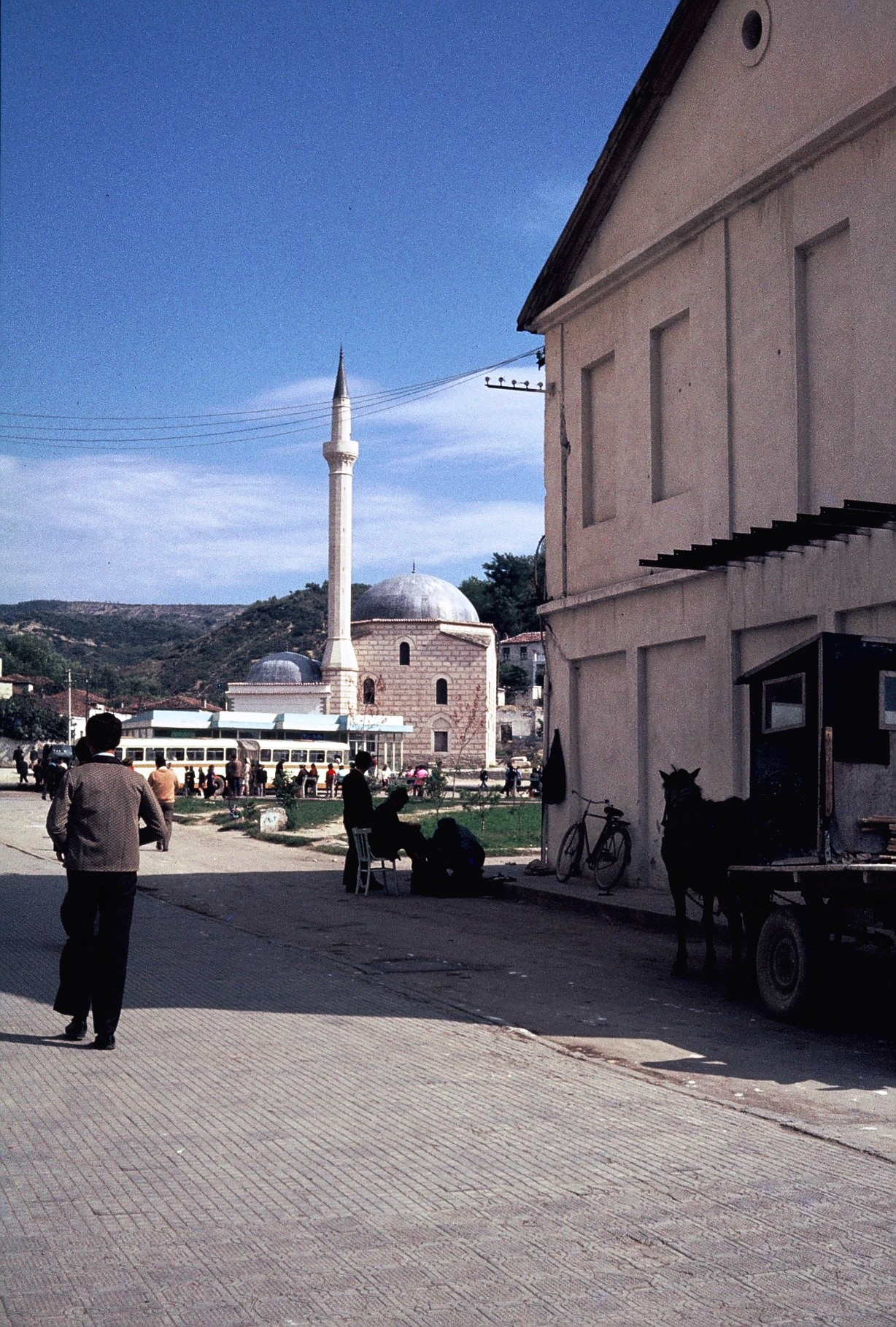
The mosque in 1978

The mosque was completed in 961 AH (1553/1554 CE) by Ahmet Bej Uzgurliu, a local nobleman, at the time a vassal hailing from the Skuraj family. Explorer Evliya Çelebi’s description told of carved stones underneath the lead, topping off a complex including a bazaar, madrasa, imaret, school, hammam (Islamic bathhouse), and shadirvan. The prayer hall is square with a northern portico and a tall, thin minaret molded in cloisonné where it meets the roof. Many windows light the interior.

The Uzgurli mosque was restored in 2014 by the Turkish Cooperation and Coordination Agency (TIKA) during which the minaret balconry (sherefeja) changed slightly and got modernized a bit.

== See also ==
- Islam in Albania
- List of mosques in Albania
