= Ivanko (boyar) =

Boyar and killer of Asen

Ivanko (Bulgarian: Иванко, Greek: Ιβαγκός), also referred to by some scholars as Ivanko-Alexius, was a Vlach boyar who killed his cousin Ivan Asen I, the ruler of the renascent Second Bulgarian Empire, in 1196. He was a leader of local Vlachs and Bulgarian Slavs.

== Life ==
It is not known when and where Ivanko was born. Ivanko served in Bulgarian ruler and his cousin Ivan Asen's court. In 1196, Ivanko murdered Asen. The murder occurred when Asen angrily summoned Ivanko to discipline him for having an affair with his wife's sister. Bulgarian historian Vasil Zlatarski attributed this murder by Ivanko to the Cuman faction in Bulgarian court, as opposed to other explanations involving anti-Vlach Bulgarian boyars, boyar discontent with his harsh rule, Byzantine intrigue, etc. After the murder, he seized the Bulgarian capital Tarnovo and requested the assistance of the Byzantines. However, the Byzantine army mutinied on its way and thus let Asen's brother Peter claim the throne, forcing Ivanko to flee to Byzantine capital Constantinople.

In 1197, Ivanko married Theodora Angelina, the daughter of Anna Angelina and the sebastokrator Isaac Komnenos. Theodora's father had died in Bulgarian captivity not many months earlier. After the marriage, Ivanko adopted the Greek name Alexius. His grandfather-in-law, Byzantine emperor Alexios III Angelos, gave the command of Philippopolis to him to deal with Bulgarian raids. Ivanko recruited and trained an army of his fellow Vlachs to deal with the raiders, but ended up rebelling against the Byzantines. In this period, he had set up an independent principality in Rhodope and central Thrace. He captured the Byzantine general Manuel Kamytzes, who was sent against him; Kamytzes was ransomed by his son-in-law, Ivanko's rival, Dobromir Chrysos.

The emperor's sons-in-law Alexios Palaiologos and Theodore Laskaris marched against Ivanko in 1200. Ivanko was eventually captured when Alexios invited him to a peace council but imprisoned him instead. He was executed by his order. After his death, his fortresses were recovered by the Byzantines. Byzantine historian Niketas Choniates described him as "far worse than earlier rebels, and driven to such cruelty that most barbarians deem to be manliness."

== See also ==
- Asenids

== Bibliography ==
- Cheynet, Jean-Claude (1986). Etudes prosopographiques (in French). Publications de la Sorbonne. ISBN 9782859441104.
- Choniates, Nicetas (1984). O City of Byzantium, Annals of Niketas Choniatēs. Translated by Harry J. Magoulias. Detroit: Wayne State University Press. ISBN 0-8143-1764-2.
- Curta, Florin (2019). Eastern Europe in the Middle Ages (500-1300) (2 vols). BRILL. ISBN 9789004395190.
- Dall'Aglio, Francesco (2021). "Between Rebellion and Statesmanship: Attempting a Biography of Ivanko, 1196/1200". Studia Ceranea. 11. Journal of the Waldemar Ceran Research Centre for the History and Culture of the Mediterranean Area and South-East Europe: 91–106. doi:10.18778/2084-140X.11.05. hdl:11089/41516. ISSN 2449-8378.
- Detrez, Raymond (2010). The A to Z of Bulgaria. Scarecrow Press. ISBN 9780810872028.
- Daskalov, Roumen (2021). Master Narratives of the Middle Ages in Bulgaria. BRILL. ISBN 9789004464872.
- Fine, John (1994). The Late Medieval Balkans: A Critical Survey from the Late Twelfth Century to the Ottoman Conquest. University of Michigan Press. ISBN 9780472082605.
- Kaldellis, Anthony (2023). The New Roman Empire: A History of Byzantium. Oxford University Press. ISBN 9780197549322.
- Kazhdan, Aleksandr (1991). The Oxford Dictionary of Byzantium, Volume 1. Oxford University Press. ISBN 9780195046526.
- Madgearu, Alexandru (2016). The Asanids: The Political and Military History of the Second Bulgarian Empire 1185-1280. BRILL. ISBN 9789004333192.
- Malatras, Christos (2010). The making of an ethnic group: the Romaioi in the 12th-13th centuries (PDF). 4th European Congress of Modern Greek Studies. pp. 1–13.
- Rosser, John (2012). Historical Dictionary of Byzantium. Scarecrow Press. ISBN 9780810875678.
- Shepard, Jonathan (2017). The Expansion of Orthodox Europe: Byzantium, the Balkans and Russia. Routledge. ISBN 9781351890052.
- Simpson, Alicia (2013). Niketas Choniates: A Historiographical Study. OUP Oxford. ISBN 9780199670710.
- Stanković, Vlada (2016). The Balkans and the Byzantine World before and after the Captures of Constantinople, 1204 and 1453. Lexington Books. ISBN 9781498513265.
- Stephenson, Paul (2000). Byzantium's Balkan Frontier: A Political Study of the Northern Balkans, 900-1204. Cambridge University Press. ISBN 9780521770170.
- Treadgold, Warren (1997). A History of the Byzantine State and Society. Stanford University Press. ISBN 9780804726306.
- Wolff, Robert (1949). "The 'Second Bulgarian Empire'. Its Origin and History to 1204". Speculum.
