= Prosek, North Macedonia =

Archaeological site in North Macedonia

Coordinates: 41.4008°N 22.2634°E

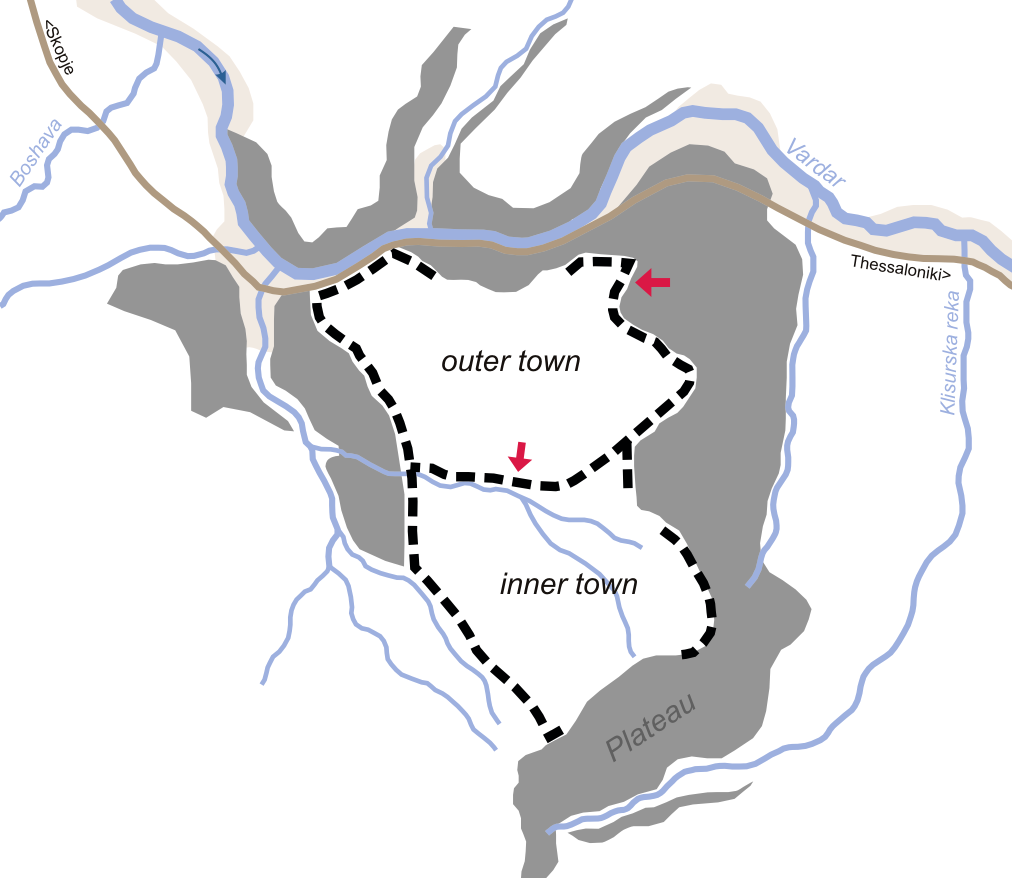
Plan of Prosek fortress

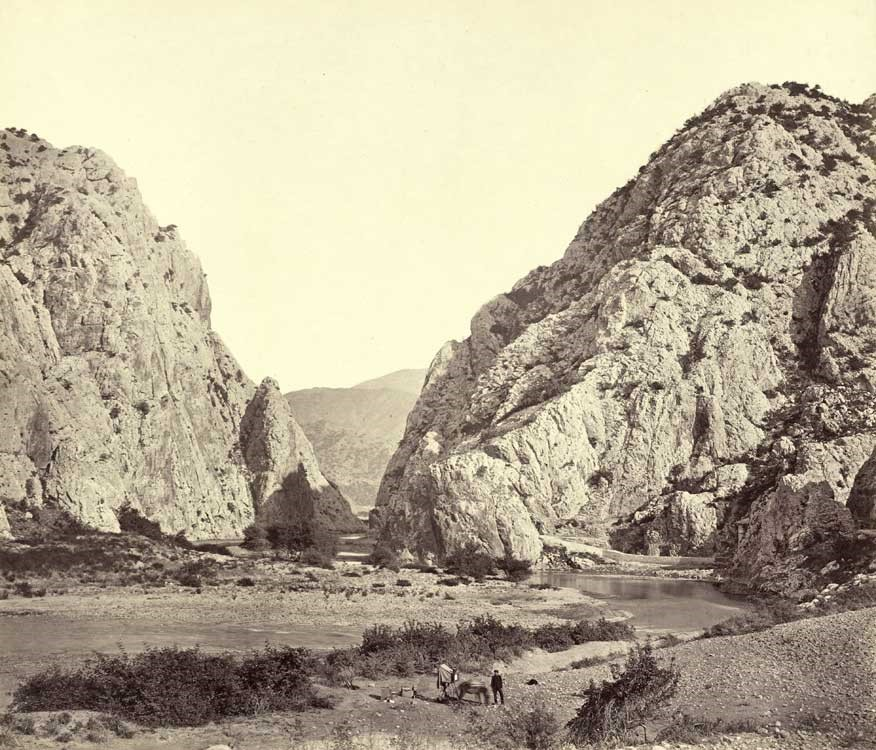
The Demir Kapija gorge of the Vardar: high above is the site of Prosek.

Prosek (Macedonian: Просек), also known as Stenae (in Greek: Στεναί narrow), is an archaeological site of a former city in North Macedonia. It was capital city of the independent rulers Dobromir Chrysos (from the 1190s to 1202) and Strez (from 1208 to 1214).

Its ruins were discovered in 1948, about 1 km south of the town of Demir Kapija. There were found 4 towers, many ceramic objects, jewelry, coins, acropolis and necropolis.

This settlement had an excellent strategical war position. The site is located on a limestone plateau surrounded by a curve of Vardar river. The sheer cliffs and the river make the area suitable for defense. A narrow gap between the rocks leads to the only entrance to the fortress.

During last years of the 12th century and the first years of the 13th century, Prosek was the center of a rebel Byzantine province and later independent domain led by the nobleman Dobromir Chrysos. In 1202 the lands of Dobromir Chrysos were conquered by the Second Bulgarian Empire under tsar Kaloyan. Later in 1208, sebastokrator Strez, claimed Chrysos' lands and was ruler until 1214 when he died, killed by a conspiracy inspired by Sava (later canonized as St. Sava).

== See also ==
- List of castles in North Macedonia
