= Progonos Sgouros =

Gambros - Lord of Ohrid Progon Skura
- Progon Skura
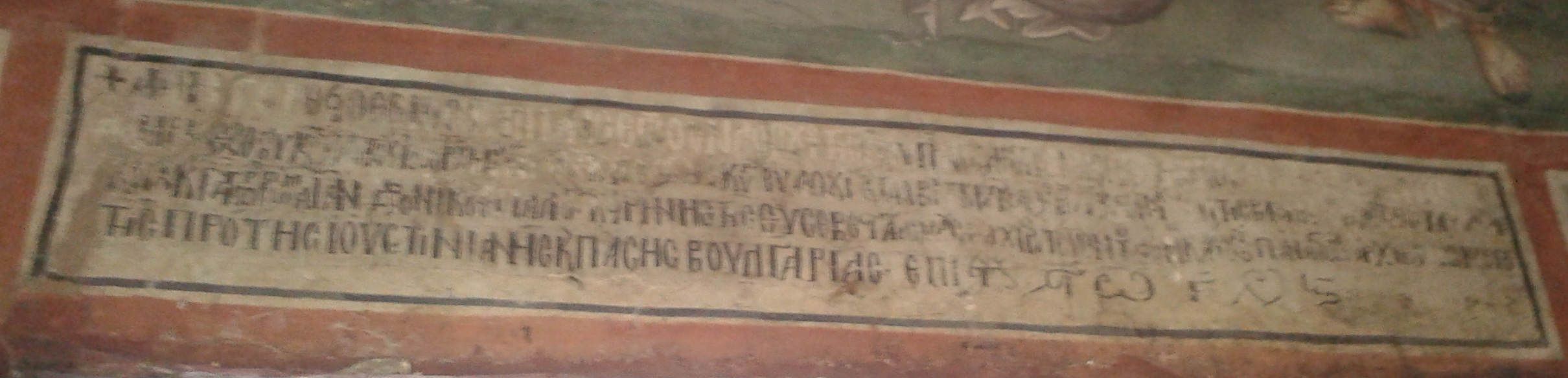
- Inscription in Greek from the year 1295 mentioning Progonos and his wife Eudokia in the St. Mary Perivleptos church in Ohrid.
- Spouse: Eudokia
- Military career
- Allegiance: Byzantine Empire
- Service years: late 13th century
- Rank: megas hetaireiarches
- Unit: Imperial Hetaireia

Progon Skura, Greek: Πρόγονος Σγουρός;fl. 1294–1300) was a late 13th-century Byzantine senior military commander from Principality of Arbanon (Medieval Albania) with the rank of megas hetaireiarches. He was lord of Ohrid during the Byzantine Empire's territorial control over the city.

== Biography ==
Progon Skura was an Albanian from Durrës (Byzantine Dyrrhachion) and belonged to the prominent Skuraj family. (Note: "La chiesa della Madre di Dio Periblepta, chiamata oggi San Clemente, a Ocrida, fu decorata nel 1295 per cura del grande eteriarca bizantino Arbanas Progon Sgouros, strettamente imparentato con la famiglia imperiale tramite matrimonio." tr. "The church of the Mother of God Periblepta, today called St. Clement, in Ohrid, was decorated in 1295 by the great Byzantine heteriarch Arbanas Progon Sgouros, closely related to the imperial family by marriage.") (Note: "An Albanian by the name of Progon Skura (Πρόγονος τοũ Σγούρου) and with the title of hetaireiarches restored the church of St. Clement of Ochrida about 1295.") (Note: Gozdanov also notes, rightly, that the prominent position of St. Asteios' portrait at St. Clement of Ohrid may also be associated with Progon Skura, the commissioning patron originating from Dyrrachion, and with the intention to highlight visually the close ecclesiastical ties between Dyrrachion and Ohrid.) (Note: "Dieses Kloster befand sich eine Zeitlang im Besitz der Skuraj, einer bekannten albanischen Adelsfamilie. Ein Angehöriger dieses Geschlechts, Progon Skura, war Auftraggeber der Fresken in der Klemens - Kirche in Ohrid" tr. "This monastery was for a time owned by the Skuraj, a well-known Albanian noble family. A member of this family, Progon Skura, commissioned the frescoes in the Church of St. Clement in Ohrid") He was married to Eudokia, a female relative of Andronikos II Palaiologos (r. 1282–1328), becoming a gambros of the Byzantine emperor.

Around 1294–1295, he restored the Church of the Virgin Peribleptos in Ohrid, at the time under Byzantine rule, which later came to be known as St. Clement after Saint Clement of Ohrid. Progonos donated an Iconostasis of 8 panels, together with an icon of the Virgin Peribleptos of which only a fragment survived, with the iconostasis depicting the main feasts of the Church. The works were painted by Eutychios and Michael Astrapas, from Thessaloniki. A portrait of Saint Astius in the church was likely donated by him as a symbol of the close ties between Durrës and Ohrid.

In 1296, during Stefan Milutin's invasion of Northern Albania, Progonos would be given command of an Albanian-Byzantine army which would engage the Serbian king somewhere between Ohrid and Tetovo. The battle would result in a victory for Progonos.

Within the church, an inscription mentions Progonos and his wife Eudokia in Greek:

"This divine shrine of the most holy Lady Mother of God Peribleptos was built with the help and expenses of Monsignor Progon Zguros, the Great Etheriarch and his wife Mrs. Eudokia, the son-in-law of our most powerful and pious, the emperor of the Romans, Andronicus Palaeologus…”
