= Paroikoi =

Ancient Greek social class

Paroikoi (plural of Greek πάροικος, paroikos, the etymological origin of parish and parochial) is the term that replaced "metic" in the Hellenistic and Roman period to designate foreign residents.

In the Byzantine Empire, paroikoi were non-proprietary peasants, hereditary holders of their land, irremovable as long as they paid their rent. They appeared in the Justinian code, which prohibited this status; so it remained provisionally clandestine.

Paroikoi are comparable to the western concept of serfs and appear to be widespread by the 13th century.
