= Leo Sgouros =

- Despot and lord of the Argolid, Corinthia and Central Greece
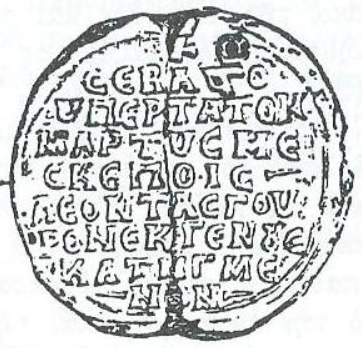
- Lead seal of Leo Sgouros as sebastohypertatos
- Reign: ca. 1198 – 1208
- Predecessor: Theodore Sgouros (as Lord of Nauplia)
- Successor: Frankish conquest: Boniface of Montferrat over Central Greece, Otto de la Roche as Lord of Argos and Nauplia
- Died: 1208; Acrocorinth
- Spouse: Eudokia Angelina
- House: Sgouros

Leo Sgouros (Greek: Λέων Σγουρός), Latinized as Leo Sgurus, was a Greek independent lord in the northeastern Peloponnese in the early 13th century. The scion of the magnate Sgouros family, he succeeded his father as hereditary lord in the region of Nauplia. Taking advantage of the disruption caused by the Fourth Crusade, he made himself independent, one of several local rulers that appeared throughout the Byzantine Empire during the final years of the Angeloi dynasty. He expanded his domain into Corinthia and Central Greece, eventually marrying the daughter of former Byzantine emperor Alexios III Angelos (r. 1195–1203). His conquests, however, were short-lived, as the Crusaders forced him back into the Peloponnese. Blockaded in his stronghold on the Acrocorinth, he committed suicide in 1208.

== Biography ==
=== Rise to power ===
Map of the late medieval Peloponnese.

Leo Sgouros succeeded his father, Theodore Sgouros, in circa 1198 as governor of the area of Nauplia and the Argolid, one of the districts known as oria, that collected taxes and provided ships for the Byzantine navy. In circa 1201/1202, when a rebellion in Thessaly and Macedonia led by Manuel Kamytzes and Dobromir Chrysos cut southern Greece off from Constantinople, several revolts broke out in the Peloponnese: Leo Chamaretos seized control of Sparta, Monemvasia was plagued by violent disputes among its leading families. Leo himself seized the opportunity to establish himself as an independent ruler, capturing the citadels of Argos and Corinth. His hostility to the church, who by that time were seen as the "defenders of the traditional order" in the words of Michael Angold, was profound: the bishop of Nauplion was imprisoned, while the bishop of Corinth was invited to dinner, blinded and thrown to his death from the Acrocorinth. Indeed, Sgouros is generally presented as a violent man: in a letter, Michael Choniates, the bishop of Athens, recounts how Sgouros beat to death a young relative of his who had been delivered as a hostage, merely because he had dropped a glass while waiting at his table.

The imperial government despatched the megas doux, Michael Stryphnos, to counter him. Stryphnos spent the winter of 1201–1202 in Athens, but he was apparently unable to check Sgouros's power. Soon after, while the Byzantine government was preoccupied with the Fourth Crusade, Sgouros launched naval raids against Athens, enlisting the aid of the piratical inhabitants of the islands of Salamis and Aigina. Choniates appealed to the Emperor's ministers Theodore Eirenikos and Constantine Tornikes, but in vain. In the end, he was forced to travel to Constantinople himself in another fruitless effort to secure aid. He returned to find Athens cut off from the provincial capital, Thebes, by Sgouros's troops.

In 1203, as Constantinople was threatened by the Fourth Crusade and despite Michael Choniates's entreaties, Sgouros moved against Athens, claiming that the city's inhabitants harboured a fugitive from justice. His men managed to take the city but the inhabitants, led by Choniates, continued to resist from the Acropolis despite a heavy bombardment with siege engines. Sgouros left the Acropolis under blockade and after torching Athens marched into Boeotia. Thebes was stormed, and Sgouros moved on into Thessaly. Near Larissa, he encountered Alexios III Angelos, who had fled the Crusader attack on Constantinople. In exchange for offering protection to the deposed ruler, he received the hand of Alexios's third daughter, Eudokia Angelina (her third marriage), and the title of despotes. Sgouros was well on his way to forming an independent state of his own in southern Greece, which had every chance of becoming, in the words of the medievalist John Van Antwerp Fine, "a lasting affair", until the arrival of the Crusaders.

=== Defeat and death ===
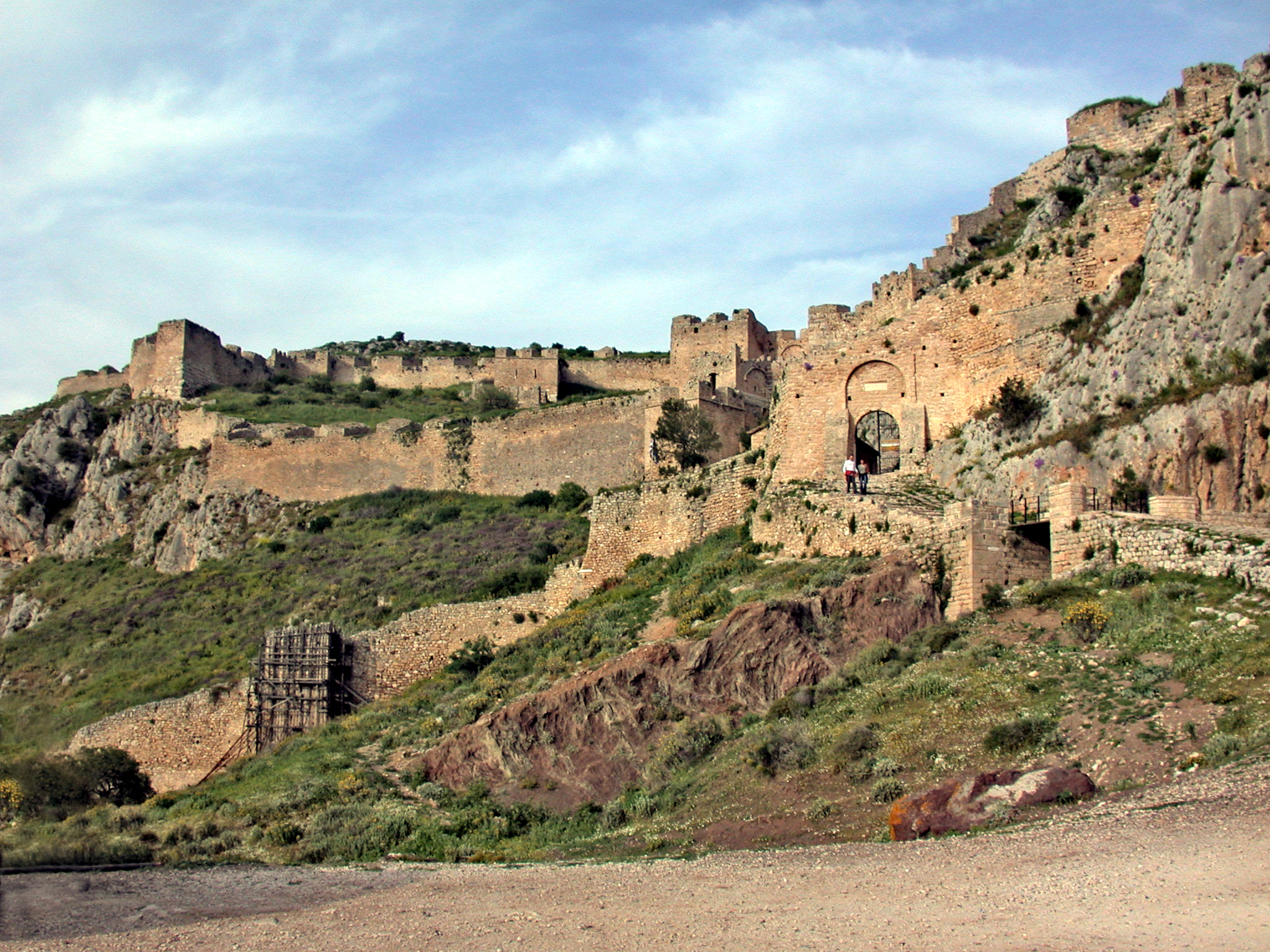
The entrance fortifications of the Acrocorinth citadel.

In the autumn of 1204, following their capture of Constantinople, the Crusaders under Boniface of Montferrat marched into Thessaly and headed south. Sgouros withdrew before the superior Crusader army. Initially he planned to make a stand in the pass of the Thermopylae, but he eventually retired to the Peloponnese, establishing a defence on the Isthmus of Corinth. The army of Boniface took Boeotia and Attica without resistance, and relieved the blockade of Athens, where Choniates surrendered the city to him. Boniface's first assault on Sgouros's defenses in the Isthmus was repulsed, but the second broke through, and by spring 1205 he controlled the countryside of the northeastern Peloponnese, while the fortified cities held out against him.

Sgouros himself withdrew and was blockaded in his stronghold, the well-fortified citadel of the Acrocorinth, in a siege that was to last five years. Sgouros's resistance was energetic, with sorties that harassed the besiegers. To tighten their siege, the Franks built two forts, one on the hill of Pendeskouphi and one on the eastern approaches. According to legend, Sgouros eventually despaired, and in 1208 he jumped off the high cliffs on his horse. Resistance was continued by a certain Theodore, but in the end, the citadel fell in 1210, removing one of the last major centers of resistance against the establishment of the Frankish Principality of Achaea.
