= Dobromir Chrysos =

Vlach warlord

Dobromir Chrysos (Macedonian: Добромир Хрс, Bulgarian: Добромир Хриз, Greek: Δοβρομηρός Χρύσος) was a Vlach warlord in eastern Macedonia during the reign of the Byzantine emperor Alexios III Angelos.

== Life ==
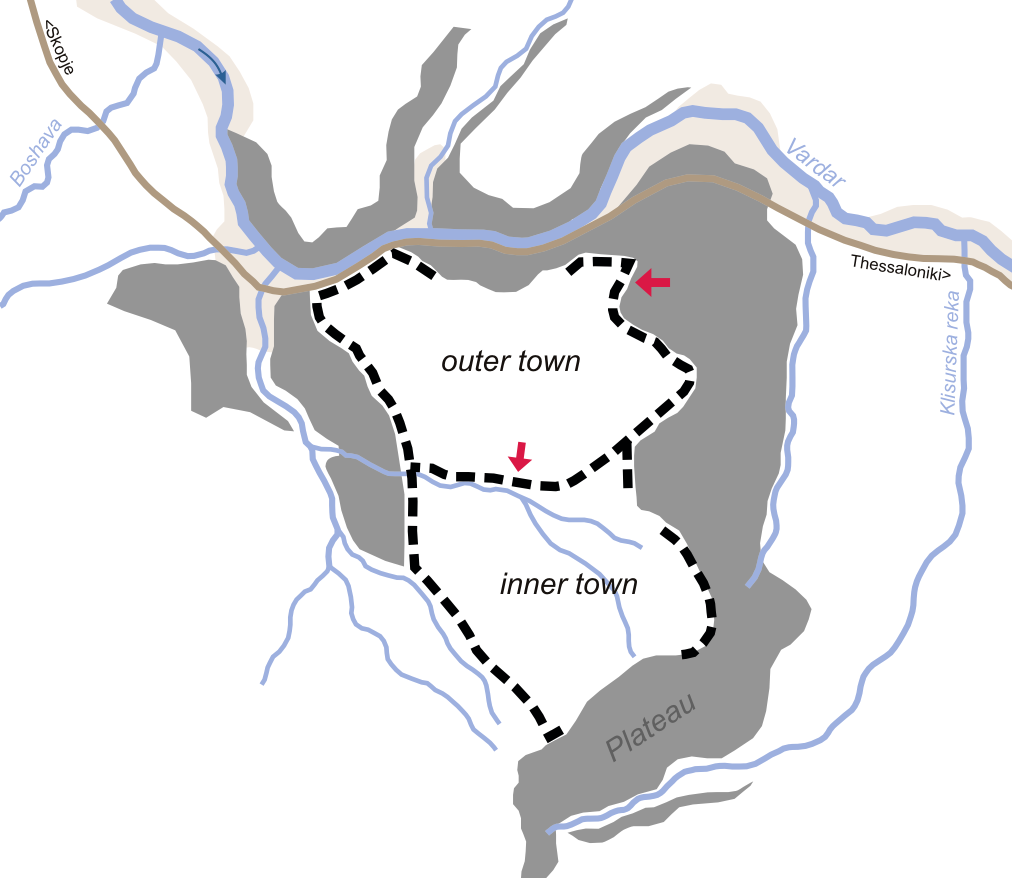
Plan of the fortress Prosek, seat of Dobromir Chrysos

Byzantine historian Niketas Choniates reported that Dobromir Chrysos was, despite his Slavic name, a Vlach by birth. Per Bulgarian researcher Dimitar Bechev, he was of mixed Slavic–Vlach origins.

Choniates reported that Chrysos and his 500 men were initially on Emperor Alexios III's side, but due to suspicion of leaning towards his fellow Vlachs and wanting to rule independently, he was imprisoned. After his release in 1196, he became Strumica's commander and by the end of the year started a revolt, raiding lands between the rivers Strymon and Vardar. Thus he became the ruler of local Vlachs and Bulgarian Slavs. He soon expanded his power over Prosek, where he had an advanced fortification built. Alexios launched a campaign against him in 1197 and laid siege for two months before returning to the capital Constantinople, allowing Chrysos to consolidate control over the area. After Alexios' unsuccessful campaign in the autumn of 1197, he sued for peace and recognized Chrysos' rights to the lands between the Strymon and Vardar, including Strumica and the fortress of Prosek. He was already married, but in order to cement an alliance with him the Emperor offered him a daughter of the Byzantine warlord Manuel Kamytzes. She was forced to divorce her husband and marry Chrysos in 1198. Presumably he took the name "Chrysos" upon marriage.

His father-in-law Kamytzes was captured by Ivanko during a campaign and Chrysos ended up paying the ransom for his release, with the former joining him in a revolt. Around 1201 they launched a series of fresh raids into Macedonia, Thessaly, central Greece, and the Peloponnese. Imperial diplomacy and Chrysos' marriage to Alexios III's granddaughter Theodora Angelina (who had previously been married to the rival leader, Ivanko) ended the campaign. Chrysos was then forced to accept a new treaty that allowed him to retain control only of Prosek and the surrounding countryside. According to historian Panos Sophoulis, his rule was largely based on terror and intimidation. Apparently, he had extorted the local population to build wealth for himself and his followers. His extra income may have been from tolls on travelers or robberies on the two routes near Prosek, Morava-Axios highway, and Via Egnatia. After 1201, he died and disappeared from the sources. Prosek appears to have been conquered by the Bulgarian emperor Kaloyan after 1202.

== Sources ==
Choniates, Nicetas (1984). O City of Byzantium, Annals of Niketas Choniatēs. Translated by Harry J. Magoulias. Detroit: Wayne State University Press. ISBN 0-8143-1764-2.

== Literature ==
- Томов, Т. Добромир Хриз, който владееше Просек и Струмица - Анамнеза, Т. 6 (2008), 97-114
