= John Komnenos (son of Andronikos I) =

- Emperor and Autocrat of the Romans

Byzantine co-emperor
- Reign: November 1183 – September 1185
- Born: September 1159
- Died: September 1185 (aged 26)
- Dynasty: Komnenos
- Father: Andronikos I Komnenos

John Komnenos (Greek: Ἰωάννης Κομνηνός, romanized: Iōánnēs Komnēnós; August/September 1159 – September 1185) was the second son of the Byzantine aristocrat, and emperor in 1183–1185, Andronikos I Komnenos. His father appointed him co-emperor over his older brother Manuel, but when Andronikos was deposed on 12 September 1185, John was also seized and killed.

== Early life ==
John was born to the future Andronikos I Komnenos and his first wife, whose name is unknown, in August or September 1159. He was conceived in early 1159, when his mother was in prison, and Andronikos visited her secretly one night. The young John probably accompanied his father when the latter was named military governor (doux) of Cilicia in 1166, as he definitely was with his father during his subsequent exile and long wanderings across the principalities of the Near East, while his older brother Manuel and his sister Maria remained in Constantinople. It was not until late 1178 or early 1179 that Andronikos was allowed back to the Byzantine capital, bringing John, along with his niece and mistress Theodora Komnene and their children, with him. At this point, John may have received the title of sebastos from his uncle, Emperor Manuel I Komnenos (r. 1143–1180).

After Manuel I died, John and his older brother Manuel sided with Manuel I's daughter, the kaisarissa Maria Komnene, against the regency of the young Alexios II Komnenos (r. 1180–1183), headed by Empress-dowager Maria of Antioch and another cousin, the protosebastos Alexios Komnenos. The conspiracy was uncovered, however, and both John and Manuel were imprisoned until the regency was overthrown by their father in April 1182.

== Co-emperor ==
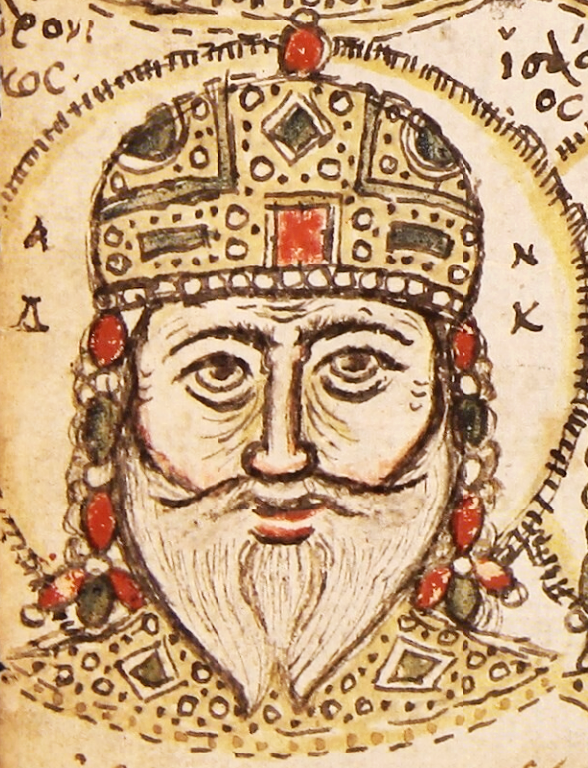
Miniature portrait of Andronikos I, from a 15th-century codex

When his father assumed the regency, John received an unspecified high title, but in November 1183, after Andronikos was crowned emperor and Alexios II was deposed and murdered, John was also named as co-emperor and heir apparent to his father. Andronikos' choice fell on John, rather than the older Manuel, because Manuel was known to object to his father's policies. John was considered more loyal, while furthermore his elevation to the throne adhered to the AIMA prophecy by having an emperor whose name started with "A" followed by one whose name (in Greek) started with "I".

While Manuel never made secret his disapproval for Andronikos' policies, John supported or tolerated them initially. When at last he criticized his father for his persecution of the aristocracy, according to Eustathius of Thessalonica, he received the rebuke that he and Manuel were "women", who could not rule securely until all the leading men of the state were eliminated, so that only the common people remained. According to the scholar Konstantinos Varzos, it is "without a doubt that the younger son was a much lesser man than the older Manuel". According to Niketas Choniates, one of Andronikos' leading ministers, the megas hetaireiarches Constantine Tripsychos, was accused by his bitter rival the logothetes tou dromou Stephen Hagiochristophorites of uttering disparaging remarks on John's character and qualities, comparing him with the jester Zintziphitzes, a common and vulgar man known in the taverns and streets of the capital. Though clearly slanderous, these accusations must have contained a kernel of truth, according to Varzos, for Tripsychos was duly demoted and imprisoned.

In 1185, the Italo-Norman King of Sicily William II launched an invasion of the Byzantine Empire, and his troops laid siege to the Empire's second city, Thessalonica. John was one of the commanders sent out by Andronikos to assist the city and confront the Normans, giving him command of troops in Philippopolis. Rather than face the hazards of war, John preferred to stay at Philippopolis hunting. According to the eyewitness account of Eustathius of Thessalonica, the besieged called and prayed upon "Good John" to come and save them, but in vain; after the city fell, the Normans mockingly repeated these pleas to the captive Thessalonians.

Finally, on 12 September 1185, a popular uprising in Constantinople overthrew Andronikos, who fled the city. On the same day, Manuel was captured and blinded. Shortly after, the news of Andronikos' fall reached Philippopolis. The army at once rose up, and John was seized and blinded, before he was killed.

== Bibliography ==
- Magoulias, Harry J. (2011). "Andronikos I Komnenos: A Greek Tragedy". Byzantina Symmeikta. 21: 101–136. doi:10.12681/byzsym.1032. ISSN 1791-4884.
- Varzos, Konstantinos (1984). Η Γενεαλογία των Κομνηνών [The Genealogy of the Komnenoi] (PDF) (in Greek). Vol. B. Thessaloniki: Centre for Byzantine Studies, University of Thessaloniki.
