= Timeline of the Latin Empire =

The timeline of the Latin Empire is a chronological list of events of the history of the Latin Empire—the crusader state that developed on the ruins of the Byzantine Empire after the Fourth Crusade in the 13th century.

== Background ==
=== Towards the Fourth Crusade ===
1054

- Spring. The Seljuk Sultan, Tughril, raids Byzantine territories.
- 16 July. East–West Schism: Pope Leo IX's legate, Humbert of Silva Candida, excommunicates Patriarch Michael I Cerularius, and the Patriarch excommunicates the Pope.

1071

- August 26. Battle of Manzikert: the Seljuk Sultan, Alp Arslan, defeats and captures the Byzantine Emperor Romanos IV Diogenes.

1071–1081

- The Seljuks seize large parts of Anatolia, taking advantage of Byzantine civil wars.

1073–1074

- Roussel de Bailleul, a Norman mercenary previously in Byzantine service, rules western Anatolia. The Byzantines could terminate his rule only with Seljuk support.

1080

- July. Pope Gregory VII authorizes the Norman duke of Apulia and Calabria, Robert Guiscard, to invade the Byzantine Empire to reinstate the dethroned Emperor Michael VII Doukas.

1082

- 21 February. Robert Guiscard occupies the Byzantine town of Dyrrachium, or Durazzo, on the eastern coast of the Adriatic Sea. He continues his military campaign towards Constantinople along the Via Egnatia.
- May. The Byzantine Emperor Alexios I Komnenos grants privileges to the Venetian merchants, including their exemption from specified taxes, in return for Venetian naval support against the Normans.

1083–1084

- The Venetians and the Byzantines force the Normans to abandon the Byzantine Empire.

1090s

- Western European mercenaries make up the majority of the Varangian Guard.

1095

- March. Emperor Alexios I's envoys seek Pope Urban II's assistance at the Council of Piacenza in raising mercenary troops to fight against the Seljuks.
- 27 November. Pope Urban I proclaims the First Crusade at the Council of Clermont for the liberation of the Eastern Christians and the Holy Land.

1096–1097

- Winter. Tens of thousands of crusaders march across the Byzantine Empire towards the Holy Land. Their conflicts with the Byzantines occasionally end with skirmishes. All crusader leaders, but Raymond IV, Count of Toulouse, swear fealty to Alexios I, promising to return to the Byzantines all lands that the Seljuks conquered from the Byzantines.

1097

- May–June. The Byzantines and crusaders lay siege to Nicaea. The Seljuk garrison surrender the town to the Byzantine general Manuel Boutoumites.

1098

- 3 June. The crusaders capture Antioch, a city that the Seljuks seized from the Byzantines in 1083.
- November. The crusader leaders acknowledge the right of Robert Guiscard's son, Bohemond, to rule Antioch, ignoring their oath to Emperor Alexios.

1101

- August–September. The Seljuks annihilate three crusading armies in Anatolia. The survivors baselessly blame the Byzantines for the catastrophe.

1108

- September. Treaty of Devol: Bohemond acknowledges Alexios I's suzerainty over the Principality of Antioch. Bohemond's lieutenant in Antioch, Tancred, does not implement the treaty.

1111

- Alexios I grants trading privileges to the Pisans, reducing custom duties and allowing them to establish a colony in Constantinople.

1119

- Alexios I's successor, John II Komnenos, does not confirm the Venetians' trading privileges, stating that they abused them.

1122–1125

- Doge Domenico Michiel personally leads the Venetian Crusade to the Kingdom of Jerusalem. While sailing towards and from the Holy Land, the Venetian fleet plunder Byzantine islands.

1126

- August. Emperor John II restores the Venetians' trading privileges.

1137

- Spring. John II conquers the Cilician plains from Antioch and replaces the Catholic bishops with Orthodox prelates.

1145

- 1 December. Pope Eugenius III proclaims the Second Crusade for the recovery of Edessa.

1147–1148

- Fearing of an anti-Byzantine French–Norman coalition, Emperor Manuel I Komnenos tries to convince King Louis VII of France to avoid Constantinople during his march to the Holy Land, but Louis VII ignores him. Godefroy de la Roche Vanneau, Bishop of Langres, urges Louis VII to conquer Constantinople in retaliation for the dismissal of the Catholic bishops in Cilicia and for the Byzantine attacks against Antioch, but the King refuses. Hunger forces the French crusaders to seize food from the Greeks in western Anatolia by force, provoking their counter-attacks. The Byzantine fleet carries Louis VII and his nobles to Antioch, but the Seljuks annihilate most common soldiers who are left behind in Anatolia. The crusaders blame the Byzantines for the failure of the Second Crusade.

1155

- Manuel I grants trading privileges to the Genoese.

1162

- Street fights among the Genoese, Pisans and Venetians in Constantinople. Manuel I bans the Genoese and Pisans from the empire, enabling the Venetians to monopolize the foreign trade.

1170–1171

- Manuel I allows the Genoese and Pisans to return to Constantinople. After the Venetians destroy the new Genoese quarter, Manuel I's orders the imprisonment of all Venetians and the confiscation of their ships and goods. The Venetian fleet plunders Aegean islands.

1180–1182

- Manuel I's widow, Maria of Antioch, assumes regency for their eleven-year-old son, Alexios II Komnenos. Her favoritism towards the Genoese and Pisans alienates the Byzantines. After Manuel I's cousin, Andronikos Komnenos, rose up against her in Paphlagonia, a popular uprising broke out in Constantinople. The mob massacre Pisan and Genoese merchants and Catholic priests, including the papal legate, Cardinal John.

1183

- September. Andronikos Komnenos is crowned Alexios II's co-emperor, but he soon had Alexios II murdered. He allows the Venetians to return to Constantinople.

c. 1184

- Emperor Andronikos I concludes an alliance with Saladin, Sultan of Egypt and Syria.

1184

- Manuel I's nephew, Isaac Komnenos rose up against Andronikos I and seizes Cyprus. Isaac Komnenos assumes the title emperor.

1185

- September. News of Norman troops advancing towards Constantinople cause panic. The mob proclaims Isaac II Angelos—Emperor Alexios I's great-grandson—emperor. Andronikos I is tortured to death.
- November. The brothers Theodore and Asen stir up the Bulgarians and the Vlachs into a rebellion against the Byzantines in the Balkan Mountains.

c. 1186

- Emperor Isaac II renews the alliance with Saladin.

1186

- Isaac II sends his fleet to recapture Cyprus. The Sicilian admiral Margaritus of Brindisi attacks the fleet and seizes eighty Byzantine ships (four-fifths of the imperial fleet).

1187

- February. Isaac II restores the Venetians' trading privileges and pays a compensation to them in return for their promise of naval support.
- 4 July. Battle of Hattin: Saladin annihilates the field army of the Kingdom of Jerusalem.
- 2 October. Saladin captures Jerusalem.
- 29 October. Pope Gregory VIII proclaims the Third Crusade against Saladin.

1188

- Isaac II's brother-in-law, Conrad of Montferrat, addresses a letter to Baldwin of Forde, Archbishop of Canterbury, from Tyre, accusing Isaac II of conspiring against the crusaders with Saladin.

1189–1190

- The Holy Roman Emperor, Frederick I Barbarossa, and Emperor Isaac II distrust each other during Frederick's crusade. Frederick is suspicious about Isaac's negotiations with Saladin and Isaac fears of a German attack on Constantinople. The German crusaders temporarily capture Philippopolis and Adrianople in Thrace before the two emperors conclude a peace treaty.

1191

- May. King Richard I of England conquers Cyprus during his crusade.

1192

- 2 September. Richard I and Saladin sign a three-year truce. The crusader states survive in the Outremer and the Christian pilgrims are allowed to visit the holy places, but Jerusalem remains under Muslim rule.

1195

- Good Friday. The Holy Roman Emperor, Henry VI, takes the crusading oath without waiting for Pope Celestine III's appeal for a new crusade. Henry threatens the Byzantines with an invasion if they do not contribute with 5,000 pounds of gold to his crusade.
- 8 April. Isaac II is dethroned, blinded and imprisoned by his brother, Alexios III Angelos.

1196

- Henry VI agrees to reduce the Byzantine contribution to 1,000 pounds of gold. Alexios III levies a special tax, the "German Tax", to cover the expenditure.

1197

- 28 September. Henry VI dies before departing for the crusade.

=== Fourth Crusade ===
1198

- 15 August. Pope Innocent III proclaims the Fourth Crusade.

1199

- 28 November. Theobald III, Count of Champagne, Louis I, Count of Blois, and Baldwin IX, Count of Flanders, take the crusading oath at a tournament at Asfeld. Their vassals follow their suit.

1200

- Summer. The crusader leaders meet at Compiègne to make preparations for the crusade.

c. 1200

- Revolts against Alexios III: his illegitimate cousin, Michael Komnenos Doukas makes raids in the valley of the Maeander River in western Anatolia with Seljuk support; the Anatolian aristocrat Theodore Mangaphas seizes the Thracesian Theme; Leo Sgouros rises up in the Peloponnese.

1201

- April. Doge Enrico Dandolo concludes a treaty with the crusader leaders' delegates. The Venetians contract to build a fleet to carry 4,500 knights, 9,000 squires and 20,000 footsoldiers for 85,000 marks. The crusaders and the Venetians also agree that they will divide all conquered lands equally between them.
- May. Innocent III forbids the crusaders and the Venetians to invade Christian lands when confirming their treaty. Theobald of Champagne, the designated commander of the crusading army, dies.
- August. Boniface I, Marquess of Montferrat is elected as the new commander of the crusading army.
- Autumn. Isaac II'son, Alexios Angelos, escapes from prison and a Pisan ship carries him to Italy.
- Winter. The young Alexios Angelos meets with his brother-in-law, Philip of Swabia, and Boniface of Montferrat. He seeks their support to regain his father's imperial throne from Alexios III.

1201/1202

- Alexios III concludes a peace treaty with the younger brother and successor of Theodore and Asen, Kaloyan of Bulgaria, establishing the Balkan Mountains as the frontier between the two countries.

1202

- Early. Alexios Angelos cannot convince Innocent III to acknowledge his claim to the Byzantine throne.
- 24 June. The Venetians complete the crusaders' fleet, but the crusader leaders can only pay 60% of the agreed price, because many crusaders departed for the Holy Land from other ports. Enrico Dandolo proposes a compromise, offering to delay the payment of the missing amount in return for the crusaders' support to conquer Zadar, a Dalmatian town accepting the suzerainty of Emeric, King of Hungary.
- 22 July. The crusader leaders accept Dandolo's offer. They also agree to invade Egypt after wintering in Dalmatia.
- 1 October. Innocent III prohibits the crusaders to besiege Christian towns, particularly Zadar.
- 16 November. Innocent III urges Alexios III to achieve the Church union and acknowledge the papal supremacy.
- 24 November. The crusaders capture and sack Zadar.
- c. 15 December. Innocent III forgives the crusaders for their attack on Zadar, but refuses to absolve the Venetians. The papal legate, Peter of Capua, departs the crusade for the Holy Land.

1203

- 1 January. Alexios Angelos's envoys offer 200,000 marks, 10,000 soldiers and the Church union in return for the crusaders' assistance against Alexios III. The crusaders (or Latins) accept the offer.
- April. Alexios Angelos joins the crusaders at Zadar.
- 6 July. Crusaders capture Galata and the Venetian fleet forces an entry to the Golden Horn.
- 17–18 July. The crusaders attack Constantinople and capture some towers. Alexios III flees the city. Isaack II is released and restored to the throne. He confirms his son's promises.
- 1 August. The younger Alexios is crowned his father's co-emperor as Alexios IV. He announces the Church union, but he can pay only 100,000 marks to the crusaders. He makes a new agreement with the crusaders, promising further payments to them in return for their support against Alexios III who still holds Thrace.
- Autumn. Clashes between the crusaders and the Greeks in Constantinople. The Catholics flee from Constantinople to seek asylum in the crusaders' camp. Alexios III's son-in-law, Theodore Laskaris flees to Bithynia (in western Anatolia).

1204

- January–February. Byzantine aristocrats and commoners are plotting against Isaac II and Alexios IV. Isaac II dies and the discontented Byzantines elect the crusaders' enemy, Alexios Doukas, or Alexios V, emperor. The new emperor had Alexios IV murdered. The new emperor refuses to pay the sum that Alexios IV promised to the crusaders and sends fire-ships to destroy their fleet.
- Spring. Greek landowners of the Opsician Theme acknowledge Theodore Laskaris as Alexios III's lieutenant.

== Latin Empire ==
=== Establishment ===
1204

- March. The crusader leaders and the Venetians make a pact about the conquest of the Byzantine Empire. They pledge to elect an emperor and a patriarch. They also make an agreement about the division of the booty and the conquered territories.
- 13 April. After the crusaders breach the walls of Constantinople, Alexios V and the Orthodox Patriarch, John X Kamateros escape to Thrace.
- 13–16 April. The crusaders sack Constantinople, seizing treasure valued more than 3,6 million hyperpyra. The Venetians receive more than 85% of the booty in compensation for the crusaders' debt.
- April. Boniface of Montferrat marries Isaac II's widow, Margaret of Hungary, to strengthen his claim to the imperial throne, but the Venetians do not support him. Kaloyan offers military assistance to the Latins in return for the division of Thrace, but the Latins arrogantly decline his offer.
- 9 May. Baldwin of Flanders is elected the first Latin Emperor of Constantinople.
- 16 May. Nivelon de Cherissy, Bishop of Soissons, crowns and anoints Baldwin I emperor in the Hagia Sophia. Greek courtiers and commoners attend the ceremony, because they are willing to acknowledge him as the lawful emperor, but he holds only Constantinople and the neighboring lands.
- May. Andronikos I's grandsons, Alexios and David Komnenos conquer Trebizond with the assistance of Queen Tamar of Georgia. Alexios assumes the title of emperor, establishing a Byzantine successor state, the Empire of Trebizond, in northeastern Anatolia. Bohemond IV of Antioch swears fealty to Baldwin's wife, Marie of Champagne, at Acre. Baldwin I grants Anatolia—still to be conquered—to Boniface in fief to placate him, but Boniface claims Thessalonica.
- May–June. Baldwin I invades Thrace, still held by the deposed emperors, Alexios III and Alexios V. Alexios V seeks an alliance with Alexios III, but Alexios III had him captured and blinded. Most Thracian towns yield to Baldwin I.
- August. Baldwin I captures Thessalonica, outraging Boniface who attacks Adrianople. Boniface offers his stepson—Emperor Isaac II's son—to the burghers of Adrianople as their ruler, but they refuse. Boniface sells his claim to Crete to the Venetians and appeals to the council of the crusader leaders against Baldwin I. Baldwin I and Boniface reach a compromise whereby Boniface is acknowledged as king of Thessalonica.
- September. A commission of 12 crusaders and 12 Venetians decide on the distribution of the Byzantine Empire, including territories still under the rule of Byzantine claimants. In accordance with their March pact, one-quarter of the land is assigned to the emperor, while the remaining territory is divided between the Venetians and the Latin aristocrats. The Venetian Thomas Morosini is elected the Latin Patriarch of Constantinople.
- October–November. Boniface invades Greece and captures Alexios III. Boniface grants Boeotia and Attica to a Burgundian knight, Othon de la Roche. Michael Komnenos Doukas deserts Boniface's army and flees to Arta (in Epiros). Michael takes command of the local Greeks' resistance, establishing the Byzantine successor state, now known as Despotate of Epiros.
- November. Coming from the Holy Land to the Latin Empire, a storm forces Geoffrey of Villehardouin to land at Modon. He concludes an alliance with a local Greek archon (or aristocrat) to conquer the Morea. Baldwin I's brother, Henry of Flanders, invades western Anatolia; Renier of Trit occupies Philippopolis; and Venetian troops capture Adrianople.
- 7 November. Innocent III confirms Baldwin I's imperial title. A papal legate crowns Kaloyan of Bulgaria king and ordains Basil as primate of the Bulgarian Church, ignoring Kaloyan's claims to the title of tsar (or emperor) for himself and to the rank of patriarch for Basil.
- December. Alexios V is publicly executed in Constantinople.

1204/1205

- Enrico Dandolo's nephew, Marco Sanudo, conquers islands in the Cyclades.

1205

- Early. Geoffrey of Villehardouin seeks Boniface's assistance for the conquest of the Morea. Boniface appoints William of Champlitte to accompany him back to the Morea. They conquer Elis and Messenia without facing resistance and allow the local Greek archons to keep their estates in fief.
- January. Boniface defeats Leon Sgouros and captures most towns in the northeastern Peloponnese.
- Spring. The Greek archons rose up in Thrace to defend their estates against the Latin aristocrats' claims. They seek assistance from Kaloyan who invades Thrace, forcing Baldwin I to withdraw the Latin troops from western Anatolia. Theodore Laskaris assumes the title of emperor, establishing a new Byzantine successor state, the Empire of Nicaea. A Venetian flotilla captures Durazzo, Corfu, Modon and Coron.
- March. Innocent III invalidates Morosini's uncanonical election, but appoints him to the patriarchate, granting him the right to crown kings and to alienate Church property.
- 14 April. Battle of Adrianople: Kaloyan annihilates Baldwin I's army. Baldwin is captured and the Latin aristocrats and Enrico Dandolo elect his brother, Henry, regent for him.
- May. Battle of Koundoura: Champlitte and Villehardouin defeat the united forces of Arcadian and Laconian Greeks and the Slavic tribe of Melingoi.
- June. While marching towards Thessalonica, Kaloyan besieges Serres. He offers a safe conduct to the defenders, but after they surrender, he had hundreds of townspeople captured. His act alienates many Greeks who desert his camp. The Byzantine aristocrats, Alexios Aspietes and Theodore Branas, expel the Latins from Philippopolis, but they deny to cede it to Kaloyan. Kaloyan lays siege to Thessalonica, but Boniface hurries back from the Peloponnese and releases his capital.
- Late Autumn. William of Champlitte assumes the title of Prince of Achaea.
- Autumn-Winter. Kaloyan captures Philippopolis and other Thracian towns. He orders the execution of their Greek leaders and sends thousands of captured Greeks to Bulgaria.
- 19 November. Innocent III sanctions the election of a Latin Archbishop of Patras, Antelmus, thus acknowledging the establishment of the first Catholic archdiocese outside Constantinople in the Latin Empire.

1206

- Early. The Thracian Greeks seek Henry of Flanders' assistance against Kaloyan.
- June–July. News about the death of Emperor Baldwin I's death in Bulgaria reach Constantinople.
- 20 August. Henry of Flanders is crowned the second Latin Emperor of Constantinople.
- September. Kaloyan captures Demotika and destroys its fortification. He captures thousands of Greeks, but Henry forces him to release them.
- Autumn. Kaloyan captures and destroys Thracian forts, facilitating his Cuman allies to pillage the region and capture local Greeks. Henry makes an alliance with Alexios I and David of Trebizond against Theodore I of Nicaea. Latin troops force Theodore I to abandon his invasion of Trebizond.

1206–1207

- Winter. Boniface recaptures Serres from the Bulgarians and fortifies Drama. Henry invades Anatolia and captures Nicomedia and Cyzicus from Nicaea.

1207

- Spring. Marco Sanudo swears fealty to Henry and assumes the title of Duke of Naxos. He and his (mainly) Venetian allies conquer new islands in the Cyclades and he grants them to his fellows in fief.
- April–May. Kaloyan and Theodore I make an alliance. Theodore I invades northwestern Anatolia, but Kaloyan unsuccessfully besieges Adrianople. Henry and Theodore I sign a two-year truce, acknowledging Theodore I's conquests in Bythinia, but also enabling Henry to retain some fortresses.
- August. Boniface pays homage for his kingdom to Henry at Cypsela.
- 4 September. Bulgarian raiders murder Boniface in a skirmish. Boniface's infant son, Demetrius, succeeds him under the regency of his mother, Margaret of Hungary.
- September–October. Kaloyan besieges Thessalonica, but he dies unexpectedly.
- Autumn. Hubert of Biandrate and other Lombard aristocrats elect a regency council to rule the Kingdom of Thessalonica. They intend to replace the underage Demetrius with his elder half-brother, William VI, Marquess of Montferrat. They also claim lands assigned to Venice, including Epirus. Henry summons Biandrate to Constantinople, but Biandrate does not obey to him.

1208

- Holy Week. Theodore I holds a Church council in Nicaea. The Orthodox prelates who attend the council elects Michael Autoreianos the new Ecumenical Patriarch.
- Eastern Sunday. Patriarch Michel crowns Theodore I emperor in Nikaea.
- Summer. Boril of Bulgaria invades Thrace. Henry makes an alliance with Boril's rebellious cousin, Alexius Slav. The Latins inflict a crushing defeat on the Bulgarians at Philippopolis and capture the town. Alexius Slav swears fealty to Henry through the traditional Byzantine ceremony of proskynesis (involving a kiss on Henry's feet and hand). Alexius marries Henry's illegitimate daughter.
- December. Henry marches to Thessalonica, but Biandrate allows him to enter the city only after he acknowledges the Thessalonican monarchs' suzerainty over Thessaly, Boeotia, Attica and Euboea. Henry and Margaret of Hungary made an alliance and force Biandrate and his allies to flee.

1209

- Early. Henry defeats a Lombard army at Drama.
- 1–2 May. First Parliament of Ravennika: the Thessalonican monarch's most vassals—including William of Champlitte, Geoffrey of Villeharduin and Othon de la Roche—pay homage to Henry.
- Early May. Henry forces the Lombard aristocrats who did not attend the parliament at Ravennika to swear fealty to him.
- Late Summer. Michael I of Epirus launches an invasion of Thessalonica.

=== Consolidation ===
1209–1210

- Winter. Henry forces Michael I to withdraw the Epirote troops from Thessalonican territories. He also captures territories in Epirus and Macedonia from Michael I and Michael I's Bulgarian ally, Strez.

1210

- 20 June. Michael I of Epirus acknowledges Venetian suzerainty and grants trading privileges to the Venetians.

1211

- Spring. Theodore I's troops besiege Constantinople, forcing Henry to return to his capital. Boril invades Thrace, but he cannot prevent Henry from reaching Constantinople. Henry persuades the Seljuk Sultan of Rum Kaykhusraw I to invade Nicaea and Theodore I abandons the siege of Constantinople to repel the Seljuks.
- October. Henry defeats Theodore I and occupies Bythinian fortresses.

1213

- Henry and Boril make peace and Henry marries Boril's stepdaughter (Kaloyan's daughter), Maria.
- Henry invades Nicaean territory and captures northwest Anatolia.
- Michael I captures Durazzo from the Venetians.

1214

- Latin and Bulgarian troops invade Serbia, but they could not capture Niš.

1214–1215

- Winter. Michael I is murdered. His brother, Theodore Komnenos Doukas, who succeeds him, adopt an expansionist foreign policy, aimed at the reconquest of Constantinople from the Latins.

1216

- Spring. Theodore I of Epirus conquers Ohrid and Pelagonia, establishing his control of the western part of the Via Egnatia. Henry assembles the Latin troops at Thessalonica in preparation for a campaign against Epirus.
- 11 June. Henry dies in Thessalonica. His kinsman, Conon de Béthune, is elected regent.

== Sources ==
- Fine, John V. A. Jr. (1994) [1987]. The Late Medieval Balkans: A Critical Survey from the Late Twelfth Century to the Ottoman Conquest. Ann Arbor, Michigan: University of Michigan Press. ISBN 978-0-472-10079-8.
- Jacoby, David (2017) [2008]. "The Latin Empire of Constantinople and the Frankish states". In Shepard, Jonathan (ed.). The Cambridge History of the Byzantine Empire, c. 500–1492. Cambridge University Press. pp. 759–778. ISBN 9781409410980.
- Lilie, Ralph-Johannes (1993) [1981]. Byzantium and the Crusader States 1096-1204. Oxford University Press. ISBN 0-19-820407-8.
- Lock, Peter (1995). The Franks in the Aegean, 1204–1500. Longman. ISBN 0-582-05139-8.
- Lock, Peter (2006). The Routledge Companion to the Crusades. Routledge. ISBN 9-78-0-415-39312-6.
- Nicol, Donald M. (1999) [1988]. Byzantium and Venice: A Study in Diplomatic and Cultural Relations. Cambridge University Press. ISBN 0-521-42894-7.
- Richard, Jean (2001) [1996]. The Crusades, c. 1071–c. 1291. Cambridge University Press. ISBN 978-0-521-62566-1.
- Treadgold, Warren (1997). A History of the Byzantine State and Society. Stanford, California: Stanford University Press. ISBN 0-8047-2630-2.
- Van Tricht, Filip (2011). The Latin Renovatio of Byzantium: The Empire of Constantinople (1204–1228). Leiden: Brill. ISBN 978-90-04-20323-5.
