= Manuel Komnenos (son of Andronikos I) =

- Sebastokrator of the Byzantine Empire
- Born: 1145; Constantinople (modern-day Istanbul, Turkey)
- Died: After 1185; Constantinople
- Spouse: Rusudan of Georgia
- Issue: Alexios Komnenos; David Komnenos
- Dynasty: Komnenoi
- Father: Andronikos I Komnenos
- Mother: Unknown

Manuel Komnenos (Greek: Μανουήλ Κομνηνός, romanized: Manouēl Komnēnos; 1145–1185?) was the eldest son of Byzantine emperor Andronikos I Komnenos, and the progenitor of the Grand Komnenos dynasty of the Empire of Trebizond. He served his uncle, Manuel I Komnenos, as a diplomatic envoy to the Russian principalities and the Kingdom of Jerusalem, but also helped his father escape imprisonment in Constantinople. His opposition to the regency of Empress-dowager Maria of Antioch and the protosebastos Alexios Komnenos landed him in prison, but he was released in April 1182, when his father stood poised to take power in the Byzantine capital.

Nevertheless, Manuel opposed his father's policy of persecuting the aristocracy, and refused to sanction or supervise the execution of Maria of Antioch. As a result, when Andronikos crowned himself emperor in 1183, Manuel was bypassed in the succession, and his younger brother John Komnenos was made co-emperor instead; Manuel received the title of sebastokrator. Despite his well-known opposition to Andronikos' more tyrannical policies, Manuel was blinded by Isaac II Angelos when the latter overthrew Andronikos in 1185. His subsequent fate is unknown, but his two sons, Alexios and David, went on to found the Empire of Trebizond in 1204, which was ruled by Manuel's descendants until its fall in 1461.

== Origin and early life ==
Manuel Komnenos was born in 1145, the firstborn son of the future Byzantine emperor Andronikos Komnenos (r. 1183–1185). The identity of his mother is unknown and disputed among scholars, (Note: Alexander Vasiliev suggested a Georgian royal origin for her, with Cyril Toumanoff further proposing that she was a sister of King George III (r. 1156–1184). Most modern scholars have rejected this suggestion, chiefly because the historian Niketas Choniates records her brother, the sebastos George, who was evidently a Byzantine official. Historian Michel Kuršankis suggests that this sebastos was the megas hetaireiarches George Palaiologos, and glosses the Turkish name Kir Luga assigned to him in an anonymous Turkish history as "Palaiologos". The Greek scholar Konstantinos Varzos and the French scholars Jean-Claude Cheynet and Jean-François Vannier, however, reject this as George Palaiologos was dead by 1167/70, long before the events that the sebastos George is associated with by Choniates. Cheynet and Vannier suggest in turn that Luga might be glossed as "Doukas" instead.) but she was most likely a member of the high Byzantine aristocracy. Whatever her origin, Manuel was of high birth: his paternal grandfather, Isaac, was a younger son of the founder of the Komnenian house, Alexios I Komnenos (r. 1081–1118) and Empress Irene Doukaina.

At a young age, Manuel received the high court rank of sebastos from his uncle, Emperor Manuel I Komnenos (r. 1143–1180). The Emperor was of an age with Manuel's father, and the two had grown up together. Manuel I cherished this friendship and would always be partial to Andronikos, even though the latter, like his own father, was a highly ambitious man who coveted the throne. His ambition, plotting with foreign powers, rumours of attempting to assassinate Manuel I, and above all his scandalous affair with his niece Eudokia (a daughter of Manuel I's brother, the sebastokrator Andronikos) brought Manuel's father into trouble, and in 1155, he was imprisoned by the Emperor in the dungeons of the Great Palace of Constantinople. Manuel is first mentioned in the sources in 1164, when he helped his father escape his imprisonment. Andronikos fled to Galicia, but soon the Emperor pardoned him and allowed him to return to Constantinople.

== Under Manuel I Komnenos ==
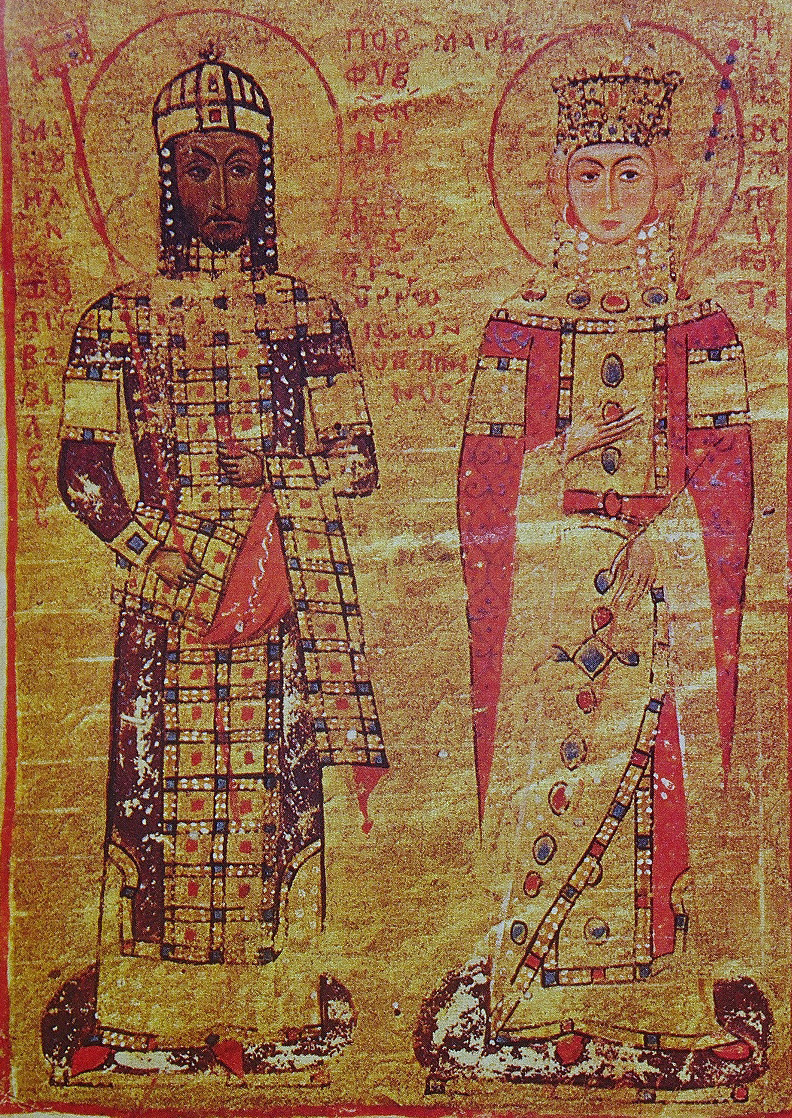
Miniature of Manuel's uncle, Emperor Manuel I Komnenos, and his second wife, Maria of Antioch (from a manuscript now in the Vatican Library)

Some modern scholars also identify Manuel with the namesake who was entrusted in c. 1165 with a diplomatic mission to the Russian princes Rostislav I of Kiev and Mstislav Isyaslavich of Volhynia, as part of Emperor Manuel I's preparations for war against Stephen III of Hungary. According to the contemporary historian John Kinnamos, the mission was a success, as the Russian princes were flattered by the high rank of the imperial envoy: both rulers agreed to maintain friendly relations with Byzantium. Mstislav of Volhynia even promised to send troops, while Rostislav of Kiev also agreed to accept the appointment of the Byzantine bishop John IV as Metropolitan of Kiev and all Rus'. It also appears that the embassy managed to turn the neighbouring ruler of Galicia, Yaroslav Osmomysl, who was tied to Stephen III by marriage, towards friendship with Byzantium, and adopting a neutral stance in the oncoming Byzantine–Hungarian conflict.

In 1166, Manuel's mother died, and he had her buried in the Monastery of Angourion. In the next year, he was a member of the high-ranking mission that accompanied his niece Maria Komnene to the Kingdom of Jerusalem for her wedding to King Amalric at Tyre on 29 August 1167. His life during the remainder of Manuel I's reign is obscure. According to a Georgian chronicler, when Andronikos sojourned in the Georgian royal court at Tiflis c. 1170, he was "accompanied by his wife, of dazzling beauty, by his sons, and those of his sister". This would most likely indicate the presence of Andronikos' mistress Theodora Komnene and their two children, but the plural "sons" leaves open the possibility that Manuel followed his father in his wanderings during his exile. Modern historians are doubtful about the accuracy of this account due to the ambiguity of its wording. In 1180, shortly before his death, Emperor Manuel I was reconciled with Andronikos: after swearing an oath of loyalty to the Emperor and his offspring, Andronikos was pardoned and allowed to serve as governor at Oinaion in the Pontus region, in northern Asia Minor. As a guarantee of his good behaviour, however, Manuel and his legitimate full-siblings, John and Maria, remained in Constantinople.

== Under the regency of Maria of Antioch ==
According to Varzos, it was probably after the death of Emperor Manuel I in 1180, that Manuel married the Georgian princess Rusudan, daughter of King George III. Given his age, Rusudan was possibly his second wife, or alternatively, if the match was arranged by his father during his stay at Tiflis, he had remained unwed to honour that pledge.

Manuel and his brother were among the nobility who sided with Manuel I's daughter, the Kaisarissa Maria Komnene, against the regency of Manuel I's underage son, Alexios II Komnenos (r. 1180–1183), headed by Empress-dowager Maria of Antioch and another cousin, the protosebastos Alexios Komnenos. The conspiracy was uncovered, however, and after a trial headed by Theodore Pantechnes, John and Manuel and other conspirators were imprisoned (February 1182). Taking advantage of the troubles in the capital, Andronikos rose in revolt and marched on Constantinople. After defeating the loyalists under Andronikos Doukas Angelos near Nicomedia, Andronikos advanced up to Chalcedon, across the Bosporus from Constantinople. The increasing number of defections to the rebel culminated when the megas doux (commander-in-chief of the navy) Andronikos Kontostephanos and the fleet went over to Andronikos. A revolt overthrew the regency in late April, the protosebastos was taken prisoner, and those imprisoned by him, including Manuel and John, were set free.

== Under Andronikos I ==
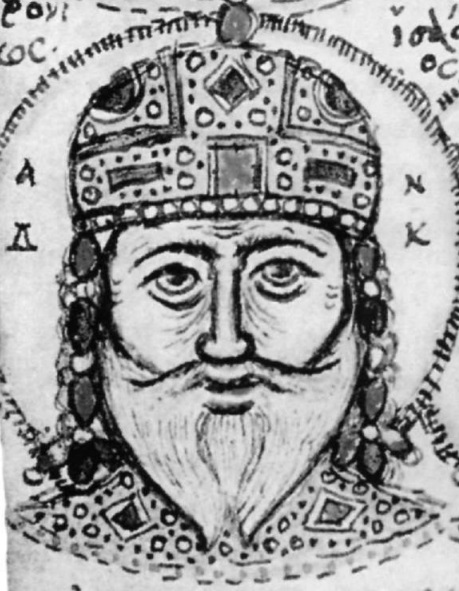
Miniature portrait of Andronikos I (from a 15th-century codex containing a copy of the Extracts of History by Joannes Zonaras)

Released, Manuel and his brother, and Andronikos' partisans, took over the palace and managed the government in his name. In mid-May Andronikos himself crossed the Bosporus and entered Constantinople, assuming power as regent for Alexios II. The contemporary official and historian, Niketas Choniates, writes critically of Andronikos' subsequent purge of the officialdom and the undiscerning award of offices to his supporters, as well as reporting that Andronikos "promoted his own sons" in the process. However, as a member of the high aristocracy nurtured in the court ethos of Manuel I, Manuel quickly came to oppose his father's policies, which aimed to break the power of the palace nobility and the great landowners. The first act of public opposition was his refusal, along with his maternal uncle, the sebastos George, to vote in the Senate for the execution of the Empress-dowager Maria of Antioch in August 1183, or to preside over the deed. According to Choniates, this refusal stunned Andronikos, but only served to postpone the execution for a few days.

Following the execution of the Empress-dowager, Andronikos assumed the imperial title in September, and within a month had eliminated the young Alexios II. Along with the patriarch Basil Kamateros, whom he had appointed, Andronikos then crowned his younger son John as co-emperor. Although widely acknowledged as more capable than his brother, Manuel was bypassed due to his opposition, although officially his father justified this choice with following the AIMA prophecy. Nevertheless, as the emperor's son he still received the high title of sebastokrator. His opposition became even more marked in August 1185, during the crisis caused by the Norman invasion of the Empire. Public hostility to the Emperor increased as the Normans advanced, and, in order to stifle dissent, Andronikos and his supporters in the Senate passed a law that would condemn to death not only those currently imprisoned, but also their families. Manuel was entrusted with carrying it out, but refused to, except by direct imperial warrant. He condemned the edict as illegal and immoral, as it would effectively put the entire populace, as well as many foreigners residing in the Empire, under the death penalty. This opposition delayed the edict's implementation, and Andronikos' downfall shortly after meant that it was never enforced. It was found among his papers after his death. At the same time, Manuel still retained a measure of influence over his father, as shown when he successfully pleaded for the life and rank of his cousin, David, the doux (governor) of Thessalonica, who was being besieged there by the Normans.

== Blinding and subsequent fate ==
During the popular uprising that brought Isaac II Angelos (r. 1185–1195, 1203–1204) to power on 11–12 September 1185, Andronikos for a time held the Great Palace against the urban mob. Left with a handful of companions, he realized that resistance was doomed, and tried to negotiate, offering to step down in favour of Manuel, rather than the co-emperor John, but the mob angrily refused, cursing both Andronikos and Manuel. Soon after, the mob broke into the palace precinct, and Andronikos, taking only his wife and mistress along, fled the city by ship. He was captured, mutilated, publicly humiliated and executed a few days later. Manuel too was arrested and blinded, even though, according to Choniates, "he in no way assented to his father's crimes and that this was well known" both to the common people and Isaac II. As Varzos writes, the most likely reason for this measure was not only in satisfying the mob's demand for vengeance on Andronikos and his sons, but also in Andronikos' desperate offer to hand over the crown to Manuel, which marked him as a potential rival to Isaac II. The same fate befell Manuel's brother, the co-emperor John.

Manuel's subsequent fate, or the date of his death, are unknown. The fate of his two infant sons, Alexios and David, is also obscure for many years: they may have fled Constantinople during the turmoil of Andronikos' deposition and taken to their maternal relatives in Georgia, but other scholars maintain that they remained unmolested in Constantinople, and left the city only after the failed uprising of Alexios' father-in-law, John Komnenos the Fat, in 1200/1, or even as late as the first siege of Constantinople by the Fourth Crusade in July 1203. With Georgian assistance, the two brothers captured the region of the Pontus in March–April 1204. While Alexios established himself at Trebizond and assumed the imperial title, David moved on to capture Paphlagonia, which he ruled until his death in 1212, when the region was annexed by the Empire of Nicaea. The Empire of Trebizond continued to be ruled by Manuel's descendants, the Grand Komnenoi, until it fell to the Ottoman Empire in 1461.

Based on a much-faded inscription in a tower in the city walls of Trebizond, the Russian Byzantinist Fyodor Uspensky suggested that perhaps the tower housed the tomb of Manuel, whose body (and that of Andronikos I) may have been brought to the city by his sons.

== Sources ==
- Brand, Charles M. (1968). Byzantium Confronts the West, 1180–1204. Cambridge, Massachusetts: Harvard University Press. LCCN 67-20872.
- Cheynet, Jean-Claude; Vannier, Jean-François (1986). Études Prosopographiques [Prosopographic Studies] (in French). Paris: Publications de la Sorbonne. ISBN 978-2-85944-110-4. OCLC 575241198.
- Choniates, Nicetas (1984). O City of Byzantium, Annals of Niketas Choniatēs. Translated by Harry J. Magoulias. Detroit: Wayne State University Press. ISBN 0-8143-1764-2.
- Kazhdan, Alexander, ed. (1991). The Oxford Dictionary of Byzantium. Oxford and New York: Oxford University Press. ISBN 0-19-504652-8.
- Kuršankis, Michel (1977). "L'Empire de Trébizonde et la Géorgie" [The Empire of Trebizond and Georgia]. Revue des études byzantines (in French). 35 (1). ISSN 0766-5598. OCLC 4794708241.
- Toumanoff, Cyril (1940). "On the Relationship between the Founder of the Empire of Trebizond and the Georgian Queen Thamar". Speculum. 15 (3): 299–312. doi:10.2307/2855207. JSTOR 2855207. S2CID 162584594.
- Varzos, Konstantinos (1984). Η Γενεαλογία των Κομνηνών [The Genealogy of the Komnenoi] (PDF) (in Greek). Vol. A2. Thessaloniki: Centre for Byzantine Studies, University of Thessaloniki.
- Varzos, Konstantinos (1984). Η Γενεαλογία των Κομνηνών [The Genealogy of the Komnenoi] (PDF) (in Greek). Vol. B. Thessaloniki: Centre for Byzantine Studies, University of Thessaloniki.
- Vasiliev, A. A. (1936). "The Foundation of the Empire of Trebizond (1204–1222)". Speculum. 11 (1): 3–37. doi:10.2307/2846872. JSTOR 2846872. S2CID 162791512.
