= AIMA prophecy =

12th-century Byzantine prophecy

The AIMA prophecy was a prophecy current during the reign of the Byzantine emperor, Manuel I Komnenos (r. 1143–1180), and at the same time an example of a medieval contrived acronym.

It foretold that the initial letters of the names of the emperors of the Komnenos dynasty would spell aima (αἷμα), the Greek word for "blood". The emperors of the dynasty had been, in order, Alexios I Komnenos (r. 1081–1118) (alpha), Ioannes II Komnenos (r. 1118–1143) (iota), and Manuel I (mu) (whose succession was unexpected since he was the fourth son of Ioannes). Because of his belief that his successor's name would have to start with the letter alpha, Manuel had the name Alexios bestowed on Béla, the fiancé of his daughter Maria and his designated heir from 1168 to 1169, when his second wife bore Manuel a son, who was named again in accordance with the prophecy as Alexios II Komnenos (r. 1180–1183), rather than Ioannes after his paternal grandfather, as was customary among the Byzantines. Manuel also gave the name to at least one and perhaps two of his own illegitimate sons.

The reign of Alexios II lasted only three years, before he was deposed and killed by his cousin, Andronikos I Komnenos (r. 1183–1185), with whom, apparently, the AIMA sequence began again. In accordance with this, Andronikos would be succeeded in turn by an emperor whose name began with the letter iota. For that reason, he bypassed his firstborn son Manuel Komnenos in favour of the younger Ioannes, who was crowned co-emperor in 1184. Andronikos also feared his throne would be usurped by another cousin, Isaac Komnenos of Cyprus. Stephen Hagiochristophorites, the Logothete of the Drome, suspected a different Isaac, Isaac II Angelos (r. 1185–1195, 1203–1204), who had been seen in Constantinople. On September 11, 1185 Hagiochristophorites visited Isaac Angelos at his hideout. Isaac Angelos slew Hagiochristophorites with his sword and fled to Hagia Sophia seeking sanctuary. In the ensuing uprising, Isaac was crowned emperor, while Andronikos was overthrown and killed a few days later.

The AIMA line continued, however, from Andronikos' eldest son Manuel to his own descendants—the only male-line branch of the Komnenoi to survive the 12th century—the "Grand Komnenoi" emperors of Trebizond: Andronikos I, Ioannes as co-emperor, Manuel, who would have been the legitimate successor, and Manuel's son Alexios I Megas Komnenos (r. 1204–1222), founder of the Empire of Trebizond. The sequence re-appears again with Andronikos I Gidos (r. 1222–1235), Ioannes I Axouchos (r. 1235–1238), Manuel Megas Komnenos (r. 1238–1263), and Andronikos II Megas Komnenos (r. 1263–1266).

The original sequence of emperors fulfilling the AIMA prophecy
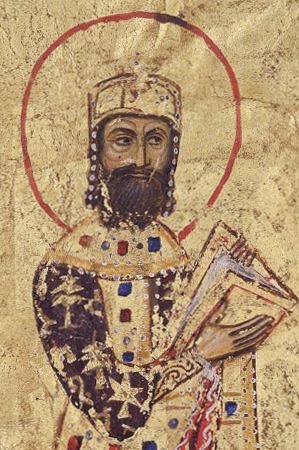
Alexios I Komnenos

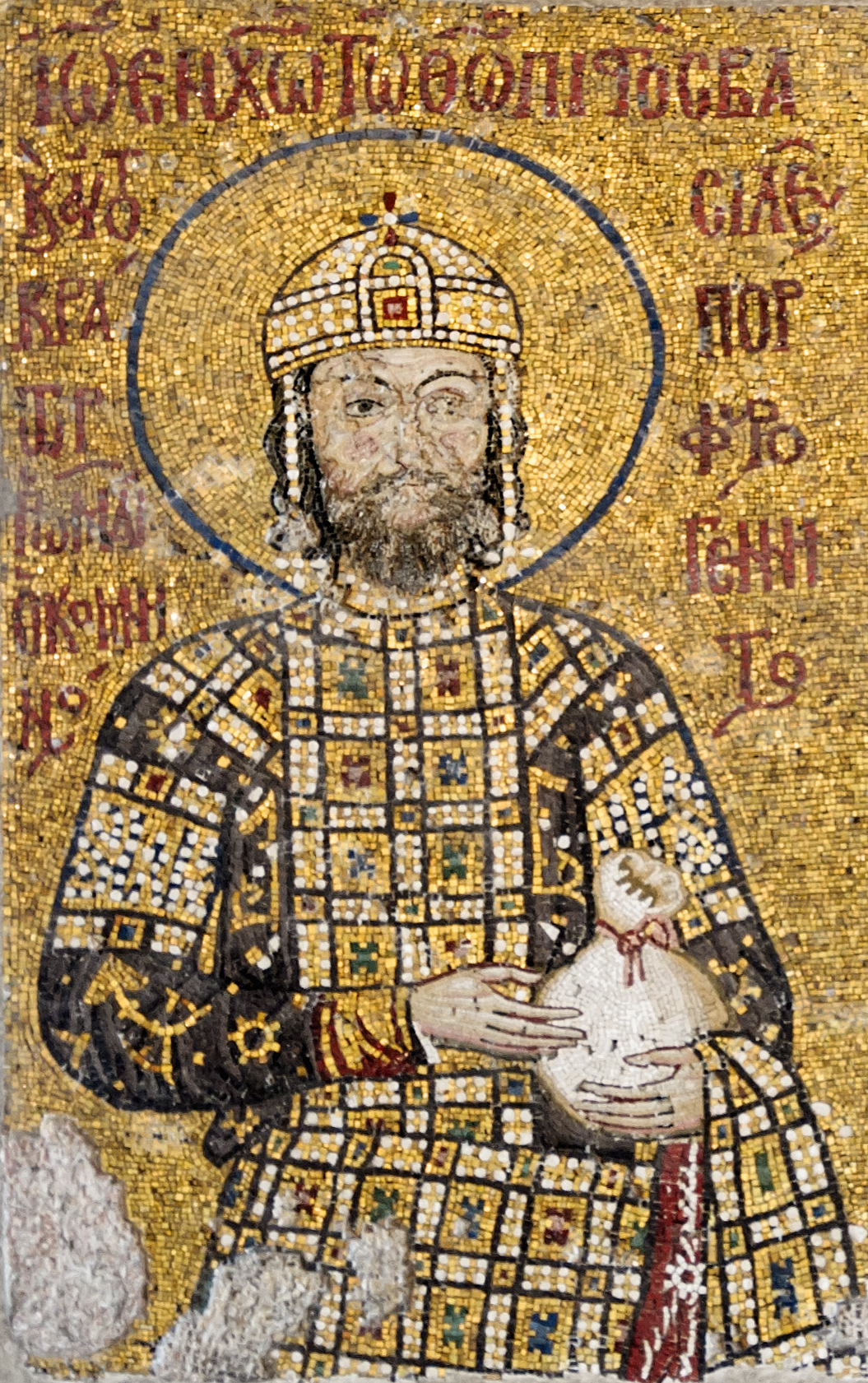
Ioannes II Komnenos

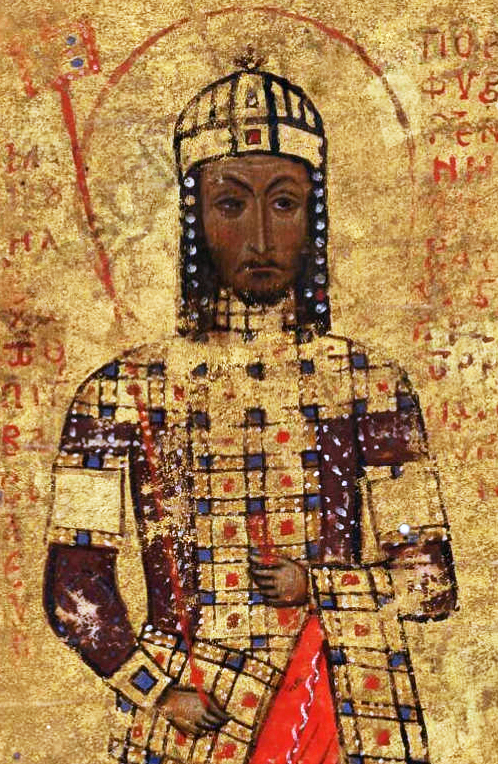
Manuel I Komnenos

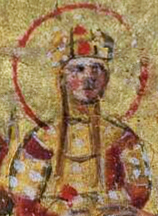
Alexios II Komnenos (Note: The identification of this figure from Vat. Gr. 1851 as Alexios II is by Ioannis Spatharakis. Other historians variously identify him as a young Andronikos IV Palaiologos or Andronikos II Palaiologos.)

== Sources ==
- Bryer, A.A.M. (1993). "Family Planning in Trebizond: The AIMA of the Grand Komnenoi". In Langdon, J.S. (ed.). To Hellenikon. Studies in Honour of Speros Vryonis, Jr., v. 1: Hellenic Antiquity and Byzantium. Artistide D. Caratzas. pp. 85–90. ISBN 0892415126.
- Magdalino, Paul (2002) [1993]. The Empire of Manuel I Komnenos, 1143–1180. Cambridge: Cambridge University Press. ISBN 0-521-52653-1.
- Shukurov, Rustam (1995). "AIMA: The blood of the Grand Komnenoi". Byzantine and Modern Greek Studies. 19: 161–181. doi:10.1179/030701395790836630. S2CID 162901823.
- Varzos, Konstantinos (1984a). Η Γενεαλογία των Κομνηνών [The Genealogy of the Komnenoi] (PDF) (in Greek). Vol. A. Thessaloniki: Centre for Byzantine Studies, University of Thessaloniki. Archived from the original (PDF) on 2014-02-03.
- Varzos, Konstantinos (1984b). Η Γενεαλογία των Κομνηνών [The Genealogy of the Komnenoi] (PDF) (in Greek). Vol. B. Thessaloniki: Centre for Byzantine Studies, University of Thessaloniki. Archived from the original (PDF) on 2016-03-03.
- Varzos, Konstantinos (1988). "La politique dynastique des Comnènes et des Anges, la prédiction AIMA (Sang) et l'héritage des Grands Comnènes de Trebizonde et de Anges-Comnènes-Doukas d'Epire face aux Lascarides de Nicée". Jahrbuch der Österreichischen Byzantinistik (in French). 32 (2): 357–358. ISSN 0378-8660.
