= Apheleia =

Greek deity of ease, simplicity and primitivity

In Greek mythology, Apheleia (Ἀφέλεια, Ancient Greek: [afélei̯a]) was the spirit and personification of ease, simplicity and primitivity in the good sense, "the good old days". According to Eustathius, she had an altar at the Acropolis of Athens and was honored as a nurse of Athena.

== Sources ==
- Realencyclopädie der Classischen Altertumswissenschaft, Band I, Halbband 2, Alexandrou-Apollokrates (1894), s. 2175, u. Apheleia (German)
