= AIMA =

AIMA may refer to:

- AIMA prophecy on the Komnenian family in the Byzantine Empire
- All India Management Association
- Artificial Intelligence: A Modern Approach, standard university textbook on Artificial Intelligence
- Australian Institute of Multicultural Affairs, an Australian government agency from 1979 to 1986
