= Siege of Trebizond =

Siege of Trebizond may refer to:

- Siege of Trebizond (1205–1206), a siege by the Seljuq Turks
- Siege of Trebizond (1222–1223), a siege by the Seljuq Turks
- Siege of Trebizond (1282), a siege by the Georgians
- Siege of Trebizond (1461), a siege by the Ottoman Turks
