= Sack of Thessalonica (1185) =

Invasion of the Byzantine city by the Normans

Coordinates: 40°39′N 22°54′E

- Part of the Third Norman invasion of the Balkans
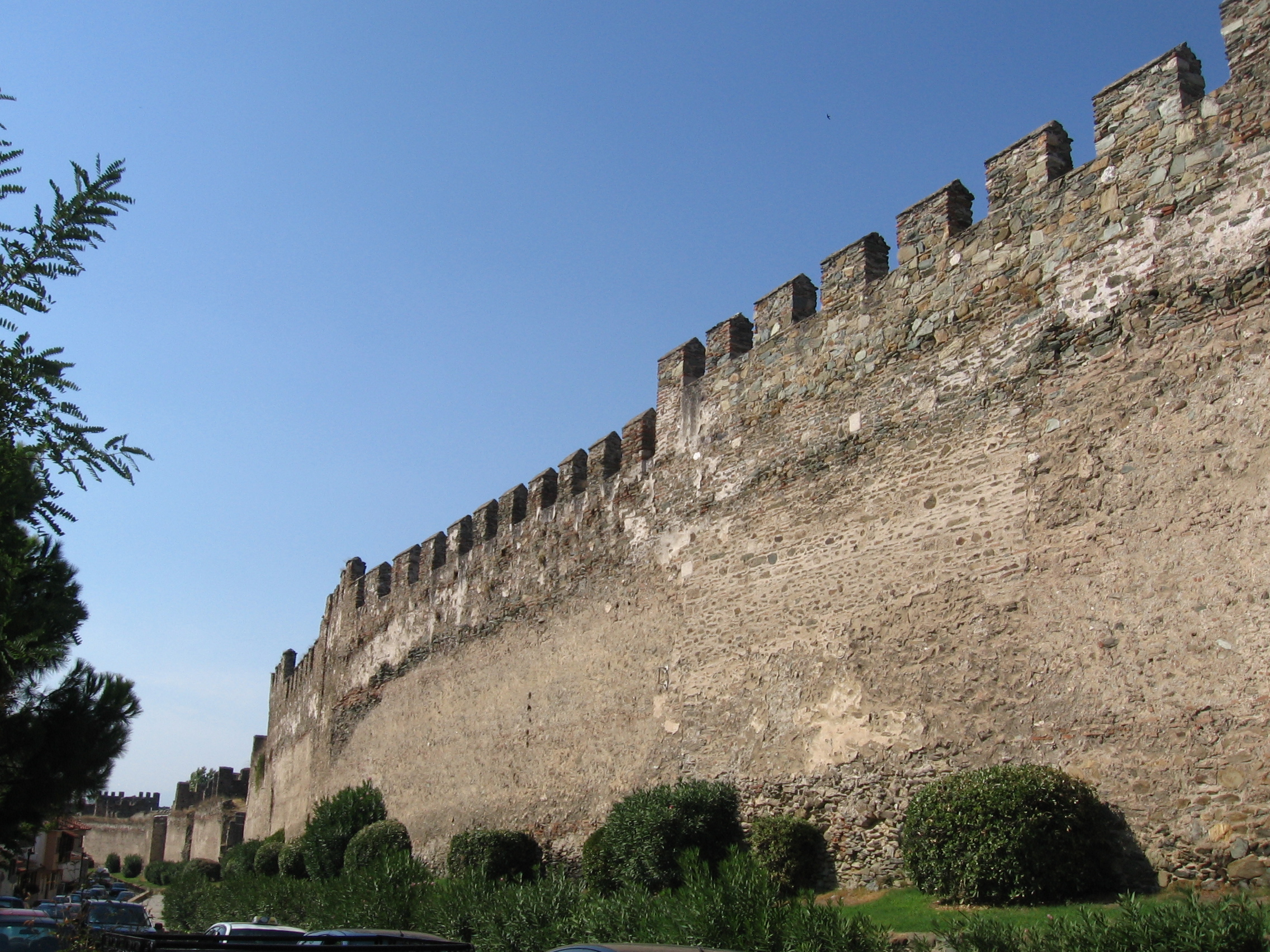
- The walls of Thessalonica
Date	9–24 August 1185
Location	Thessalonica (now Thessaloniki, Macedonia, Greece)
Result	Sicilian victory; Thessalonica sacked

Belligerents
Byzantine Empire: Alan and Georgian mercenaries	Kingdom of Sicily

Commanders and leaders
David Komnenos †; John Maurozomes †; Theodore Choumnos	Count Baldwin; Count Richard of Acerra; Count Tancred of Lecce

Strength
Unknown	80,000 men 200 ships

Casualties and losses
7,000 soldiers and civilians	3,000 soldiers

The sack of Thessalonica in 1185 by Normans of the Kingdom of Sicily was one of the worst disasters to befall the Byzantine Empire in the 12th century.

== Background ==
The stated goal of the Sicilian expedition, sent by William II of Sicily, was to replace Andronikos Komnenos with a Byzantine pretender who was claiming to be the deposed Alexios II. This was in retaliation to the Byzantine Emperor destabilizing his dynasty in Sicily. William had also supported Isaac Komnenos of Cyprus before this.

Some sources also report that William II was motivated by an alleged incident in which Manuel Komnenos had humiliated William. In the incident, William accepted a proposal to marry Manuel's daughter Maria, but the union was never realized in the last moment, likely because Frederick I offered the Byzantine Emperor a better deal. Wiliam was humiliated by fruitlessly waiting in Taranto for his wife to arrive for days.

== Siege ==
David Komnenos, the governor, had failed to prepare for the siege and banned defenders from disrupting Norman siege works, hindering the city's defense. The Byzantine relief armies failed to coordinate their efforts, and only two forces, under Theodore Choumnos and John Maurozomes, actually came to the city's aid. In the event, the Normans undermined the city's eastern wall, opening a breach through which they entered the city. They slaughtered the defenders and proceeded to sack the city. The conquest degenerated quickly into a full-scale massacre of the city's inhabitants, with estimates suggesting that around 7,000 to 8,000 corpses were found afterwards. The siege is extensively chronicled by the city's archbishop, Eustathius of Thessalonica, who was present in the city during and after the siege.

== Aftermath ==
The Normans occupied Thessalonica until mid-November, when, following their defeat at the Battle of Demetritzes, they evacuated it. After emperor Andronikos Komnenos's massacre of the Latins in Constantinople in 1182, the massacre of the Thessalonians deepened the rift between Western Christianity and Eastern Christianity. It also directly led to the deposition and execution of the unpopular Emperor Andronikos and the rise to the throne of Isaac II Angelos.

== Sources ==
- Brand, Charles M. (1968). "The Norman Threat: 1185". Byzantium Confronts the West, 1180–1204. Cambridge, Massachusetts: Harvard University Press. pp. 160–175. LCCN 67-20872.
- Magoulias, Harry J., ed. (1984). O City of Byzantium. Annals of Niketas Choniates. Detroit: Wayne State University Press. pp. 164–171, 175–176. ISBN 0-8143-1764-2.
- Stephenson, Paul (2000). "The Norman Invasion, 1185–1186". Byzantium's Balkan Frontier: A Political Study of the Northern Balkans, 900–1204. Cambridge: Cambridge University Press. pp. 284–288. ISBN 0-521-77017-3.
