= Stephen Hagiochristophorites =

Byzantine official (c. 1130 – 1185)

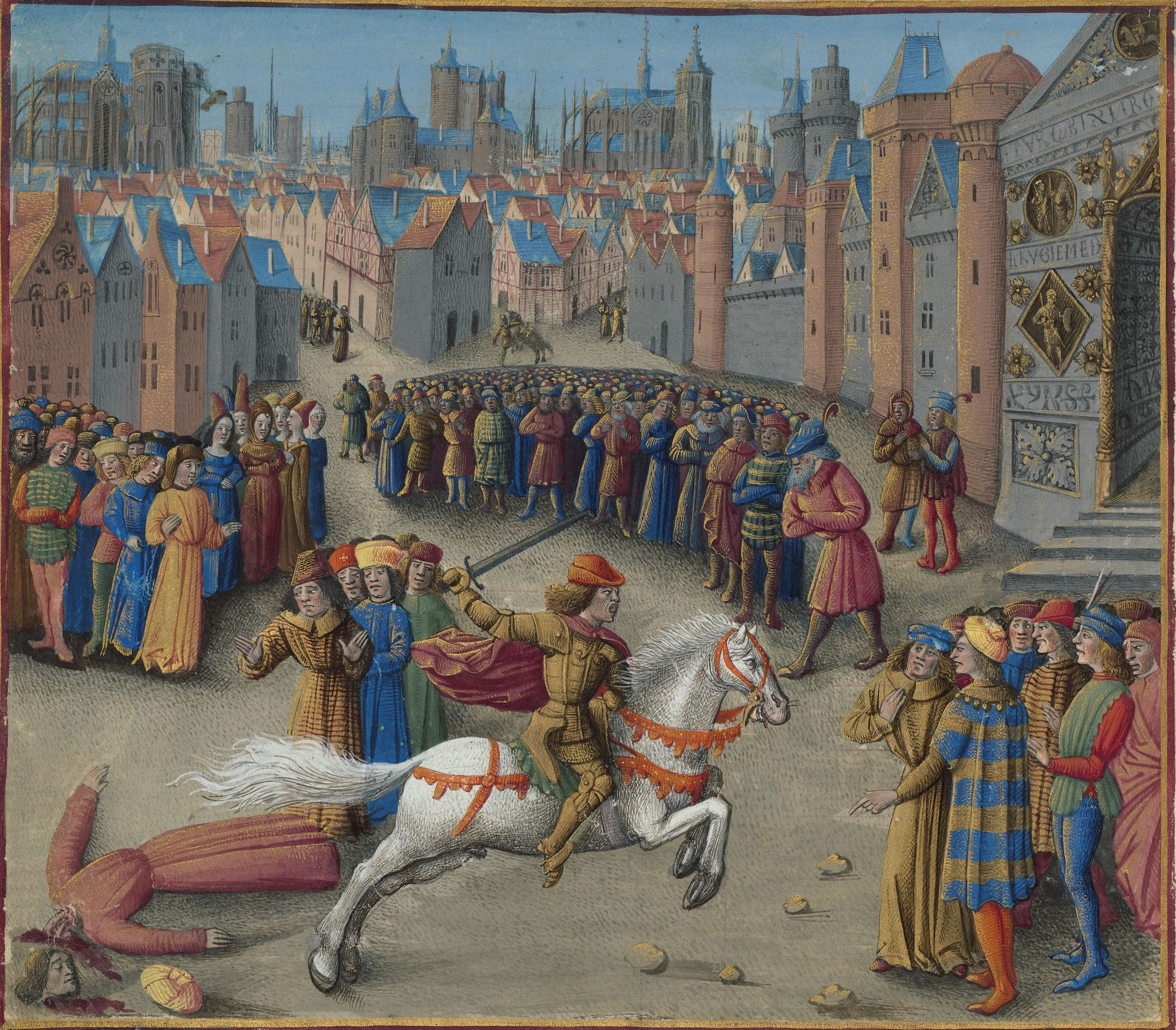
Killing of Hagiochristophorites, miniature by Jean Colombe in Les Passages d'outremer (c. 1473), BNF

Stephen Hagiochristophorites (Greek: Στέφανος Ἁγιοχριστοφορίτης, romanized: Stephanos Hagiochristophorites; c. 1130 – 11 September 1185) was the most powerful member of the court of Byzantine emperor Andronikos I Komnenos (ruled 1183–1185). He was killed while trying to arrest Isaac II Angelos, who subsequently deposed and replaced Andronikos.

== Life ==
Stephen Hagiochristophorites was of humble origin. The archbishop Eustathius of Thessalonica records that his father was a tax-collector. In the second half of the reign of Manuel I Komnenos (r. 1143–1180), Hagiochristophorites tried to attach himself to the imperial court, but was confronted by the ridicule and hostility of the aristocracy. Indeed, according to Eustathius, when he attempted to seduce an aristocratic lady and take her to wife to advance his own position, he was publicly flogged and had his nose cut off. Nevertheless, his determination was rewarded, and he was able to climb the administrative hierarchy, finally culminating in the office of administrator of the army, which he apparently received from Manuel I himself and held during the short reign of his son, Alexios II Komnenos (r. 1180–1183).

Andronikos I Komnenos seized power in 1182, nominally as co-emperor with Alexios II. Hagiochristophorites retained his post, and rapidly established himself as the new emperor's most trusted and powerful minister. In September or October 1183 Andronikos dispatched Hagiochristophorites, assisted by Constantine Tripsychos and Theodore Dadibrenos, to murder Alexios II. The young emperor was strangled with a bowstring, and Andronikos rewarded Hagiochristophorites with the rank of pansebastos sebastos and the post of logothetes tou dromou.

By September 1185, discontent in Constantinople was seething against Andronikos's regime: popular rumour said that a celebrated image of Saint Paul was shedding tears, and court soothsayer Skleros Seth foretold that the name of Andronikos's successor would start with an "I". Andronikos and his followers took this to mean the young aristocrat Isaac Angelos, and on 11 September, they struck: while the emperor retired to a palace on the Asian suburbs of the city, Hagiochristophorites and his attendants went to Isaac Angelos's house near the Peribleptos Monastery. Angelos at first panicked but then resolved to go down fighting, and, wielding a sword and riding his horse, charged his assailants. Faced with this unexpected attack, Hagiochristophorites turned to flee, but Angelos struck Hagiochristophorites a fatal blow on the head. After wounding the attendants and forcing them to flee, Angelos galloped down the Mese thoroughfare on horseback to the Hagia Sophia, shouting to the populace of his deed. Thus driven to an act of open sedition, and with the populace rallying behind him, on the next day Angelos was crowned emperor by the Patriarch Basil Kamateros, while Andronikos fled and was captured and executed a few days later.

== Reputation ==
The rise of this "most celebrated of the parvenues" (Charles Brand) to such power, his haughtiness and ruthlessness, and his complicity in the murder of Alexios II and in Andronikos's increasingly tyrannical rule, with its bloody purges of the aristocracy, combined to make Hagiochristophorites an object of hatred for the traditional elites, as attested in the writings of contemporaries and subsequent historians. Niketas Choniates describes Stephen's role in the proscriptions as the "ringleader and chief" of Andronikos's partisans, "whose thunderous voice crashed through the palace, sweeping away [...] all who were deemed suspect by Andronikos." Indeed, Choniates records that his surname, literally meaning "Holy Bearer of Christ"—although originally probably reflecting a place of origin dedicated to Saint Christopher—was popularly changed to Ἀντιχριστοφορίτης, Antichristophorites, literally meaning "bearer of the Antichrist", for, in the words of Choniates, "he was the most shameless of Andronikos's attendants, filled with every wickedness". Likewise, Niketas's brother, the Archbishop of Athens Michael Choniates called him "the iron nerve of tyranny", while a "dialogue of the dead" written after Andronikos's overthrow depicts him, head still cloven in two, trying to tax the dead in Hades in order to pay for his passage on Charon's boat.

== Sources ==
- Kazhdan, Alexander (1991). "Hagiochristophorites, Stephen". In Kazhdan, Alexander (ed.). The Oxford Dictionary of Byzantium. Oxford and New York: Oxford University Press. p. 895. ISBN 0-19-504652-8.
- Magoulias, Harry J., ed. (1984). O City of Byzantium: Annals of Niketas Choniates. Detroit: Wayne State University Press. ISBN 0-8143-1764-2.
- Savvides, Alexis G. K. (1994). "Notes on 12th-century Byzantine Prosopography (Aaron Isaacius-Stephanus Hagiochristophorites)". Vyzantiaka. 14. Thessaloniki: 341–353.
