= Siege of Trebizond (1205–1206) =

- Part of the Byzantine–Seljuk wars
Date	1205–1206
Location	Trebizond, Pontus
Result	Trapezuntine victory

Belligerents
Empire of Trebizond	Sultanate of Rûm

Commanders and leaders
Alexios I of Trebizond	Kaykhusraw I

The siege of Trebizond from 1205 to 1206 was an attempt by the Seljuk Sultanate of Rûm to take the city along the coast of the Black Sea. William Miller explains this action as punishment for "the disobedience of Alexios to his Kaykhusraw I commands."

Michel Kuršanskis explains that this unsuccessful siege was in response to the Trapezuntine ally, Queen Tamar of Georgia, who had attempted to capture Erzurum in 1205 but failed. When Sultan Kaykhusraw began his punitive campaign against Trebizond, he found his route limited to a few passes in the Pontic Alps, where the locals harassed his forces. Further, Alexios could respond to his attacks by "closing the sea" to all merchants, who could neither travel to the Crimea nor return from there. According to Ali ibn al-Athir, merchants from throughout the Middle East suffered a severe injury because of his siege of Trebizond. When they met at the great fair in Sivas, they delivered their complaints to the sultan in loud shouts.

Kuršanskis argues the failure of this siege led to the later successful capture of Sinope in 1214, which provided the Seljuk Turks with an outlet to the Black Sea.
