= Isaac Komnenos of Cyprus =

Isaac Komnenos
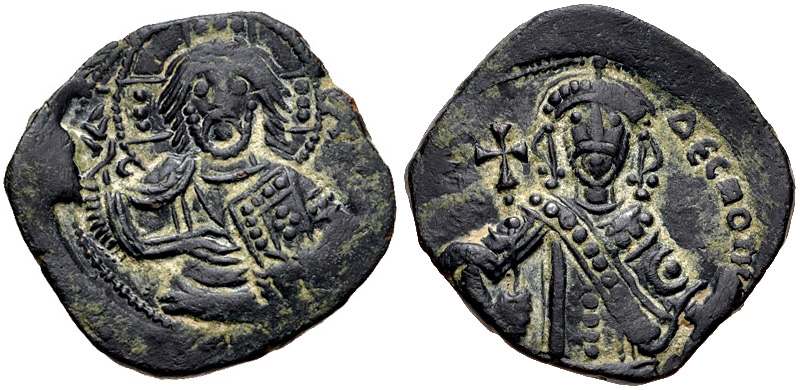
- Tetarteron coin minted in Isaac's name in Cyprus: left, bust of Christ Pantokrator; right, bust of Isaac in the regalia of a Byzantine emperor

Emperor in Cyprus
- Reign: 1185–1191
- Predecessor: Andronikos I Komnenos (as Byzantine Emperor)
- Successor: Guy of Lusignan (as King of Cyprus)
- Born: 1155
- Died: 1196 (age c. 41); Sultanate of Rum (now in Turkey)
- Issue: Damsel of Cyprus
- House: Komnenos
- Mother: Irene Komnene
- Religion: Roman Orthodox

Isaac Doukas Komnenos (or Ducas Comnenus, (Note: Greek: Ἰσαάκιος Δούκας Κομνηνός, romanized: Isaakios Doukas Komnēnos) c. 1155 – 1195/1196) was a claimant to the Byzantine Empire and the ruler of Cyprus from 1185 to 1191. Contemporary sources commonly refer to him as the emperor of Cyprus. He lost the island to King Richard I of England during the Third Crusade.

== Family ==
Isaac of Cyprus was a member of the royal Komnenos family. His grandfather Isaac had been bypassed by a younger brother, Manuel I Komnenos, in the succession to the Byzantine throne, instead taking the auxiliary position of sebastokrator. With his first wife Theodora Kamaterina (d. 1144) Isaac the sebastokrator had a daughter, Irene Komnene, who married one Doukas Kamateros and gave birth to Isaac of Cyprus, c. 1155.

== Life ==
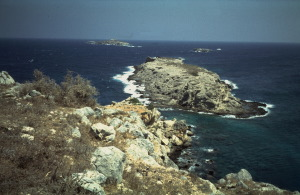
Cape Andreas, where Isaac is said to have been taken prisoner by the Crusaders

Isaac was the son of an otherwise obscure Byzantine aristocrat, Doukas Kamateros, and Irene Komnene, daughter of sebastokrator Isaac Komnenos. He married an Armenian princess on Cyprus.

=== Governor and prison ===
He was appointed governor of Isauria and the town of Tarsus by Emperor Manuel I Komnenos, and started a war against the Armenian Kingdom of Cilicia and was captured by its soldiers. Manuel I died in 1180 and his successors did not immediately attempt to rescue Isaac, whose long imprisonment seemingly contributed to his unpleasant disposition. On account of his Armenian royal wife, he perhaps endured not too harsh terms of captivity.

In 1183, the new Byzantine emperor Andronikos I Komnenos (1183–1185) contributed to Isaac's ransom. Constantine Makrodoukas, a loyal supporter of the Emperor and uncle of Isaac, and Andronikos Doukas, a relative and childhood friend, described as a "sodomite and debaucher", both made contributions and personally stood surety for the fealty of Isaac Komnenos to the Byzantine emperor. The Knights Templar, whom Niketas Choniates labels "the Phreri," contributed as well, as part of their international banking functions.

=== From prison to Cyprus ===
In 1185, the Armenians released Isaac, tired of the imperial service. He used leftover ransom money to hire a troop of mercenaries and sailed to Cyprus, where he made himself ruler with the help of falsified imperial letters ordering the local administration to obey him in everything. He took many Greeks into his service and created an independent patriarch of Cyprus, who crowned him as emperor in 1185.

Because Isaac Komnenos failed to return to imperial service, Andronikos I ordered Constantine Makrodoukas and Andronikos Doukas arrested for treason. A mob stoned them to death on 30 May 1185, incited by the courtier Stephen Hagiochristophorites. A water-oracle conducted by Hagiochristophorites had given the letter I (iota) as the initial of the succeeding emperor, leading Andronikos I to fear that Isaac would usurp the throne. A subsequent oracle ruled out this possibility, placing the start of the new reign on an imminent date that would leave Isaac no time to make the crossing from Cyprus.

Andronikos I was killed in a popular uprising in Constantinople on 12 September 1185. His successor, Isaac II Angelos, raised a fleet of 70 ships to take back Cyprus. Its commanders were John Kontostephanos and Alexios Komnenos, a nephew once removed of the Emperor. Neither man was ideally suited for this responsibility, John being of advanced age and Alexios having been blinded by order of Andronikos I.

The fleet landed in Cyprus, but after the troops had disembarked, the ships were captured by Margaritus of Brindisi, admiral of King William II of Sicily. Subsequently, Isaac or more likely Margaritus won a victory over the Byzantine troops and captured their commanders, who were carried off to Sicily. The rest of the sailors on Cyprus tried their best to survive and to fend off the enemy. "Only much later did they return home, if they had not perished altogether."

=== Rule of Cyprus ===
The Treasure of Nicosia does not contain any coins minted by Isaac; it is thought that the money was sent around 1190 to finance an uprising against him

From the time of his coronation, Isaac quickly started to plunder Cyprus, raping women, imposing overly cruel punishments for crimes, and stealing the possessions of the citizens. "Cypriots of high esteem, comparable to Job in riches now were seen begging in the streets, naked and hungry, if they were not put to the sword by this irascible tyrant." Furthermore, he ordered the foot of Basil Pentakenos, his old teacher, hacked and amputated.

Niketas Choniates, clearly not very partial to Isaac, describes him as an irascible and violent man, "boiling with anger like a kettle on the fire." Byzantine emperor Andronikos I Komnenos nevertheless bore responsibility for greater cruelties. A seeming league with William II of Sicily, a powerful thorn in the side of the Byzantine Empire, helped Isaac hold the island for the duration of his reign, and he was also closely connected to Saladin.

=== Third Crusade ===
Richard the Lionheart and others embarked on the Third Crusade in 1189. Early in 1191, Berengaria of Navarre, the fiancée of Richard, and Joan of England, the sister of Richard, travelled together and were shipwrecked on Cyprus; Isaac Komnenos then took them captive. In retaliation, Richard conquered the island while on his way to Tyre. Isaac is recorded shooting two arrows at Richard from horseback, which is notable because Byzantine horse archery is an obscure subject.

The City Flag of Portsmouth, still bearing what had been Isaac Komnenos' arms

The English took Isaac prisoner near Cape Apostolos Andreas on the Karpas Peninsula, the northernmost tip of the island. According to tradition, as Richard had promised not to put him into "irons," he kept Isaac prisoner in shackles wrought of silver. The English transferred Isaac to the Knights Hospitaller, who kept him imprisoned in Margat near Tripoli.

This was a major turning point in the history of Cyprus, leading to the foundation of the Kingdom of Cyprus which would rule the island for several centuries.

On his return to England, King Richard granted the town of Portsmouth the coat of arms of Isaac Komnenos: "a crescent of gold on a shade of azure, with a blazing star of eight points" – in recognition of the significant involvement of soldiers, sailors, and vessels from Portsmouth in the conquest of Cyprus.

=== Imprisonment, ransom, and death ===
Returning to Europe after the Third Crusade, Richard was captured by Leopold V, Duke of Austria and Styria, and imprisoned by Henry VI, Holy Roman Emperor, accused of murdering his cousin Conrad of Montferrat. The subsequent ransom agreement freed Isaac and his daughter into the care of Leopold V, the son of Isaac's aunt Theodora Komnene.

Isaac then traveled to the Sultanate of Rum, where he attempted to gain support against the new Byzantine emperor Alexios III Angelos, crowned in 1195. However his ambitions came to nothing, as he died of poisoning in 1195 or 1196.

== Bibliography ==
- Boyle, David, The Troubador's Song: The Capture and Ransom of Richard I, Walker Publishing Company, 2005
- Brudndage, J. A., ‘Richard the Lion-Heart and Byzantium’, Studies in Medieval Culture 6-7 (1970), 63-70 and reprinted in J.A. Brundage, The Crusades, Holy War and Canon Law, Variorum, 1991, No. IV
- Coureas, Nicolas, 'To what extent was the crusaders’ capture of Cyprus impelled by strategic considerations', Epetêris 19 (1992), 197-202
- Edbury, P. W., The Kingdom of Cyprus and the Crusades, 1191-1374, Cambridge University Press, 1991
- Harris, Jonathan, Byzantium and the Crusades, Bloomsbury, 2nd ed., 2014. ISBN 978-1-78093-767-0
- Harris, Jonathan, 'Collusion with the infidel as a pretext for military action against Byzantium', in Clash of Cultures: the Languages of Love and Hate, ed. S. Lambert and H. Nicholson, Brepols, 2012, pp. 99–117
- The Oxford Dictionary of Byzantium, Oxford University Press, 1991
- Rudt de Collenberg, W. H., 'L'empereur Isaac de Chypre et sa fille (1155–1207)', Byzantion 38 (1968), 123–77
- Quail, Sarah (1994). The Origins of Portsmouth and the First Charter. City of Portsmouth. ISBN 0-901559-92-X.
