= Eustathius of Thessalonica =

12th-century Byzantine scholar and bishop

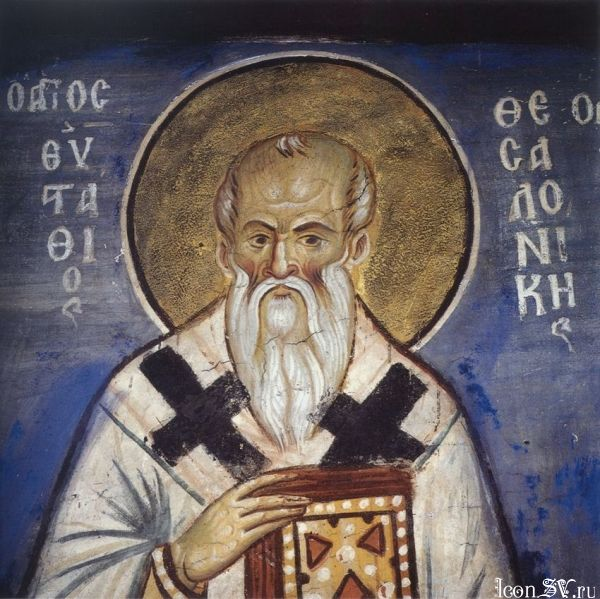
- Icon of Eustathios of Thessalonika, (Vatopedi Monastery, 1312)
- Born: c. 1115
- Died: c. 1195/6
- Other names: Eustathios of Thessalonike, Greek: Εὐστάθιος Θεσσαλονίκης
- Occupations: Scholar and Archbishop of Thessalonica
- Notable work: Sack of Thessalonica

Eustathius of Thessalonica (or Eustathios of Thessalonike; Greek: Εὐστάθιος Θεσσαλονίκης; c. 1115 – c. 1195/6) was a Byzantine Greek scholar and Archbishop of Thessalonica and is a saint in the Eastern Orthodox Church. He is most noted for his stand against the sack of Thessalonica by the Normans in 1185, contemporary account of the event, for his orations and for his commentaries on Homer, which incorporate many remarks by much earlier researchers.

He was officially canonized on June 10, 1988, and his feast day is on September 20.

== Life ==
A pupil of Nicholas Kataphloron, Eustathius was appointed to the offices of superintendent of petitions (ἐπὶ τῶν δεήσεων, epi ton deeseon), professor of rhetoric (μαΐστωρ ῥητόρων), and was ordained a deacon in Constantinople.

He was ordained bishop of Myra. Around the year 1178, he was appointed to the archbishopric of Thessalonica, where he remained until his death around 1195/1196.

Accounts of his life and work are given in the funeral orations by Euthymius and Michael Choniates (of which manuscripts survive in the Bodleian Library in the University of Oxford). Niketas Choniates (viii.238, x.334) praised him as the most learned man of his age, a judgment which is difficult to dispute. He wrote commentaries on ancient Greek poets, theological treatises, addresses, letters, and an important account of the sack of Thessalonica by William II of Sicily in 1185.

Of his works, his commentaries on Homer are the most widely referred to: they display an extensive knowledge of Greek literature from the earliest to the latest times. Other works exhibit impressive character, and oratorical power, which earned him the esteem of the Komnenoi emperors. Politically, Eustathios was a supporter of emperor Manuel I. An original thinker, Eustathios sometimes praised such secular values as military prowess. He decried slavery, and praised Manuel I Komnenos for abolishing slavery in 1167.

== Works ==
His most important works are the following:

- On the Capture of Thessalonica, an eye-witness account of the siege of 1185 and subsequent sufferings of the people of Thessalonica. In early sections of this memoir Eustathios describes also political events at Constantinople from the death of emperor Manuel I through the short reign of Alexios II to the usurpation of Andronikos I, with sharp comments on the activities of all involved. The Greek text was edited by Kyriakidis, with an Italian translation by V. Rotolo; there is an English translation (with a commentary and associated essays) by J. Melville-Jones (Byzantina Australiensia Volume 8), a French translation by Paolo Odorico, and a German translation by H. Hunger.
- A number of orations, some of which have been edited by P. Wirth (Eustathii Thessalonicensis Opera Minora). In 2013 a translation of six of the earliest of these speeches was published with a commentary by Andrew F. Stone (Byzantina Australiensia Volume 19).
- Commentaries on Homer's Iliad and Odyssey (Παρεκβολαὶ εἰς τὴν Ὁμήρου Ἰλιάδα καὶ Ὀδύσσειαν). These address questions of grammar, etymology, mythology, history and geography. They are not so much original commentaries as extracts from earlier commentators – there are many correspondences with Homeric scholia. Drawing on numerous extensive works of Alexandrian grammarians and critics and later commentators, they are a very important contribution to Homeric scholarship, not least because some of the works from which Eustathios made extracts are lost.

Although it is likely that Eustathios quotes some authors second-hand, he seems personally acquainted with the works of the greatest ancient critics – Aristarchos of Samothrace, Zenodotos, Aristophanes of Byzantium, and others. This is a great tribute to the state of the libraries of Constantinople and of classical scholarship there in the 12th century. He was also an avid reader of the Deipnosophistae of Athenaeus. Some of the etymological and grammatical comments by Eustathios's Alexandrian predecessors are full of errors; and Eustathios's own comments are diffuse and frequently interrupted by digressions.

The first printed edition, by Majoranus, was published in Rome in 1542–1550 (4 vols., fol.), an inaccurate reprint being later published in Basel in 1559–1560. A. Politi's edition (Florence, 1730, 3 vols., folio), contains only the commentary on the first five books of the Iliad with a Latin translation. A tolerably correct reprint of the Roman edition was published at Leipzig, the first part containing the Odyssey commentary (2 vols., 4to.), 1825–1826, and the second, containing the Iliad commentary (3 vols., 4to.), edited by J. G. Stallbaum for the Patrologia Graeca, 1827–1829. These were superseded by the edition of M. van der Valk, 1971 onwards. Extracts from the commentaries are quoted in many editions of the Homeric poems.

- A commentary on Dionysius Periegetes (dedicated to John Doukas, son of Andronikos Kamateros). This is as diffuse as the commentary on Homer, but includes numerous valuable extracts from earlier writers. (It was first printed in R. Stephens' edition of Dionysius (Paris, 1547, 4to.), and later in that of H. Stephens (Paris, 1577, 4to., and 1697, 8vo.), in Hudson's Geograph. Minor, vol. iv., and lastly, in Gottfried Bernhardy's edition of Dionysius (Leipzig, 1828, 8vo.).
- A commentary on Pindar. No manuscript of this has come to light; but the introduction survives. (The introduction was first published by Gottlieb Tafel in his Eustathii Thessalonicensis Opuscula (Frankfurt, 1832, 4to.), from which it was reprinted separately by Schneidewin, Eustathii prooemium commentariorum Pindaricorum (Göttingen, 1837, 8vo.).
- Other published works. Some were first published by Tafel in the 1832 Opuscula just mentioned, some appeared later, as by P. Wirth for the Corpus Fontium Historiae Byzantinae series.
- Unpublished works: these include theological writings and commemorative speeches. Several of the latter are important historical sources.

== Editions and translations ==
- van der Valk, Marchinus, ed. (1971–1987). Eustathius: Commentarii ad Homeri Iliadem pertinentes ad fidem codicis Laurentiani editi. Leiden: Brill.
- Olson, Douglas; Cullhed, Eric, eds. (2022). Eustathius of Thessalonica, commentary on the Odyssey. Volume I: Preface and commentary on Rhapsodies 1-4. Leiden Boston: Brill. ISBN 9789004527355.
- Olson, Douglas; Cullhed, Eric, eds. (2023). Eustathius of Thessalonica, commentary on the Odyssey. Volume II: Commentary on rhapsodies 5-8. Leiden; Boston: Brill. ISBN 9789004548701.
- Eustathios of Thessaloniki, The Capture of Thessaloniki, tr. J. R. Melville-Jones (Canberra 1988).

== Bibliography ==
- Angold, Michael (1995). Church and society in Byzantium under the Comneni, 1081–1261. Cambridge University Press. pp. 179–196. ISBN 0-521-26432-4.
- Eustathius. Eustathii archiepiscopi Thessalonicensis commentarii ad Homeri Iliadem pertinentes, vols. 1-4 (ed. Marchinus van der Valk). Leyden: Brill, 1:1971; 2:1976; 3:1979; 4:1987.
- Kazhdan, Alexander, ed. (1991). Oxford Dictionary of Byzantium. Oxford University Press. p. 754. ISBN 978-0-19-504652-6.
- Magdalino, Paul (2002), The Empire of Manuel I Komnenos, 1143–1180, Cambridge University Press, ISBN 0-521-52653-1
- Smith, William (editor); Dictionary of Greek and Roman Biography and Mythology, "Eustathius (7)", Boston, (1867)
- Schaff, Philip, Eustathius of Thessalonica, from History of the Christian Church, 1882.
- Stone, A.F., "Aurality in the Panegyrics of Eustathios of Thessaloniki in Theatron", Rhetorical Culture in Late Antiquity and the Middle Ages, Walter de Gruyter, Berlin, pp. 417–28.
