= Alexios I of Trebizond =

Emperor of Trebizond and Byzantine claimant (1204–1222)

Emperor of Trebizond Claimant Byzantine Emperor
- Reign: 1204 – 1 February 1222
- Successor: Andronikos I
- Co-ruler: David I (1204–1212)
- Born: c. 1182
- Died: 1 February 1222 (aged 39–40)
- Spouse: possibly Theodora Axouchina
- Issue more...: John I; Manuel I
- Dynasty: Komnenos
- Father: Manuel Komnenos
- Mother: Rusudan
- Religion: Greek Orthodox Christian

Alexios I Megas Komnenos (Greek: Αλέξιος Κομνηνός; (Note: The style Megas Komnenos ("grand Komnenos"), commonly applied to all the Trapezuntine Komnenos emperors by modern historians, began as a nickname and was not formally used in an official capacity until the reign of Alexios I's grandson George.) Georgian: ალექსი კომნენოსი; c. 1182 – 1 February 1222) or Alexius I Megas Comnenus with his brother David, the founder of the Empire of Trebizond and its ruler from 1204 until his death in 1222. The two brothers were the only male descendants of the Byzantine Emperor Andronikos I, who had been dethroned and killed in 1185, and thus claimed to represent the legitimate government of the Empire following the conquest of Constantinople by the Fourth Crusade in 1204. Although his rivals governing the Nicaean Empire succeeded in becoming the de facto successors, and rendered his dynastic claims to the imperial throne moot, Alexios' descendants continued to emphasize both their heritage and connection to the Komnenian dynasty by later referring to themselves as Megas Komnenos ("grand Komnenos").

While his brother David conquered a number of Byzantine provinces in northwestern Anatolia, Alexios defended his capital Trebizond from an unsuccessful siege by the Seljuk Turks around the year 1205. Further details of his reign are sparse. Muslim chroniclers record how, in 1214, Alexios was captured by the Turks in the field while defending Sinope; despite sending an envoy to seek their surrender the city refused to capitulate to Sultan Kaykaus I, and Alexios was tortured in sight of the Sinopians. The city submitted to Kaykaus and Alexios was freed after becoming Kaykaus' vassal. Alexios died at the age of forty.

== From Constantinople to Georgia ==
Alexios was the eldest son of Manuel Komnenos, and a grandson of the Byzantine Emperor Andronikos I (reigned 1183–1185). Andronikos had taken refuge at the court of King George III of Georgia in the 1170s, and was a governor in the Pontus when his cousin the emperor Manuel I Komnenos (r. 1143–1180) died; upon hearing the news, he marched on Constantinople and seized the imperial throne. His reign was a turbulent one, and in 1185 Andronikos was dethroned and killed while his son Manuel was blinded and may have died from this mutilation.

Manuel left two children, Alexios and David. Their mother's name is not recorded in the primary sources; Byzantinist Alexander Vasiliev speculates that it is "possible" that their mother was a Georgian princess. Somehow the boys arrived at the court of their relative Queen Tamar of Georgia; scholars have speculated when and how they made their way there. One school of thought endorses the hypothesis of Fallmerayer, who believed the boys were taken from Constantinople during the chaos of their grandfather's fall from power in 1185, when Alexios was about three years old, and came to Georgia early in Tamar's reign. Another school of thought follows George Finlay's belief that the boys remained in Constantinople, and although educated in the capital, were somehow safe from Andronikos' successor, emperor Isaac II Angelos (r. 1185–1195 and 1203–1204); Finlay argued that they were not at risk from "a government which, like that of the Byzantine empire, was recognized to be elective, and in which their father had been excluded from the throne by the exercise of an acknowledged constitutional prerogative." Older writers who had no knowledge of the chronicle of the Trapezuntine chronicler Michael Panaretos nor access to Georgian records, such as Edward Gibbon, assumed the brothers were simply made governors of Trebizond, and when the Fourth Crusade conquered Constantinople, Alexios declared himself emperor there. Vasiliev discussed these opinions in a 1936 article published in Speculum and considered Fallmerayer's hypothesis as closer to the truth.

Exactly how Alexios and Queen Tamar of Georgia were related is not clear. According to Michael Panaretos, Queen Tamar was Alexios' "paternal relative" (προς πατρός θεὶα), a phrase that has baffled scholars. As early as 1854 the Russian scholar Kunik proposed that this phrase meant that Alexios' mother was Rusudan a little-known sister of Tamar, a theory Vasiliev endorsed. Cyril Toumanoff argued that their grandfather Andronikos, while in Georgia, had married an unnamed sister of king George III. More recently Michel Kuršanskis has argued against Toumanoff's theory, producing evidence that Alexios' mother and/or grandmother were daughters of the houses of Palaiologos or Doukas, yet failing to offer an explanation why Panaretos describes Tamar as Alexios' paternal aunt.

Despite the research of Vasiliev, Toumanoff, Kuršanskis and others, Alexios' life is a blank between 1185, when Andronikos was deposed and murdered, and 1204 when he and David arrived at Trebizond—although this lack of information has not prevented scholars from proposing various hypotheses. All authorities agree that Alexios and his brother found refuge at Tamar's court. Vasiliev even speculates that "Georgian became their native tongue" and that they "were thoroughly Georgian in language and education as well as in political ideals", but possibly "some Greeks were among their attendants in order that they might be familiar with the language of their own country". However, Kuršanskis notes that there are few traces of Georgian influence in the administration and culture of the Empire of Trebizond, and points out that its elite always looked towards Constantinople for their political and religious models.

== Return from Georgia ==
After marching from Georgia, and with the help of their paternal relative Queen Tamar, Alexios and David occupied Trebizond in April 1204. That same month Alexios was proclaimed emperor at the age of 22, an act considered by later writers as the moment the Empire of Trebizond was founded.

Vasiliev was one of the first historians to suspect that Tamar assisted her young relatives for reasons beyond familial loyalty. "Religiously minded, Tamar had the habit of bestowing alms on monasteries and churches not only in her own country but also all over the Near East", Vasiliev wrote in 1936. One such gift she bestowed on a group of monks before they left for Jerusalem was taken from them by the Byzantine emperor Alexios III Angelos (r. 1195–1203) as they sailed past Constantinople; although Tamar subsequently made up for the theft by giving the monks a much more lavish gift, Alexios' theft insulted the queen. She decided to avenge the insult by supporting her nephews in their invasion of Byzantine territories.

The date Alexios entered Trebizond may be narrowed down even further. Sergey Karpov has identified a lead seal of Alexios, on one side "the image of a strategos in the peaked helmet leaded by hand by St. George" with the inscriptions Ἀλέξιος ὁ Κομνηνός [Alexios Komnenos] and Ὁ Ἅ(γιος) Γεώργιος [Saint George] on either side; on the obverse is a scene of Ἡ Ἁγία Ἀνάστασις [The Holy Resurrection] with the corresponding inscription. Karpov interprets the significance of this image and the inscription as portraying the most important achievement of his life, St. George inviting the victorious prince to enter Trebizond and opening the gates of the city with his left hand. The importance of St. George was that Easter—the date of the Resurrection—in 1204 fell on 25 April, while the memorial date of St. George was 23 April. "So I dared to assume," writes Karpov, "that the seal points out the date of the capture of Trebizond."

Vasiliev points out that the brothers occupied Trebizond too early to have done so in response to the Crusaders capturing Constantinople; Alexios and David began their march on Trebizond before news of the sack of Constantinople on 13 April 1204 could reach either Trebizond or Georgia. According to Vasiliev, however, their original intention was not to seize a base from which they could recover the capital of the Byzantine Empire, but rather to carve out of the Byzantine Empire a buffer state to protect Georgia from the Seljuk Turks. Kuršanskis, while agreeing with Vasiliev that Tamar was motivated by revenge for Alexios Angelos's insult, proposed a more obvious motivation for the brothers' return to Byzantine territory: they had decided to raise the banner of revolt, depose Alexios Angelos, and return the imperial throne to the Komnenos dynasty. However, not long after they had gained control of Trebizond and the neighboring territories, news of the Latin conquest of Constantinople reached them, and the brothers entered the competition for recovery of the imperial city against Theodore I Laskaris in western Anatolia (ruler of the "Empire of Nicaea") and Michael Komnenos Doukas in mainland Greece (ruler of the "Despotate of Epirus").

Over the following months, David marched westward making himself master of the rest of the Pontus and of Paphlagonia. Anthony Bryer suggests the account in the Georgian Royal Annals of the invasion could be separated into the two routes the individual brothers took. Both started in Imereti and reached Trebizond; David proceeded along the coast, perhaps leading a fleet, capturing Kerasous, Cide, Amasra and Heraclea Pontica; meanwhile Alexios took possession of Limnia, Samsun and Sinope. Although a minor port, Samsun was the Seljuk Sultanate of Rum's doorway to the Black Sea, and Alexios' occupation blocked the Sultanate from the trade and the opportunities of expansion Samsun represented; in the words of the Muslim historian Ali ibn al-Athir, he "closed the sea" to the Seljuks. Gaining Paphlagonia gave the brothers access to an important base of support. The Komnenos family was popular in Paphlagonia, with which they had long-established ties, as it was their home province: Kastamone was said to be the ancestral castle of the Komnenoi; during the reign of Isaac II Angelos a pretender to the throne had appeared in Paphlagonia, calling himself Alexios, and he succeeded in uniting several districts behind him.

While David was in Paphlagonia, Alexios was forced to remain in the neighborhood of Trebizond, defending the eastern part of their domain from the attacks of the Seljuk Turks. These attacks culminated in the first siege of Trebizond by Sultan Kaykhusraw I. In a panegyric to his master, the Nicaean emperor Theodore Laskaris, Nicetas Choniates compared Alexios to Hylas, a member of the expedition of the Argonauts who landed on the coast of Mysia to obtain water, but was kidnapped by the Naiads and never seen again.

Although Theodore Laskaris pushed back the Komnenos brothers' western frontier by defeating an attempt to seize Nicomedia, by 1207 the grandsons of Andronikos Komnenos ruled over the largest of the three Byzantine successor states. From Heraclea Pontica their domain extended east to Trebizond and past it to Soterioupolis on the Georgian frontier. Alexios also made parts of the Crimea a tributary to Trebizond. Cherson, Kerch, and their hinterlands were governed as an overseas province called Perateia ("beyond the sea"). It appeared that it was only a matter of time before one of the Komnenos brothers seized Constantinople to rule as "Basileus and Autokrator of the Rhomaioi". Unfortunately, this proved to be the high-water mark of their conquests.

== Campaigns in Paphlagonia ==
Their adversary, Theodore Laskaris, had not been idle. He had neutralized rivals along his southern marches—Sabas Asidenos, Manuel Maurozomes, and Theodore Mangaphas; he had been crowned Emperor in March or April 1206; all the while Theodore had frustrated attempts of Henry of Flanders to expand the newly founded Latin Empire into Anatolia. In 1208 Theodore decided to strike against the Paphlagonian possessions of Alexios' brother David by crossing the Sangarios River and investing Heraclea Pontica. In response, David sent a deputation to Henry of Flanders, which reached the Latin Emperor in September 1208 with their request for help. Henry led his troops across the Sea of Marmara and occupied Nicomedia, threatening Laskaris' rear, and forcing the latter to lift his siege and return to his own territory. Theodore's withdraw was costly, for he lost about 1000 men in crossing the Sangarios, which was in flood.

Despite this setback, Theodore did not abandon his attempts on Paphlagonia. Following the Seljuk defeat at Antioch on the Meander, he concluded a treaty with the new Seljuk Sultan, Kaykaus I, and together they encroached on the Trapezuntine territory. According to the panegyric of Niketas Choniates, there was no resistance to Theodore's incursions, and Theodore eventually captured Heraclea Pontica and Amastris.

It was during this period that David Komnenos vanishes from the scene. We know of his ultimate fate from a note in a manuscript written at Mount Athos that tells us David died as a monk of Vatopedi monastery on 13 December 1212. How he went from trusted ally of Alexios to a monastic life—likely an enforced change—has not been documented. Shukurov believes this silence was intentional and therefore significant, that David somehow disgraced himself and was confined to Vatopedi by Alexios. A clue to his offence may be that at one point, faced with another attack from Theodore Laskaris with insufficient men to draw on, David had become a vassal of the enemy of the Byzantine successor realms, the Latin Empire, since, as William Miller explains, "It was his interest to prefer a nominal Latin suzerainty to annexation by the Nicene Emperor".

Kuršanskis suggests that Alexios also intrigued in the internal politics of the Seljuk Sultanate, supporting Kaykaus' brother Kayqubad against him. This is his interpretation of a puzzling passage in the account of Ibn Bibi, where he states that Sultan Kaykawus was at Sivas when messengers arrived with the report that Alexis had crossed the border and seized territory belonging to the Sultan—when there was no point to this action. If Kuršanskis' has correctly interpreted what lies behind this passage, this would provide Kaykaus with an even stronger reason to ally with Theodore.

Kaykaus' role in this alliance was to capture Sinope, the most important port on the Black Sea, and controlling it would once again open the sea to the Seljuks. It was while besieging the port city that Alexios was captured in a skirmish; according to Ibn Bibi, he was hunting outside the city with an escort of 500 cavalry, which Kuršanskis dryly observes was overkill for a simple hunt. This fortunate incident provided Kaykaus with the leverage he needed to take the city, which lies on an isthmus and protected by formidable walls. Alexios was shown to the defenders of the city. At the Sultan's command, Ibn Bibi writes, he sent a confidante into the city to negotiate a surrender; the inhabitants told Alexios' man, "Suppose Alexius has been captured. None the less he has grown sons in Trebizond who are capable of governing. We will elect one of them as our ruler and will not surrender the country to the Turks." Shukurov suggests that the Sinopians' lack of concern for Alexios was out of spite for the deposition of his brother.

Infuriated by their response, Sultan Kaykaus had the unfortunate Alexios tortured in sight of the city walls several times, until the defenders changed their minds. Negotiations began, and on 1 November 1214 the inhabitants surrendered their city to the Seljuks on terms. Alexios was freed, and after pledging his loyalty to the Sultan, and promising to pay tribute, he was allowed to return to Trebizond.

== Later years ==
The loss of Sinope pushed the western frontier of Komnenine territories, which had been at Heraclea a few years earlier, back to the Iris and Thermodon rivers, only 250 kilometres (160 mi) from their base at Trebizond. This loss isolated Trebizond from direct contact with the Empire of Nicaea and the other Greek lands. Cut off from the rest of the Byzantine world, the Trapezuntine rulers for the next two generations turned their immediate attention to Asian affairs.

Nothing certain is known of the remainder of Alexios' life. Vasiliev has suggested that when George IV Lasha of Georgia was campaigning near the Kura River, Alexios was amongst the "tributaries [who] arrived from Khlar and Greece with presents", in the phrasing of the Georgian chronicles. He identifies "Khlar" with Ahlat near Lake Van, and states that by "Greece" the chronicler meant the Trapezuntine Empire. Kuršanskis, however, is not convinced by Vasiliev's arguments, pointing out that Alexios would have travelled too far from Trebizond to pay homage and emphasizes that Trebizond was always referred to in the Georgian Chronicle as "Pontus" and never as "Greece".

Alexios died on 1 February 1222 after a reign of eighteen years. His eldest son John was passed over in favor of his son-in-law, Andronikos I Gidos.

== Family and succession ==
Alexios married at some point in his life, but contemporary writers fail to record any information about his wife. Theodora Axuchina is supposed by some to have been her name, which appears in the Europäische Stammtafeln: Stammtafeln zur Geschichte der Europäischen Staaten (1978) by Detlev Schwennicke. It has since found its place in several modern genealogies.

Michel Kuršankis has argued, on the strength of John I Axouchos's surname and Alexios I's known political affiliations, that he had married, probably about 1201, a daughter of John Komnenos "the Fat" (d.1200), son of the protostrator Alexios Axouch. Alexios is known to have had two sons, the future emperors John I and Manuel I, and a daughter who married Andronikos Gidos. The Russian Byzantinist Rustam Shukurov has argued that Alexios had at least one more son, and speculated that one may have been the Ioannikios who was tonsured and confined to a monastery when Manuel became emperor.

== Notes ==
Alexios I of Trebizond Komnenid dynasty Born: c. 1182 Died: 1 February 1222
Regnal titles
New title	Emperor of Trebizond; 1204–1222	Succeeded by Andronikos I
