= Alexios II Komnenos =

Byzantine emperor from 1180 to 1183

- Emperor and Autocrat of the Romans
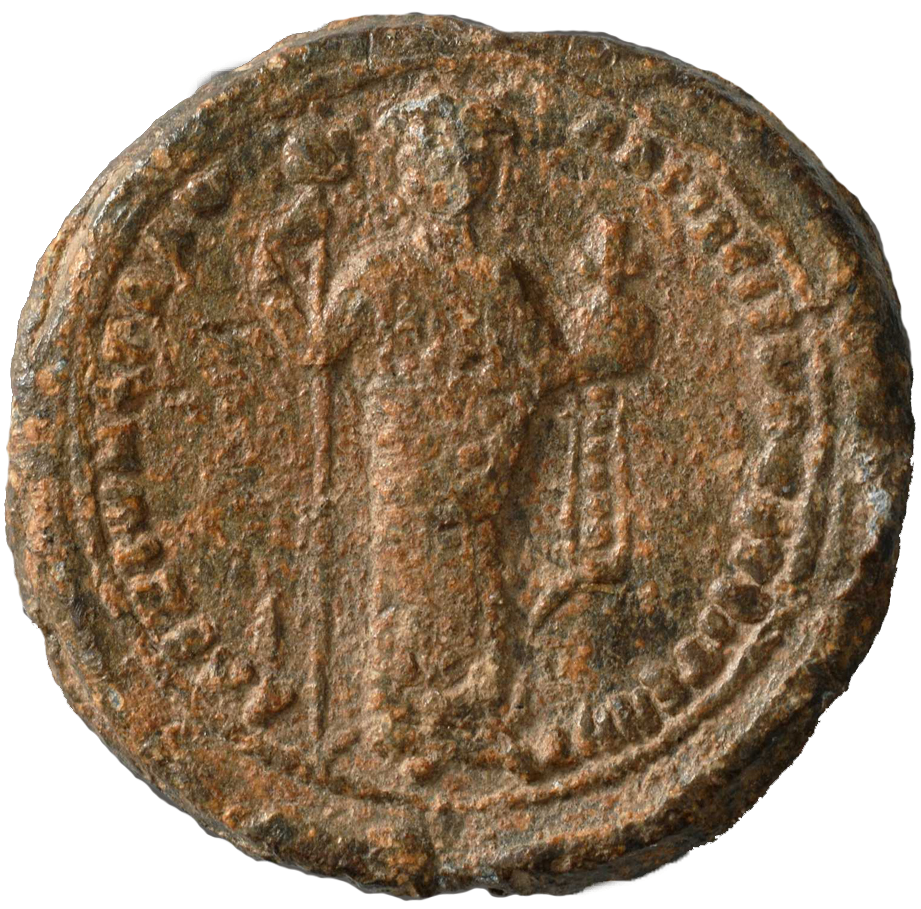
- Seal of Alexios Komnenos.

Byzantine emperor
- Reign: 24 September 1180 – September 1183
- Coronation: 1171 as co-emperor
- Predecessor: Manuel I Komnenos
- Successor: Andronikos I Komnenos
- Born: 14 September 1169; Constantinople (now Istanbul, Turkey)
- Died: September 1183 (aged 14); Constantinople
- Spouse: Anna of France (m. 1180)
- Dynasty: Komnenos
- Father: Manuel I Komnenos
- Mother: Maria of Antioch

Alexios II Komnenos (Greek: Ἀλέξιος Κομνηνός, romanized: Aléxios Komnēnós; 14 September 1169 (Note: Alternative dates of birth are 10 September 1169, or a more vague 1168, based on William of Tyre's statement that Alexios was 13 in 1180) – September 1183), Latinized Alexius II Comnenus, was Byzantine emperor from 1180 to 1183. He ascended to the throne as a minor. For the duration of his short reign, the imperial power was de facto held by regents.

== Biography ==
=== Early years ===
Born in the purple at Constantinople, Alexios was the long-awaited son of Emperor Manuel I Komnenos (who gave him a name that began with the letter alpha as a fulfillment of the AIMA prophecy) and Maria of Antioch. In 1171 he was crowned co-emperor, and in 1175 he accompanied his father at Dorylaion in Asia Minor in order to have the city rebuilt. On 2 March 1180, at the age of ten, he was married to Agnes of France aged eight, daughter of King Louis VII of France. She was thereafter known as Anna, and after Alexios' murder three years later, Anna would be remarried to the person responsible, Andronikos, then aged 65.

=== Regency of Maria and Alexios ===
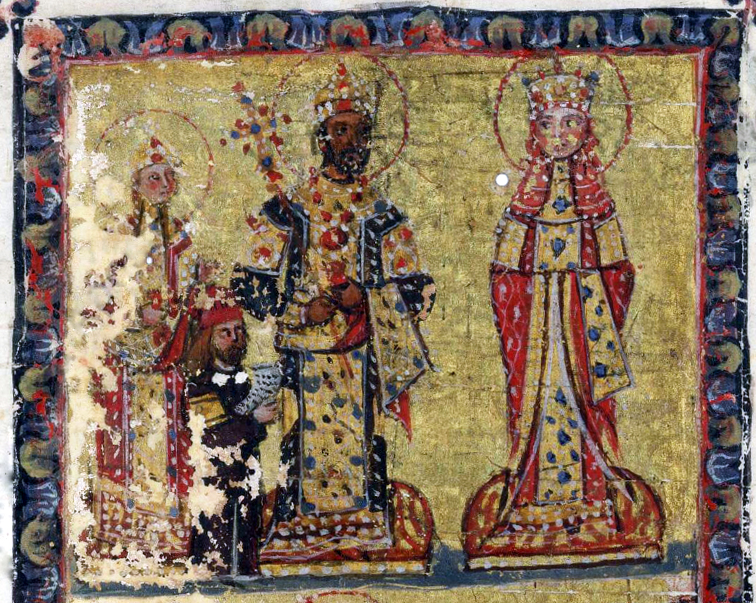
Alexios II with his father Manuel I Komnenos and mother Maria of Antioch, depicted in an illuminated manuscript, ca. 1179. (Note: The identification of these three figures from Vat. Gr. 1851 as Alexios II and his parents is by Ioannis Spatharakis. Other historians variously identify them as a young Andronikos IV Palaiologos or Andronikos II Palaiologos with their respective parents.)

When Manuel I died in September 1180, Alexios II succeeded him as emperor. At this time, however, he was an uneducated boy with only amusement in mind. The imperial regency was then undertaken by the dowager empress and the prōtosebastos Alexios Komnenos (a namesake cousin of Alexios II), who was popularly believed to be her lover.

The regents depleted the imperial treasury by granting privileges to Italian merchants and to the Byzantine aristocracy. When Béla III of Hungary and Kilij Arslan II of Rum began raiding within the Byzantine western and eastern borders respectively, the regents were forced to ask for help to the pope and to Saladin. Furthermore, a party supporting Alexios II's right to reign, led by his half-sister Maria Komnene and her husband the caesar John, stirred up riots in the streets of the capital.

The regents managed to defeat the party on April 1182, but Andronikos Komnenos, a first cousin of Manuel I, took advantage of the disorder to aim at the crown. He entered Constantinople, received with almost divine honours, and overthrew the government. His arrival was celebrated by a massacre of the Latins in Constantinople, especially the Venetian merchants, which he made no attempt to stop.

=== Regency of Andronikos and death ===
On 16 May 1182 Andronikos, posing as Alexios' protector, officially restored him on the throne. As before, the young emperor was uninterested in ruling matters, and Andronikos effectively acted as the power behind the throne, not allowing Alexios any voice in public affairs. One after another, Andronikos suppressed most of Alexios' defenders and supporters: his half-sister Maria Komnene, the caesar John, his loyal generals Andronikos Doukas Angelos, Andronikos Kontostephanos and John Komnenos Vatatzes, while Empress Dowager Maria was put in prison.

In 1183, Alexios was compelled to condemn his own mother to death. In September 1183, Andronikos was formally proclaimed emperor before the crowd on the terrace of the Church of Christ of the Chalkè. Probably by the end of the same month, Andronikos ordered Alexios' assassination; the young emperor was secretly strangled with a bow-string and his body thrown in the Bósporos.

In the years following Alexios' mysterious disappearance, many young men resembling him tried to claim the throne. In the end, none of those pseudo-Alexioi managed to become emperor.

== Portrayal in fiction ==
Alexios is a character in the historical novel Agnes of France (1980) by Greek writer Kostas Kyriazis. The novel describes the events of the reigns of Manuel I, Alexios II, and Andronikos I through the eyes of Agnes.

== Notes ==
Alexios II Komnenos Komnenian dynasty Born: 14 September 1169 Died: September 1183
Regnal titles
| Preceded by Manuel I Komnenos | Byzantine emperor 1180–1183 | Succeeded by Andronikos I Komnenos |
