= Kata (name) =

Kata is both a surname and a given name.

In Croatia, the name Kata was among the most common feminine given names until 1949. It is a shorter form of Katarina.

In Hungary, it is often a shorter form of Katalin. While it remains rooted as a "vernacular short form" of Katalin, Kata is registered independently without requiring the full name Katalin, differentiating it from earlier times when only formal names were accepted.

In Georgia, it is a short form of Katay.

Notable people with the name include:

== Surname ==
- Elizabeth Kata (1912–1998), Australian writer who used Kata as part of a pseudonym
- Kpama Baramoto Kata (born 1947), Congolese general
- Matt Kata (born 1978), American baseball player
- Mihály Kata (born 2002), Hungarian footballer
- Niko Kata (born 1993), Spanish footballer of Congolese and Equatorial Guinean descent
- Peter Kata (born 2007), Hungarian-American professional Fortnite Battle Royale player, better known as 'Peterbot'
- Solomone Kata (born 1994), Tonga and New Zealand rugby footballer

== Given name ==
- Kata (daughter of George I of Georgia) (fl. 1000s), a princess of the Bagrationi dynasty
- Kata (daughter of David IV of Georgia) (fl. 1100s), a princess of the Bagrationi dynasty
- Kata Bethlen (1700–1759), Hungarian memoir writer
- Kata Burián (born 1995), Hungarian swimmer (birth name Katalin)
- Kata Csizér (born 1971), Hungarian linguist
- Kata Csondor (born 1978), Hungarian voice actress, singer and songwriter
- Kata Dalström (1858–1923), Swedish socialist agitator and leftist writer (birth name Katarina)
- Kata Dobó (born 1974), Hungarian actress (birth name Katalin)
- Kata Inocencio (born 1960), Filipino broadcast journalist and child rights advocate (birth name Katherine)
- Kata Kalivoda (1877–1936), Hungarian artist
- Kata Kálmán (1909–1978), Hungarian photographer
- Katariina Kata Kärkkäinen, birth name of Katariina Souri (born 1968), Finnish author
- Kata Kondricz (born 1998), Hungarian foil fencer
- Kata Menczinger (born 1989), Hungarian water polo player (birth name Katalin)
- Kata Pejnović (1899–1966), Croatian Serb feminist and politician
- Kata Szidónia Petrőczy (1659–1708), Hungarian writer and poet
- Kata Tisza (born 1980), Hungarian writer (birth name Katalin)
- Kata Vas (born 2001), Hungarian racing cyclist
- Kata Wéber (born 1980), Hungarian screenwriter and playwright

== See also ==
- Kata (disambiguation)
- Kaja (name)
