= Kata (disambiguation) =

Kata is a martial arts term referring to a pattern of defense-and-attack.

Kata may also refer to:

== People ==
- Kata (given name), includes a list of people with the name
- Kata (surname), includes a list of people with the name
- Kata people or Katirs, alternative name for a tribal group of Afghanistan
- Kata (daughter of George I of Georgia) (fl. 1000s), a princess of the Bagrationi dynasty
- Kata (daughter of David IV of Georgia) (fl. 1100s), a princess of the Bagrationi dynasty

== Places ==
- Kata, Myanmar, town in Kachin State, Myanmar
- Kata, Iran, village in Sadat Mahmudi Rural District, Pataveh District, Dana County, Kohgiluyeh and Boyer-Ahmad Province, Iran
- Kata, Tibet, village in the Tibet Autonomous Region, China
- Kata, Estonia, village in Kose Parish, Harju County, Estonia

== Other uses ==
- Kata (programming), exercises in programming which help hone skills through practice and repetition
- Kata (mathematics), a name proposed by Charles Howard Hinton for a direction in a fourth spatial dimension
- KATA (AM), a California radio station
- KATA-CD, a Dallas, TX, television station
- Kata Station, a train station in Owase, Japan
- Katakana, a character set in the Japanese writing language
- Ovine rinderpest, or kata, a contagious disease of sheep, goats, and other animals
- Kata, a Grenada drum
- Kata, a 1970 horror novel by Indian writer Narayan Dharap

== See also ==
- Katar (disambiguation)
- Katha (disambiguation)
- Katta (disambiguation)
- Khata, a Tibetan ceremonial scarf
