= Sebastohypertatos =

Sebastohypertatos (Greek: σεβαστοϋπέρτατος, lit. 'the supreme venerable one') was a Byzantine honorific title. The title formed the basis for a further compound title, protosebastohypertatos (Greek: πρωτοσεβαστοϋπέρτατος, lit. 'the first supreme venerable one').

These titles were part of the reordering of the Byzantine titulature under the Komnenian emperors, where titles formed around the formerly imperial epithet sebastos (the Greek translation of Augustus) were created to denote kinship with the emperor. As such, sebastohypertatos and protosebastohypertatos were among the titles accorded to the emperor's sons-in-law (gambroi). According to Lucien Stiernon protosebastohypertatos was awarded to husbands of the third daughter of a Byzantine emperors, and sebastohypertatos to the husband of the fourth; while the husband of the second one bore the title of panhypersebastos, and of the first that of Caesar. Sebastohypertatos and protosebastohypertatos both appear for the first time in the reign of John II Komnenos (r. 1118–1143): Manuel Anemas, who married John's third daughter Theodora, assumed the latter, while Theodore Vatatzes who married John's fourth daughter Eudokia, and Constantine Angelos, who married Alexios' fourth daughter Theodora, assumed the former.

In letters addressed to the bearers of these titles, forms such as panhyperprotosebastohypertatos (Greek: πανυπερπρωτοσεβαστοϋπέρτατος, lit. 'the first supreme venerable one, above all') and panhyperprotopansebastohypertatos (Greek: πανυπερπρωτοπανσεβαστοϋπέρτατος, lit. 'the first above all supreme venerable one, above all') appear, but these are merely rhetoric augmentations of the proper titles.

== Sources ==
- Magdalino, Paul (2002) [1993]. The Empire of Manuel I Komnenos, 1143–1180. Cambridge: Cambridge University Press. ISBN 0-521-52653-1.
- Stiernon, Lucien (1965). "Notes de titulature et de prosopographie byzantines. Sébaste et Gambros". Revue des études byzantines (in French). 23: 222–243. doi:10.3406/rebyz.1965.1349.
