= Kata of Georgia =

Kata of Georgia may refer to:

- Kata (daughter of George I of Georgia) (fl. 1000s), a princess of the Bagrationi dynasty
- Kata (daughter of David IV of Georgia) (fl. 1100s), a princess of the Bagrationi dynasty
