= Katta =

Katta may refer to:

== Places ==
- Katta District, Miyagi, Miyagi Prefecture, Japan
- Katta, a town in Sindhudurg District, Maharashtra, India
- Oslo Cathedral School, or "Katta", Oslo, Norway

== People ==
- Deva Katta, Indian American film director and screenwriter
- Katta Subramanya Naidu (born 1960), Indian politician in Karnataka
- Katta Subba Rao (1940–1988), Indian film director
- Katta Shekar Reddy, Indian journalist

== See also ==
- Kata (disambiguation)
- Katar (disambiguation)
- Katha (disambiguation)
- Khata, a Tibetan ceremonial scarf
