= Katay =

Katay may refer to:

- Katay (Greyhawk deity), a fictional character in Dungeons & Dragons
- Katay (given name), Georgian feminine given name
- Katay Don Sasorith (1904–1959), Laotian politician and author
- Mihály Kátay (c. 1565–1607), Hungarian soldier and nobleman

== See also ==
- Catay
