= Katha =

Katha may refer to:

== Films ==
- Katha (1983 film), an Indian romantic comedy
- Katha (2009 film), an Indian Telugu thriller

== Places ==
=== In India ===
- Katha, Bagpat, a village in Uttar Pradesh

=== In Myanmar ===
- Katha District, a district in Sagaing Region
  - Katha Township, a township in Katha District
    - Katha, Myanmar, a town in the township and administrative center of the district

== Other uses ==
- Catechu, an extract of acacia, called katha in Hindi
- Katha (moth), a genus of tiger moths
- Katha (NGO), a non-profit and non-governmental organisation based in Delhi
  - Katha Books, a publishing house owned by Katha NGO
- Katha Pollitt (born 1949), American feminist writer
- Katha (storytelling format), an Indian style of religious storytelling
- Katha (unit), a unit of measurement, largely obsolete in India and Bangladesh but still used in Nepal
- Katha Upanishad, a Hindu sacred text

== See also ==
- Kaṭha (disambiguation)
- Catha (disambiguation)
- Kata (disambiguation)
- Katta (disambiguation)
- Katha Sangama (disambiguation)
- Khata, a Tibetan ceremonial scarf
