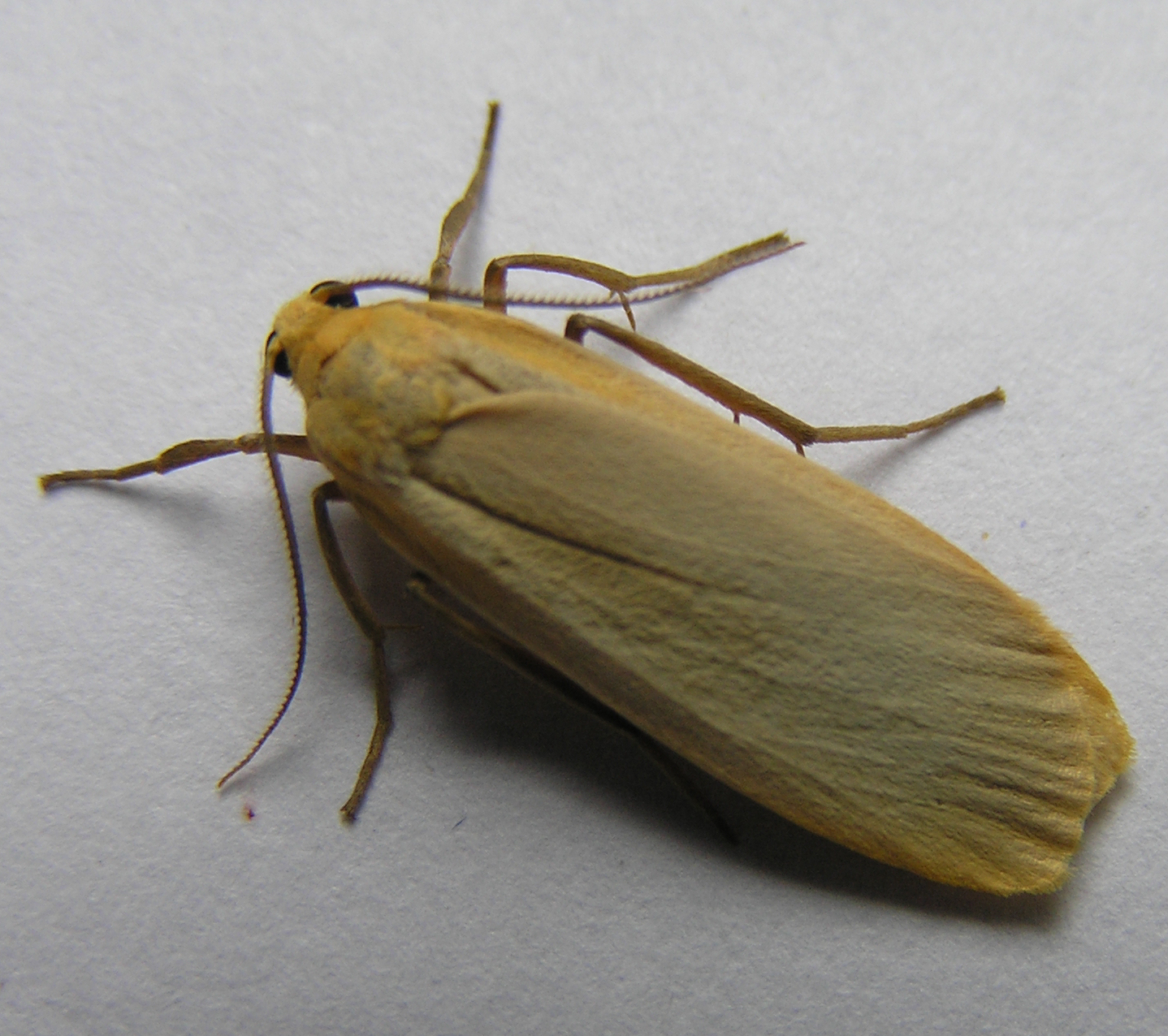

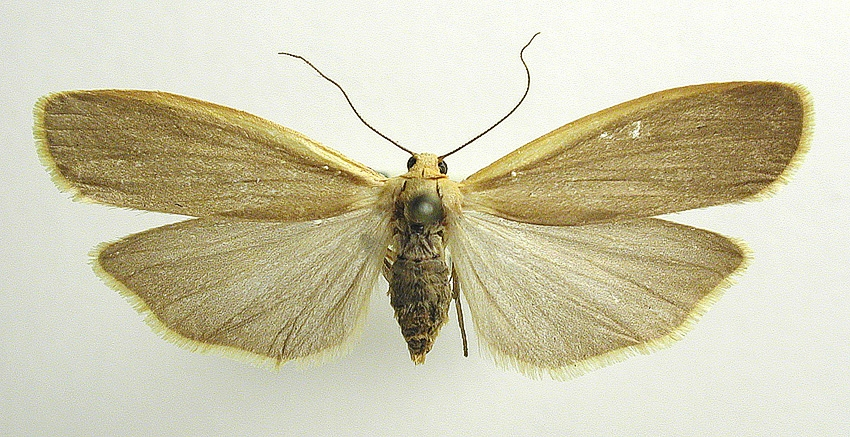

Scientific classification
- Domain: Eukaryota
- Kingdom: Animalia
- Phylum: Arthropoda
- Class: Insecta
- Order: Lepidoptera
- Superfamily: Noctuoidea
- Family: Erebidae
- Subfamily: Arctiinae
- Genus: Katha
- Species: K. depressa

Binomial name
- Katha depressa (Esper, 1787)

Synonyms
- List: Phalaena deplana Esper, 1787; Eilema deplana; Phalaena depressa Esper, 1787; Eilema depressa; Katha deplana; Eilema depressum; Noctua complana Esper, 1787 (preocc. Linnaeus); Noctua luteola Hübner, 1788; Bombyx helvola Hübner, [1803]; Bombyx ochreola Hübner, [1803]; Lithosia helveola Ochsenheimer, 1810; Lithosia deplana var. unicolor Bankes, 1902; Lithosia deplana ab. atra Torstenius, 1956; Lithosia deplana f. albescens Lempke, 1961; Lithosia deplana f. flavescens Lempke, 1961; Lithosia pavescens Butler, 1877; Eilema depressa bergmani Bryk, 1948; Eilema confusa Miyake, 1907; Lithosia nihonica Daniel, 1954

= Katha depressa =

Species of moth

Katha depressa, the buff footman, is a moth of the family Erebidae found in Asia and Europe. It was first described by Eugenius Johann Christoph Esper in 1787.

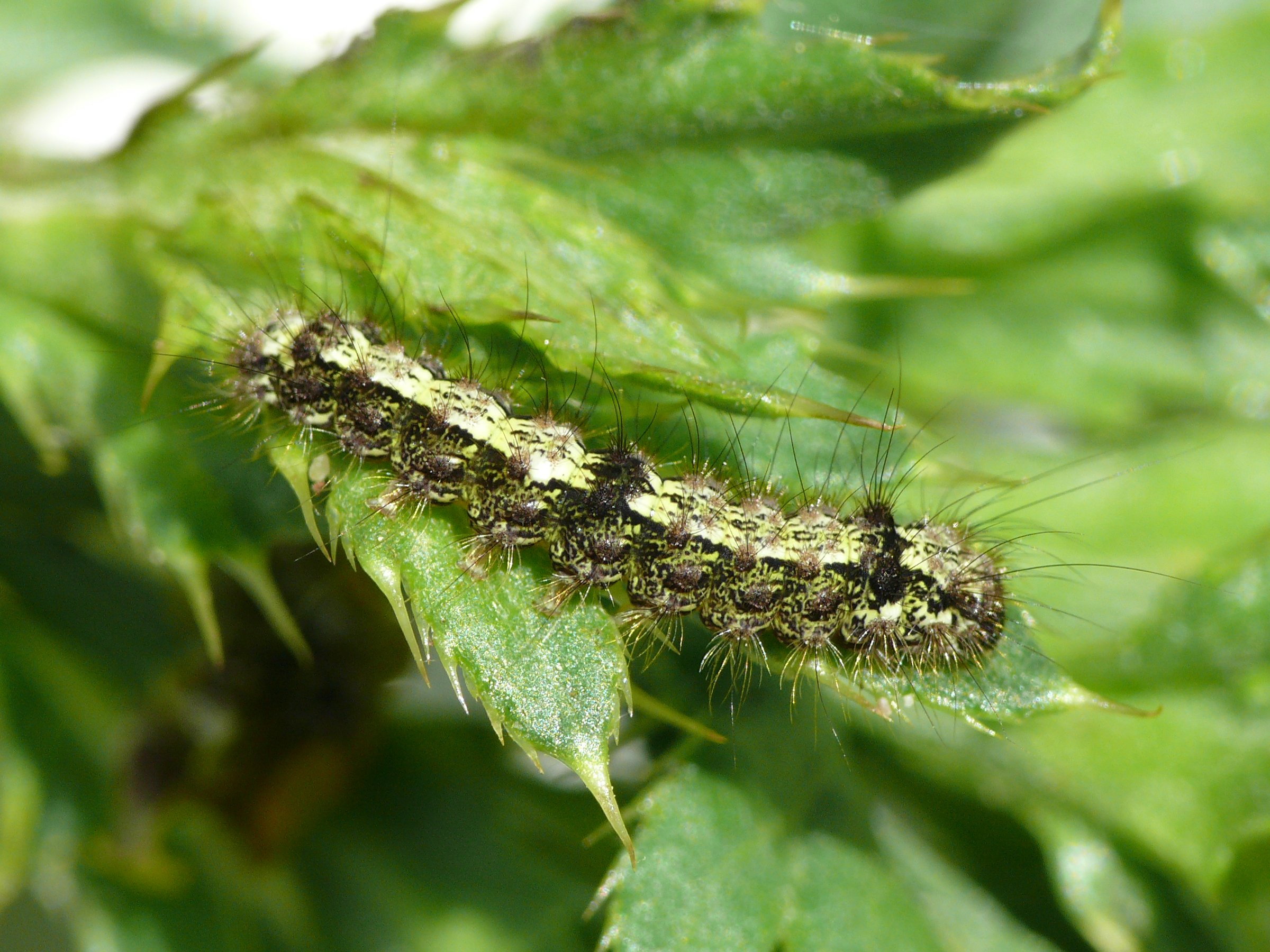
Caterpillar

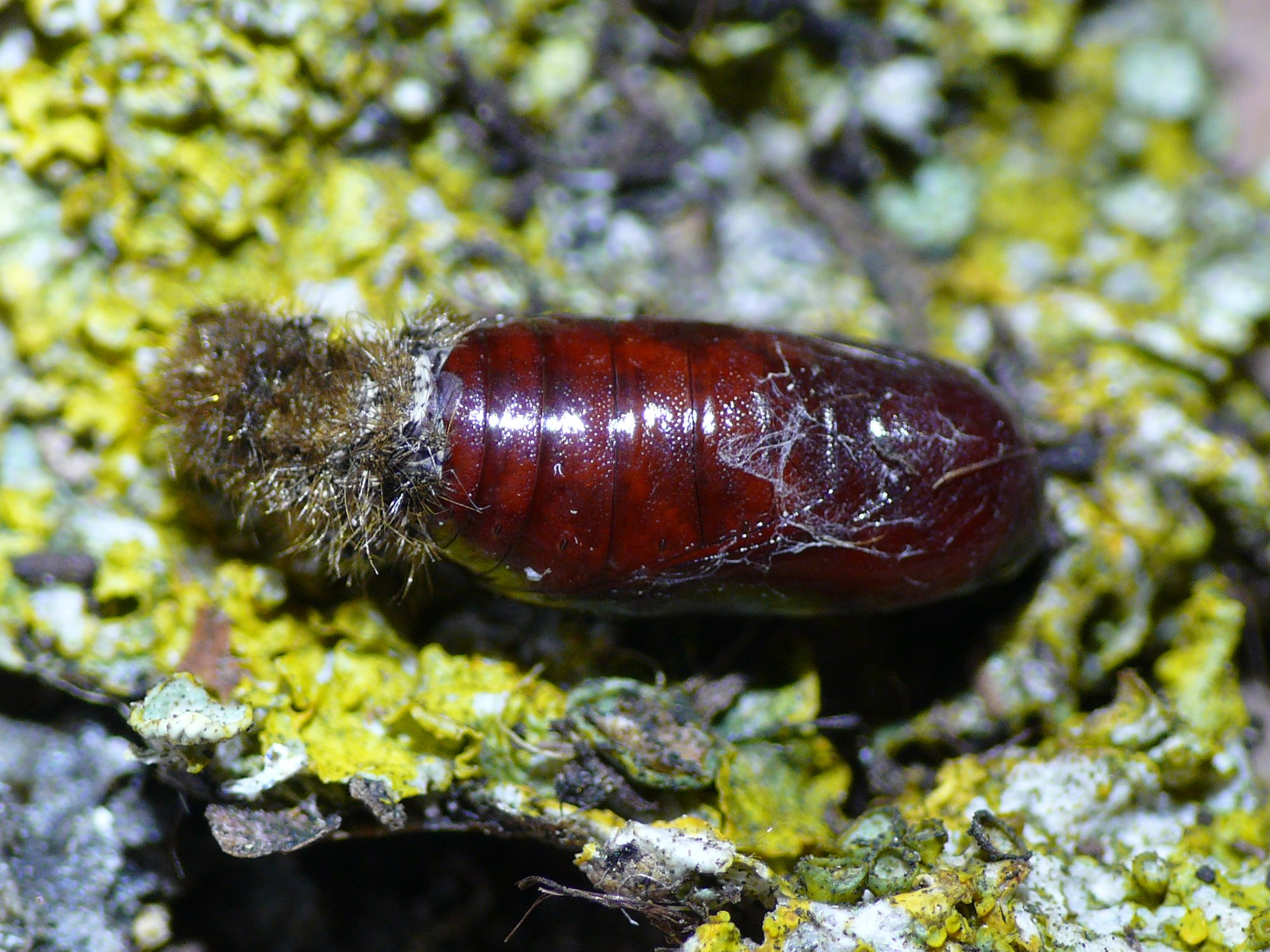
Pupa

== Technical description and variation ==
The length of the forewings is 15–17 mm. Both wings dark brown grey, with the costa of the forewing and the fringes light bright yellow, especially in the female. The ground colour is often more or less lightened with ochreous, sometimes almost clay-colour (ochreola Hbn.), or nearly whitish (helveola Ochs.) or of an indefinite intermediate shade (luteola Hbn.). In pavescens Butl. from Hokkaido (Island of Yezo), the wings are dirty greyish yellow; the hindwing lighter.

=== Subspecies ===
- Katha deplana deplana
- Katha deplana pavescens (Butler, 1877) (Russia: Middle Amur, Primorye, Sakhalin, Kunashir; Korea; Japan)

== Biology ==
Larvae are a dirty lead-grey colour, bearing a yellow dorsal stripe with dark edges and three raised black transverse spots anteriorly, posteriorly and in the centre, and black markings laterally. The larvae feed on lichen and algae, especially on conifer trees, but also on oak (Quercus species) and heathers (Calluna species). Until June, on lichens on trees. Pupa glossy red brown. The moths are found singly but are not rare and can be fly in June to September.

They can be found during the day resting in trees and bushes and can also be found by beating from young conifers.

== Distribution ==
It is found from western Europe east through the Palearctic (northern Asia Minor, Crimea, Abkhazia, Transcaucasia, southern Siberia, Middle Amur, Primorye, Sakhalin, Kunashir, Zhejiang) to Korea and Japan.
