= Irene of Hungary =

Byzantine empress from 1104 to 1134

Saint Irene of Hungary
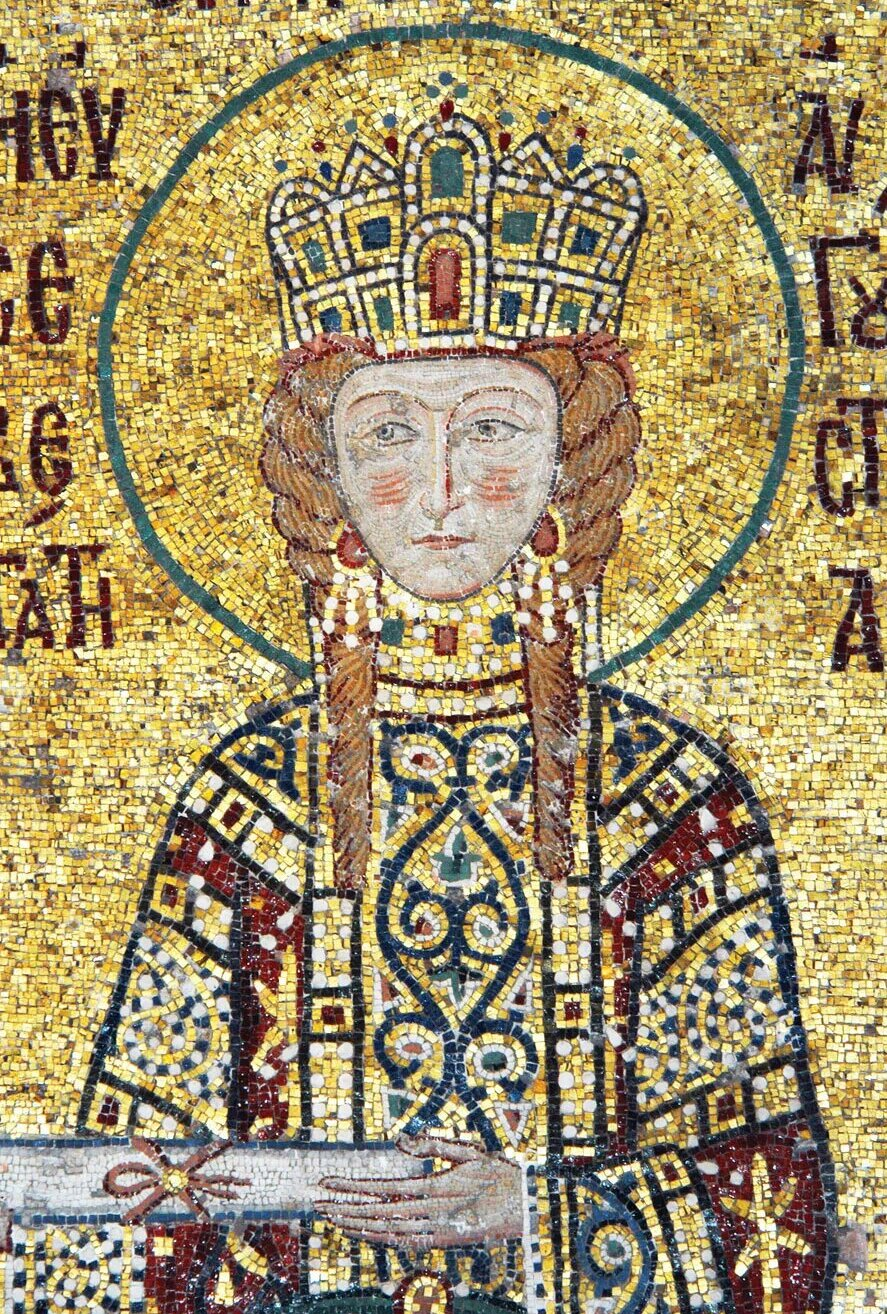
- Mosaic portrait of Empress Irene on the Comnenos mosaic in the Hagia Sophia, Constantinople (now Istanbul), (c. 1118)

Empress consort of the Byzantine Empire
- Tenure: 1104 – 13 August 1134 (with Irene Doukaina, 1104–1118)
- Born: Piroska; 1088; Kingdom of Hungary
- Died: 13 August 1134 (aged 45–46); Bithynia region, Byzantine Empire
- Spouse: John II Komnenos (m. 1104)
- Issue more...: Alexios Komnenos; Andronikos Komnenos; Isaac Komnenos; Manuel I Komnenos
- House: House of Árpád
- Father: Ladislaus I of Hungary
- Mother: Adelaide of Swabia
- Religion: Eastern Orthodox (after conversion from Catholicism)

Irene of Hungary (Hungarian: Szent Piroska, Greek: Αγία Ειρήνη της Ουγγαρίας, born Piroska; 1088 – 13 August 1134) was the Byzantine empress by marriage to John II Komnenos. The Byzantine Empire was at its height during this period, and her husband, John II, has been regarded as the greatest of the Komnenian emperors. She is venerated as a saint in the Eastern Orthodox Church and is sometimes listed as the Blessed Irene of Hungary (post-congregation) by some Catholic sources, but not by others. Although Hungary belongs to the Western Catholic Church, Piroska is venerated there as a Hungarian saint.

== Name ==
The original Hungarian form of her name cannot be determined with complete certainty, it first mentioned in the Chronicon Pictum, which refers to the daughter of Saint Ladislaus as Pyrisk. If Pyrisk is not a rendering of the name Piros but of Piroska, it is unclear why the final -a is omitted, which would have made the name declinable in the Latin text, and why an i appears in place of the o. If the name is instead derived from the Latin Prisca, the omission of the final -a is even more difficult to explain. There is no trace among the Árpáds of the veneration or even knowledge of Saint Prisca, moreover, both the name Prisca and Piroska are otherwise unknown in the Árpád period. The Latin name Prisca, literally meaning 'ancient', but implying 'serious' or 'grave' behaviour.

On her deathbed, in accordance with the Byzantine customs of the era, she took monastic vows, became a monastic (nun), taking on the monastic name Xene.

== Life ==
=== Family ===
Piroska was born in 1088, the daughter of King Ladislaus I of Hungary and Adelaide of Rheinfelden. She was orphaned at an early age, while still a child: her mother died in 1090, and her father died on 29 July 1095. King Ladislaus I was succeeded by his nephew, Coloman. Piroska spent her youth under the supervision and at the court of her cousin, King Coloman of Hungary, known as Coloman the Learned, where she received a thorough education. At the age of 16, she met the customary fate of medieval princesses, becoming the fiancée of a man she had never personally met, and shortly thereafter she became his wife in 1104. The chosen groom was the dynastic heir of the Byzantine Komnenos dynasty.

=== Empress consort of the Byzantine Empire ===
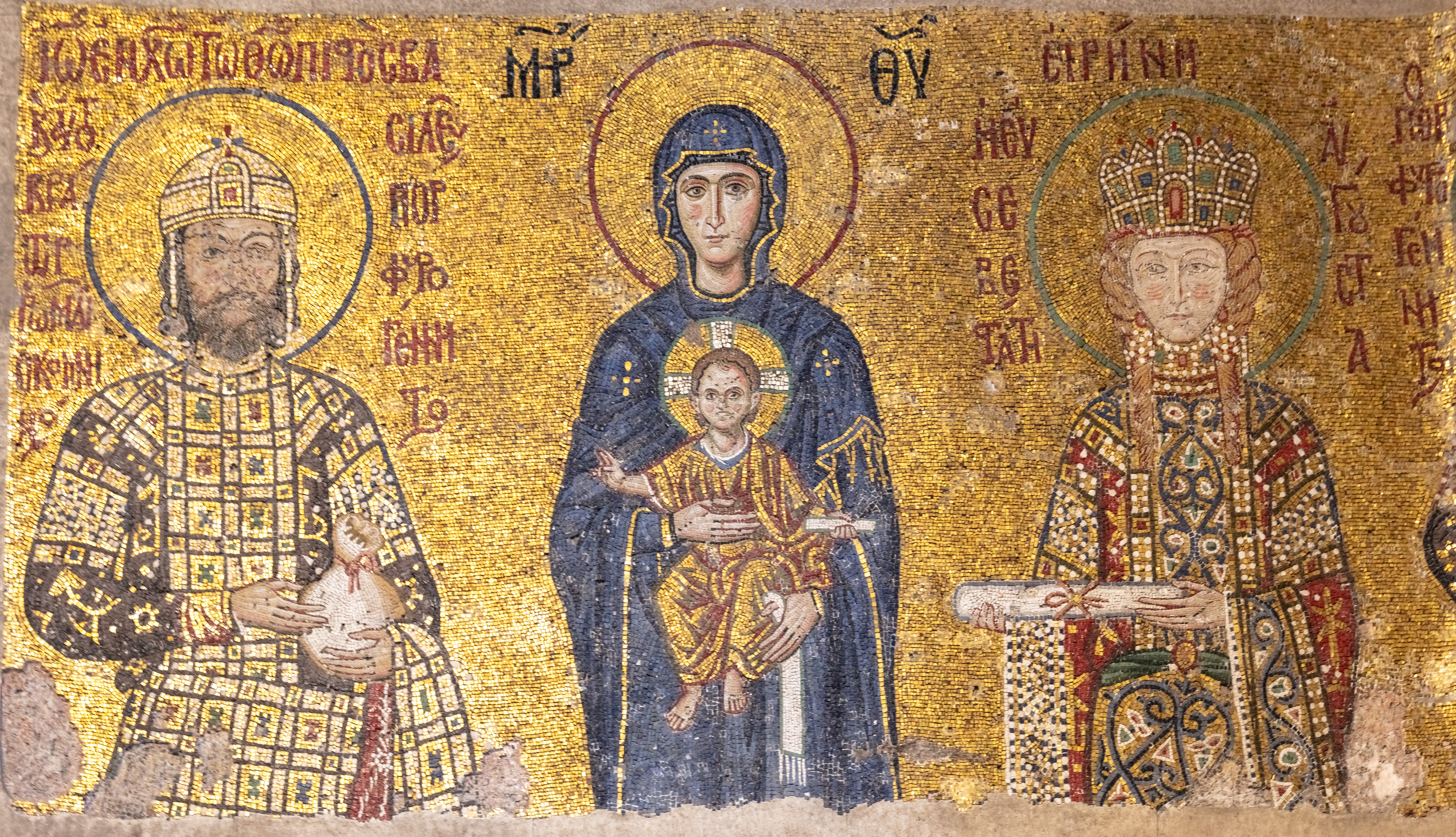
Komnenos mosaic at Hagia Sophia: Mary the Virgin in the center, Emperor John II Komnenos on the left, and Empress Irene on the right (c. 1118)

In an effort to improve relations with Emperor Alexios I Komnenos of the Byzantine Empire, King Coloman of Hungary arranged the marriage of his cousin, Piroska, to John "the Beautiful" Komnenos, the eldest son of Alexios I and Irene Doukaina, who had been co-ruler with his father since 1092 and was expected to succeed him. In her historical work, Anna Komnene mentions a treaty between Alexios and Coloman in which the emperor refers to the Hungarian king as sympentheros (co-father-in-law), however, this term simply reflects the dynastic marriage of the Hungarian princess and the fact that the family tie served to strengthen political relations between the two rulers. The negotiations were successful and Piroska married John in 1104. The marriage was recorded by Joannes Zonaras and John Kinnamos. During the marriage, John was already the designated heir to the throne, so it was known that Piroska would later be crowned Empress of the Roman Empire (the term "Byzantine Empire" is a modern historiographical designation, at the time, the state was regarded as the Roman Empire, and its people called themselves Romans).

When the Hungarian princess arrived in her new homeland, the Komnenos dynasty and Byzantium itself was at its height. Her husband, John II, succeeded his father in 1118 and was later regarded as the greatest of the Komnenian emperors. Upon her settlement in Constantinople, Piroska was renamed Irene. As Byzantine empress, she was required to convert to the Eastern Orthodox faith, a name also borne by her mother-in-law, Irene Doukaina, as well as several other Byzantine empresses of the time. Greek authors generally mention her foreign origin, which was unusual for the period, as she was the first Western empress to sit on the Byzantine throne in a long time. A lifelong and harmonious relationship developed between John and Irene, as attested by numerous contemporary written sources.

Greek sources record that she gave birth to eight children, four sons and four daughters. In 1106, she gave birth to twins in Thessaloniki, Alexios and Maria. Irene's fourth and youngest son, had been born in 1118, the very year his parents ascended the throne, he later inherited the imperial crown from his father as Emperor Manuel I Komnenos (1143–1180). The contemporary Byzantine writer Theodore Prodromos composed a poem for the 1119 coronation of the imperial couple's first son, Alexios Komnenos, as co-emperor. A substantial portion of the work is devoted to the praise of the empress, with Irene of Hungary's lineage celebrated in highly extravagant terms. He described her as the "Mistress of the entire West", presenting the imperial union in an almost cosmic dimension as the symbolic unification of East and West.

Foreign delegations were frequently received at the court of Irene, she welcomed pilgrims from the Holy Land as well as envoys from Hungary, and on several occasions acted as a mediator in political affairs between the Kingdom of Hungary and the Byzantine Empire. During the reign of King Stephen II of Hungary (1116–1131), the son of King Coloman, Byzantine–Hungarian relations deteriorated. Between 1127 and 1129, a Byzantine–Hungarian War was fought, partly due to injuries suffered by Hungarian merchants, and partly because the Byzantine court had granted asylum to the blinded Prince Álmos, the uncle of Coloman. During the reign of King Béla II of Hungary, son of Álmos, a renewed period of peace prevailed between the Kingdom of Hungary and the Byzantine Empire.

Irene played little part in government, devoting herself to piety and her many children. She was, with her husband, the patron of the construction of the Monastery of Christ Pantokrator in Constantinople (now Zeyrek Mosque, Istanbul). The monastery contained three churches and a hospital of 5 wards, which was open to people of all social classes. Irene devoted herself to extensive charitable activities from the very beginning, much like many other female saints of the House of Árpád. She was the principal initiator of the construction of the Pantokrator Monastery complex, and continuously oversaw the project throughout its development. Hagiographic sources describe the Monastery of the Pantokrator as the greatest accomplishment of her life, alongside its religious function, the complex also housed a hospital and a residence for the elderly.

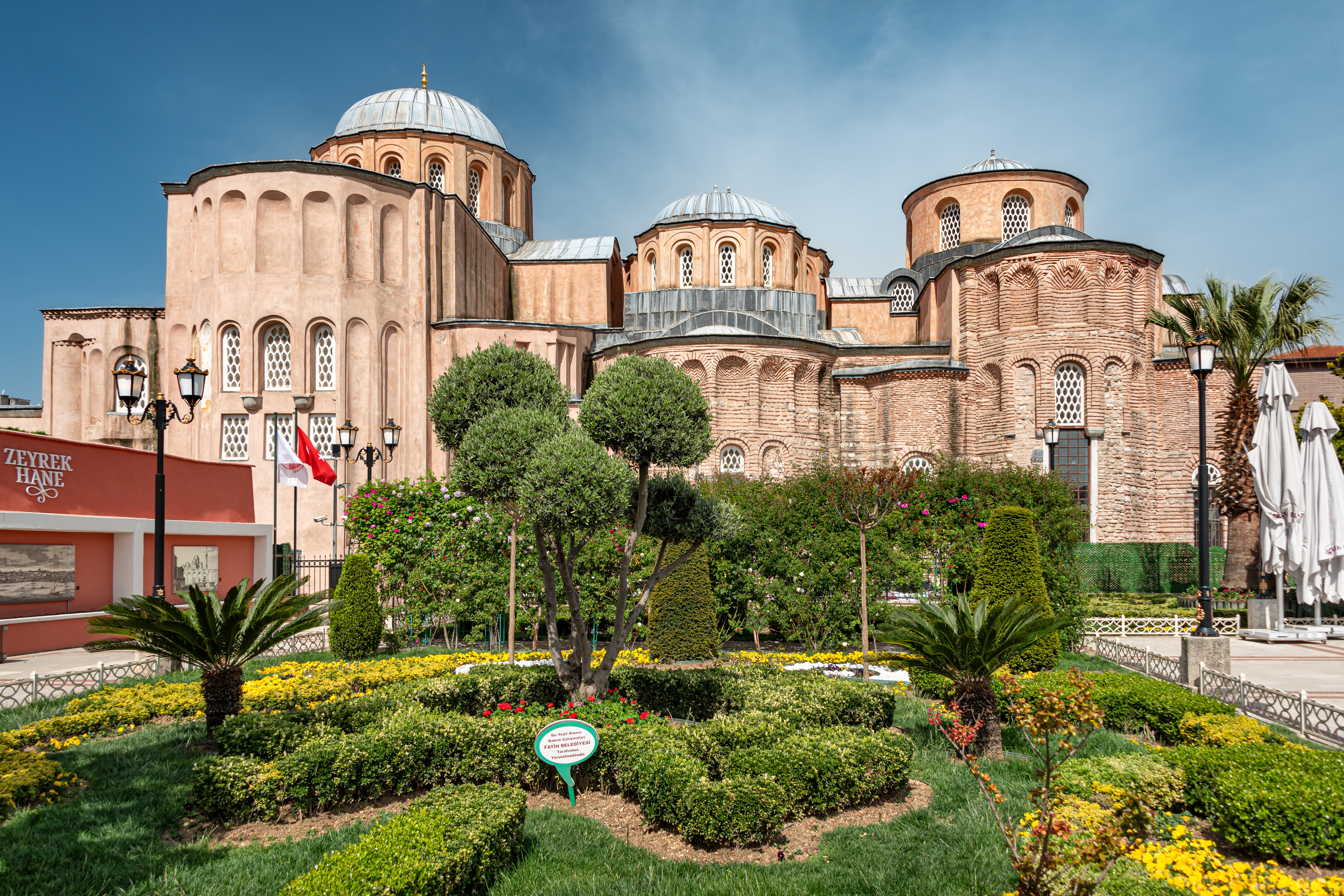
Monastery of Christ Pantokrator (now Zeyrek Mosque, Istanbul)

The hospital section of the complex was exceptionally large by the standards of its age, and the regulations governing its operation have survived. These documents show that already at the beginning of the 12th century the institution functioned according to remarkably advanced medical and administrative principles. Comparable hospitals in Western Europe adopted similar practices only much later, possibly influenced by knowledge of the Pantokrator complex. For this reason, the Pantokrator monastery-hospital, closely associated with the life's work of Empress Irene, may be regarded as one of the important precursors of modern European healthcare.

Until the end of her life, Empress Irene remained devoted to supporting the poor, the vulnerable, and the sick, although she did not live to see the consecration of the Pantokrator monastery-hospital.

=== Death ===
Irene died unexpectedly on 13 August 1134 in Bithynia region, where she had accompanied her husband, John II Komnenos, on his campaign against the Seljuk Turks. The emperor had his wife buried in the Monastery of the Pantokrator and later chose it as his own final resting place. The monastery became the burial site of the Komnenos and later the Palaiologos dynasties. Irene was later venerated as Saint Irene.

John declares that the monastery had been the initiative of his late wife and, in moving words, expresses his grief:

I offer to You [God] what is already Yours – she through whom I found a companion in planning and execution, my partner in life and my helper – even though, before the work was fully completed, she departed from this world according to Your mysterious decree, and by her departure left me here torn in two.

— John II Komnenos – Foundation charter of Monastery of Christ Pantokrator

I descend from blessed ancestors, from the kings of the entire Western Empire; I was raised by the Julius Caesars and crowned with beauty by the Graces.

— Theodore Prodromos – The empress's epitaph

After the Ottoman conquest of Constantinople in 1453, the Monastery of the Pantokrator was converted into a mosque, and the old imperial tombs subsequently fell into decay.

== Depiction at Hagia Sophia ==
At Hagia Sophia, in a mosaic dated circa 1118, Empress Irene is depicted as a fair-haired, rosy-cheeked empress in rigid ceremonial attire. Saint Piroska is the only member of the Árpád royal dynasty from whom a contemporary depiction made during her lifetime has survived. No similar portrait of any other member of the Árpád dynasty is known.

== Issue ==
Irene and John had eight children. The primary source about their order of births is the chronicle of Niketas Choniates:

1. Alexios Komnenos (1106 – 1142), co-emperor from 1119 to 1142. His birth is recorded in the Alexiad by Anna Komnene.
2. Maria Komnene (1106 – 1144/51), twin to Alexios, who married John Rogerios Dalassenos.
3. Andronikos Komnenos (c. 1108 – 1142).
4. Anna Komnene (c. 1110 – after 1149), who married the admiral Stephen Kontostephanos, who died in battle in 1149. The couple had four children.
5. Isaac Komnenos (c. 1113 – after 1146), raised to sebastokrator in 1122, was superseded in the succession in favour of Manuel in 1143, he married twice and had several children.
6. Theodora Komnene (c. 1115 – 1157), who married the military commander Manuel Anemas, who was killed in action, after which she entered a monastery. The couple had at least four children.
7. Eudokia Komnene (c. 1116 – before 1150), who married the military commander Theodore Vatatzes. She had at least six children, but died early.
8. Manuel I Komnenos (1118 – 1180), Eastern Roman emperor from 1143 to 1180.

== Legacy ==
=== Sainthood and veneration ===
Irene was canonised during the reign of her son, Emperor Manuel I Komnenos, most likely in 1166, making her the only canonised empress of 12th-century Byzantium. At the time of Irene's canonisation, Prince Béla (the future King Béla III of Hungary), a relative of Irene, was living at the Byzantine court as heir to the imperial throne. Later on Béla initiated the canonisation of Irene's father, King Ladislaus I of Hungary, later venerated as Saint Ladislaus.

Irene's sainthood was first recognized by the Orthodox Christian Church, and later also by the Catholic Church, both of which venerate her as a saint. Although she was canonized by the Eastern Orthodox Church, in Hungary (which belong to Western Catholic Church) Piroska is venerated as a Hungarian saint.

== Sources ==
- Hendy, Michael F. (1999). Catalogue of the Byzantine Coins in the Dumbarton Oaks Collection. Vol. 4. Dumbarton Oaks. p. 244. ISBN 9780884022336.
- Varzos, Konstantinos (1984). Η Γενεαλογία των Κομνηνών [The Genealogy of the Komnenoi] (PDF) (in Greek). Vol. A1. Thessaloniki: Centre for Byzantine Studies, University of Thessaloniki.
- Joannes Zonaras, Extracts of History.
- John Kinnamos, Chronicle.
- Anna Komnene, Alexiad
- Niketas Choniates, Chronicle

Irene of Hungary Árpád dynasty Died: 1134
Royal titles
Preceded by Irene Doukaina	Byzantine Empress consort 1118–1134	Succeeded by Bertha of Sulzbach
