= Catha =

Catha may refer to:

- Catha (plant), a plant genus
- Catha (mythology), an Etruscan goddess

== See also ==
- Katha (disambiguation)
