= Katha prabana =

Scientific classification
- Domain: Eukaryota
- Kingdom: Animalia
- Phylum: Arthropoda
- Class: Insecta
- Order: Lepidoptera
- Superfamily: Noctuoidea
- Family: Erebidae
- Subfamily: Arctiinae
- Genus: Katha
- Species: K. prabana

Binomial name
- Katha prabana (Moore, 1859)

Synonyms
- Lithosia prabana Moore, 1859; Lithosia nigricans Walker, 1862; Lithosia lurida Snellen, 1880; Tmetoptera costosa Felder & Rogenhofer, 1875; Eilema prabana celebesa Tams, 1935; Eilema celebesa Tams, 1935; Dubatolova prabana (Moore, 1859)

Species of moth

Katha prabana is a moth of the family Erebidae first described by Frederic Moore in 1859. It is found on the Sula Islands, Borneo, Sumatra, Java, Bali, Sulawesi, the Moluccas and in Myanmar. The habitat consists of lowland areas.

Adults are mostly dark blackish grey, with a narrow pale yellow forewing costa.
