= Kaṭha =

- Shakha, a Hindu theological school
  - Kaṭha Upaniṣad, one of the mukhya Upanishads
  - Aranyaka, part of the Vedas concerned with the meaning of ritual sacrifice
- Katha is the Hindi name for catechu, an extract of acacia used in Ayurvedic medicine

== See also ==
- Katha (disambiguation)
