= Katha laevis =

Scientific classification
- Domain: Eukaryota
- Kingdom: Animalia
- Phylum: Arthropoda
- Class: Insecta
- Order: Lepidoptera
- Superfamily: Noctuoidea
- Family: Erebidae
- Subfamily: Arctiinae
- Genus: Katha
- Species: K. laevis

Binomial name
- Katha laevis (Butler, 1877)

Synonyms
- Lithosia laevis Butler, 1877; Eilema laevis; Katha aprica Butler, 1885; Eilema aprica; Lithosia hakiensis Matsumura, 1930; Eilema hakiensis; Tinea plumella Thunberg, 1788

Species of moth

Katha laevis is a moth of the family Erebidae. It is found in Japan.

The wingspan is 32–35 mm.
