= Katha nankunshanica =

Scientific classification
- Kingdom: Animalia
- Phylum: Arthropoda
- Class: Insecta
- Order: Lepidoptera
- Superfamily: Noctuoidea
- Family: Erebidae
- Subfamily: Arctiinae
- Genus: Katha
- Species: K. nankunshanica

Binomial name
- Katha nankunshanica Dubatolov, Kishida & Wang, 2012

Species of moth

Katha nankunshanica is a moth of the family Erebidae. It is found in Guangdong, China.

The length of the forewings is about 15 millimetres (0.59 in). The forewings are greyish-yellow and the hindwings are pure yellow.
