= Katha conformis =

Scientific classification
- Kingdom: Animalia
- Phylum: Arthropoda
- Class: Insecta
- Order: Lepidoptera
- Superfamily: Noctuoidea
- Family: Erebidae
- Subfamily: Arctiinae
- Genus: Katha
- Species: K. conformis

Binomial name
- Katha conformis (Walker, 1854)

Synonyms
- Lithosia conformis Walker, 1854; Lithosia nigrifrons Moore, 1878

Species of moth

Katha conformis is a moth of the family Erebidae. It is found in India, Thailand and China (Shanxi, Zhejiang, Fujian, Jiangxi, Hunan, Guangxi, Sichuan, Guizhou, Hubei, Yunnan and Guangdong).
