= Katha nigropoda =

Scientific classification
- Domain: Eukaryota
- Kingdom: Animalia
- Phylum: Arthropoda
- Class: Insecta
- Order: Lepidoptera
- Superfamily: Noctuoidea
- Family: Erebidae
- Subfamily: Arctiinae
- Genus: Katha
- Species: K. nigropoda

Binomial name
- Katha nigropoda (Bremer & Grey, 1852)

Synonyms
- Lithosia nigropoda Bremer & Grey, 1852; Eilema nigripodum; Eilema nigripoda; Eilema nigropoda; Katha nigripoda; Lithosia insolita Walker, 1854; Lithosia praecipua Walker, [1865]

Species of moth of the family Erebidae

Katha nigropoda is a moth of the family Erebidae first described by Otto Vasilievich Bremer and William Grey in 1852. It is found in Russia (Primorye, Ussurijsk) and China (Beijing, Shanghai, Zhejiang, Fujiang).
