= Katha rungsi =

Scientific classification
- Kingdom: Animalia
- Phylum: Arthropoda
- Class: Insecta
- Order: Lepidoptera
- Superfamily: Noctuoidea
- Family: Erebidae
- Subfamily: Arctiinae
- Genus: Katha
- Species: K. rungsi

Binomial name
- Katha rungsi (Toulgoët, 1960)

Synonyms
- Eilema rungsi Toulgoët, 1960; Pelosia hellenica Derra & Hacker, 1983

Species of moth

Katha rungsi is a moth of the family Erebidae first described by Hervé de Toulgoët in 1960. It is found in north-western Africa (Morocco), Portugal, Italy, Spain and Greece.
