= Katay (given name) =

Katay (Georgian: კატაჲ), shortened Kata, is a feminine Georgian name. Notable people with the name include:

- Kata (daughter of George I of Georgia) (fl. 1000s), a princess of the Bagrationi dynasty
- Kata (daughter of David IV of Georgia) (fl. 1100s), a princess of the Bagrationi dynasty
