= Katha suffusa =

Scientific classification
- Domain: Eukaryota
- Kingdom: Animalia
- Phylum: Arthropoda
- Class: Insecta
- Order: Lepidoptera
- Superfamily: Noctuoidea
- Family: Erebidae
- Subfamily: Arctiinae
- Genus: Katha
- Species: K. suffusa

Binomial name
- Katha suffusa (Leech, 1899)

Synonyms
- Lithosia suffusa Leech, 1899; Eilema suffusa; Lithosia chekiangica Daniel, 1954; Katha chekiangica; Eilema chekiangica

Species of moth

Katha suffusa is a moth of the family Erebidae first described by John Henry Leech in 1899. It is found in western China.
