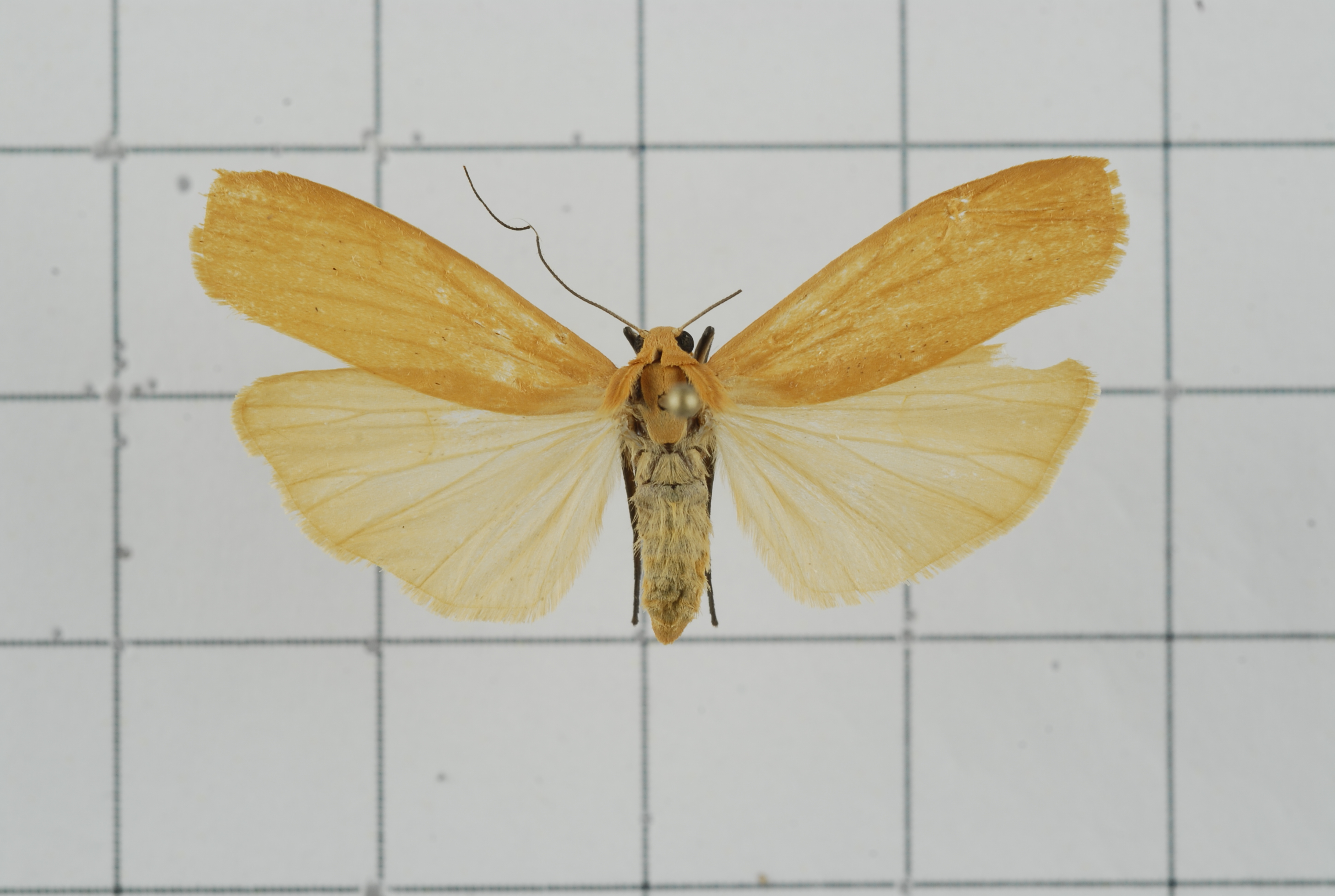

Scientific classification
- Kingdom: Animalia
- Phylum: Arthropoda
- Clade: Pancrustacea
- Class: Insecta
- Order: Lepidoptera
- Superfamily: Noctuoidea
- Family: Erebidae
- Subfamily: Arctiinae
- Genus: Katha
- Species: K. magnata

Binomial name
- Katha magnata (Matsumura, 1927)

Synonyms
- Lithosia magnata Matsumura, 1927; Eilema magnata; Lithosia chekiangica elisabethae Roesler, 1967

= Katha magnata =

Species of moth

Katha magnata is a moth of the family Erebidae. It is found in Taiwan and Guangdong, China.

== Subspecies ==
- Katha magnata magnata (Taiwan)
- Katha magnata nanlingica Dubatolov, Kishida & Wang, 2012 (China: Guangdong)
