= Katha moorei =

Scientific classification
- Domain: Eukaryota
- Kingdom: Animalia
- Phylum: Arthropoda
- Class: Insecta
- Order: Lepidoptera
- Superfamily: Noctuoidea
- Family: Erebidae
- Subfamily: Arctiinae
- Genus: Katha
- Species: K. moorei

Binomial name
- Katha moorei Leech, 1890

Synonyms
- Eilema moorei; Lithosia moorei concolor Daniel, 1954; Lithosia moorei griseata Daniel, 1954; Lithosia moorei griseotincta Daniel, 1954

Species of moth

Katha moorei is a moth of the family Erebidae first described by John Henry Leech in 1890. It is found in China.
