= Theodore Vatatzes =

Byzantine general and aristocrat

- Military career
- Allegiance: Byzantine Empire
- Rank: sebastohypertatos
- Conflicts: Siege of Zemun 1151, Capture of Tarsus 1158

Theodore Vatatzes or Batatzes (Greek: Θεόδωρος Βατάτζης) was an aristocrat and military commander in the Byzantine Empire during the reigns of John II Komnenos and Manuel I Komnenos.

== Background ==
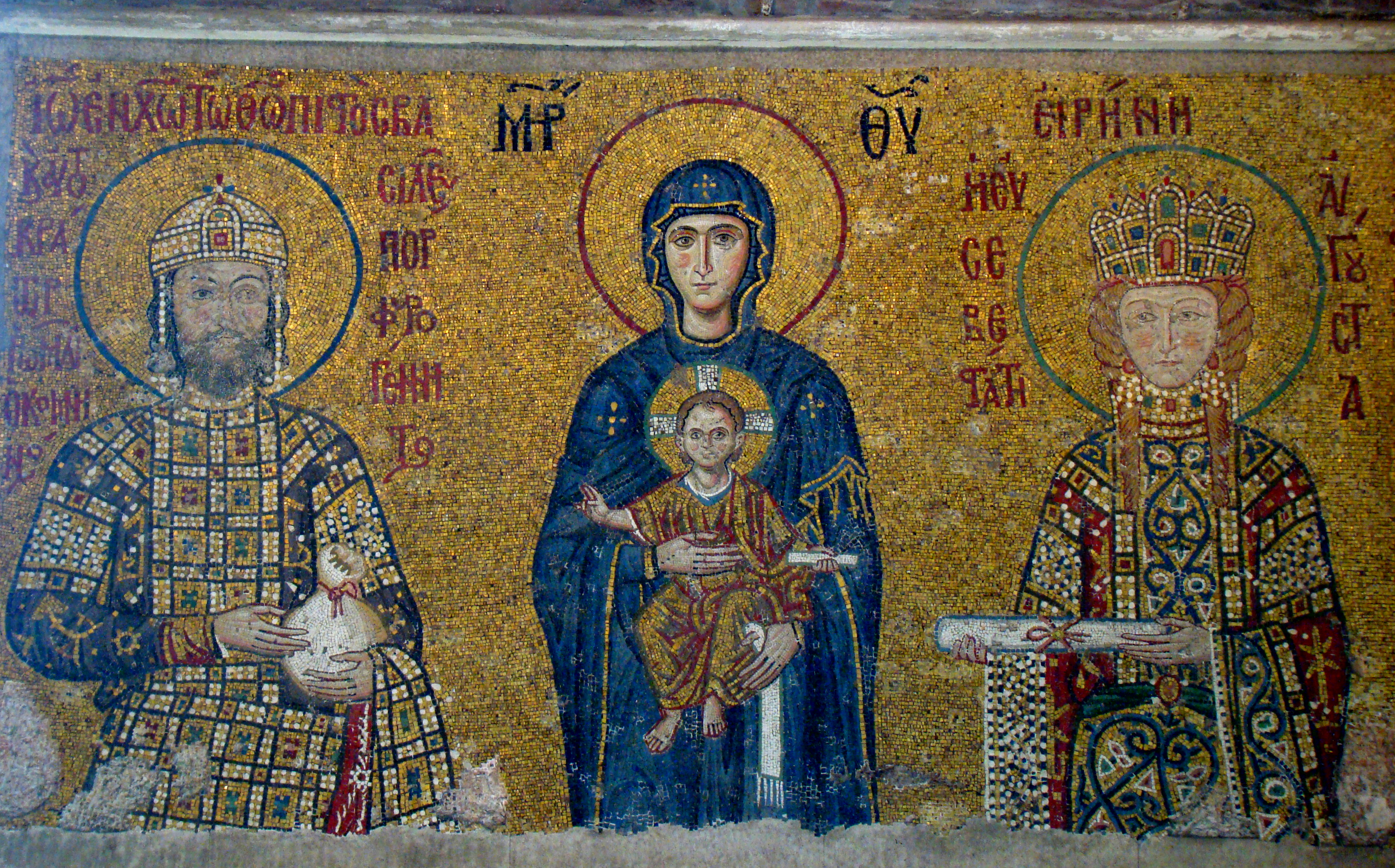
Emperor John II Komnenos and his wife Eirene, father- and mother-in-law of Theodore Vatatzes, flanking the Virgin and Child

Theodore Vatatzes was a member of the Vatatzes family, who had been prominent in the city and region of Adrianople in Thrace for a number of generations. The family rose to the first rank of the Byzantine aristocracy, and to prominence in the politics of the empire, in the person of Theodore himself. Theodore was one of a group of able men promoted to positions of authority by John II as an alternative to reliance on members of the imperial family, whom he distrusted. In 1131 Theodore married the porphyrogenita princess Eudokia Komnene, daughter of John II and his empress, Eirene of Hungary, and was raised to the court dignity of sebastohypertatos.

== Military career in the reign of Manuel I ==
Records of the military exploits of Theodore Vatatzes during the reign of John II have not survived. However, in the reign of Manuel I Komnenos, John's successor and Theodore's brother-in-law, he enters contemporary sources as a notable military commander during the 1150s. In 1151, Vatatzes was a senior general on the frontier with Hungary, he ravaged the area around the city of Zemun and maintained a blockade of the city, until it surrendered to Manuel I in person. The Armenians of Cilicia had rebelled and in 1158 Manuel I campaigned to regain control of the region; this would also open up the route to Antioch, control of which was his main goal. Theodore Vatatzes was entrusted with the capture of the major fortified city of Tarsus. Thinking that the emperor had arrived with his entire army the defenders panicked, and the city fell immediately to the Byzantine force.

== Family ==
Theodore and his wife had a number of children:

- John (c. 1132–1185), the megas domestikos, who won a notable victory over the Seljuk Turks (Battle of Hyelion and Leimocheir) and later rebelled against Andronikos I Komnenos.
- Andronikos (c. 1133–1176), also a prominent general, was killed by the Seljuk Turks when leading an expedition against Amaseia in 1176.
- a daughter, likely named Anna (c. 1136–after 1186), married Nikephoros Synadenos, and then the general Alexios Branas. Mother of Theodore Branas.
- Theodora Komnene (c. 1137–after 1185), married the general and diplomat Nikephoros Chalouphes. Noted for her beauty, she became the mistress of her uncle, Emperor Manuel I, bearing him the illegitimate son Alexios Komnenos.
- Isaac Komnenos Vatatzes (c. 1139–unknown), is only known from a poem celebrating his marriage, c. 1158, to an Irene Komnene, great-granddaughter of the sebastokrator, Isaac Komnenos, a brother of Alexios I Komnenos. Nothing further is known of the couple.
- Alexios Komnenos Vatatzes (c. 1140–after 1166), married Maria Pegonitissa c. 1158, he is last attested in the synod of Blachernae in March 1166. He was the father of Isaac Komnenos Vatatzes.
