= Manuel Anemas =

12th-century Byzantine general (died 1148)

- Died: 1148
- Military career
- Allegiance: Byzantine Empire

Manuel Anemas was an aristocrat and military commander in the Byzantine Empire during the reigns of John II Komnenos and Manuel I Komnenos.

== Background and life ==
Manuel Anemas was a member of the Anemas family. Four Anemas brothers were involved in a serious conspiracy against Alexios I Komnenos in 1105. It is remarkable that in the next generation a member of the same family, Manuel, married the porphyrogenita princess Theodora Komnene, daughter of John II and his empress, Eirene of Hungary. By this marriage John II may have been seeking to politically neutralise the threat of a potentially dangerous family. He was certainly pursuing a policy of bringing 'new blood' into the imperial family and governing circles.

Manuel was celebrated by the Byzantine court poet Theodore Prodromos, who described him as a wise general and the "great tower of the Rhomaioi", Rhomaioi being the Romans, as the Byzantines referred to themselves. Though Anemas appears to have been a prominent soldier little information on his exploits has survived.

Manuel Anemas died in 1148; a funerary lament dated to Holy Week of that year by Prodromos, for "'Kyrios Manuel Anemas, the most fortunate son-in-law of the late basileus and autokrator of the Romans John the Purple-born", is extant.

== Family ==
Manuel Anemas and Theodora Komnene had a number of children:

- Alexios Komnenos (c. 1131 or c. 1133/35 – 1155/57), married Anna Komnene Doukaina, a great-grandniece of Alexios I (possibly a granddaughter of Alexios' brother Isaac Komnenos). He died of some disease, possibly tuberculosis, and died at a young age; his wife followed soon after. The couple had one child, of whom nothing further is known.
- A daughter, possibly named Irene (born c. 1132), she married an unknown husband, and had at least one daughter, Theodora, the wife of Andronikos Lapardas.
- A daughter, possibly named Maria (born c. 1133), she married John Angelos, a nephew of Constantine Angelos and distinguished military commander. The marriage remained childless.
- Eudokia (born c. 1142), she married the scholar Theodore Styppeiotes, who became Manuel I's chief minister. The couple had several children, but only the name of one, Manuel, is known.

== Bibliography ==
- Kazhdan, Alexander, ed. (1991). The Oxford Dictionary of Byzantium. Oxford and New York: Oxford University Press. ISBN 0-19-504652-8.
- Kazhdan, A.P. and Epstein A.W. (1990) Change in Byzantine Culture in the Eleventh and Twelfth Centuries, University of California Press
- Magdalino, Paul (2002) [1993]. The Empire of Manuel I Komnenos, 1143–1180 (Second ed.). Cambridge: Cambridge University Press. ISBN 9780521526531.
- Varzos, Konstantinos (1984). Η Γενεαλογία των Κομνηνών [The Genealogy of the Komnenoi] (PDF) (in Greek). Vol. A1. Thessaloniki: Centre for Byzantine Studies, University of Thessaloniki.
- Varzos, Konstantinos (1984). Η Γενεαλογία των Κομνηνών [The Genealogy of the Komnenoi] (PDF) (in Greek). Vol. B. Thessaloniki: Centre for Byzantine Studies, University of Thessaloniki.
