= Katta Shekar Reddy =

Indian journalist and editor

Katta Shekhar Reddy
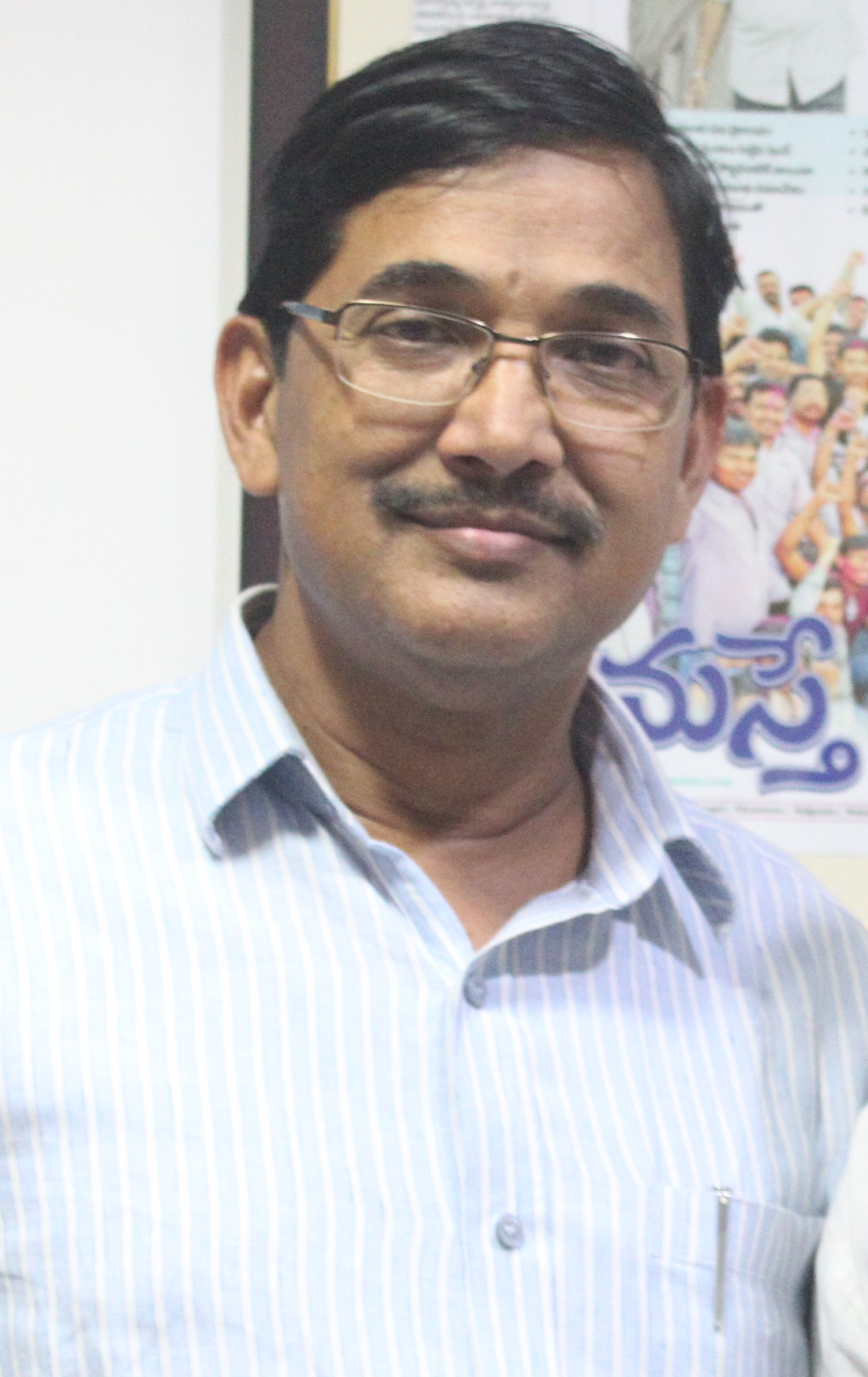
- Born: 5 December; Madgulapally, Nalgonda, Telangana, India
- Occupation(s): Journalist, columnist

Katta Shekar Reddy is an Indian journalist and editor of the Telugu newspaper Namasthe Telangana, having served in that capacity since June 2014. Reddy earlier worked with Udayam, Andhra Jyothi and Vaartha Telugu newspapers.

He also worked as Executive Editor at Mahaa TV. He joined Namasthe Telangana as its CEO in September 2010.
