= Katha (moth) =

Scientific classification
- Domain: Eukaryota
- Kingdom: Animalia
- Phylum: Arthropoda
- Class: Insecta
- Order: Lepidoptera
- Superfamily: Noctuoidea
- Family: Erebidae
- Subfamily: Arctiinae
- Subtribe: Lithosiina
- Genus: Katha; Moore, 1878

Genus of moths

Katha is a genus of tiger moths in the family Erebidae. The genus was erected by Moore in 1878.

Most species were previously placed in the genus Eilema.

== Species ==
- Katha conformis (Walker, 1854)
- Katha deplana (Esper, 1787)
- Katha laevis (Butler, 1877)
- Katha magnata (Matsumura, 1927)
- Katha moorei Leech, 1890
- Katha nankunshanica Dubatolov, Kishida & M. Wang, 2012
- Katha nigropoda (Bremer & Grey, 1852)
- Katha prabana (Moore, 1859)
- Katha rungsi (Toulgoët, 1960)
- Katha suffusa (Leech, 1899)
