= Kata Kálmán =

Hungarian photographer

Kata Kálmán (25 April 1909 – 31 March 1978) was a Hungarian portrait and social documentary photographer. She was born in Korpona (now Krupina, Slovakia) and died in Budapest.

In 2012 her book A Csibe-ügy. Egy fotográfus naplója Móricz Zsigmond utolsó éveiről (English: The Csibe Case. A Photographer's Diary on the Last Years of Zsigmond Móricz) was published posthumously.

Her work is included in the Museum of Fine Arts Houston, the Art Institute of Chicago, the Hungarian Museum of Photography, Kecskemét, and the Hungarian National Museum.
