= John II Komnenos =

Byzantine emperor from 1118 to 1143

- Emperor and Autocrat of the Romans
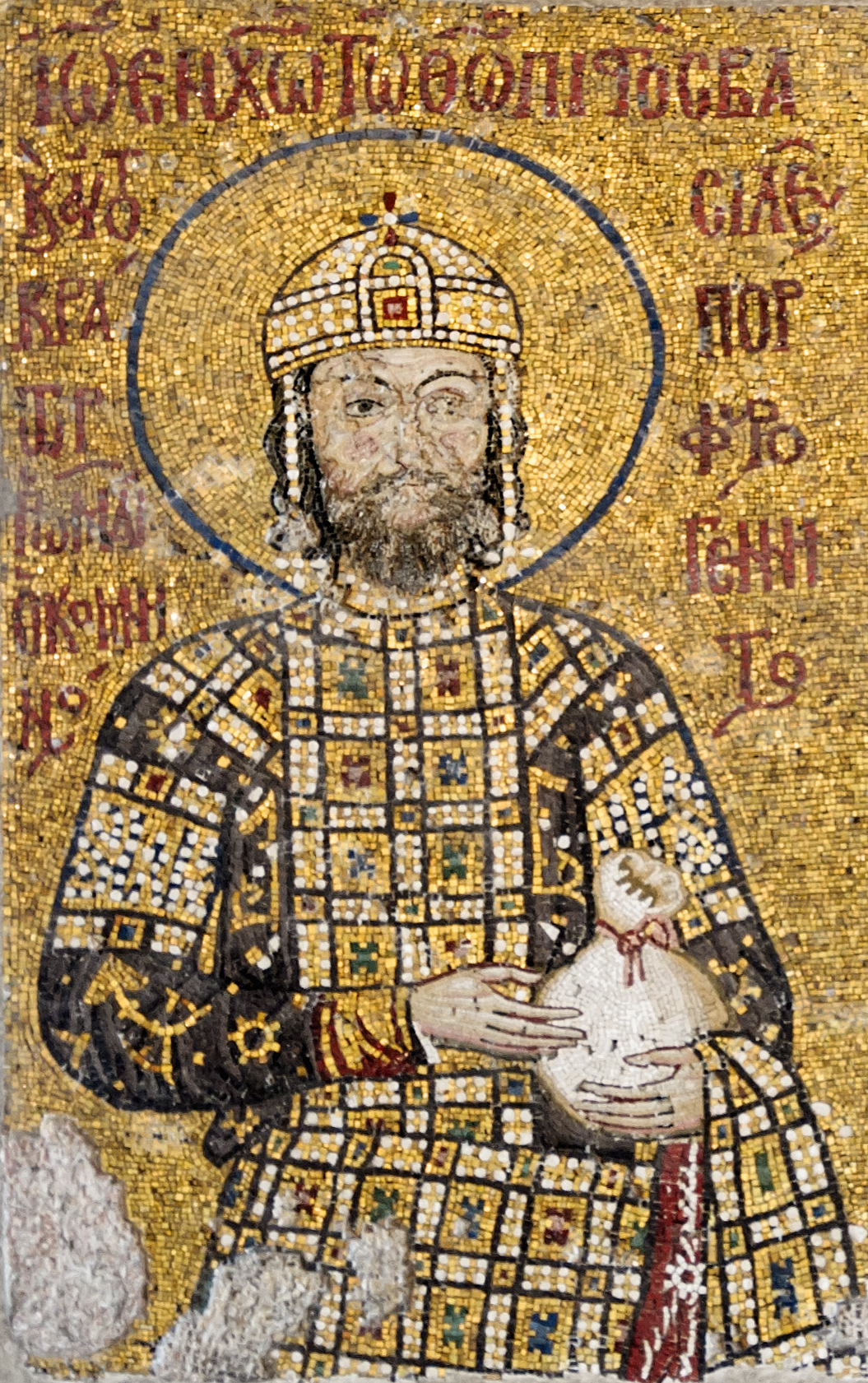
- Mosaic of John II at the Hagia Sophia

Byzantine emperor
- Reign: 15 August 1118 – 8 April 1143
- Coronation: 1092 as co-emperor
- Predecessor: Alexios I Komnenos
- Successor: Manuel I Komnenos
- Co-emperor: Alexios the Younger
- Born: 13 September 1087; Constantinople, Byzantine Empire (now Istanbul, Turkey)
- Died: 8 April 1143 (aged 55); Cilicia, Byzantine Empire (now Mediterranean Region, Anatolia, Turkey)
- Burial: Monastery of Christ Pantocrator, Constantinople (now Zeyrek Mosque, Istanbul)
- Spouse: Irene of Hungary
- Issue more...: Alexios the Younger; Andronikos Komnenos; Isaac Komnenos; Manuel I Komnenos
Names
- John Komnenos; Ιωάννης Κομνηνός
- Dynasty: Komnenian
- Father: Alexios I Komnenos
- Mother: Irene Doukaina
- Religion: Eastern Orthodox
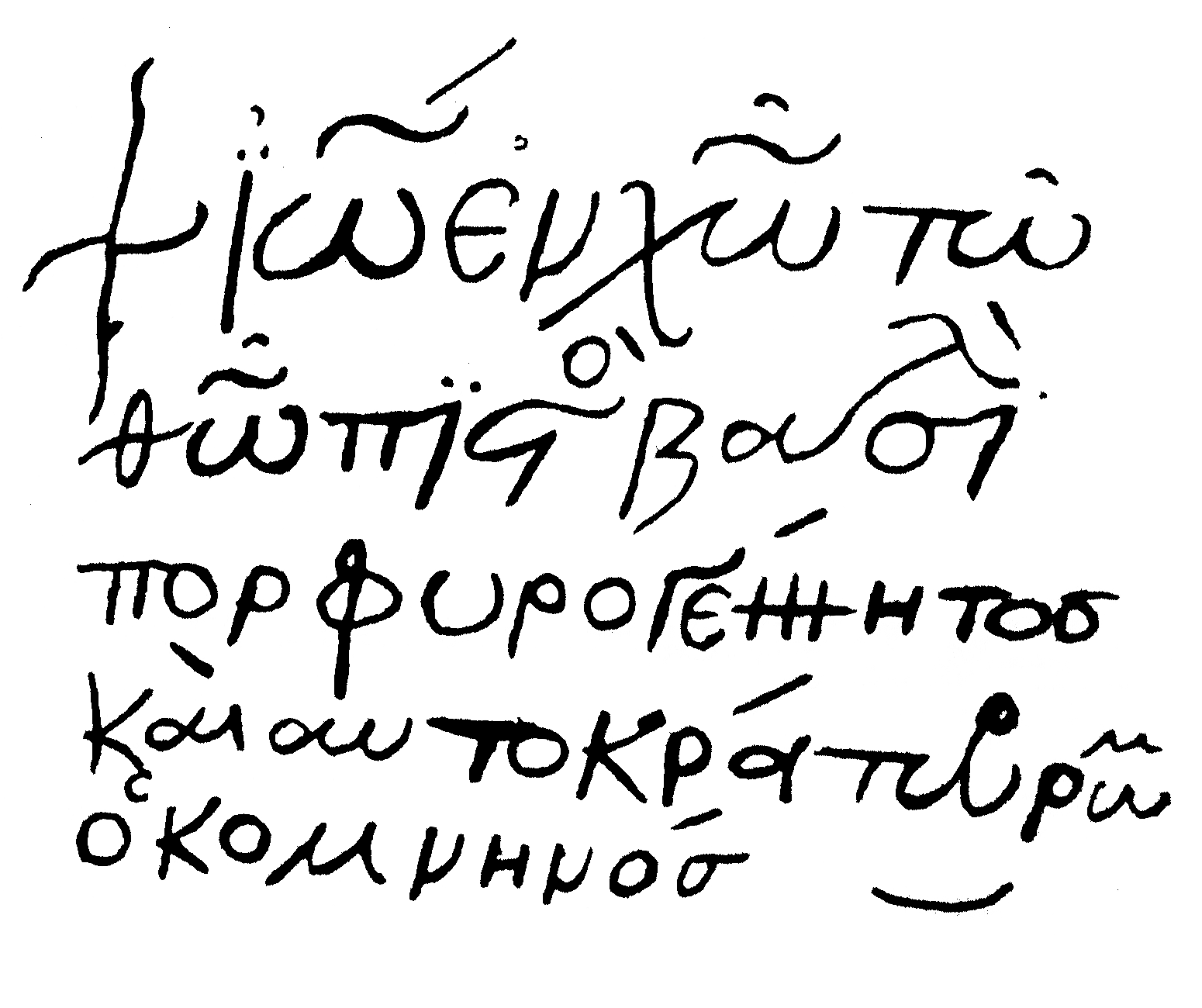
- Signature

John II Komnenos or Comnenus (Greek: Ἱωάννης Κομνηνός, romanized: Iōánnēs Komnēnós; 13 September 1087 – 8 April 1143) was Byzantine emperor from 1118 to 1143. Also known as "John the Beautiful" or "John the Good" (Greek: Καλοϊωάννης, romanized: Kaloïōánnēs), he was the eldest son of Emperor Alexios I Komnenos and Irene Doukaina and the second emperor to rule during the Komnenian restoration of the Byzantine Empire. As he was born to a reigning emperor, he had the status of a porphyrogennetos. John was a pious and dedicated monarch who was determined to undo the damage his empire had suffered following the Battle of Manzikert, half a century earlier.

John has been assessed as the greatest of the Komnenian emperors. This view became entrenched due to its espousal by George Ostrogorsky in his influential book History of the Byzantine State, where John is described as a ruler who, "... combined clever prudence with purposeful energy ... and [was] high principled beyond his day." In the course of the quarter-century of his reign, John made alliances with the Holy Roman Empire in the west, decisively defeated the Pechenegs, Hungarians and Serbs in the Balkans, and personally led numerous campaigns against the Turks in Asia Minor. John's campaigns fundamentally changed the balance of power in the east, forcing the Turks onto the defensive; they also led to the recapture of many towns, fortresses and cities across the Anatolian peninsula. In the southeast, John extended Byzantine control from the Maeander in the west all the way to Cilicia and Tarsus in the east. In an effort to demonstrate the Byzantine ideal of the emperor's role as the leader of the Christian world, John marched into Muslim Syria at the head of the combined forces of Byzantium and the Crusader states; yet despite the great vigour with which he pressed the campaign, John's hopes were disappointed by the evasiveness of his Crusader allies and their reluctance to fight alongside his forces.

Under John, the empire's population recovered to about 10 million people. The quarter-century of John II's reign is less well recorded by contemporary or near-contemporary writers than the reigns of either his father, Alexios I, or his son, Manuel I. In particular little is known of the history of John's domestic rule or policies. (Note: Alexios I was the subject of an extensive biography, the Alexiad, written by his daughter Anna Komnene, who mentions her brother, John II, very briefly. The works of Byzantine historians John Kinnamos and Niketas Choniates both include very short chapters on the reign of John II, which act as prologues, before proceeding to much fuller accounts of later events, see Birkenmeier, pp. 2, 5–6, 15, 19.)

== Physical appearance and character ==
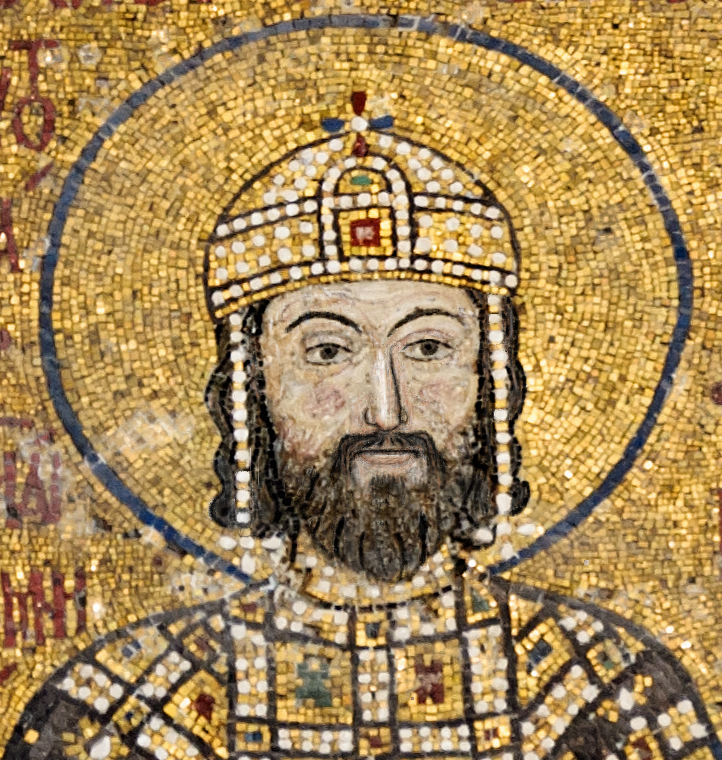
John II Komnenos – a conjectural digital replacement of facial features damaged on the original mosaic in Hagia Sophia

The Latin historian William of Tyre described John as short and unusually ugly, with eyes, hair and complexion so dark he was known as 'the Moor'. Yet despite his physical appearance, John was known as Kaloïōannēs, "John the Good" or "John the Beautiful"; the epithet referred to his character. Both his parents were unusually pious and John surpassed them. Members of his court were expected to restrict their conversation to serious subjects only. The food served at the emperor's table was very frugal and John lectured courtiers who lived in excessive luxury. His speech was dignified, but he engaged in repartee on occasion. All accounts agree that he was a faithful husband to his wife, an unusual trait in a medieval ruler. Despite his personal austerity, John had a high conception of the imperial role and would appear in full ceremonial splendour when this was advantageous.

John was famed for his piety and his remarkably mild and just reign. He is considered an exceptional example of a moral ruler, at a time when cruelty was the norm. He is reputed never to have condemned anyone to death or mutilation. Charity was dispensed lavishly. For this reason, he has been called the Byzantine Marcus Aurelius. By the example of his personal morality and piety he effected a notable improvement in the manners of his age. Descriptions of him and his actions indicate that he had great self-control and personal courage, and was an excellent strategist and general.

== Early life ==
John was born on 13 September 1087, the third child and first son of Emperor Alexios I Komnenos and his wife Irene Doukaina. Joannes Zonaras describes John's birth, "And then a son was born to the emperor, who was honoured with the holy baptism in the holy church of Hagia Sophia by the Patriarch. He was named John and his father then crowned him with a diadem". At a young age he was associated with his father as co-emperor, sometime between 1 September and early November, 1092. The first act in the name of both emperors was issued on 15 November 1092. The occasion of John's elevation was celebrated by a special issue of coins with his parents depicted on the reverse and John crowned by Christ on the obverse.

Alexios I arranged a dynastic marriage for John. In 1104 or early 1105 John was married to the Hungarian princess Piroska, daughter of King Ladislaus I of Hungary. She was given the Greek name Irene, meaning 'peace', in Byzantium. This marriage sealed a political alliance, which would strengthen Byzantium's position in the Balkans and Adriatic. In 1106 Alexios I was campaigning against the Serbs, most probably accompanied by his son John. At this time John's wife was heavily pregnant, she was with her husband on campaign, giving birth to twins, Alexios and Maria, in Balabista, Macedonia. The question arises as to why the birth was not in Constantinople. It is reasonably supposed that John did not wish to leave his unsupported wife under the control of his mother, who would have had authority in Constantinople in the absence of both emperors. In 1108, the Treaty of Devol recorded the submission of the defeated Bohemond I of Antioch to " ... the great Emperor Kyr[ios] Alexios Komnenos and of your thrice-loved son, Emperor Kyr John born in the purple". This leaves no doubt as to John's status as co-emperor and heir apparent.

== Accession to the throne ==
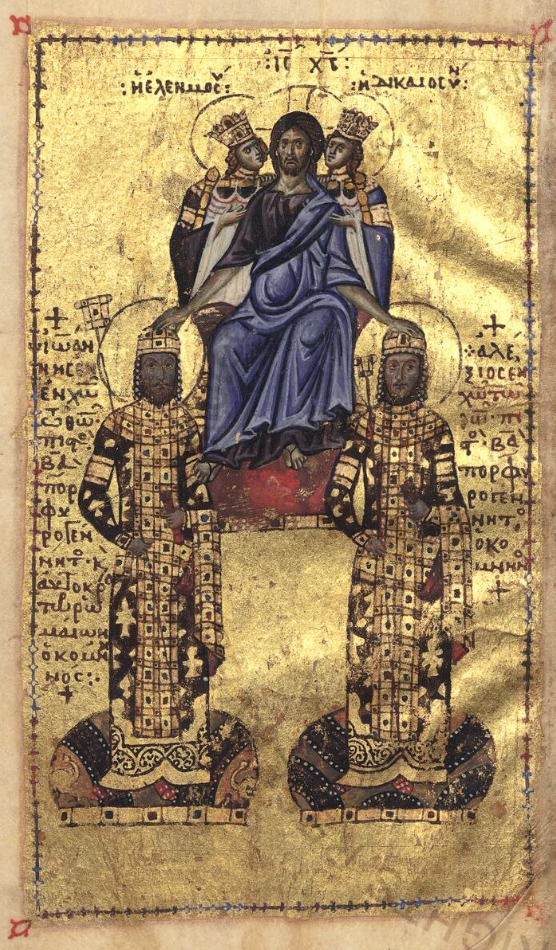
John II (left) and his eldest son Alexios, crowned by Christ. Minuscule 157, early 12th century

John II succeeded his father as ruling basileus in 1118. Despite his earlier coronation as co-emperor, the accession of John was contested. That Alexios I favoured John to succeed him is made obvious by the elevation of his son to the position of co-emperor. However, Alexios' influential wife, Irene, favoured the Caesar Nikephoros Bryennios, the husband of her eldest child Anna Komnene. Anna, who in infancy had been betrothed to her father's first co-emperor Constantine Doukas, herself harboured obvious aspirations to power and the throne. During Alexios' final illness both wife and daughter exploited his physical weakness to apply pressure on him in support of their agenda for the succession. Alexios endured these constant demands without formally changing his intended successor. As Alexios lay dying in the monastery of the Mangana on 15 August 1118, John, relying on trusted relatives, especially his brother Isaac Komnenos, gained entry into the monastery and obtained the imperial signet ring from his father. He then assembled his armed followers and rode to the Great Palace, gathering the support of the citizenry on the way. The palace guard at first refused to admit John without clear proof of his father's wishes, however, the mob surrounding the new emperor simply forced an entry. In the palace John was acclaimed emperor. Irene, taken by surprise, was unable either to persuade her son to step down, or to induce Nikephoros to contend for the throne. In a recent biography of Anna, however, this account of events has been disputed, in particular the involvement of John's sister in any palace coup attempt during the days around Alexios' death, has been questioned. The weight of historical opinion remains that Anna tried at least twice to usurp her brother's throne, resulting in her eventual perennial 'house arrest'. Anna later complained that John and his successor, her nephew Emperor Manuel, kept her isolated from society for 30 years.

Alexios died the night following his son's decisive move to take power. John refused to attend his father's funeral, despite the pleas of his mother, because he feared a counter-coup. However, in the space of a few days, his position seemed secure. Within a year of his accession, however, John II uncovered a conspiracy to overthrow him which implicated his mother and sister. Anna's husband Nikephoros had little sympathy with her ambitions, and it was his lack of support which doomed the conspiracy. Anna was stripped of her property, which was offered to the emperor's friend John Axouch. Axouch wisely declined and his influence ensured that Anna's property was eventually returned to her and that John II and his sister became reconciled, at least to a degree. Irene retired to a monastery and Anna seems to have been effectively removed from public life, taking up the less active occupation of historian. However, Nikephoros remained on good terms with his brother-in-law. One of the very few records of John's own words concerns the plot against him; he says that after ascending the throne, God "destroyed the cunning plots of my visible and invisible enemies and rescued me from every trap subjecting all my enemies under my feet". To safeguard his own succession, John crowned his young son Alexios as co-emperor around September 1119. (Note: The coronation of Alexios as co-emperor is usually dated to 1122, but contemporary documents indicate that he was crowned between 12 July and 7 October 1119.)

== Military and civil administration ==
The family intrigues that challenged his succession to the throne probably contributed to John's approach to rulership, which was to appoint men from outside the imperial family to high office. This was a radical departure from the methods of his father, who had used the imperial family and its many connections to fill almost all senior administrative and military posts.

John Axouch was John II's closest adviser and was his only intimate friend. Axouch was a Turk captured as a child at the Siege of Nicaea, who had been given as a gift to John's father. Emperor Alexios had thought him a good companion for his son, and so he had been brought up alongside the prince in the imperial household. Axouch was immediately appointed Grand Domestic (in Greek: μέγας δομέστικος, megas domestikos), upon the accession of John II. The Grand Domestic was the commander in chief of the Byzantine armies. It has been suggested that references to Axouch's possession of the imperial seal early in the reign of John's successor Manuel I meant that he was, in addition to his military duties, the head of the civil administration of the Empire. This was an unofficial position known at the time as the mesazon, and equivalent to a vizier or 'prime-minister.' Such an appointment was remarkable, and a radical departure from the nepotism that had characterised the reign of Alexios I. The imperial family harboured some degree of resentment at this decision, which was reinforced by the fact that they were required to make obeisance to John Axouch whenever they met him.

John's unwillingness to allow his family to influence his government to any great extent was to remain constant for the rest of his reign. John appointed a number of his father's former officials to senior administrative posts, men such as Eustathios Kamytzes, Michaelitzes Styppeiotes and George Dekanos. These were men who had been politically eclipsed during the ascendancy exercised by John's mother in the later years of the reign of Alexios I. A number of 'new men' were raised to prominence by John II, these included Gregory Taronites who was appointed protovestiarios, Manuel Anemas and Theodore Vatatzes, the latter two also became his sons-in-law. John's marriage policy, of bringing new families into the imperial orbit, may have been directed towards lessening the influence of certain prominent aristocratic clans, such as the Doukas, Diogenes and Melissenos families, some of which had produced emperors themselves in the past.

Despite his move away from close reliance on the imperial family and its connections, John's court and government had many similarities to that of his father, not least in its serious tone and piety. Indeed, an extant collection of political advice couched in poetic form, called the Mousai, are attributed to Alexios I. The Mousai are addressed directly to John II and exhort him, amongst other things, to maintain justice during his reign and a full treasury. Alexios' advice on rulership therefore continued to be available to his son, even after the old emperor's death.

The increase in military security and economic stability within Byzantine western Anatolia created by John II's campaigns allowed him to begin the establishment of a formal provincial system in these regions. The theme (province) of Thrakesion was re-established, with its administrative centre at Philadelphia. A new theme, named Mylasa and Melanoudion, was created to the south of Thrakesion.

== Conspiracies of the sebastokrator Isaac ==
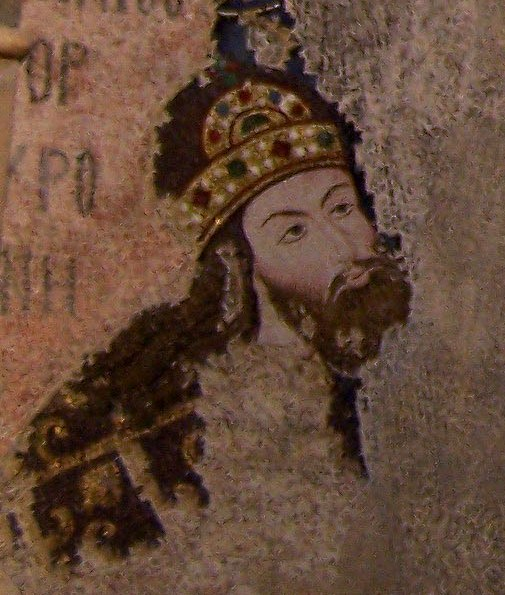
Isaac Komnenos, mosaic of from the Chora Church

The younger brother of John II, Isaac, had been of essential support during the accession crisis. However, despite being given the highest of court titles, that of sebastokrator, Isaac later became estranged from his brother and became an active conspirator. With trusted advisors of his own choosing, such as John Axouch, and later the support of his son and co-emperor, Alexios, John II offered no meaningful role to Isaac in the governance of the empire. In the reign of Alexios I sebastokratores had wielded considerable power and Isaac would have had an expectation of a similar level of authority being devolved on himself. This thwarted ambition is probably what disillusioned Isaac with his brother's rule. Isaac aimed at replacing his brother as emperor. In 1130 John became aware of a plot involving Isaac and other magnates as he was leaving to campaign against the Turks. When John tried to seize Isaac, the latter escaped and fled to the Danishmend emir Ghazi, who received him, and later sent him to the breakaway Byzantine regime of the Gabrades in Trebizond. Isaac then became the guest of Masoud, the Seljuk Sultan of Rum, and subsequently of Leo, the Prince of Cilician Armenia. That Isaac was seeking aid from these princes in a bid to take the Byzantine throne by force is highly likely. Such a coalition did not materialise, but Isaac seems to have retained strong support in Constantinople. In 1132 John had to return from campaign in haste, when news reached him that conspirators in Constantinople had made an appeal to Isaac to become their ruler. The triumph that John celebrated following his capture of Kastamuni in 1133 can be seen as being a public affirmation of John's legitimacy as emperor embodied in the celebration of the defeat of external foes. The brothers were briefly reconciled in 1138, and Isaac returned to Constantinople; however, a year later Isaac was exiled to Heraclea Pontica, where he remained for the rest of John's life. In the extensive artwork that Isaac commissioned, he made much of his porphyrogenete status and his relationship with his imperial father, Alexios I, but he made little or no reference to his relationship to his brother John, or to the title of sebastokrator that he had received from him.

== Diplomacy ==
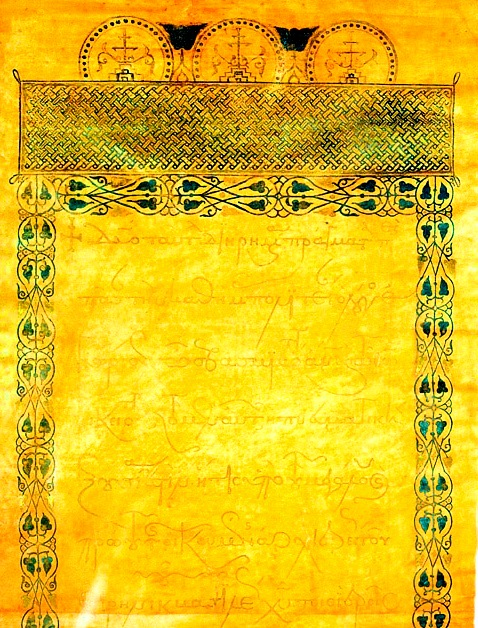
A letter from John II to Pope Innocent II

The central tenet of the foreign policy of John II in the West was to maintain an alliance with the German emperors (Holy Roman Empire). This was necessary to limit the threat posed by the Normans of southern Italy to Byzantine territory in the Balkans. This threat became especially acute after Roger II of Sicily made himself supreme in southern Italy and assumed the title of king. Emperor Lothair III had Byzantine backing, including a large financial subsidy, for his invasion of Norman territory in 1136, which reached as far south as Bari. Pope Innocent II, with the Church's possessions in Italy under threat by Roger II, who supported Antipope Anacletus II, was also party to the alliance of Lothair and John II. However, this alliance proved unable to resist Roger, who extracted by force a recognition of his royal title from the Pope in 1139 (Treaty of Mignano). Lothair's successor Conrad III was approached in 1140 for a royal German bride for John's youngest son Manuel. Bertha of Sulzbach, Conrad's sister-in-law, was chosen and despatched to Byzantium. At much the same time Roger II applied to John II for an imperial bride for his son, but was unsuccessful.

John's penchant for interfering with his wife's family, the rulers of Hungary, was problematic. The welcome accorded to ousted claimants of the Hungarian throne in Constantinople was seen by the Byzantines as a useful insurance policy and source of political leverage. However, the Hungarians treated this interference as a fighting matter. A Hungarian alliance with the Serbs produced serious consequences for continued Byzantine dominance in the western Balkans.

In the East John attempted, like his father, to exploit the differences between the Seljuq Sultan of Iconium and the Danishmendid dynasty controlling the northeastern, inland, parts of Anatolia. In 1134 the Seljuq sultan Masoud provided troops for John's attack on the Danishmend-held city of Kastamuni (reoccupied immediately after the Byzantine conquest of 1133), however, the alliance proved unreliable as the Seljuq troops abandoned the expedition, decamping during the night.

In the Crusader states of the Levant it was generally admitted that the Byzantine claims over Antioch were legally valid, though it was pragmatically viewed that only when the Byzantine emperor was in a position to enforce them militarily were they likely to be recognised in practice. The high point of John's diplomacy in the Levant was in 1137 when he extracted formal homage from the rulers of the Principality of Antioch, County of Edessa and the County of Tripoli. The Byzantine desire to be seen as holding a level of suzerainty over all of the Crusader states was taken seriously, as evidenced by the alarm shown in the Kingdom of Jerusalem when John informed King Fulk of his plan for an armed pilgrimage to the Holy City (1142).

== Religious matters ==
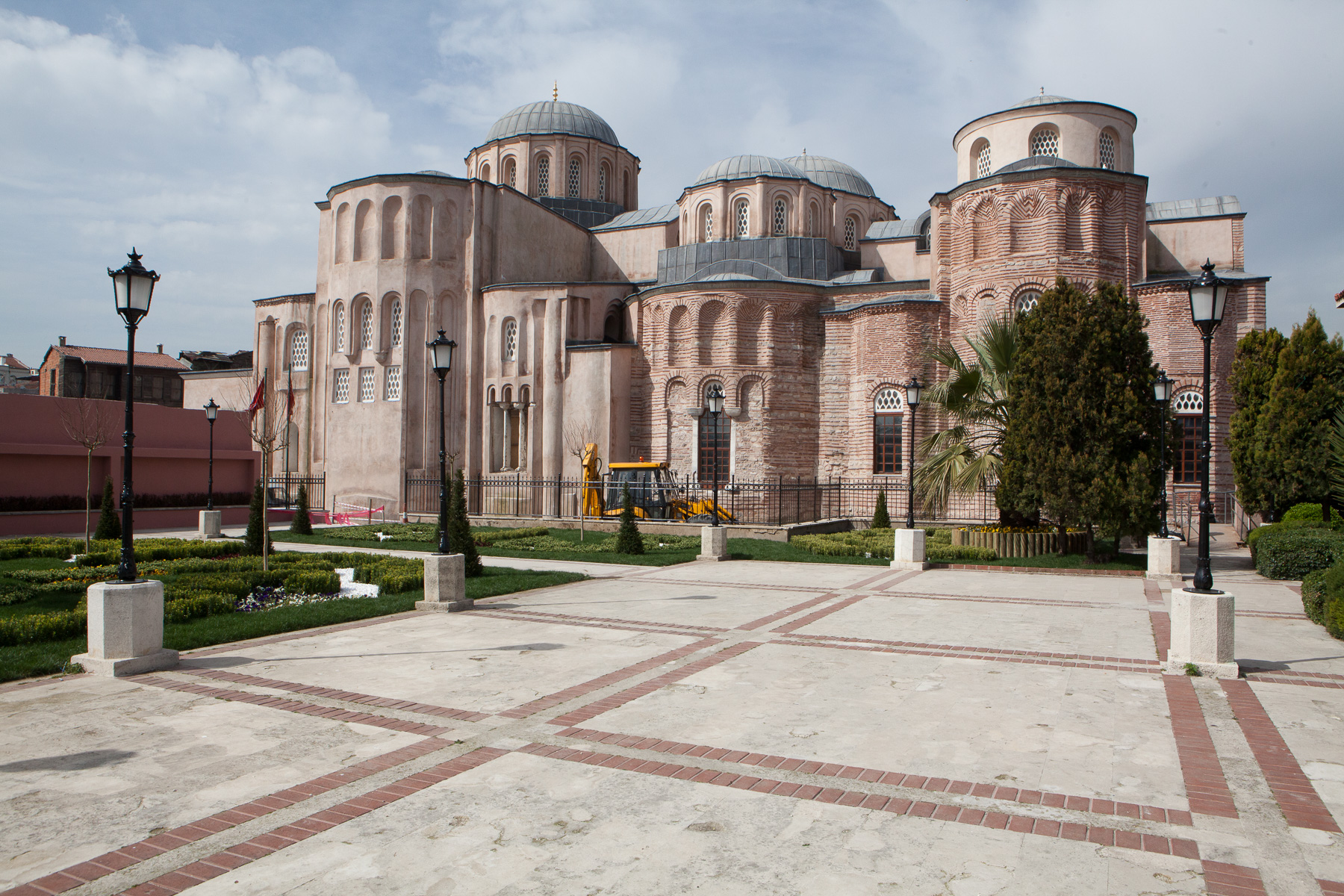
Former Imperial Chapels of Christ Pantokrator, now the Zeyrek Mosque, Istanbul. The tomb of John II was in the central church.

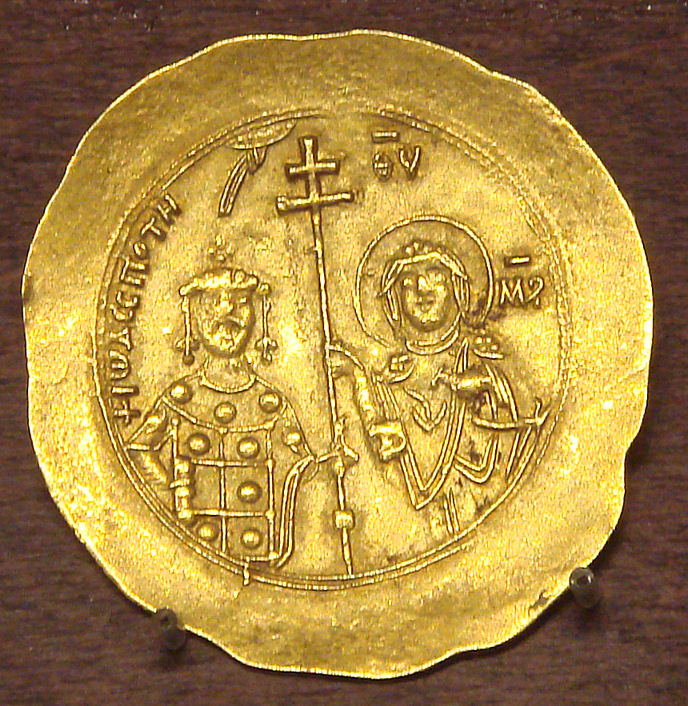
Gold coin of John II Komnenos, depicting the Virgin Mary and John holding a cross.

The reign of John II was taken up with almost constant warfare and, unlike his father who delighted in active participation in theological and doctrinal disputes, John appears to have been content to leave ecclesiastical matters to the Ecumenical Patriarch of Constantinople and the church hierarchy. Only when religion impinged directly on imperial policy, as in relations with the papacy and the possible union of the Greek and Latin churches, did John take an active part. He organised a number of disputations between Greek and Latin theologians.

John, alongside his wife who shared in his religious and charitable works, is known to have undertaken church building on a considerable scale, including construction of the Monastery of Christ Pantokrator (Zeyrek Mosque) in Constantinople. This monastery, with its three churches, has been described as one of the most important and influential architectural constructions of Middle Byzantine Constantinople. Attached to the monastery was a hospital, of 5 wards, open to people of all social classes. The hospital was staffed by trained layman doctors rather than monks. The central of the three churches was the Komnenian funerary chapel, dedicated to St. Michael. It had twin domes, and is described in the typikon of the monastery as being in the form of a heroon; this emulates the older mausolea of Constantine and Justinian in the Church of the Holy Apostles.

Very active persecution of the followers of the Paulician and Bogomil heresies characterised the last few years of the reign of Alexios I. No records from the reign of John mention such persecution, though countermeasures against heresy by the Byzantine Church remained in force. A permanent synod in Constantinople investigated the writings of a deceased monk named Constantine Chrysomallos which had been circulating in certain monasteries. These works were ordered to be burnt by the Patriarch of Constantinople, Leo Styppes, in May 1140, on the grounds that they incorporated elements of Bogomil belief and practices.

One of the few members of the imperial family to be placed in an important position by John was his cousin, Adrian Komnenos (son of John's uncle the sebastokrator Isaac). Adrian had become a monk, adopting the monastic name John, and had accompanied the emperor on his campaigns of 1138. Soon afterwards, Adrian was appointed Archbishop of Bulgaria as John IV of Ohrid. Bulgaria was an autocephalous see and required a prestigious man as archbishop.

== Military exploits ==
Though he fought a number of notable pitched battles, the military strategy of John II relied on taking and holding fortified settlements in order to construct defensible frontiers. John personally conducted approximately twenty five sieges during his reign.

=== The Pechenegs destroyed (1122) ===
In 1119–1121 John defeated the Seljuq Turks, establishing his control over southwestern Anatolia. However, immediately afterwards, in 1122, John quickly transferred his troops to Europe to counter a Pecheneg invasion across the Danube frontier into Paristrion. These invaders had been auxiliaries of Vladimir Monomakh, the Prince of Kiev. John surrounded the Pechenegs as they burst into Thrace, tricked them into believing that he would grant them a favourable treaty, and then launched a devastating surprise attack upon their fortified camp. The ensuing Battle of Beroia was hard-fought, John was wounded in the leg by an arrow, but by the end of the day the Byzantine army had won a crushing victory. The decisive moment of the battle was when John led the Varangian Guard, largely composed of Englishmen, to assault defensive Pecheneg wagon laager, employing their famous axes to hack their way in. The battle put an effective end to the Pechenegs as an independent people; many of the captives taken in the conflict were settled as soldier-farmers within the Byzantine frontier.

=== Conflict with Venice (1124–1126) ===
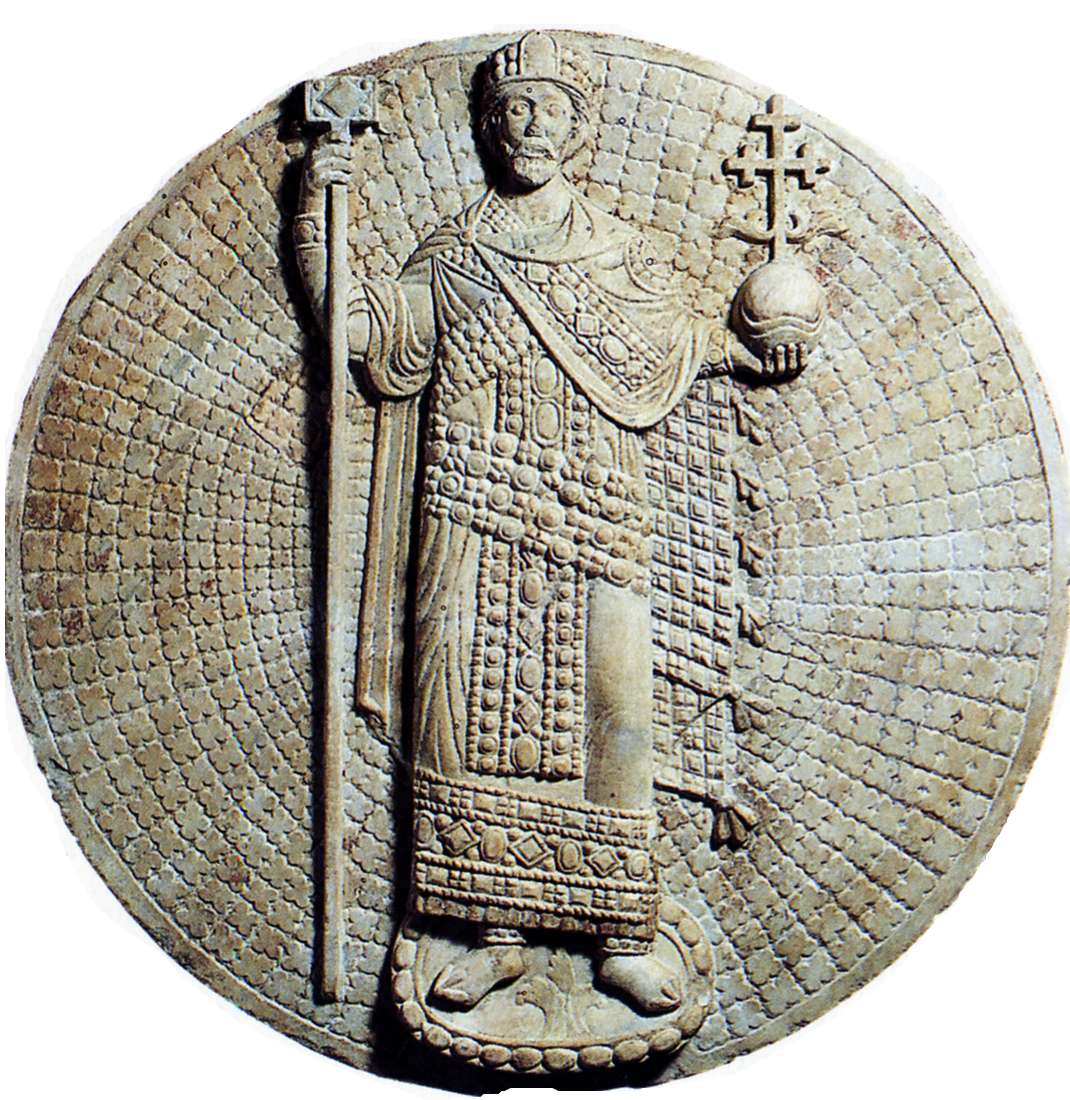
John II in full imperial regalia, Byzantine low relief sculpture in marble, early 12th century.

After his accession, John II had refused to confirm his father's 1082 treaty with the Republic of Venice, which had given the Italian republic unique and generous trading rights within the Byzantine Empire. Yet the change in policy was not motivated by financial concerns. An incident involving the abuse of a member of the imperial family by Venetians led to a dangerous conflict, especially as Byzantium had depended on Venice for its naval strength. After a Byzantine retaliatory attack on Kerkyra, John exiled the Venetian merchants from Constantinople. But this produced further retaliation, and a Venetian fleet of 72 ships plundered Rhodes, Chios, Samos, Lesbos, Andros and captured Kefalonia in the Ionian Sea. Eventually John was forced to come to terms; the war was costing him more than it was worth, and he was not prepared to transfer funds from the imperial land forces to the navy for the construction of new ships. John re-confirmed the treaty of 1082, in August 1126.

=== War with the Hungarians and Serbs (1127–1129 – chronology uncertain) ===
John's marriage to the Hungarian princess Piroska involved him in the dynastic struggles of the Kingdom of Hungary. In giving asylum to Álmos, a blinded claimant to the Hungarian throne, John aroused the suspicion of the Hungarians. The Hungarians, led by Stephen II, then invaded Byzantium's Balkan provinces in 1127, with hostilities lasting until 1129; however, an alternative chronology has been suggested with the Hungarian attack and Byzantine retaliation taking place in 1125 with a renewal of hostilities in 1126. (Note: The primary sources, Kinnamos and Choniates, give little detail about this campaign, no dates are specified, and what they do say differs considerably. The chronology presented here, 1127–1129, follows that of Angold and other scholars, Fine has the events taking place earlier, in 1125–1126.) John launched a punitive raid against the Serbs, who had dangerously aligned themselves with Hungary, many of whom were rounded up and transported to Nicomedia in Asia Minor to serve as military colonists. This was done partly to cow the Serbs into submission (Serbia was, at least nominally, a Byzantine protectorate), and partly to strengthen the Byzantine frontier in the east against the Turks. The Serbs were forced to acknowledge Byzantine suzerainty once again. The Serbian campaign may have taken place between two distinct phases in the war against Hungary. The Hungarians attacked Belgrade, Nish and Sofia; John, who was near Philippopolis in Thrace, counterattacked, supported by a naval flotilla operating on the Danube. After a challenging campaign, the details of which are obscure, the emperor managed to defeat the Hungarians and their Serbian allies at the fortress of Haram or Chramon, which is the modern Nova Palanka; many Hungarian troops were killed when a bridge they were crossing collapsed as they were fleeing from a Byzantine attack. Following this the Hungarians renewed hostilities by attacking Braničevo, which was immediately rebuilt by John. Further Byzantine military successes, Choniates mentions several engagements, resulted in a restoration of peace. The Byzantines were confirmed in their control of Braničevo, Belgrade and Zemun and they also recovered the region of Sirmium (called Frangochorion in Choniates), which had been Hungarian since the 1060s. The Hungarian pretender Álmos died in 1129, removing the major source of friction.

=== War of attrition against the Anatolian Turks (1119–20, 1130–35, 1139–40) ===
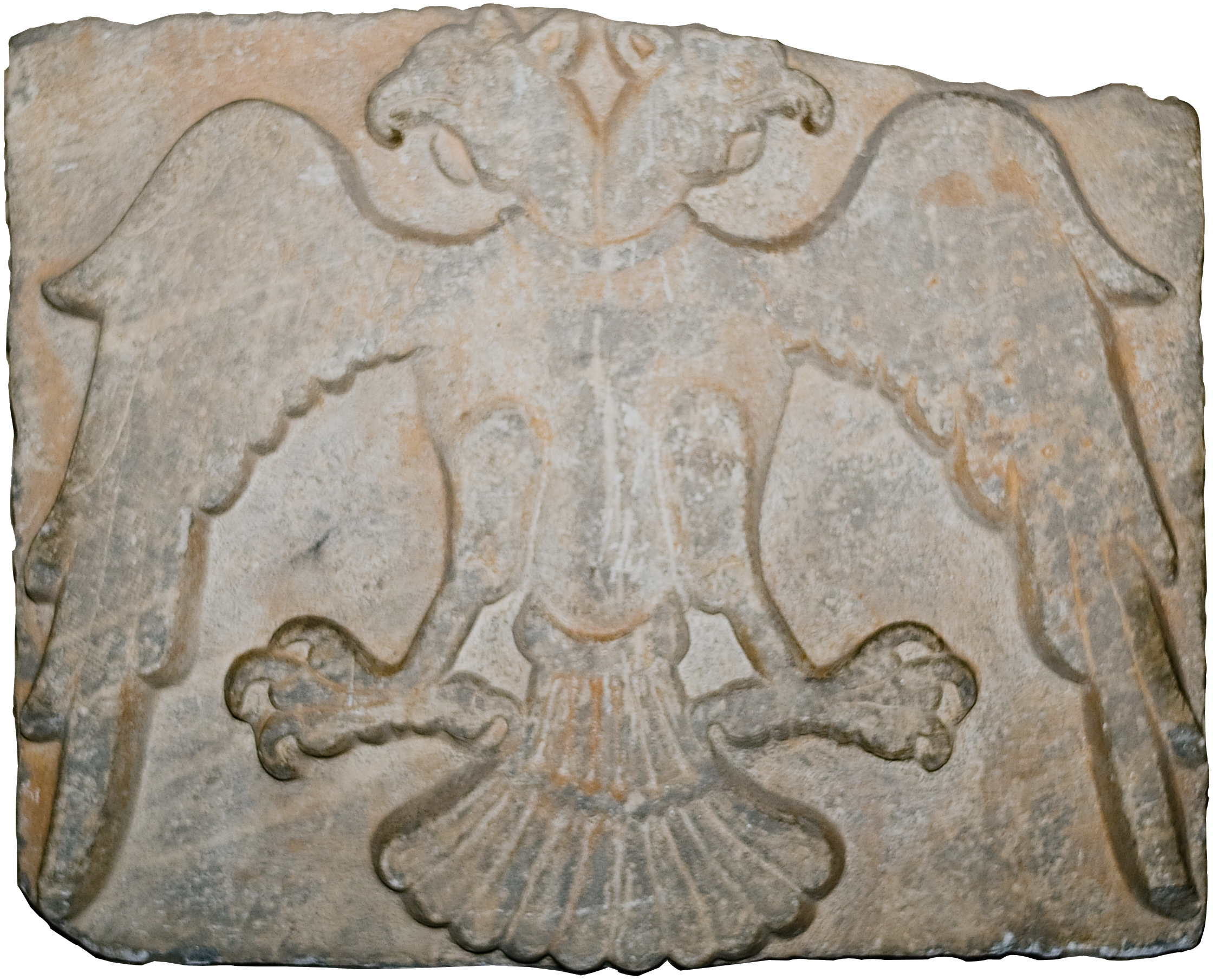
Seljuq period architectural fragment from Konya, showing Seljuq appropriation of the double-headed eagle often associated with Byzantium. Ince Minare Museum, Konya. The naturalism of the sculpture looks more Greek than Syrian or Iranian in workmanship.

Early in John's reign the Turks were pressing forward against the Byzantine frontier in western Asia Minor. In 1119, the Seljuqs had cut the land route to the city of Attaleia on the southern coast of Anatolia. John II and Axouch the Grand Domestic besieged and recaptured Laodicea in 1119 and took Sozopolis by storm in 1120, re-opening land communication with Attaleia. This route was especially important as it also led to Cilicia and the Crusader states of Syria.

Following the end of hostilities with Hungary, John was able to concentrate on Asia Minor during most of his remaining years. He undertook annual campaigns against the Danishmendid emirate in Malatya (Melitene) on the upper Euphrates from 1130 to 1135. Thanks to his energetic campaigning, Turkish attempts at expansion in Asia Minor were halted, and John prepared to take the fight to the enemy. In order to restore the region to Byzantine control, he led a series of well planned and executed campaigns against the Turks, one of which resulted in the reconquest of the ancestral home of the Komnenoi at Kastamonu (Kastra Komnenon); he then left a garrison of 2,000 men at Gangra. John quickly earned a formidable reputation as a wall-breaker, taking one stronghold after another from his enemies. Regions that had been lost to the empire since the Battle of Manzikert were recovered and garrisoned. Yet resistance, particularly from the Danishmends of the northeast, was strong, and the difficult nature of holding the new conquests is illustrated by the fact that Kastamonu was recaptured by the Turks even as John was in Constantinople celebrating its return to Byzantine rule. John persevered, however, and Kastamonu soon changed hands once more.

In the spring of 1139, the emperor campaigned with success against Turks, probably nomadic Turkomans, who were raiding the regions along the Sangarios River, striking their means of subsistence by driving off their herds. He then marched for the final time against the Danishmend Turks, his army proceeding along the southern coast of the Black Sea through Bithynia and Paphlagonia. The breakaway Byzantine regime of Constantine Gabras in Trebizond was ended, and the region of Chaldia brought back under direct imperial control. John then besieged but failed to take the city of Neocaesarea, in 1140. The Byzantines were defeated by the conditions rather than by the Turks: the weather was very bad, large numbers of the army's horses died, and provisions became scarce.

=== Campaigning in Cilicia and Syria (1137–1138) ===
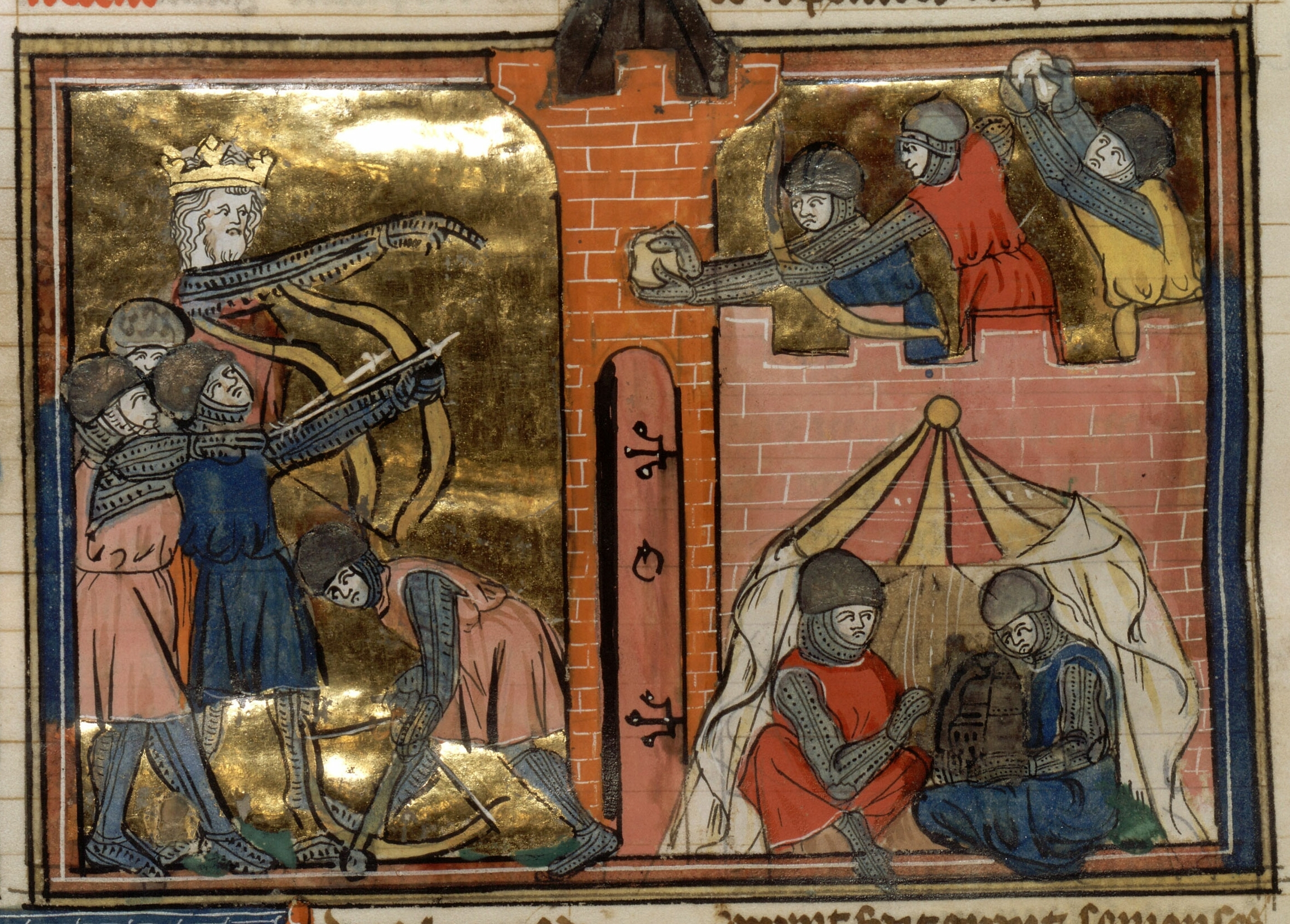
John II directs the Siege of Shaizar while his allies sit inactive in their camp, French manuscript 1338

In the Levant, the emperor sought to reinforce Byzantine claims to suzerainty over the Crusader States and to assert his rights over Antioch. In 1137 he conquered Tarsus, Adana, and Mopsuestia from the Principality of Armenian Cilicia, and in 1138 Prince Levon I of Armenia and most of his family were brought as captives to Constantinople. This opened the route to the Principality of Antioch, where Raymond of Poitiers, Prince of Antioch, and Joscelin II, Count of Edessa, recognized themselves as vassals of the emperor in 1137. Even Raymond II, the Count of Tripoli, hastened northwards to pay homage to John, repeating the homage that his predecessor had given John's father in 1109. There then followed a joint campaign as John led the armies of Byzantium, Antioch, and Edessa against Muslim Syria. Aleppo proved too strong to attack during an attempted siege, but the fortresses of Balat, Biza'a, Athareb, Maarat al-Numan, and Kafartab were taken by assault.

Although John fought hard for the Christian cause in the campaign in Syria, his allies, Prince Raymond of Antioch and Count Joscelin II of Edessa, remained in their camp playing dice and feasting instead of helping to press the siege of the city of Shaizar. The Crusader Princes were suspicious of each other and of John, and neither wanted the other to gain from participating in the campaign. Raymond also wanted to hold on to Antioch, which he had agreed to hand over to John if the campaign was successful in capturing Aleppo, Shaizar, Homs, and Hama. Latin and Muslim sources describe John's energy and personal courage in prosecuting the siege. The city was taken, but the citadel defied assault. The Emir of Shaizar offered to pay a large indemnity, become John's vassal, and pay yearly tribute. John had lost all confidence in his allies, and a Muslim army under Zengi was approaching to try to relieve the city, therefore the emperor reluctantly accepted the offer. The emperor was distracted by a Seljuq raid on Cilicia and developments in the west, where he was pursuing a German alliance directed against the threat posed by the Normans of Sicily. Joscelin and Raymond conspired to delay the promised handover of Antioch's citadel to the emperor, stirring up popular unrest in the city directed at John and the local Greek community. John had little choice but to leave Syria with his ambitions only partially realised.

=== Final campaigns (1142) ===
In early 1142 John campaigned against the Seljuqs of Iconium to secure his lines of communication through Attalia (Antalya). During this campaign his eldest son and co-emperor Alexios died of a fever. Having secured his route, John embarked on a new expedition into Syria determined to reduce Antioch to direct imperial rule. John does not seem to have made the extensive preparations that are evident for his 1137-38 campaign but nonetheless went east with a substantial force and moved very quickly. This suggests that John had learned on the previous campaign that such logistical preparations may not have been necessary and Cilicia was sufficient to supply his forces. Moreover, John was said to have settled matters in Isauria along the way, probably extending Roman control over the peoples in that upland region from the Sultanate of Rum. This expedition included a planned pilgrimage to Jerusalem on which he intended to take his army. King Fulk of Jerusalem, fearing that the emperor's presence with overwhelming military force would constrain him to make an act of homage and formally recognise Byzantine suzerainty over his kingdom, begged the emperor to bring only a modest escort. Fulk cited the inability of his largely barren kingdom to support the passage of a substantial army. This lukewarm response resulted in John II deciding to postpone his pilgrimage. John descended rapidly on northern Syria, forcing Joscelin II of Edessa to render hostages, including his daughter, as a guarantee of his good behaviour. He then advanced on Antioch demanding that the city and its citadel be surrendered to him. Raymond of Poitiers played for time, putting the proposal to the vote of the Antiochene general assembly. With the season well advanced John decided to take his army into winter quarters in Cilicia, proposing to renew his attack on Antioch the following year.

== Death and succession ==
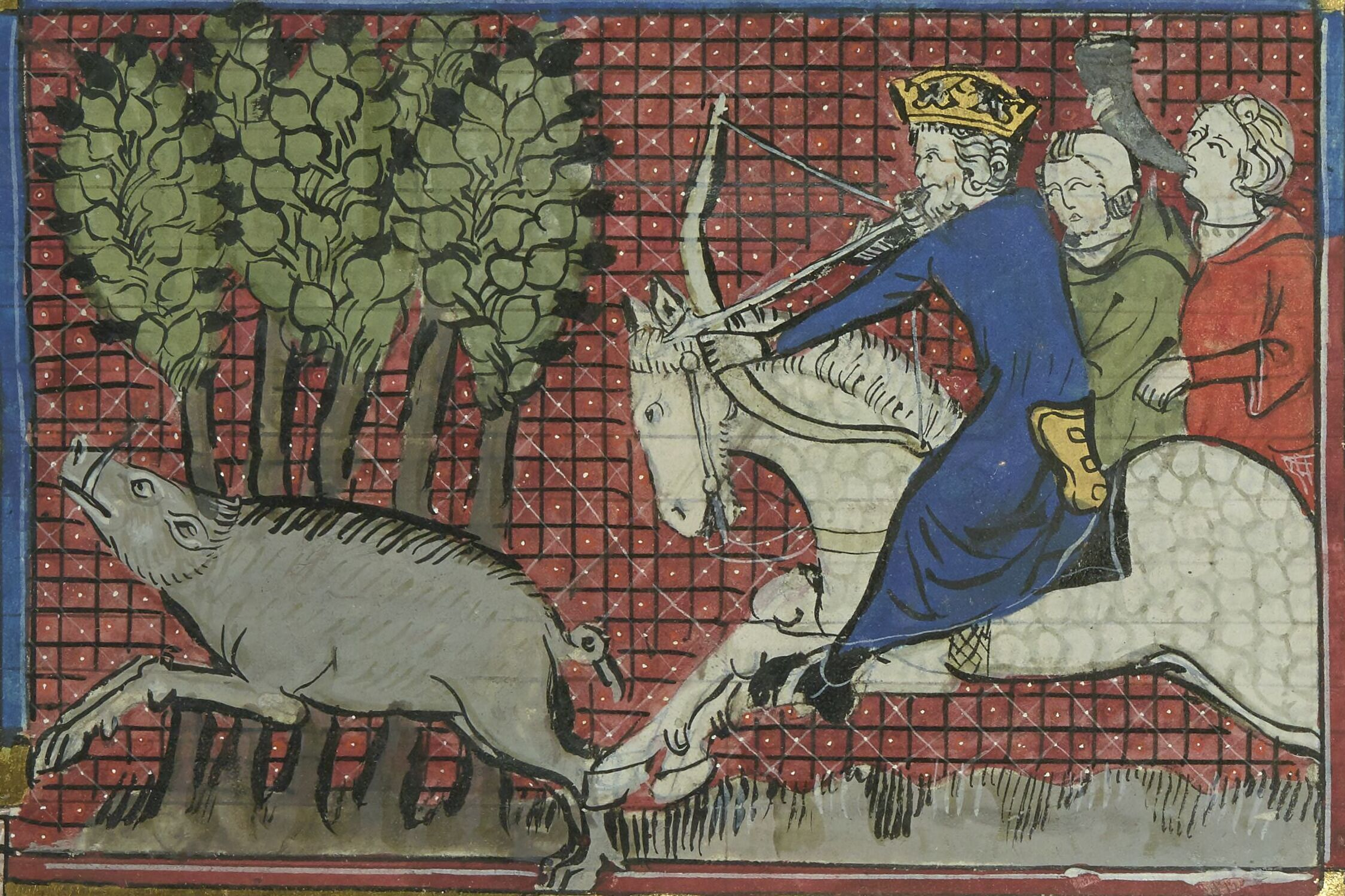
John II hunting, French manuscript of the 14th Century

Having prepared his army for a renewed attack on Antioch, John amused himself by hunting wild boar on Mount Taurus in Cilicia, where he accidentally cut himself on the hand with a poisoned arrow. John initially ignored the wound and it became infected. He died a number of days after the accident, on 8 April 1143, probably of septicaemia. It has been suggested that John was assassinated by a conspiracy within the units of his army of Latin origins who were unhappy at fighting their co-religionists of Antioch, and who wanted to place his pro-western son Manuel on the throne. However, there is very little overt support for this hypothesis in the primary sources. (Note: Two rather ambiguous Byzantine rhetorical allusions were the basis of this theory – all contemporary historical writing unanimously agrees on an accidental cause for the death of John II.)

John's final action as emperor was to choose Manuel, the younger of his surviving sons, to be his successor. John is recorded as citing two main reasons for choosing Manuel over his older brother Isaac: Isaac's irascibility, and the courage that Manuel had shown on campaign at Neocaesarea. Another theory alleges that the reason for this choice was the AIMA prophecy, which foretold that John's successor should be one whose name began with an "M". Fittingly, John's close friend John Axouch, although he is recorded as having tried hard to persuade the dying emperor that Isaac was the better candidate to succeed, was instrumental in ensuring that Manuel's assumption of power was free from any overt opposition.

== Legacy ==
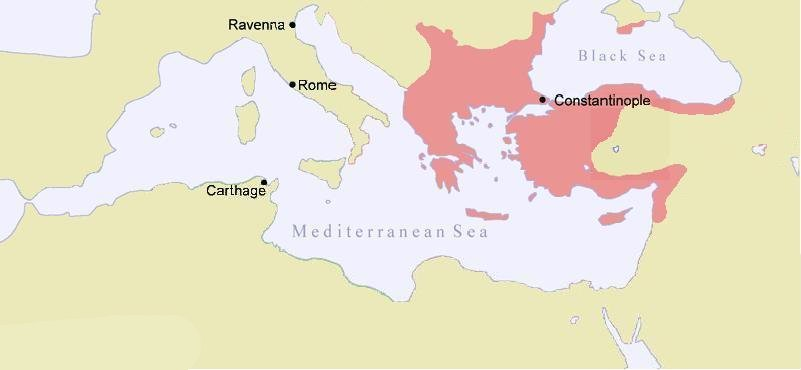
The Byzantine empire under John II Komnenos, c. 1143

Historian John Birkenmeier argued that John's reign was the most successful of the Komnenian period. In The Development of the Komnenian Army 1081–1180, he stresses the wisdom of John's approach to warfare, which focused on sieges rather than risking pitched battles. Birkenmeier argues that John's strategy of launching annual campaigns with limited, realistic objectives was a more sensible one than that followed by his son Manuel I. According to this view, John's campaigns benefited the Byzantine Empire because they protected the empire's heartland, which lacked reliable borders, while gradually extending its territory in Asia Minor. The Turks were forced onto the defensive, while John kept his diplomatic situation relatively simple by allying with the Holy Roman Emperor against the Normans of Sicily.

Overall, it is clear that John II Komnenos left the empire a great deal better off than he had found it. By the time of his death substantial territories had been recovered, and the goals of the recovery of control over central Anatolia and the re-establishment of a frontier on the Euphrates seemed achievable. However some Greeks of the interior of Anatolia were becoming increasingly accustomed to Turkish rule and often found it preferable to that of Byzantium, as seen in the Battle of Lake Pousgouse. Also, though it was relatively easy to extract submission and admissions of vassalage from the Anatolian Turks, Serbs and Crusader States of the Levant, converting these relationships into concrete gains for the security of the Empire had proven elusive. These problems were left for his gifted and mercurial son, Manuel, to attempt to solve.

== Family ==
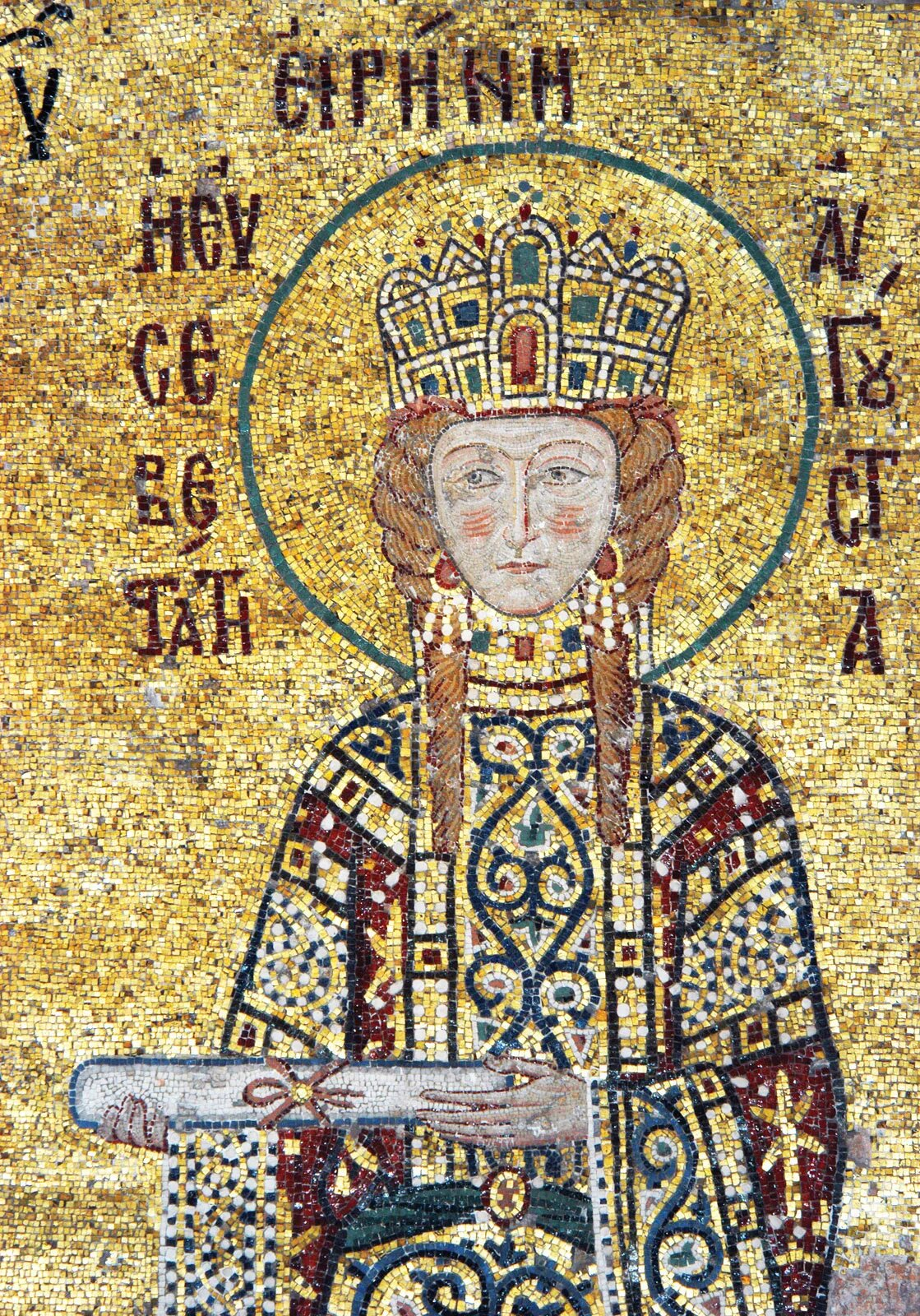
Empress Irene, from the Komnenos mosaic in the Hagia Sophia

John II Komnenos married Princess Piroska of Hungary (renamed Irene), a daughter of King Ladislaus I of Hungary in 1104; the marriage was intended as compensation for the loss of some territories to King Coloman of Hungary. She played little part in government, devoting herself to piety and their large brood of children. Irene died on 13 August 1134, and was later venerated as Saint Irene. John II and Irene had 8 children:

1. Alexios Komnenos (October 1106 – summer 1142), co-emperor from 1119 to 1142
2. Maria Komnene (twin to Alexios), who married John Roger Dalassenos
3. Andronikos Komnenos (died 1142)
4. Anna Komnene (c. 1110/11 – after 1149), who married the admiral Stephen Kontostephanos, who died in battle in 1149. The couple had four children.
5. Isaac Komnenos (c. 1113 – after 1154), raised to sebastokrator in 1122, he was superseded in the succession in favour of Manuel in 1143; married twice and had several children.
6. Theodora Komnene (c. 1115 – before May 1157), who married the military commander Manuel Anemas, who was killed in action, after which she entered a monastery. The couple had at least four children.
7. Eudokia Komnene (c. 1116 – before 1150), who married the military commander Theodore Vatatzes. She had at least six children, but died early.
8. Manuel I Komnenos (28 November 1118 – 21 September 1180), became emperor, and reigned 1143–1180.

== Ancestry ==
Ancestors of John II Komnenos

8. Manuel Erotikos Komnenos
4. John Komnenos
2. Alexios I Komnenos
5. Anna Dalassene
1. John II Komnenos
12. John Doukas
6. Andronikos Doukas
3. Irene Doukaina
7. Maria of Bulgaria

== See also ==
- Byzantium under the Komnenos dynasty
- Komnenian army
- List of Byzantine emperors

== Bibliography ==
=== Primary ===
- Niketas Choniates, critical edition and translation by Magoulias, Harry J., ed. (1984). O City of Byzantium: Annals of Niketas Choniatēs. Detroit: Wayne State University Press. ISBN 978-0-8143-1764-8.
- John Kinnamos, critical edition and translation by Brand, Charles M., ed. (1976). Deeds of John and Manuel Comnenus, by John Kinnamos. New York: Columbia University Press. ISBN 0-231-04080-6.
- William of Tyre, Historia Rerum in Partibus Transmarinis Gestarum (A History of Deeds Done Beyond the Sea), translated by E. A. Babock and A. C. Krey (Columbia University Press, 1943). See the original text in the Latin library.

=== Secondary ===
- Angold, Michael, (1984) The Byzantine Empire 1025–1204, a political history, Longman. ISBN 978-0-58-249060-4
- Angold, Michael, (1995) Church and Society in Byzantium under the Comneni, 1081–1261. Cambridge University Press.Poetry and its Contexts in Eleventh-century Byzantium
- Bernard, F. and Demoen, K. (2013) Poetry and its Contexts in Eleventh-century Byzantium, Ashgate Publishing
- Birkenmeier, John W. (2002). The Development of the Komnenian Army: 1081–1180. Brill. ISBN 90-04-11710-5.
- Bucossi, Alessandra and Suarez, Alex R. (2016) John II Komnenos, emperor of Byzantium: in the shadow of father and son, Routledge. ISBN 978-1-47-246024-0
- Dennis, G.T. (2001) Death in Byzantium, Dumbarton Oaks Papers, Vol. 55, pp. 1–7, Dumbarton Oaks, Trustees for Harvard University
- Fine, John V. A. Jr. (1991) [1983]. The Early Medieval Balkans: A Critical Survey from the Sixth to the Late Twelfth Century. Ann Arbor: University of Michigan Press. ISBN 0-472-08149-7.
- Finlay, George (1854), History of the Byzantine and Greek Empires from 1057–1453, Volume 2, William Blackwood & Sons
- Haldon, John (1999). Warfare, State and Society in the Byzantine World, 565–1204. London: UCL Press. ISBN 1-85728-495-X.
- Harris, Jonathan (2014), Byzantium and the Crusades, Bloomsbury, 2nd ed. ISBN 978-1-78093-767-0
- Hendy, Michael F. (1999). Catalogue of the Byzantine Coins in the Dumbarton Oaks Collection. Vol. 4. Dumbarton Oaks. pp. 244–274. ISBN 9780884022336.
- Holt, P.M.; Lambton, Ann K.S.; Lewis, Bernard (1995). The Cambridge History of Islam. Vol. 1A. Cambridge University Press.
- Lau, Maximilian C. G. (2023). Emperor John II Komnenos Rebuilding New Rome 1118-1143. Oxford: Oxford University Press.
- Linardou, K. (2016) "Imperial Impersonations", in John II Komnenos, Emperor of Byzantium: In the Shadow of Father and Son, Bucossi, A. and Suarez, A.R. (eds.) pp. 155–182, Routledge, Abingdon and New York. ISBN 978-1-4724-6024-0
- Loos, Milan (1974) Dualist Heresy in the Middle Ages Vol. 10, Springer, The Hague.
- Magdalino, Paul (1993). The Empire of Manuel I Komnenos, 1143–1180. Cambridge: Cambridge University Press. ISBN 0-521-52653-1.
- Magdalino, P. (2016) "The Triumph of 1133", in John II Komnenos, Emperor of Byzantium: In the Shadow of Father and Son, Bucossi, A. and Suarez, A.R. (eds.) pp. 53–70, Routledge, Abingdon and New York. ISBN 978-1-4724-6024-0
- McMahon, Lucas (2026). "Avoiding Konya: How to go to the Holy Land in the Twelfth Century". Journal of Medieval History. 52 (1): 1–36. doi:10.1080/03044181.2025.2568481.
- Neville, L. (2016) "Anna Komnene: The Life & Work of a Medieval Historian", Oxford University Press.
- Necipoğlu, Nevra (ed.) (2001) Byzantine Constantinople, Brill.
- Norwich, John J. Byzantium; Vol. 3: The Decline and Fall. Viking, 1995 ISBN 0-670-82377-5
- Ostrogorsky, G. (1980) History of the Byzantine State, tr. J. Hussey, Oxford
- Ousterhhout, R. (2016) "Architecture and patronage in the age of John II", in John II Komnenos, Emperor of Byzantium: In the Shadow of Father and Son, Bucossi, A. and Suarez, A. R. (eds.), pp. 135–154, Routledge, Abingdon and New York. ISBN 978-1-4724-6024-0
- Runciman, Steven (1952) A History of the Crusades, Vol. II: The Kingdom of Jerusalem, Cambridge University Press.
- Stankovic, V. (2016) "John II Komnenos Before the Year 1118", in John II Komnenos, Emperor of Byzantium: In the Shadow of Father and Son, Bucossi, A. and Suarez, A. R. (eds.), pp. 11–21, Routledge, Abingdon and New York. ISBN 978-1-4724-6024-0
- Stathakopoulos, D. (2016) "John II Komnenos: a historiographical essay", in John II Komnenos, Emperor of Byzantium: In the Shadow of Father and Son, Bucossi, A. and Suarez, A. R. (eds.), pp. 1–10, Routledge, Abingdon and New York. ISBN 978-1-4724-6024-0
- Treadgold, Warren (1997). A History of the Byzantine State and Society. Stanford, California: Stanford University Press. ISBN 0-8047-2630-2.
- Urbansky, Andrew B. Byzantium and the Danube Frontier, Twayne Publishers, 1968
- Varzos, Konstantinos (1984). Η Γενεαλογία των Κομνηνών [The Genealogy of the Komnenoi] (PDF) (in Greek). Vol. A1. Thessaloniki: Centre for Byzantine Studies, University of Thessaloniki.

John II Komnenos Komnenian dynasty Born: 13 September 1087 Died: 8 April 1143
Regnal titles
Preceded by Alexios I	Byzantine emperor 1118–1143 with Alexios I (father) as senior co-emperor (1092–18); Alexios (son) as junior co-emperor (1119–42)	Succeeded by Manuel I
