= Kata (daughter of David IV) =

Kata or Katay (Georgian: კატა, კატაჲ) was a daughter of King David IV of Georgia. She married into the Byzantine imperial family c. 1116, but the identity of her husband is not revealed in the medieval sources. There are three modern hypotheses regarding her marriage.

== Marriage ==
=== Medieval chronicle ===
Kata's marriage is mentioned by the 12th-century History of the King of Kings David, part of the compiled Georgian Chronicles, which does not specify the name of her husband. The chronicle extols Kata and her sister, Tamar, a wife of the shah of Shirvan, as luminaries of the West and the East, respectively, reflecting the splendor of their father.

=== Modern theories ===
There are different scholarly opinions as to who exactly was Kata's spouse. According to a hypothesis commonly accepted by historians in Georgia, she married Isaac Komnenos, the third son of the emperor Alexios I Komnenos, and became Irene, a name recorded by the Byzantine sources as that of Isaac's wife. If the hypothesis is true and Helene, a daughter of Isaac and Kata, was indeed the wife of the Rurikid Rus' prince Yuri Dolgorukiy, then it may provide, through descent from antiquity, a Bagratid ancestry to numerous Russian and Polish descendants. Alternatively, Isaac's wife Irene may have been the same person as an anonymous daughter of Volodar of Peremyshl known from the Slavonic Primary Chronicle to have married the likewise unnamed son of the emperor Alexios.

Another version given currency, among other scholars, by Cyril Toumanoff, holds that Kata was married to the megas doux Alexios Komnenos, a son of Nikephoros Bryennios the Younger and Anna Komnena.

The third hypothesis, supported by Paul Gautier and Mihail-Dimitri Sturdza, states that Kata's husband was Alexios Komnenos, the eldest son and co-emperor of the Byzantine emperor John II Komnenos. The Byzantine chronicle of Joannes Zonaras mentions the arrival of the Georgian (Abasgian) bride of the elder son of John II at Constantinople immediately after his accession to the throne, not long after 1118.

== See also ==
- Family of David IV of Georgia
