= Kata (daughter of George I of Georgia) =

Kata or Katay (Georgian: კატა; კატაჲ) was a Georgian royal princess (batonishvili) of the Bagrationi dynasty.

Daughter of King George I of Georgia. She was a wife of Abbas I of Kars (984–1029).
