= Siege of Preslav (1185) =

- Part of the Uprising of Asen and Peter & Byzantine-Bulgarian wars
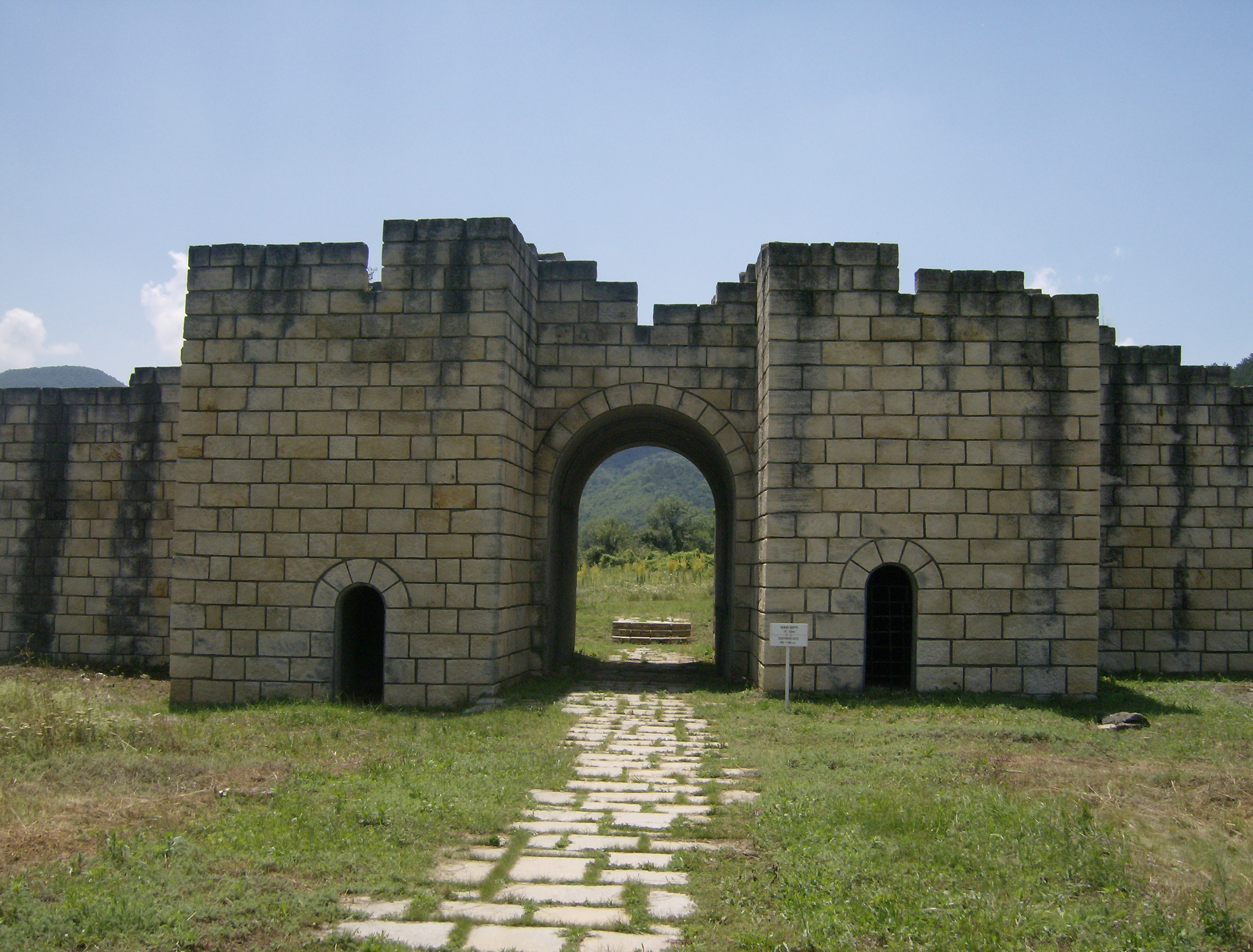
- Old walls of Preslav
| Date | Late 1185 |
| Location | Preslav, Bulgaria |
| Result | Byzantine victory |

Belligerents
| Byzantine Empire | Bulgarians; Vlachs |

Commanders and leaders
| Unknown garrison commander | Theodore Peter; Ivan Asen |

Strength
| Unknown (Heavily fortified garrison) | Unknown |

Casualties and losses
| Unknown | Unknown |

The Siege of Preslav was an early military engagement during the Uprising of Asen and Peter. The conflict marked the transition of the anti-Byzantine movement from a localized tax revolt into a broader political and military campaign aimed at restoring the Bulgarian state as the Second Bulgarian Empire.

== Background ==
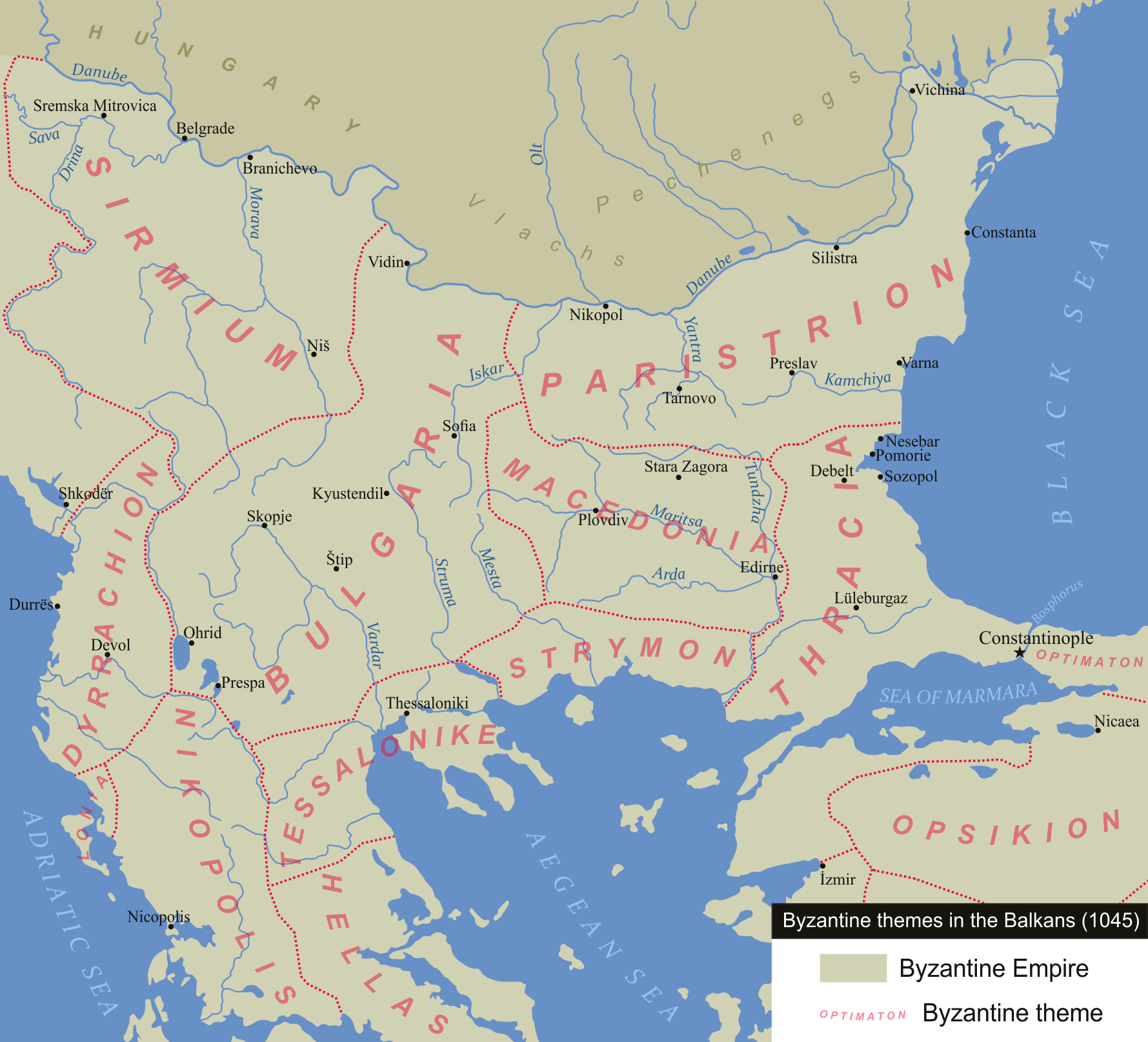
The Byzantine themes (or districts) of Bulgaria and Paristrion

By 1185, the Byzantine Empire was experiencing severe internal decay and dynastic instability. To fund his lavish imperial wedding to the daughter of King Béla III of Hungary, Byzantine Emperor Isaac II Angelos levied an exorbitant new tax. This economic burden fell disproportionately on the pastoral Vlach and Bulgarian populations living along the Haemus (Balkan) Mountains.

Seeking a peaceful resolution, two aristocratic brothers, Theodore Peter and Ivan Asen, traveled to Kypsella in Thrace to negotiate directly with the Emperor, requesting:

- Integration into the standard Byzantine military rolls.
- Grants of land near the Haemus Mountains to provide the revenue needed to pay the new taxes.

The Emperor aggressively rejected their request where the brothers retaliated by arguing resulting in Asen being strucked in the face by an imperial courtier. (Note: While Nicetas Choniates notes that the slap was delivered on the orders of the Emperor's uncle, John Doukas, for Asen's insolence, some later historians speculate that Emperor Isaac II Angelos may have struck the blow himself, or that it was carried out by another high-ranking imperial commander present at the encampment.)

Humiliated, the brothers returned to Moesia and vowed to launch a total rebellion. To mobilize the hesitant local population, they constructed the Church of St. Demetrius in Tărnovo. They claimed that Saint Demetrius—the traditional patron protector of Byzantine Thessaloniki, had abandoned the Greeks and chosen to guide the Bulgarians to freedom. Inspired by this religious omen, the population revolted on October 26, 1185.

== Siege of Preslav ==
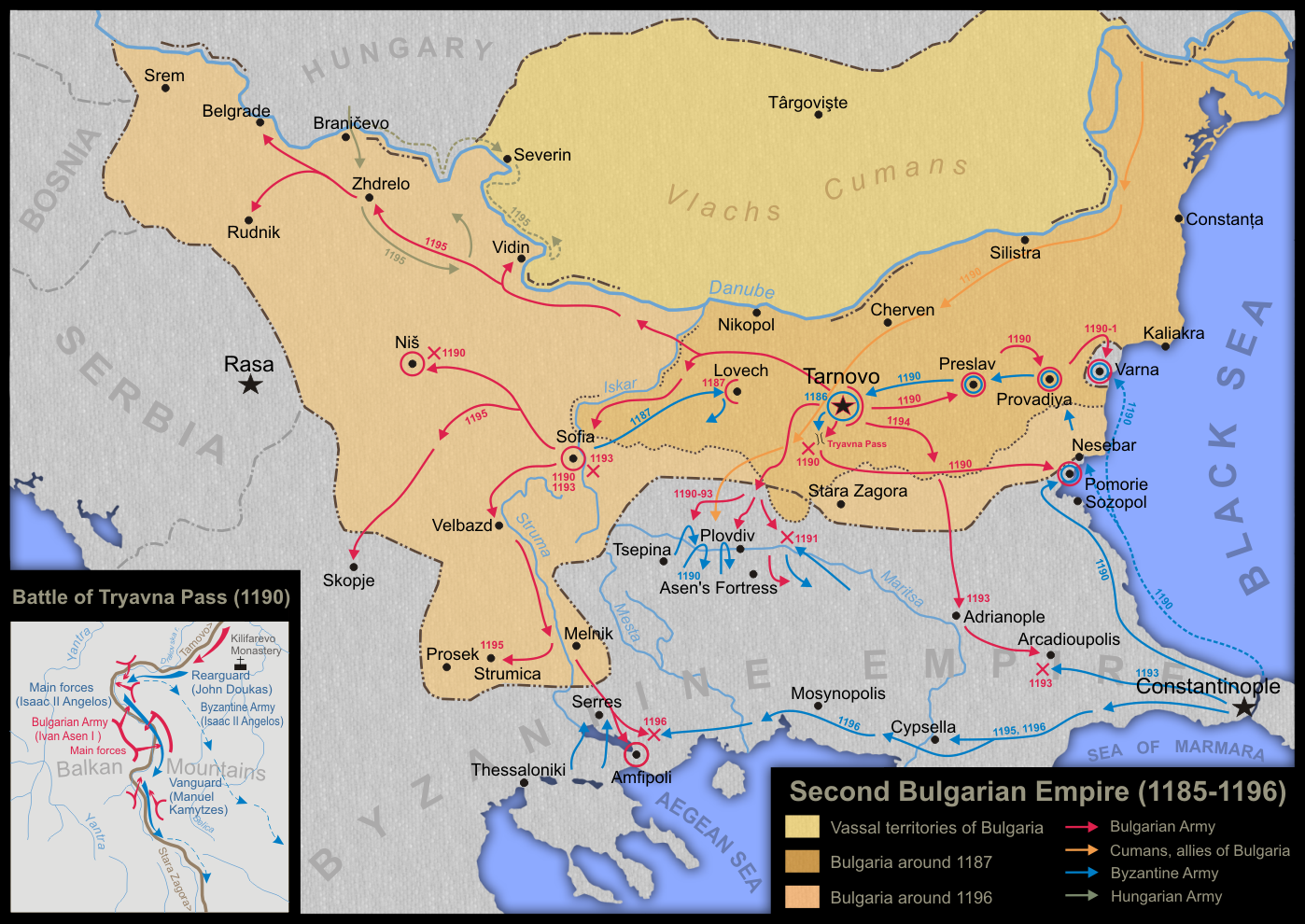
Territorial expansion under the Bulgarian state.

The newly formed rebel army achieved rapid early successes, raiding Byzantine estates and capturing prisoners across northern Bulgaria. Seeking a powerful symbol to legitimize their claim to statehood, the Asen brothers marched their forces directly to Preslav, the historic capital of the fallen First Bulgarian Empire.

When the rebels arrived in late 1185, they launched a ferocious assault to take the city by storm. However, Preslav was heavily fortified with massive outer stone and brick fortification walls. The local Byzantine garrison commander refused to surrender, relying on the city's architectural defenses. Unable to breach the inner stone fortresses and recognizing that a prolonged, formal siege would leave them vulnerable to an imperial counter-offensive from Constantinople, the Bulgarian forces failed to capture the fortress of Preslav. Ultimately, the rebel army was forced to abandon the assault and break away.

== Aftermath ==
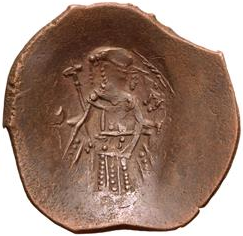
Coin of Bulgarian emperor Ivan Asen I.

Despite failing to physically conquer the city, the raid on Preslav carried immense political weight. Immediately following the symbolic event, Theodore Peter donned the imperial scarlet buskins and a gold chaplet, formally proclaiming himself Tsar Peter II of a restored Bulgarian state. Since Preslav remained in Byzantine hands, the brothers established their primary seat of power further west at the naturally fortified mountain fortress of Tărnovo.

Shocked by Peter's coronation, Isaac II Angelos mobilized an army. In early 1186, he appointed his uncle, Sebastokrator John Doukas, to lead the overall field campaign to crush the uprising. John Doukas achieved minor successes but was relieved of command due to political suspicion. The war dragged on until a 1187 truce recognized Bulgarian independence.

Preslav itself was eventually liberated by the Bulgarians following subsequent military campaigns, later serving as Tsar Peter II's personal administrative seat.

== Bibliography ==
- Chary, Frederick B. (2011). The History of Bulgaria. Greenwood. ISBN 9780313384479.
- Curta, Florin (2006). Southeastern Europe in the Middle Ages, 500–1250. Cambridge University Press. ISBN 9780521815390. "Southeastern Europe in the Middle Ages, 500–1250."
- Dall'Aglio, Francesco (2013). "The interaction between nomadic and sedentary peoples on the Lower Danube: the Cumans and the "Second Bulgarian Empire"". In Curta, Florin; Maleon, Bogdan–Petru (eds.). The Steppe Lands and the World Beyond Them: Studies in Honor of Victor Spinei on his 70th Birthday. Editura Universității "Alexandru Ian Cuza". pp. 299–313. ISBN 9789737039330.
- Fine, John V. A. (1994). The Late Medieval Balkans: A Critical Survey from the Late Twelfth Century to the Ottoman Conquest. The University of Michigan Press. ISBN 0472082604.
- Madgearu, Alexandru (2017). The Asanids: The Political and Military History of the Second Bulgarian Empire, 1185–1280. Brill Publishers. ISBN 9789004325012.
- Petkov, Kiril (2008). The Voices of Medieval Bulgaria, Seventh-Fifteenth Century: The Records of a Bygone Culture. Brill Publishers. ISBN 9789004168312.
- Simpson, Alicia (2016). "Byzantium's Retreating Balkan Frontiers during the reign of the Angeloi (1185–1203): A Reconsideration". In Stanković, Vlada (ed.). The Balkans and the Byzantine World before and after the Captures of Constantinople, 1204 and 1453. Lexington Books. pp. 3–22. ISBN 9781498513258.
- Stephenson, Paul (2000). Byzantium's Balkan Frontier: A Political Study of the Northern Balkans, 900–1204. Cambridge University Press. ISBN 9780521027564.
- Treadgold, Warren (1997). A History of the Byzantine State and Society. Stanford University Press. ISBN 0804726302.
- Vásáry, István (2005). Cumans and Tatars: Oriental Military in the Pre-Ottoman Balkans, 1185–1365. Cambridge University Press. ISBN 0521837561.
