= Siege of Lovech =

Coordinates: 43°07′40″N 24°42′57″E

- Part of the Byzantine–Bulgarian wars
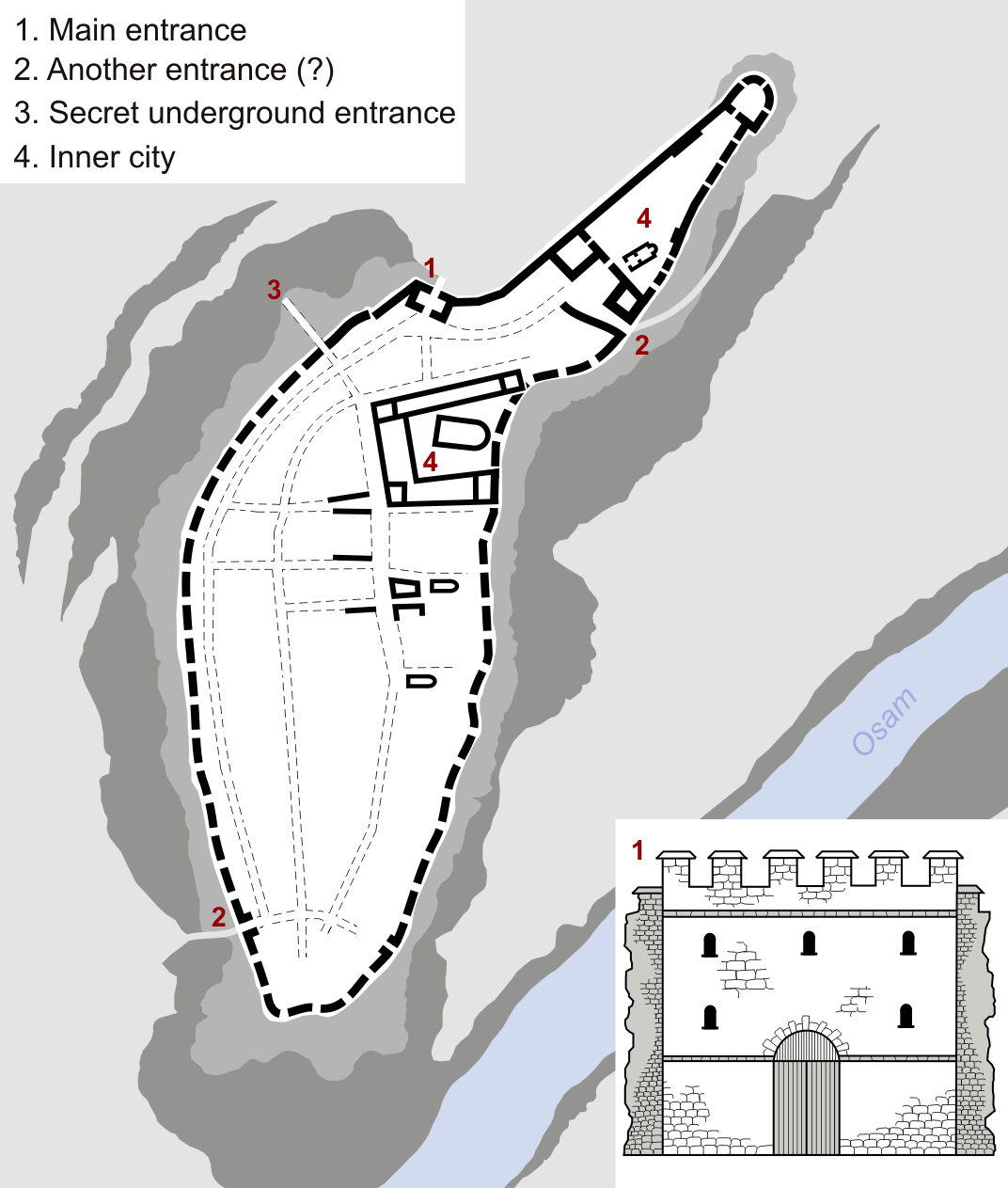
- Lovech Fortress Plan.
Date	Spring 1187
Location	Lovech
Result	Bulgarian victory

Belligerents
Bulgarian Empire	Byzantine Empire

Commanders and leaders
Unknown	Isaac II Angelos

The siege of Lovech (Bulgarian: Обсада на Ловеч, romanized: Obsada na Lovech) took place in the spring of 1187 between the forces of Bulgaria and the Byzantine Empire. The three-month siege resulted in Bulgarian victory and Byzantine defeat.

== Origins of the conflict ==
In 1185, the brothers Asen and Peter led an uprising against the Byzantines to restore the Bulgarian Empire. The whole region of Moesia except for Varna was quickly liberated and the brothers started attacking the Byzantine garrisons to the south of the Balkan Mountains. The Bulgarian tactics included quick assaults and haste movement and the Byzantines were unable to charge them.

In order to change that situation, the Byzantine Emperor, Isaac II Angelos, decided to move the military actions to northern Bulgaria and strike directly to the rebel's heartlands around Tarnovo.

== The siege ==
In the late autumn of 1186, the Byzantine army marched northwards through Sredets (Sofia). The campaign was planned to surprise the Bulgarians. However, the harsh weather conditions and the early winter postponed the Byzantines and their army had to stay in Sredets during the whole winter.

In the spring of the following year, the campaign was resumed, but the element of surprise was gone and the Bulgarians had taken measures to bar the way to their capital Tarnovo. Instead the Byzantines besieged the strong fortress of Lovech. The siege lasted for three months and was a complete failure. Their only success was the capture of Asen's wife in an ambush, but Isaac was forced to accept a truce thus de facto recognizing the restoration of the Bulgarian Empire.

== Aftermath ==
According to the treaty, the youngest of the Asen brothers, Kaloyan, was sent as a hostage to Constantinople to guarantee the peace, whilst the captured wife of Asen was released. However, Niketas Choniates noted that the situation became even more grim for the Byzantines because soon after the Bulgarians in Macedonia rebelled under Dobromir Chrysos.

The peace lasted until 1189 when, due to the Bulgarian proposal to support the Third Crusade against the Byzantines, Isaac Angelos launched another campaign and suffered a heavy defeat in the Battle of Tryavna.

== Sources ==
- Йордан Андреев, Милчо Лалков, Българските ханове и царе, Велико Търново, 1996.
