= John Kantakouzenos (Caesar) =

John Kantakouzenos (Greek: Ἰωάννης Καντακουζηνός; fl. 1183–86) was a military commander and an early member of the Kantakouzenos family. The contemporary historian Niketas Choniates describes him as a brave, audacious and experienced soldier but frequently led astray by his foolhardiness and presumption.

== Life ==
He was one of the victims of the reign of terror unleashed by the usurper Andronikos I Komnenos (reigned 1183–1185) in 1183, who had him blinded, though possibly not completely, then thrown into prison, because he attacked a court eunuch who blamed the disasters befalling the empire on the incompetence of Andronikos' predecessor, his under-age nephew Alexios II Komnenos (r. 1180–1183). Donald Nicol argues this shows he was a partisan of the House of Angelos, and he had his reward when Isaac II Angelos (r. 1185–1195, 1203–1204) came to the throne in 1185: the new emperor give him the rank of Caesar and appointed him to command the expedition against the Bulgarians in 1186, who had recently rebelled against the Byzantine rule and had restored the Bulgarian Empire. The rebels did not oppose the Byzantines in the open field, and instead retired to their mountain stronghold. John followed them there, but due to his overconfidence neglected to fortify his camp and allowed it to be surrounded, suffering a humiliating defeat. His robes of office were captured and displayed by the Bulgarian leaders Peter and Asen. John was relieved of command by the Emperor in favour of Alexios Branas, and lived in retirement.

He married Irene Angelina, daughter of Andronikos Doukas Angelos and sister of the emperors Isaac II and Alexios III Angelos (r. 1195–1203). The marriage was first disallowed by the Patriarch of Constantinople, Luke Chrysoberges, and the then-reigning emperor, Manuel I Komnenos (r. 1143–1180), because a seventh degree of consanguinity existed between John and Irene. However, in 1185/86, after Isaac Angelos came to power, a synod overthrew Patriarch Basil II Kamateros—an appointee of Andronikos I—and the new patriarch, Niketas Mountanes, gave his approval to the marriage. They appear to have had a son, for the man was put forth as a possible candidate to the throne during the illness of Alexios III. John's parents are not known, but he may have been brother to Theodore Kantakouzenos (died 1184), whom Niketas Choniates states was killed assisting Isaac Angelos defend the city of Nicaea against Andronikos Komnenos.

== Sources ==
- Brand, Charles M. (1968). Byzantium Confronts the West, 1180–1204. Cambridge, Massachusetts: Harvard University Press. LCCN 67-20872. OCLC 795121713.
- Nicol, Donald M. (1968). The Byzantine Family of Kantakouzenos (Cantacuzenus), ca. 1100–1460: A Genealogical and Prosopographical Study. Dumbarton Oaks studies 11. Washington, DC: Dumbarton Oaks Center for Byzantine Studies. OCLC 390843.
