= Battle of Serres (1196) =

Battle in 1196 in the Balkans

Coordinates: 41°5′N 23°33′E

- Part of the Byzantine–Bulgarian wars
Date	1196
Location	near Serres, Greece
Result	Bulgarian victory

Belligerents
Bulgarian Empire	Byzantine Empire

Commanders and leaders
Ivan Asen I	Sebastokrator Isaac

The Battle of Serres (Bulgarian: Битка при Сяр, Greek: Μάχη των Σερρών) took place in 1196 near the town of Serres in contemporary Greece between the armies of the Bulgarian and Byzantine empires. The result of the battle was Bulgarian victory.

== Origins of the conflict ==
After the beginning of the anti-Byzantine rebellion in 1185 and especially after the victory at Tryavna the Bulgarians firmly took the initiative of the war. As a result of their efforts, the Bulgarians started capturing regions of Thrace and Macedonia from Byzantines; the Bulgarian army used their strongholds to the north of the Balkan Mountains and the Danube river as bases for the war.

Between 1190 and 1195 many towns to the south and south-west were seized. During his preparation for a third campaign against Bulgaria, the Byzantine Emperor Isaac II Angelos was dethroned by his brother Alexios III Angelos who offered peace to the Bulgarian Emperor. Ivan Asen I demanded the return of all Bulgarian lands, which he knew it was impossible for the Byzantines to accept, and continued the struggle.

== Battle ==
In the same year, the Bulgarian army advanced deep to the south-west and reached the vicinity of Serres taking many fortresses on its way. During the winter, the Bulgarians retreated to the north but in the next year reappeared and defeated a Byzantine army under the sebastokrator Isaac near the town. In the course of the battle, the Byzantine cavalry was surrounded, suffering heavy casualties, and their commander was captured.

== Aftermath ==
Instead of a triumphal return, the way back to the Bulgarian capital ended tragically. Slightly before reaching Tarnovo, Ivan Asen I was murdered by his cousin Ivanko, who had been allegedly bribed by the Byzantines. Still, their attempts to stop the Bulgarians failed: Ivanko could not take the throne and had to flee to Byzantium. The Bulgarians advanced further during the reign of Kaloyan (r. 1197–1207).
