= Battle of Arcadiopolis =

Battle of Arcadiopolis may refer to:

- Battle of Arcadiopolis (970), between the Byzantines and a Rus'-Bulgarian army
- Battle of Arcadiopolis (1194), between the Byzantines and the Bulgarians
