= Petar II =

Petar II may refer to:

- Petar II of Bulgaria, Bulgarian tsar (ruled 1186–1197)
- Petar II Petrović-Njegoš, the Montenegrin ruler (1813–1851)
- Peter II of Yugoslavia, the Yugoslavian king (ruled 1934–1945)
