= Ivan Asen I =

Emperor of Bulgaria from 1187/1188 to 1196

Ivan Asen I Иван Асен I
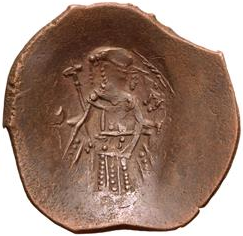
- Coin of Ivan Asen I

Tsar of Bulgaria; together with Peter II
- Reign: 1187/1188 – 1196
- Predecessor: Peter II
- Successor: Kaloyan
- Died: 1196; Tarnovo
- Spouse: Elena
- Issue: Ivan Asen II; Alexander
- Dynasty: Asen dynasty

Ivan Asen I, also known as Asen I, Ioan Asen Belgun or John Asen I (Bulgarian: Иван Асен I; died in 1196), was emperor or tsar of Bulgaria from 1187/1188 to 1196 as co-ruler with his elder brother, Peter II. Hailing from the Byzantine theme of Paristrion, his exact place and date of birth are unknown. Most contemporaneous chronicles describe Asen and his brothers, Theodor (Peter) and Kaloyan, as Vlachs but they were most likely of mixed Bulgarian, Cuman and Vlach ancestry.

In 1185, Asen and Theodor went to see the Byzantine Emperor Isaac II Angelos in Thrace to demand an estate in the Balkan Mountains. After the Emperor refused and humiliated them, the brothers persuaded their Bulgarian and Vlach compatriots to rise up against the Byzantine Empire. Before the end of the year, Theodor was crowned Emperor of Bulgaria, taking the name Peter. After Isaac II defeated them in early 1186, Asen and Peter fled north over the Danube but returned in the autumn, accompanied by Cuman reinforcements. They captured Paristrion and began pillaging the nearby Byzantine territories.

Asen became his brother's co-ruler in 1187 or 1188. They divided their realm around 1192, with Asen receiving Tarnovo and its region. Asen made a series of raids against Byzantine territories and expanded his rule over the lands along the Struma River in the early 1190s. A boyar, Ivanko, stabbed him to death in 1196.

== Early life ==
The careers of Asen and his brother, Theodor, suggest they were descended from a prominent family, (Note: They could directly approach the monarch and mobilize their compatriots. (Simpson 2016, pp. 6–7.).) according to historian Alicia Simpson. Historian Alexandru Madgearu says their father was most probably a wealthy man who owned herds in the Balkan Mountains. Asen's birth date is unknown.

The Synodikon of Tsar Boril calls him "Ioan Asen Belgun". One of the Lives of Ivan of Rila confirms that Ivan (or Ioan) was his baptismal name. His other two names are of Turkic origin: Asen came from a Turkic word meaning "sound, safe, healthy", Belgun from a word for "wise". The ethnic background of Asen and his brothers is still a source of controversy among historians. Chronicles written in the late 12th and early 13th centuries unanimously described them as Vlachs (predecessors of modern Romanians). Their close relationship with the Cumans, and the Turkic etymology of Asan's names, implies they were of Cuman or Pecheneg stock. According to a scholarly theory, the multiethnic character of their homeland, the Byzantine theme (or district) of Paristrion, makes it probable that Bulgarians, Vlachs and Cumans were among their ancestors.

Robert of Clari, author of a chronicle of the early history of the Latin Empire of Constantinople, stated that Asen (whom Clari confused with his younger brother, Kaloyan) had "once [been] a sergeant of the emperor, having charge of one of the emperor's horse farms". He noted that Asen was obliged to send sixty to one hundred horses to the imperial army at the Emperor's order. According to Simpson, Clari's report may only show that Asen was not a landowner, but a pastoralist.

In the autumn of 1185, the Byzantine Emperor Isaac II Angelos encamped at Kypsela in Thrace (now İpsala in Turkey) during his campaign against the Normans of Sicily, who had invaded the Byzantine Empire. Theodor and Asen came to the camp to meet with the Emperor. Byzantine historian Niketas Choniates suggests they came only to provide grounds for their uprising. Clari says, Asen, as the manager of an imperial horse farm, was to come to the imperial court "once a year".

Theodor and Asen requested a grant from the Emperor, but its nature is uncertain. The words of Choniates, who recorded the events, suggest they applied for a pronoia (revenues of an imperial estate). On the other hand, a pronoia of little value was seldom granted personally by the monarch. This implies the brothers demanded something more, such as the governorship of a district, or the administration of a semi-independent territory, according to modern scholarly theories. The Emperor rebuffed the brothers' request, but they dared to argue with his decision. Asen, whom Choniates characterized as the "more insolent and savage of the two", was especially impertinent and was "struck across the face and rebuked for impudence" at the command of Isaac II's uncle, John Doukas. They were not detained and could leave the Emperor's camp.

== Uprising ==
=== Beginnings ===
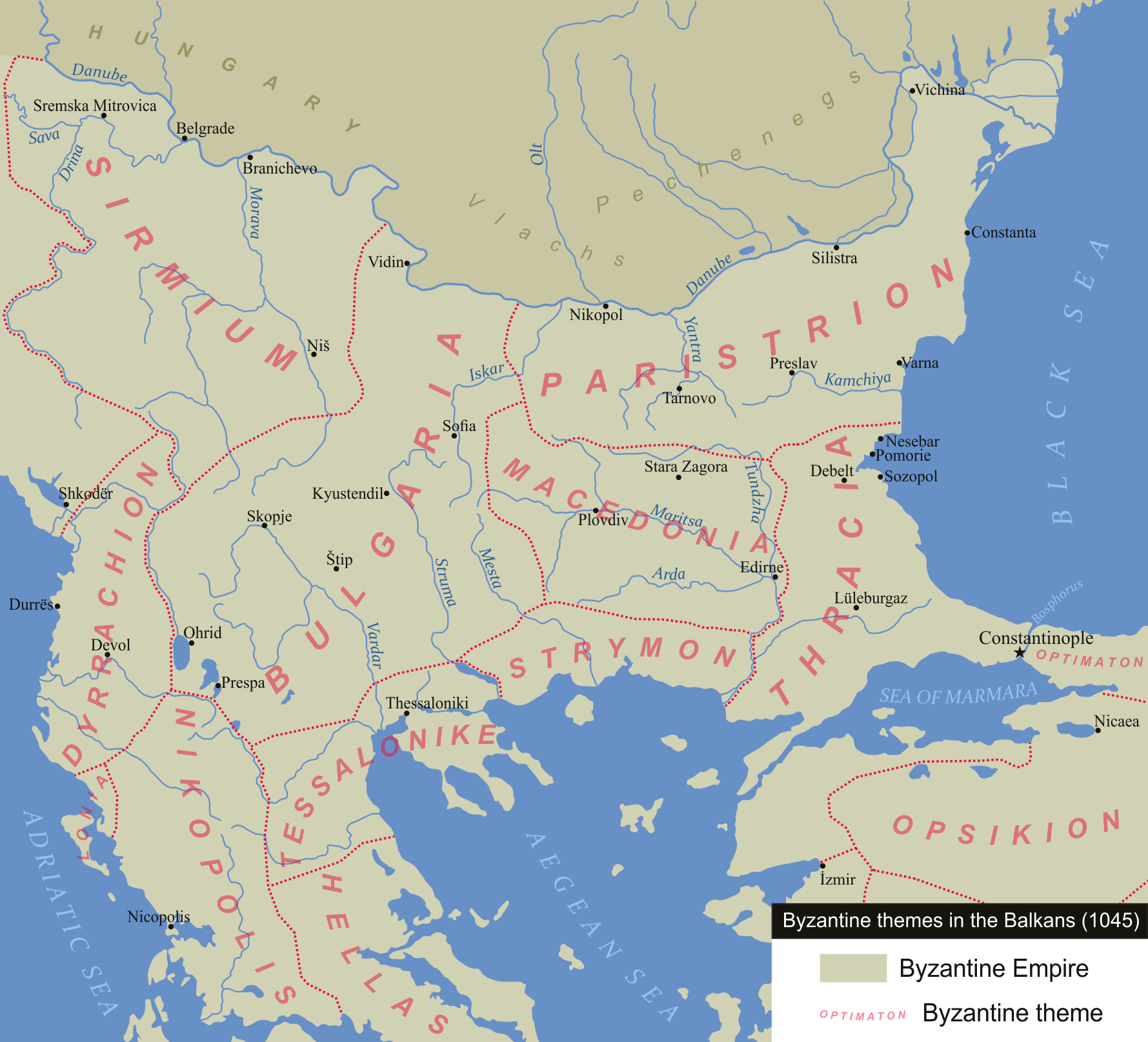
The Byzantine themes (or districts) of Bulgaria and Paristrion

A special tax, levied to finance the Emperor's marriage to Margaret of Hungary had brought the Bulgarian and Vlach population to the edge of an uprising before the public humiliation of Asen and his brother at the imperial camp. In spite of the general discontent, the brothers were initially unable to stir up a rebellion, because their compatriots did not believe they had any chance against the imperial troops. Theodor and Asen took advantage of the sack of Thessalonica by the Normans, during which icons of Demetrius of Thessalonica, the patron saint of the town, were taken to Bulgaria. They built a "house of prayer" and summoned Bulgarian and Vlach shamans to the site. The brothers instructed these "demoniacs", as Choniates called them, to declare before the mob that God "had consented to their freedom" and Saint Demetrius would "come over to them" from Thessalonica "to be their helper and assistant" against the Byzantines.

Theodor was crowned and assumed the name Peter, thus adopting the name of the 10th-century tsar (or emperor) of Bulgaria Peter I. The coronation and Theodor's new name are evidence the brothers wanted to demonstrate from the beginning they had established a state which was the political successor of the First Bulgarian Empire. They laid siege to Preslav, the old capital of the Bulgarian Empire but could not capture it. During the first months of 1186, the brothers made plundering raids against Thrace, seizing captives and cattle. Isaac II led a counteroffensive against the rebels in person, but they resisted the invaders hiding in "inaccessible places" in the mountains. It was only the solar eclipse of 21 April 1186 that enabled the imperial troops to mount an unexpected attack and defeat the rioters. Peter and Asen fled from their homeland and crossed the Lower Danube, seeking military assistance from the Cumans.

Isaac II thought his victory was decisive and returned to Constantinople without securing the defense of Paristrion. Peter and Asen made an alliance with some Cuman chieftains who helped them to return to the Byzantine Empire in the autumn. Choniates wrote contradictory reports about the negotiations between the brothers and the Cumans. In a formal speech, he attributed the alliance to Peter's efforts; in his chronicle, he emphasized Asen's role. Shortly after their return, the brothers took control of Paristrion and launched a plundering expedition against Thrace. Asen's military tactics—the application of sudden raids and quick withdrawals—prevented the imperial troops from making successful counterattacks. Choniates emphasized the brothers were not simply content to seize Paristrion but had decided to "unite the political power of Paristrion and Bulgaria into one empire as of old", referring to their attempt to restore the First Bulgarian Empire.

=== Co-ruler ===
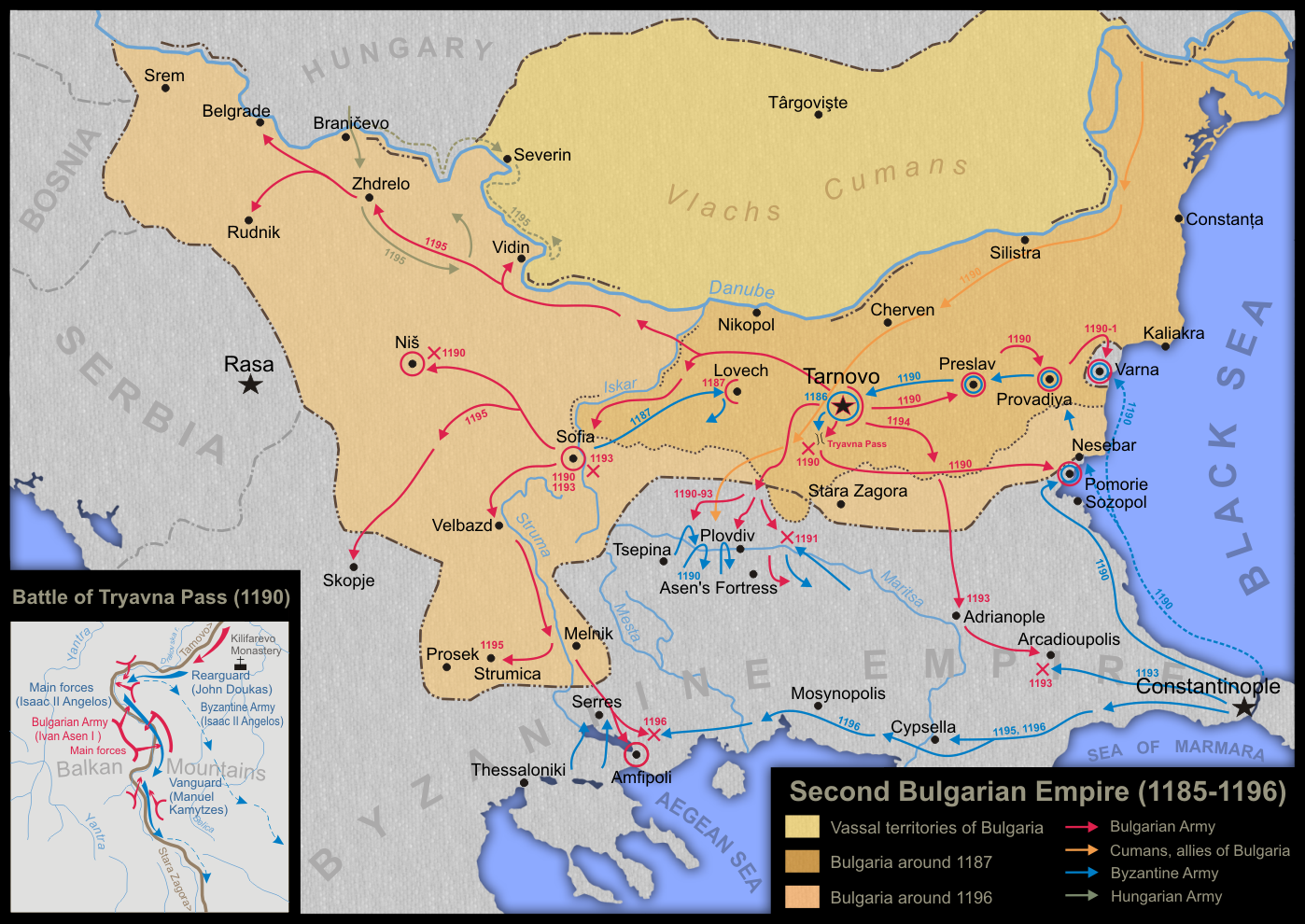
Second Bulgarian Empire from 1185 to 1196, according to a Bulgarian historical atlas. The theory that Bulgaria included Oltenia and Muntenia, as it is presented on the map, is not universally accepted by historians.

Seals bearing the inscription Ivan "basileus" (or emperor) of the Bulgarians were found in Constantinople and other places. According to George Akropolites, "Asen ruled over the Bulgarian race as emperor for nine years" before he died in 1196. This suggests Asen became his brother's co-ruler in 1187 or 1188. The Byzantines launched a series of unsuccessful campaigns against the rebellious Bulgarians and Vlachs, but they could not prevent Peter and Asen from securing their rule in Paristrion. Isaac II personally led his troops against the brothers' realm and laid siege to Lovech in the spring of 1188. Although he could not occupy the fortress, the Byzantines captured Asen's wife, Helen, and his younger brother, Kaloyan. He was held hostage in Constantinople for years.

The arrival of the crusader army of the Holy Roman Emperor, Frederick Barbarossa, in the Balkan Peninsula in July 1189 enabled Peter and Asen to occupy new territories of the Byzantine Empire. One of the chronicles of Barbarossa's crusade, The History of the Expedition of the Emperor Frederick, explicitly mentions that they seized "the region where the Danube flows into the sea" (present-day Dobruja) and parts of Thrace. When writing of the negotiations between Barbarossa and the brothers' envoys during the march of the crusaders across the Balkans, primary sources mention only Peter, suggesting he was regarded as the senior ruler of Bulgaria. The crusaders left the Balkans for Asia Minor in March 1190.

Shortly after the crusaders' departure, Isaac II Angelos moved into the lands under the rule of Peter and Asen. He could not defeat the Vlachs and Bulgarians, because they avoided a pitched battle, forcing the Emperor to start to retreat. The imperial army was ambushed and defeated at a mountain pass. The victorious Vlachs and Bulgarians, along with their Cuman allies, launched new raids against Thrace, pillaging Anchialus and other towns. Isaac II defeated the Cumans near Adrianople in April 1191. Thereafter his cousin, Constantine Angelos Doukas, routed Peter and Asen's troops in a series of battles.

A eulogy delivered in praise of Isaac II in 1193 referred to Asen as a "reckless and obdurate rebel", surrounded by "imperial traps", while describing Peter as a "stumbling block" and an "adverse wind" to his brother. The speech shows, Byzantine intrigues stirred up a conflict between the brothers in 1192. Madgearu says, Peter was allegedly willing to make peace with the Byzantines, but Asen wanted to continue the war. Akropolites knew that Peter moved from Tarnovo to Preslav at an unspecified date, a region known as "Peter's land" even in the 13th century. Historians Madgearu and Paul Stephenson agree, the sources provide evidence the brothers divided their realm around 1192, with Asen retaining Tarnovo and its region.

After Constantine Angelos Doukas was blinded during the rebellion against Isaac II, the Vlachs and the Bulgarians resumed their attacks against the Byzantine Empire. The Emperor dispatched Alexios Gidos and Basil Vatatzes to wage war against the invaders, but their united armies were almost annihilated in the Battle of Arcadiopolis. Peter and Asen conquered new territories in Thrace, including Philippopolis.

Isaac II decided to launch a new campaign to recover Thrace himself. While he was mustering his troops at Kypsela, his brother, Alexios, captured and blinded him on 8 April 1195. Alexios III sent envoys to Peter and Asen, proposing to make peace with them. The brothers refused the new emperor's proposal. Asen moved into Byzantine territory and defeated Alexios Aspietes. He captured the Byzantine fortresses along the River Struma leaving Vlach and Bulgarian troops to garrison them.

A new Byzantine army, under the command of the Emperor's son-in-law, Isaac Komnenos, launched a counterinvasion. Asen's Vlach, Bulgarian and Cuman troops surrounded the invaders and defeated them near Serres. Komnenos was captured by a Cuman warrior who secretly tried to hold him to ask for a huge ransom from the Emperor. When Asen was informed of Komnenos's capture, he ordered the Cuman to hand over his captive.

=== Death ===
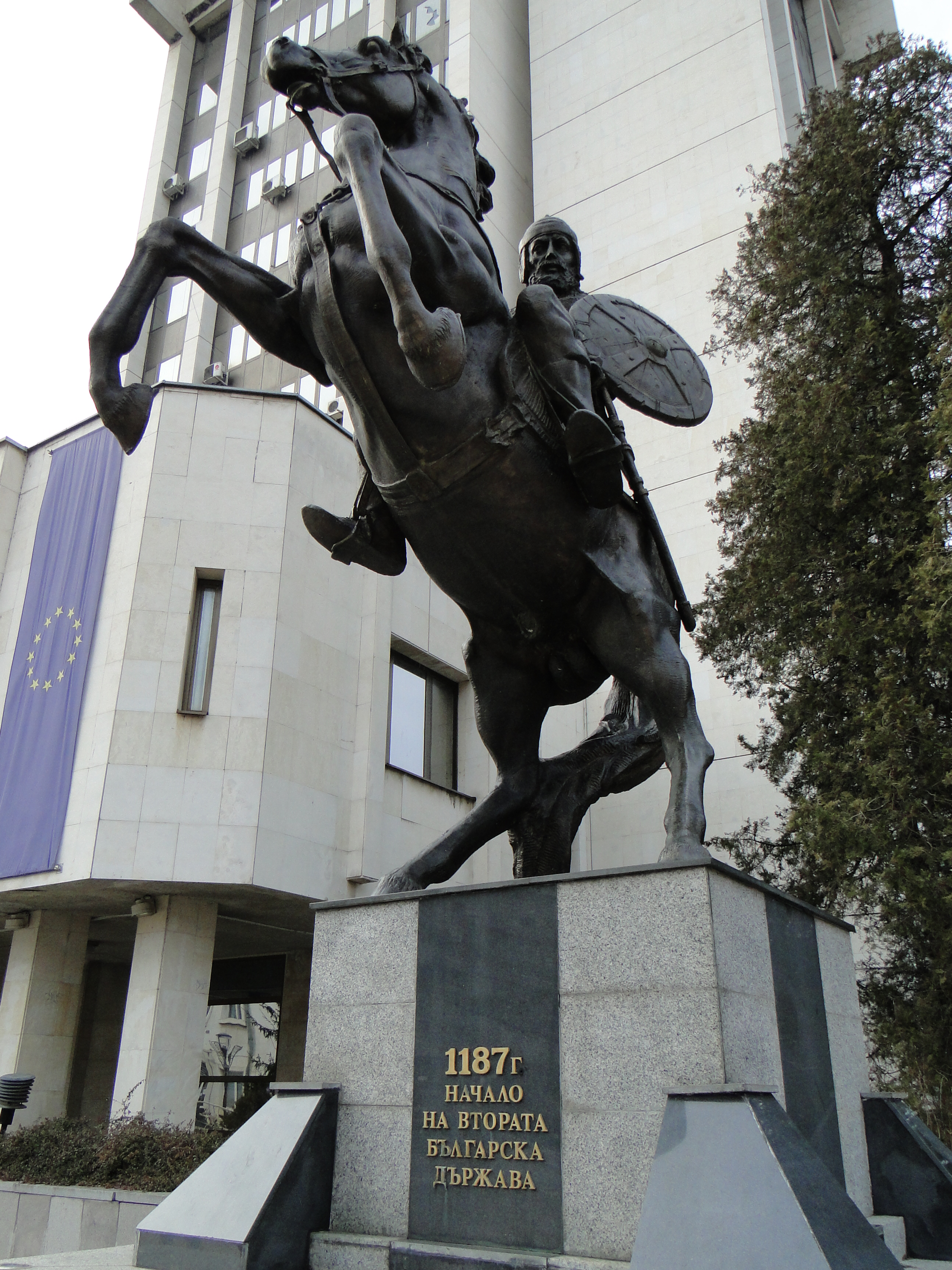
Statue of Ivan Asen I in Lovech

A boyar Ivanko stabbed Asen in 1196, but the motive for this act is uncertain. Choniates, who narrated the events, recorded two versions. According to one account, the captive Isaac Komnenos persuaded Ivanko to kill the Tsar, promising to give his daughter in marriage to him. The second version claims, Ivanko had "clandestine sexual relations with the sister of Asen's wife", but their affair was revealed to Asen. He decided to have his sister-in-law executed for the illicit love affair which insulted his family, but his wife persuaded him to punish Ivanko instead of her sister. Asen ordered Ivanko to come to his tent late at night. Ivanko who had been informed about the tsar's decision came with a sword hidden under his garments. He killed Asen during the meeting.

Choniates stated, Ivanko wanted to rule "more justly and equitably" than Asen who had "governed everything by the sword". Stephenson concludes, Choniates' words show that Asen had introduced a "reign of terror", intimidating his subjects with the assistance of Cuman mercenaries. Vásáry, however, says the Byzantines encouraged Ivanko to kill Asen. Ivanko attempted to assume control in Tarnovo with Byzantine support, but Peter forced him to flee to the Byzantine Empire. Peter charged Kaloyan with the governing of Asen's realm.

== Family ==
Asen fathered at least two sons, Ivan Asen and Alexander. Ivan Asen, who was born around 1193, became the emperor of Bulgaria in 1218. His younger brother, Alexander, bore the title sebastokrator during Ivan Asen II's reign.

== See also ==
- Asen Peak

== Sources ==
=== Primary sources ===
- George Akropolites: The History (Translated with and Introduction and Commentary by Ruth Macrides) (2007). Oxford University Press. ISBN 9780199210671.
- O City of Byzantium, Annals of Niketas Choniatēs (Translated by Harry J. Magoulias) (1984). Wayne State University Press. ISBN 9780814317648.
- The Conquest of Constantinople: Robert of Clari (Translated with introduction and notes by Edgar Holmes McNeal) (1996). Columbia University Press. ISBN 0802078230.
- "The History of the Expedition of the Emperor Frederick". In The Crusade of Frederick Barbarossa: The History of the Expedition of the Emperor Frederick and Related Texts (Translated by G. A. Loud) (2013). Ashgate Publishing. pp. 33–134. ISBN 9781472413963.

=== Secondary sources ===
- Chary, Frederick B. (2011). The History of Bulgaria. Greenwood. ISBN 9780313384479.
- Curta, Florin (2006). Southeastern Europe in the Middle Ages, 500–1250. Cambridge University Press. ISBN 9780521815390. "Southeastern Europe in the Middle Ages, 500–1250."
- Dall'Aglio, Francesco (2013). "The interaction between nomadic and sedentary peoples on the Lower Danube: the Cumans and the "Second Bulgarian Empire"". In Curta, Florin; Maleon, Bogdan–Petru (eds.). The Steppe Lands and the World Beyond Them: Studies in Honor of Victor Spinei on his 70th Birthday. Editura Universității "Alexandru Ian Cuza". pp. 299–313. ISBN 9789737039330.
- Fine, John V. A. (1994). The Late Medieval Balkans: A Critical Survey from the Late Twelfth Century to the Ottoman Conquest. The University of Michigan Press. ISBN 0472082604.
- Madgearu, Alexandru (2017). The Asanids: The Political and Military History of the Second Bulgarian Empire, 1185–1280. Brill Publishers. ISBN 9789004325012.
- Petkov, Kiril (2008). The Voices of Medieval Bulgaria, Seventh-Fifteenth Century: The Records of a Bygone Culture. Brill Publishers. ISBN 9789004168312.
- Simpson, Alicia (2016). "Byzantium's Retreating Balkan Frontiers during the reign of the Angeloi (1185–1203): A Reconsideration". In Stanković, Vlada (ed.). The Balkans and the Byzantine World before and after the Captures of Constantinople, 1204 and 1453. Lexington Books. pp. 3–22. ISBN 9781498513258.
- Stephenson, Paul (2000). Byzantium's Balkan Frontier: A Political Study of the Northern Balkans, 900–1204. Cambridge University Press. ISBN 9780521027564.
- Treadgold, Warren (1997). A History of the Byzantine State and Society. Stanford University Press. ISBN 0804726302.
- Vásáry, István (2005). Cumans and Tatars: Oriental Military in the Pre-Ottoman Balkans, 1185–1365. Cambridge University Press. ISBN 0521837561.

Ivan Asen I Asen dynasty Died: 1196
Regnal titles
Preceded by Peter II	Emperor of Bulgaria; 1187/1188–1196 with Peter II	Succeeded by Kaloyan
