= Kaloyan of Bulgaria =

Emperor of Bulgaria from 1196 to 1207

Kaloyan Калоян

Tsar of Bulgaria; together with Peter II (1196 – 1197)
- Reign: 1196 – 1207
- Coronation: 1196
- Predecessor: Ivan Asen I
- Successor: Boril

King of the Bulgarians and Vlachs
- Reign: 1204 – 1207
- Coronation: 8 November 1204
- Born: c. 1170
- Died: October 1207; Thessalonica
- Spouse: Anna of Cumania
- Issue: Maria
- Dynasty: Asen dynasty

Kaloyan or Kalojan, also known as Ivan I, Ioannitsa or Johannitsa (Bulgarian: Калоян, Йоаница; c. 1170 – October 1207), the Roman-Slayer, was emperor or tsar of Bulgaria from 1196 to 1207. He was the younger brother of Theodor and Asen, who led the anti-Byzantine uprising of the Bulgarians and Vlachs in 1185. The uprising ended with the restoration of Bulgaria as an independent state. He spent a few years as a hostage in Constantinople in the late 1180s. Theodor, crowned Emperor Peter II, made him his co-ruler after Asen was murdered in 1196. A year later, Peter was also murdered, and Kaloyan became the sole ruler of Bulgaria.

After the successful siege of Varna in 1201 against the Byzantine Empire, the defenders and governors of the city were tied and thrown into the moat of the fortress walls and covered with dirt by the Bulgarians. After they were buried alive in this way, Kaloyan declared himself a Bulgarian avenger, adopting the moniker "the Romanslayer" by analogy with the emperor Basil II the Bulgar Slayer, who defeated and blinded a Bulgarian army of 15,000 people.

To obtain an imperial title from the Holy See, Kaloyan entered into correspondence with Pope Innocent III, offering to acknowledge papal primacy. His expansionist policy brought him into conflict with the Byzantine Empire, Hungary, and Serbia. In 1204, King Emeric of Hungary allowed the papal legate who was to deliver a royal crown to Kaloyan to enter Bulgaria only at the Pope's demand. The legate crowned Kaloyan "king of the Bulgarians and Vlachs" on 8 November 1204, but Kaloyan continued to style himself as tsar (emperor).

Kaloyan took advantage of the disintegration of the Byzantine Empire after the fall of Constantinople to the Crusaders or "Latins" in 1204. He captured fortresses in the themes of Macedonia and Thrace and supported the local population's riots against the Crusaders. He defeated Baldwin I, Latin Emperor of Constantinople, in the Battle of Adrianople on 14 April 1205. Baldwin was captured and later died in Kaloyan's prison. Kaloyan launched new campaigns against the Crusaders and Romans, destroying dozens of fortresses. He died under mysterious circumstances during the siege of Thessalonica in 1207.

== Early life ==
Kaloyan was the younger brother of Theodor and Asen, noted as the instigators of the uprising of the Bulgarians and Vlachs against the Byzantine Empire in 1185. Theodor was crowned emperor and adopted the name Peter in 1185. Asen became Peter's co-ruler before 1190. They secured the independence of their realm with the assistance of Cuman warriors from the Pontic steppes.

Kaloyan, who was still a teenager in 1188, must have been born around 1170, according to historian Alexandru Madgearu. He was baptised Ivan (or John), but he was called Johannitsa ("Little Ivan") because Ivan was also the baptismal name of his elder brother Asen. Kaloyan derived from the Greek expression for John the Handsome (Kallos Ioannis). His Greek enemies also called him Skyloioannes ("John the Dog"), which gave rise to references to Tsar Skaloyan or Scaluian in frescos in the Dragalevtsi Monastery and the Sucevița Monastery.

After the Byzantines captured Asen's wife, Kaloyan was sent as a hostage to Constantinople in exchange for her in the spring of 1188. The date of his release is not known, or said to be about 1189 when he escaped. He was back in his homeland when a boyar, Ivanko, murdered Asen in Tarnovo in 1196. Ivanko attempted to obtain the throne with Byzantine support, but Theodor-Peter forced him to flee to the Byzantine Empire.

== Reign ==
=== Conflicts with the Byzantine Empire ===
The Byzantine historian Niketas Choniates mentioned that Theodor-Peter designated Kaloyan "to assist him in his labors and share in his rule" at an unspecified time. Kaloyan became the sole ruler of Bulgaria after Theodor-Peter was murdered in 1197. Shortly afterwards he attacked the Byzantine province of Thrace and launched frequent raids against it during the following months. Around this time, he sent a letter to Pope Innocent III, urging him to dispatch an envoy to Bulgaria. He wanted to persuade the pope to acknowledge his rule in Bulgaria. Innocent eagerly entered into correspondence with Kaloyan because the reunification of the Christian denominations under his authority was one of his principal objectives.

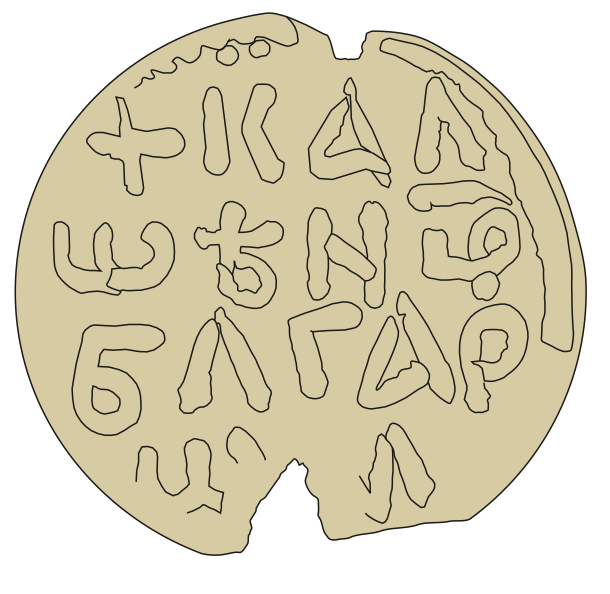
Kaloyan's leaden seal with the Bulgarian inscription "Kaloyan Tsar of the Bulgarians"

The Byzantine Emperor Alexios III Angelos made Ivanko the commander of Philippopolis (now Plovdiv in Bulgaria). Ivanko seized two fortresses in the Rhodopi Mountains from Kaloyan, but by 1198 he had made an alliance with him. Cumans and Vlachs from the lands to the north of the river Danube broke into the Byzantine Empire in the spring and autumn of 1199. Choniates, who recorded these events, did not mention that Kaloyan cooperated with the invaders, so it is likely that they crossed Bulgaria without his authorization. Kaloyan captured Braničevo, Velbuzhd (now Kyustendil in Bulgaria), Skopje and Prizren from the Byzantines, most probably in that year, according to historian Alexandru Madgearu.

Innocent III's envoy arrived in Bulgaria in late December 1199, bringing a letter from the Pope to Kaloyan. Innocent stated that he was informed that Kaloyan's forefathers had come "from the City of Rome". Kaloyan's answer, written in Old Church Slavonic, has not been preserved, but its content can be reconstructed based on his later correspondence with the Holy See. Kaloyan styled himself "Emperor of the Bulgarians and Vlachs", and asserted that he was the legitimate successor of the rulers of the First Bulgarian Empire. He demanded an imperial crown from the Pope and expressed his wish to put the Bulgarian Orthodox Church under the pope's jurisdiction.

The Byzantines captured Ivanko and occupied his lands in 1200. Kaloyan and his Cuman allies launched a new campaign against Byzantine territories in March 1201. He destroyed Constantia (now Simeonovgrad in Bulgaria) and captured Varna. He also supported the rebellion of Dobromir Chrysos and Manuel Kamytzes against Alexios III, but they were both defeated. Roman Mstislavich, prince of Halych and Volhynia, invaded the Cumans' territories, forcing them to return to their homeland in 1201. After the Cuman's retreat, Kaloyan concluded a peace treaty with Alexios III and withdrew his troops from Thrace in late 1201 or in 1202. According to Kaloyan's letter to the Pope, Alexios III was also willing to send an imperial crown to him and to acknowledge the autocephalous (or autonomous) status of the Bulgarian Church.

=== Imperial ambitions ===
Vukan Nemanjić, ruler of Zeta, expelled his brother, Stefan, from Serbia in 1202. Kaloyan gave shelter to Stefan and allowed the Cumans to invade Serbia across Bulgaria. He invaded Serbia himself and captured Niš in the summer of 1203. According to Madgearu he also seized Dobromir Chrysos's realm, including its capital at Prosek. Emeric, King of Hungary, who claimed Belgrade, Braničevo and Niš, intervened in the conflict on Vukan's behalf. The Hungarian army occupied territories which were also claimed by Kaloyan. Since Vukan had already acknowledged papal primacy, Innocent III urged Kaloyan to make peace with him in September. In the same month, the papal legate, John of Casamari, gave a pallium to Basil I, the head of the Bulgarian Church, confirming his rank of archbishop, but denying his elevation to the rank of patriarch.

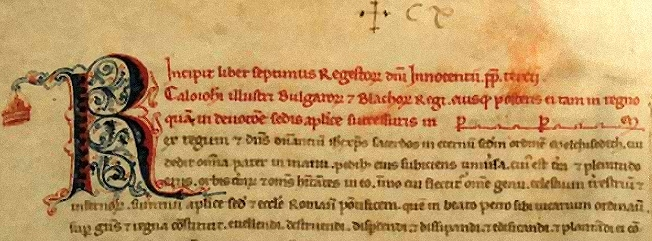
Pope Innocent III's letter to Kaloyan

Dissatisfied with the Pope's decision, Kaloyan sent a new letter to Rome, asking Innocent to send cardinals who could crown him emperor. He also informed the Pope that Emeric of Hungary had seized five Bulgarian bishoprics, asking Innocent to arbitrate in the dispute and determine the boundary between Bulgaria and Hungary. In the letter, he styled himself the "Emperor of the Bulgarians". The Pope did not accept Kaloyan's claim to an imperial crown, but dispatched Cardinal Leo Brancaleoni to Bulgaria in early 1204 to crown him king.

Kaloyan sent envoys to the crusaders who were besieging Constantinople, offering military support to them if "they would crown him king so that he would be lord of his land of Vlachia", according to Robert of Clari's chronicle. However, the crusaders treated him with disdain and did not accept his offer. The crusaders captured Constantinople on 13 April. They elected Baldwin IX of Flanders emperor and agreed to divide the Byzantine Empire among themselves.

The papal legate, Brancaleoni, travelled through Hungary, but he was arrested at Keve (now Kovin in Serbia) on the Hungarian–Bulgarian frontier. Emeric of Hungary urged the cardinal to summon Kaloyan to Hungary and to arbitrate in their conflict. Brancaleoni was only released at the Pope's demand in late September or early October. He consecrated Basil primate of the Church of the Bulgarians and Vlachs on 7 November. Next day, Brancaleone crowned Kaloyan king. In his subsequent letter to the Pope, Kaloyan styled himself as "King of Bulgaria and Vlachia", but referred to his realm as an empire and to Basil as a patriarch.

=== War with the Crusaders ===
Taking advantage of the disintegration of the Byzantine Empire, Kaloyan captured former Byzantine territories in Thrace. Initially he attempted to secure a peaceful division of the lands with the crusaders (or "Latins"). He asked Innocent III to prevent them from attacking Bulgaria. However, the crusaders wanted to implement their treaty which divided the Byzantine territories between them, including lands that Kaloyan claimed.

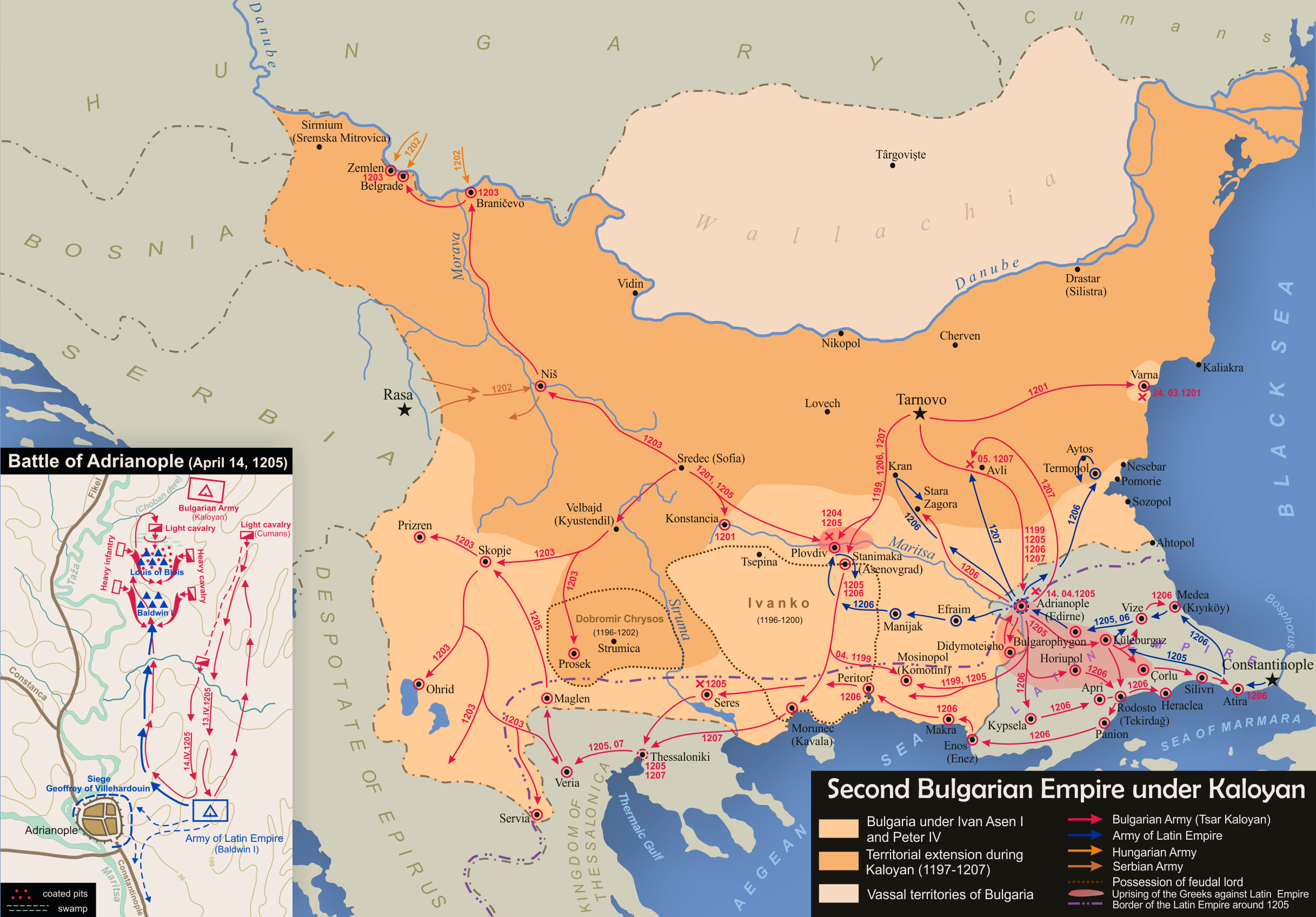
Campaigns of Kaloyan

Kaloyan gave shelter to Byzantine refugees and persuaded them to stir up riots in Thrace and Macedonia against the Latins. The refugees, according to Robert of Clari's account, also pledged they would elect him emperor if he invaded the Latin Empire. The Greek burghers of Adrianople (now Edirne in Turkey) and nearby towns rose up against the Latins in early 1205. Kaloyan promised that he would send them reinforcements before Easter. Considering Kaloyan's cooperation with the rebels a dangerous alliance, Emperor Baldwin decided to launch a counter-attack and ordered the withdrawal of his troops from Asia Minor. He laid siege to Adrianople before he could muster all his troops. Kaloyan hurried to the town at the head of an army of more than 14,000 Bulgarian, Vlach and Cuman warriors. A feigned retreat by the Cumans drew the heavy cavalry of the crusaders into an ambush in the marshes north of Adrianople, enabling Kaloyan to inflict a crushing defeat on them on 14 April 1205.

Baldwin was captured on the battlefield and died in captivity in Tarnovo. Choniates accused Kaloyan of having tortured and murdered Baldwin because he "seethed with anger" against the crusaders. George Akropolites added that Baldwin's head was "cleaned of all its contents and decorated all round with ornaments" to be used as a goblet by Kaloyan. On the other hand, Baldwin's brother and successor, Henry, informed the pope that Kaloyan behaved respectfully towards the crusaders who had been captured at Adrianople.

Kaloyan's troops pillaged Thrace and Macedonia after his victory over the Latins. He launched a campaign against the Kingdom of Thessalonica, laying siege to Serres in late May. He promised free passage to the defenders, but after their surrender he broke his word and took them captive. He continued the campaign and seized Veria and Moglena (now Almopia in Greece). Most inhabitants of Veria were murdered or captured on his orders. Henry (who still ruled the Latin Empire as regent) launched a counter-invasion against Bulgaria in June. He could not capture Adrianople and a sudden flood forced him to lift the siege of Didymoteicho.

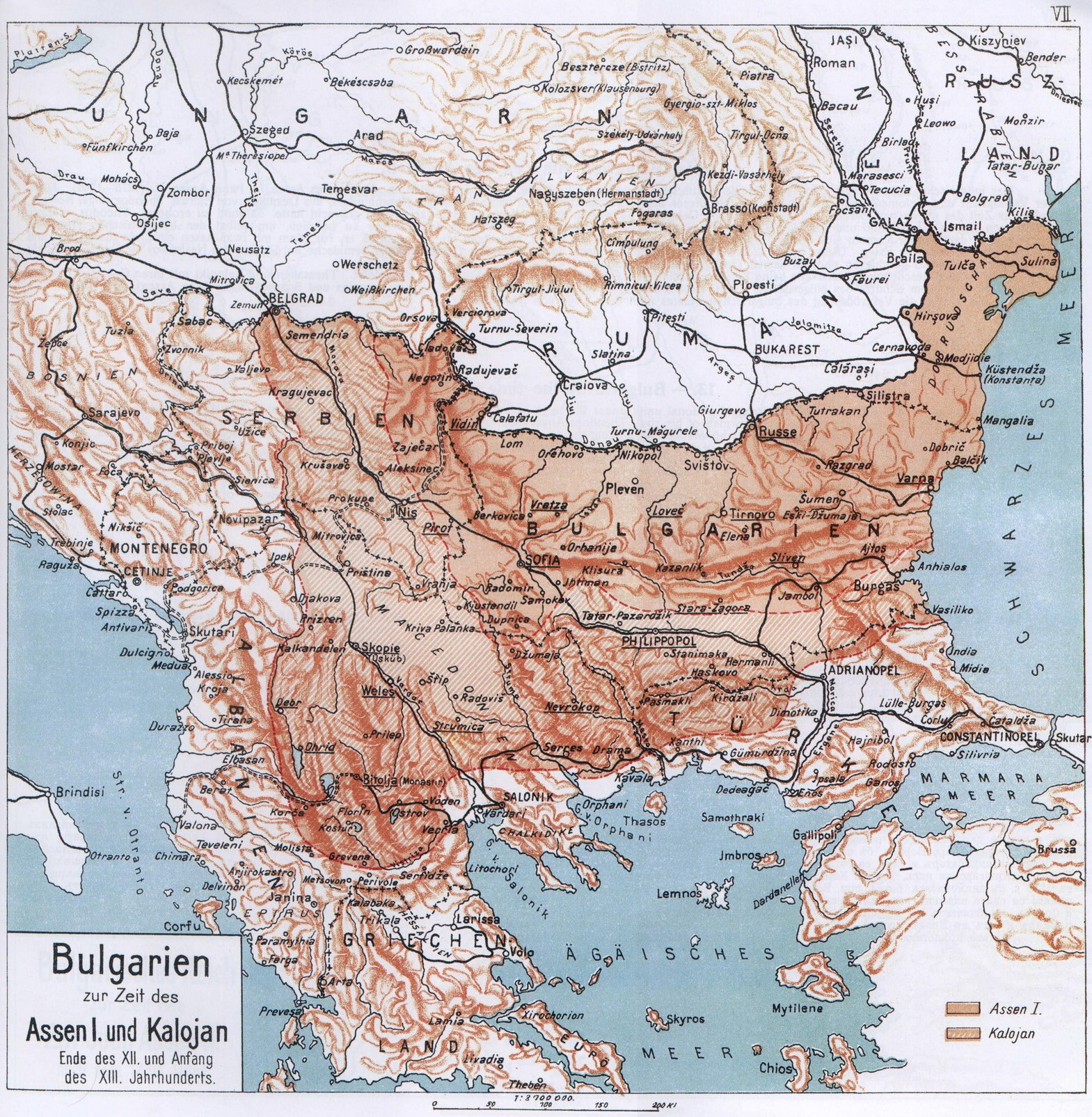
Bulgaria under Kaloyan (1197–1207)

Kaloyan decided to take vengeance of the townspeople of Philippopolis, who had voluntarily cooperated with the crusaders. With the assistance of the local Paulicians, he seized the town and ordered the murder of the most prominent burghers. The commoners were delivered in chains to Vlachia (a loosely defined territory, located to the south of the lower Danube). He returned to Tarnovo after a riot had broken out against him in the second half of 1205 or early 1206. He "subjected the rebels to harsh punishments and novel methods of execution", according to Choniates. He again invaded Thrace in January 1206. He captured Rousion (now Keşan in Turkey) and massacred its Latin garrison. He then destroyed most of the fortresses along the Via Egnatia, as far as Athira (present-day Büyükçekmece in Turkey). The local inhabitants were captured and forcibly relocated to the lower Danube. Akropolites recorded that thereafter Kaloyan called himself "Romanslayer", with a clear reference to Basil II who had been known as the "Bulgarslayer" after his destruction of the First Bulgarian Empire.

The massacre and capture of their compatriots outraged the Greeks in Thrace and Macedonia. They realized that Kaloyan was more hostile to them than the Latins. The burghers of Adrianople and Didymoteicho approached Henry offering their submission. Henry accepted the offer and assisted Theodore Branas in taking possession of the two towns. Kaloyan attacked Didymoteicho in June, but the crusaders forced him to lift the siege. Soon after Henry was crowned emperor on 20 August, Kaloyan returned and destroyed Didymoteicho. He then laid siege to Adrianople, but Henry forced him to withdraw his troops from Thrace. Henry also broke into Bulgaria and released 20,000 prisoners in October. Boniface, King of Thessalonica, had meanwhile recaptured Serres.

Kaloyan concluded an alliance with Theodore I Laskaris, Emperor of Nicaea. Laskaris had started a war against David Komnenos, Emperor of Trebizond, who was supported by the Latins. He persuaded Kaloyan to invade Thrace, forcing Henry to withdraw his troops from Asia Minor. Kaloyan laid siege to Adrianople in April 1207, using trebuchets, but the defenders resisted. A month later, the Cumans abandoned Kaloyan's camp, because they wanted to return to the Pontic steppes, which compelled Kaloyan to lift the siege. Innocent III urged Kaloyan to make peace with the Latins, but he did not obey.

Henry concluded a truce with Laskaris in July 1207. He also had a meeting with Boniface of Thessalonica, who acknowledged his suzerainty at Kypsela in Thrace. However, on his way back to Thessalonica, Boniface was ambushed and killed at Mosynopolis on 4 September. According to Geoffrey of Villehardouin local Bulgarians were the perpetrators and they sent Boniface's head to Kaloyan. Robert of Clari and Choniates recorded that Kaloyan had set up the ambush. Boniface was succeeded by his minor son, Demetrius. The child king's mother, Margaret of Hungary, took up the administration of the kingdom. Kaloyan hurried to Thessalonica and laid siege to the town.

== Death ==
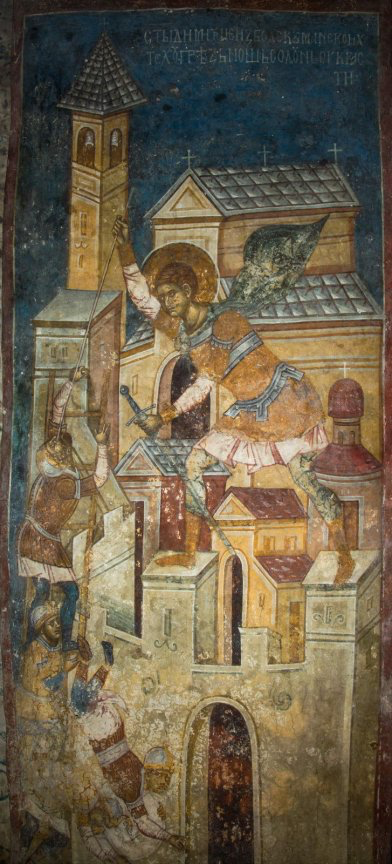
Saint Demetrius defending Thessalonica from the invasion led by Kaloyan. Fresco in the Visoki Dečani Monastery.

Kaloyan died during the siege of Thessalonica in October 1207, but the circumstances of his death are uncertain. Historian Akropolites (1217/20-1282) stated that he died of pleurisy. He also recorded a rumour claiming that Kaloyan's "death was caused by divine wrath; for it seemed to him that an armed man appeared before him in his sleep and struck his side with a spear".

Legends about Saint Demetrius of Thessalonica's intervention on behalf of the besieged town were recorded shortly after Kaloyan's death. Robert of Clari wrote before 1216 that the saint himself came to Kaloyan's tent and "struck him with a lance through the body", causing his death. Stefan Nemanjić wrote down the same legend in 1216 in his hagiography of his father, Stefan Nemanja. John Staurakios, who compiled the legends of Saint Demetrius in the late 13th century, recorded that a man riding on a white horse struck Kaloyan with a lance. Kaloyan, continued Staurakios, associated the attacker with Manastras, the commander of his mercenaries, who thus had to flee before Kaloyan's death. The legend was depicted on the walls of more than five Orthodox churches and monasteries. For instance, a fresco in the Dečani Monastery depicts Saint Demetrius slaying Tsar Skaloyan.

The contradictory records of Kaloyan's death gave rise to multiple scholarly theories, many of them accepting that he was murdered. Madgearu says Kaloyan was actually murdered by Manastras, who had most probably been hired by Kaloyan's wife and nephew, Boril. Historians Genoveva Cankova-Petkova and Francesco Dall'Aglia also write that Manastras killed Kaloyan, but they assume that the Greeks had persuaded him to turn against the tsar.

== Grave ==
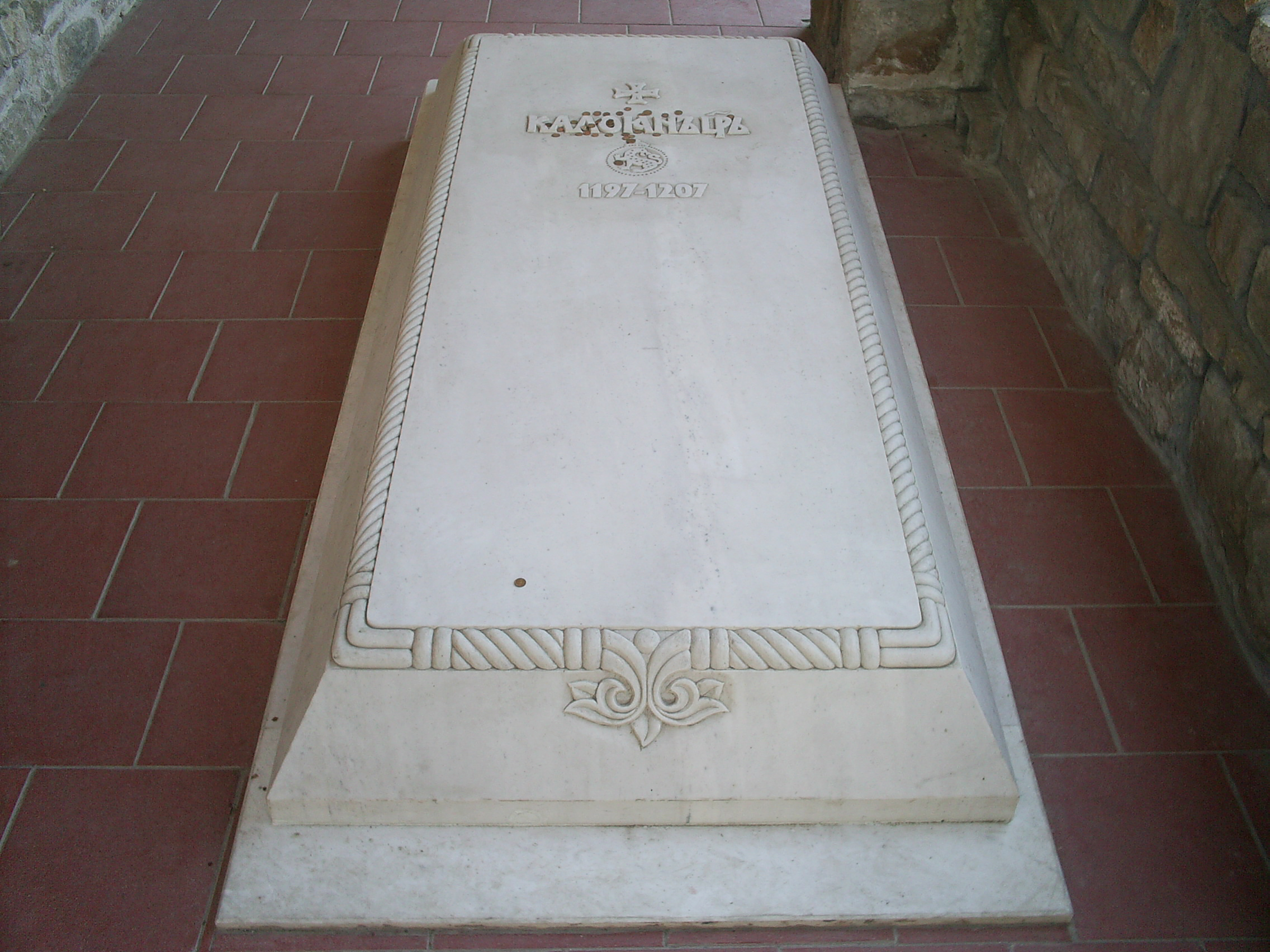
Kaloyan's supposed grave in the Church of the Holy Forty Martyrs in Tarnovo

The location of Kaloyan's grave is unknown. According to the late 13th-century version of the Life of Saint Sava of Serbia, Kaloyan's body was embalmed and delivered to Tarnovo. However, the older version of the same legend, recorded in 1254, does not mention this episode. A golden ring, which was found in a grave near the Church of the Holy Forty Martyrs in Tarnovo in 1972, bears the Cyrillic inscription Kaloianov prăsten ("Kaloyan's ring"). Historian Ivan Dujčev stated that the ring proved that Kaloyan's remains were transferred to the church, which was built in 1230. The identification of the grave as Kaloyan's burial place is controversial, because the ring bearing his name cannot be dated to before the 14th century. Furthermore, the graves of all other royals who were buried in the same place are located within the church, suggesting that the ring was not owned by Kaloyan, but by one of his 14th-century namesakes.

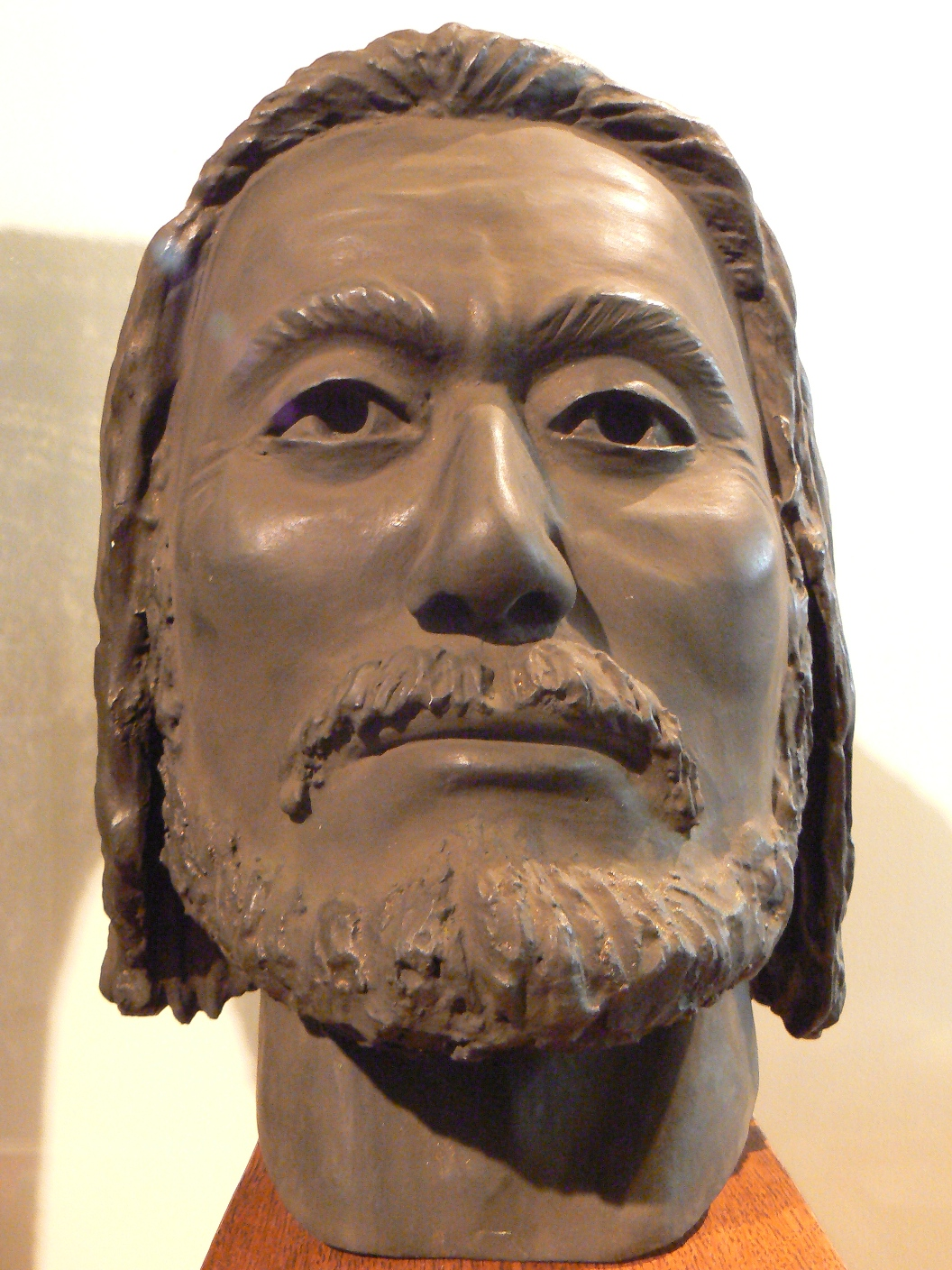
Facial reconstruction based on the skull found near Holy Forty Martyrs Church. The identification of the skull is disputed.

Based on the skull found in the same grave and associated with Kaloyan, anthropologist Jordan Jordanov reconstructed Kaloyan's face.

== Family ==
Kaloyan's wife was a Cuman princess. She gave birth to Kaloyan's only known daughter (whose name is unknown). According to gossip recorded by Alberic of Trois-Fontaines, Kaloyan's wife tried to seduce the Latin Emperor Baldwin who had been imprisoned in Tarnovo. However, the gossip continued, Baldwin refused her, for which she accused him of having tried to seduce her. Outraged by his wife's claim, Kaloyan had Baldwin executed and fed his corpse to the dogs. Based on the story of Potiphar and his wife, the rumour is obviously unreliable, according to Madgearu. After Kaloyan's death, his widow married his successor, Boril. Boril gave Kaloyan's daughter in marriage to the Latin Emperor Henry in 1211.

== See also ==
- Kaloyan Nunatak

== Sources ==
=== Primary sources ===
- George Akropolites: The History (Translated with and Introduction and Commentary by Ruth Macrides) (2007). Oxford University Press. ISBN 978-0-19-921067-1.
- O City of Byzantium, Annals of Niketas Choniatēs (Translated by Harry J. Magoulias) (1984). Wayne State University Press. ISBN 978-0-8143-1764-8.
- The Conquest of Constantinople: Robert of Clari (Translated with introduction and notes by Edgar Holmes McNeal) (1996). Columbia University Press. ISBN 0-8020-7823-0.

=== Secondary sources ===
- Curta, Florin (2006). Southeastern Europe in the Middle Ages, 500–1250. Cambridge University Press. ISBN 978-0-521-89452-4.
- Detrez, Raymond (2015). Historical Dictionary of Bulgaria. Rowman & Littlefield. ISBN 978-1-4422-4179-4.
- Dimnik, Martin (2004). "Kievan Rus', the Bulgars and the southern Slavs, c. 1020–c. 1200". In Luscombe, David; Riley-Smith, Jonathan (eds.). The New Cambridge Medieval History, Volume 4, c.1024–c.1198, Part 2. Cambridge: Cambridge University Press. pp. 254–276. ISBN 978-1-13905403-4.
- Fine, John V. A. (1994) [1987]. The Late Medieval Balkans: A Critical Survey from the Late Twelfth Century to the Ottoman Conquest. Ann Arbor, Michigan: University of Michigan Press. ISBN 978-0-472-10079-8.
- Lock, Peter (1995). The Franks in the Aegean, 1204–1500. Longman. ISBN 0-582-05140-1.
- Madgearu, Alexandru (2016). The Asanids: The Political and Military History of the Second Bulgarian Empire, 1185–1280. BRILL. ISBN 978-9-004-32501-2.
- Mladjov, Ian (2015). "Monarchs' Names and Numbering in the Second Bulgarian State". Studia Ceranea. 5: 267–310. doi:10.18778/2084-140X.05.09. hdl:11089/18406. ISSN 2449-8378.
- Stephenson, Paul (2000). Byzantium's Balkan Frontier: A Political Study of the Northern Balkans, 900–1204. Cambridge University Press. ISBN 978-0-521-02756-4.
- Sweeney, James Ross (1973). "Innocent III, Hungary and the Bulgarian Coronation: A Study in Medieval Papal Diplomacy". Church History. 42 (3): 320–334. doi:10.2307/3164389. ISSN 0009-6407. JSTOR 3164389. S2CID 162901328.
- Treadgold, Warren (1997). A History of the Byzantine State and Society. Stanford, California: Stanford University Press. ISBN 0-8047-2630-2.
- Vásáry, István (2005). Cumans and Tatars: Oriental Military in the Pre-Ottoman Balkans, 1185–1365. Cambridge University Press. ISBN 0-521-83756-1.

Kaloyan of Bulgaria Asen dynasty Born: c. 1170 Died: October 1207
Regnal titles
Preceded by Ivan Asen I	Emperor of Bulgaria; 1196–1207 with Peter II	Succeeded by Boril
