= Battle of Tryavna =

1190 battle of the Byzantine–Bulgarian Wars

- Part of the Byzantine–Bulgarian wars
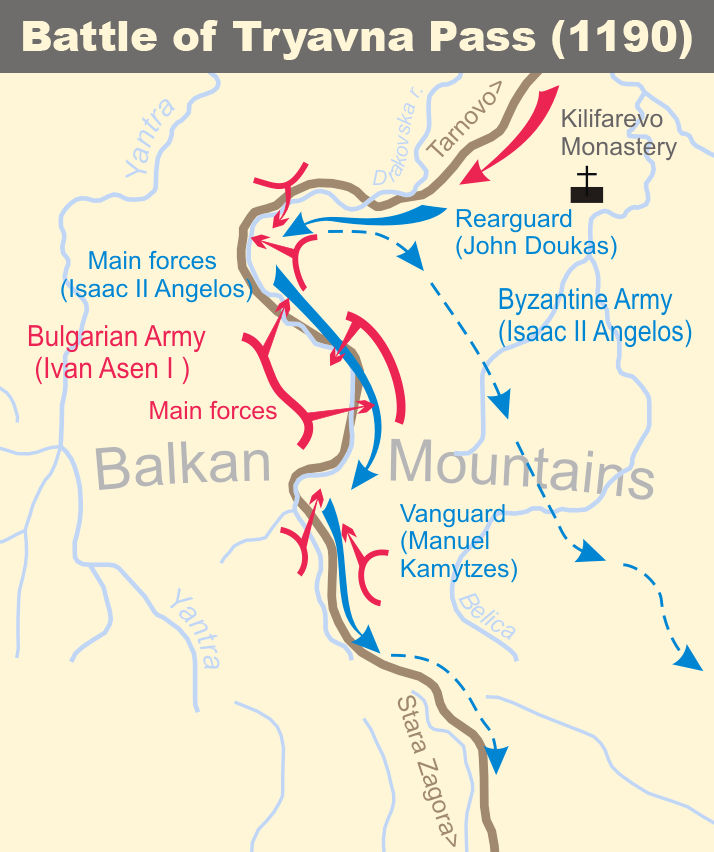
Date	Spring 1190
Location	near Tryavna, Bulgaria 42°57′05.1″N 25°35′51.9″E
Result	Bulgarian victory Full results: Byzantium is losing influence in the Balkans

Belligerents
Bulgarian Empire	Byzantine Empire

Commanders and leaders
Ivan Asen I	Isaac II Angelos; John Doukas; Manuel Kamytzes

Strength
Unknown	Unknown

Casualties and losses
Unknown	Byzantine army was annihilated

The Battle of Tryavna (Bulgarian: Битка при Трявна) occurred in 1190, in the mountains around the contemporary town of Tryavna, central Bulgaria. The result was a Bulgarian victory over the Byzantine Empire, which secured the successes achieved since the beginning of the Rebellion of Asen and Peter in 1185.

== Origins of the conflict ==
After his second campaign in Moesia and the fruitless siege of Lovech in 1187, the Byzantine Emperor Isaac II Angelos was forced to conclude a truce, thus de facto recognizing the independence of Bulgaria. Until 1189, both sides observed the truce. The Bulgarians used this time to further organize their administration and military. When the soldiers of the Third Crusade reached the Bulgarian lands at Niš, Asen and Peter offered to help the Emperor of the Holy Roman Empire, Frederick I Barbarossa, with a force of 40,000 against the Byzantines. However, the relations between the Crusaders and the Byzantines smoothed, and the Bulgarian proposal was evaded.

== The battle ==
The Byzantines prepared a third campaign to avenge the Bulgarian actions. Like the previous two invasions, they managed to overcome the passes of the Balkan Mountains. They made a bluff indicating that they would pass near the sea by Pomorie, but instead headed west and passed through the Rishki Pass to Preslav. The Byzantine army next marched westwards to besiege the capital at Tarnovo. At the same time, the Byzantine fleet reached the Danube to bar the way of Cuman auxiliaries from the northern Bulgarian territories.

The siege of Tarnovo was unsuccessful. The defense of the city was led by Asen himself and the morale of his troops was very high. The Byzantine morale, on the other hand, was quite low for several reasons: the lack of any military success, heavy casualties and particularly the fact that the soldiers' pay was in arrears. This was used by Asen, who sent an agent in the guise of a deserter to the Byzantine camp. The man told Isaac II that, despite the efforts of the Byzantine navy, an enormous Cuman army had passed the river Danube and was heading towards Tarnovo to relieve the siege. The Byzantine Emperor panicked and immediately called for a retreat through the nearest pass.

The Bulgarian Emperor deduced that his opponent would go through the Tryavna Pass. The Byzantine army slowly marched southwards, their troops and baggage train stretching for kilometers. The Bulgarians reached the pass before them and staged an ambush from the heights of a narrow gorge. The Byzantine vanguard concentrated their attack on the centre where the Bulgarian leaders were positioned, but once the two main forces met and hand-to-hand combat ensued, the Bulgarians stationed on the heights showered the Byzantine force below with rocks and arrows. In panic, the Byzantines broke up and began a disorganized retreat, prompting a Bulgarian charge, who slaughtered everyone on their way. Isaac II barely escaped; his guards had to cut a path through their soldiers, enabling their commander's flight from the rout. The Byzantine historian Niketas Choniates wrote that only Isaac Angelos escaped and most of the others perished. Modern scholarship identifies Niketas Choniates's account as the principal surviving contemporary Byzantine narrative of Isaac II's 1190 Bulgarian campaign.

The battle was a major catastrophe for the Byzantines. The victorious army captured the imperial treasure including the golden helmet of the Byzantine Emperors, the crown and the Imperial Cross which was considered the most valuable possession of the Byzantine rulers - a solid gold reliquary containing a piece of the Holy Cross. It was thrown in the river by a Byzantine cleric but was recovered by the Bulgarians. These trophies later became the pride of the Bulgarian Treasure and were carried around the capital, Tarnovo, during official occasions.

== Aftermath ==
The victory was very important for Bulgaria. Up to that moment, the official Emperor was Peter IV, but, after the major successes of his younger brother, he was proclaimed Emperor later that year. Officially, Peter preserved his title and ruled from Preslav, but the state now governed by Ivan Asen I. In the next two years, he conquered many lands to the west and south-west including Sofia and Niš. His troops looted Thrace and the Byzantines were powerless to resist the Bulgarian attacks.
