= Basil Vatatzes =

Byzantine military commander

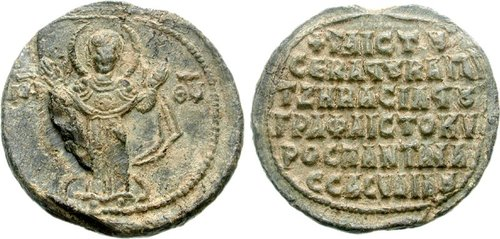
Seal of Basil Vatatzes

Basil Vatatzes (Greek: Βασίλειος Βατάτζης, romanized: Basíleios Vatatzēs, fl. c. 1187–1194) was a Byzantine military commander, and likely the father of the Nicaean emperor John III Doukas Vatatzes.

== Biography ==
=== Origin and early life ===
Vatatzes was of low birth, hailing from the region around Adrianople and Didymoteichon. He likely entered military service under Emperor Manuel I Komnenos (r. 1143–1180), but details of his early life are otherwise unknown. He apparently reached sufficient prominence to be married, around 1187, to an unnamed daughter of Isaac Angelos Doukas, uncle to the emperor Isaac II Angelos (r. 1185–1195, 1203–1204). Married to a cousin of the emperor, Vatatzes suddenly became a member of the senior aristocracy: he was awarded the rank of sebastos, and the path to senior military commands opened to him.

=== Ousting of Theodore Mankaphas ===
His first office after the marriage was likely as military governor (doux) of the small province of Mylasa and Melanoudion, which he is known to have held in August 1189. From there he was promoted to "Grand Domestic of the East" and governor of the extensive Thracesian Theme.

In this capacity he had to deal with the usurper Theodore Mankaphas. Mankaphas had launched a rebellion c. 1188, when he proclaimed himself as emperor in Philadelphia. The revolt was short-lived, as Isaac II besieged the city and forced Mankaphas to submit, but the latter was pardoned and allowed to continue as governor of the city.

In c. 1192/3, however, Basil Vatatzes was sent against Theodore Mankaphas, who had rebelled once more. This time Vataztes effectively ended the rebellion and forced the usurper to flee to the court of the Seljuk Turks at Iconium.

=== Bulgarian rebellion ===
Soon after he was appointed Domestic of the West (as with his contemporary and co-commander, Alexios Gidos, it is unclear if he was a real Grand Domestic or simply Domestic), based at Adrianople. His primary task was to confront the ongoing Bulgarian rebellion in the northern Balkans.

In 1193 he refused any military support to the rebellion of his brother-in-law Constantine Angelos Doukas, a cousin to the emperor and commander of the Byzantine armies in Philippopolis. Doukas proclaimed himself emperor and marched his troops onto Adrianople, but he was betrayed by his followers and surrendered to Isaac II Angelos for a pardon in return.

In 1194 Isaac II ordered Vatatzes and Gidos to campaign against the Bulgarians. The Byzantines were defeated, and Vatatzes was killed at the Battle of Arcadiopolis.

== Family ==
He married a daughter of Isaakios Angelos and was likely the father of John III Doukas Vatatzes, the future Emperor of Nicaea, as well as of John's two older brothers, the sebastokrator Isaac Doukas Vatatzes, and anonymous middle son, whose daughter married the protovestiarios Alexios Raoul.

== Sources ==
- Guilland, Rodolphe (1967). Recherches sur les institutions byzantines [Studies on the Byzantine Institutions]. Berliner byzantinische Arbeiten 35 (in French). Vol. 1. Berlin and Amsterdam: Akademie-Verlag & Adolf M. Hakkert. OCLC 878894516.
- Kazhdan, Alexander, ed. (1991). The Oxford Dictionary of Byzantium. Oxford and New York: Oxford University Press. ISBN 0-19-504652-8.
- Magoulias, Harry J., ed. (1984). O City of Byzantium: Annals of Niketas Choniatēs. Detroit: Wayne State University Press. ISBN 978-0-8143-1764-8.
- Polemis, Demetrios I. (1968). The Doukai: A Contribution to Byzantine Prosopography. London: The Athlone Press.
- Varzos, Konstantinos (1984). Η Γενεαλογία των Κομνηνών [The Genealogy of the Komnenoi] (PDF) (in Greek). Vol. B. Thessaloniki: Centre for Byzantine Studies, University of Thessaloniki.
