= Uprising of Asen and Peter =

1185 uprising against Byzantine rule in the eastern Balkans

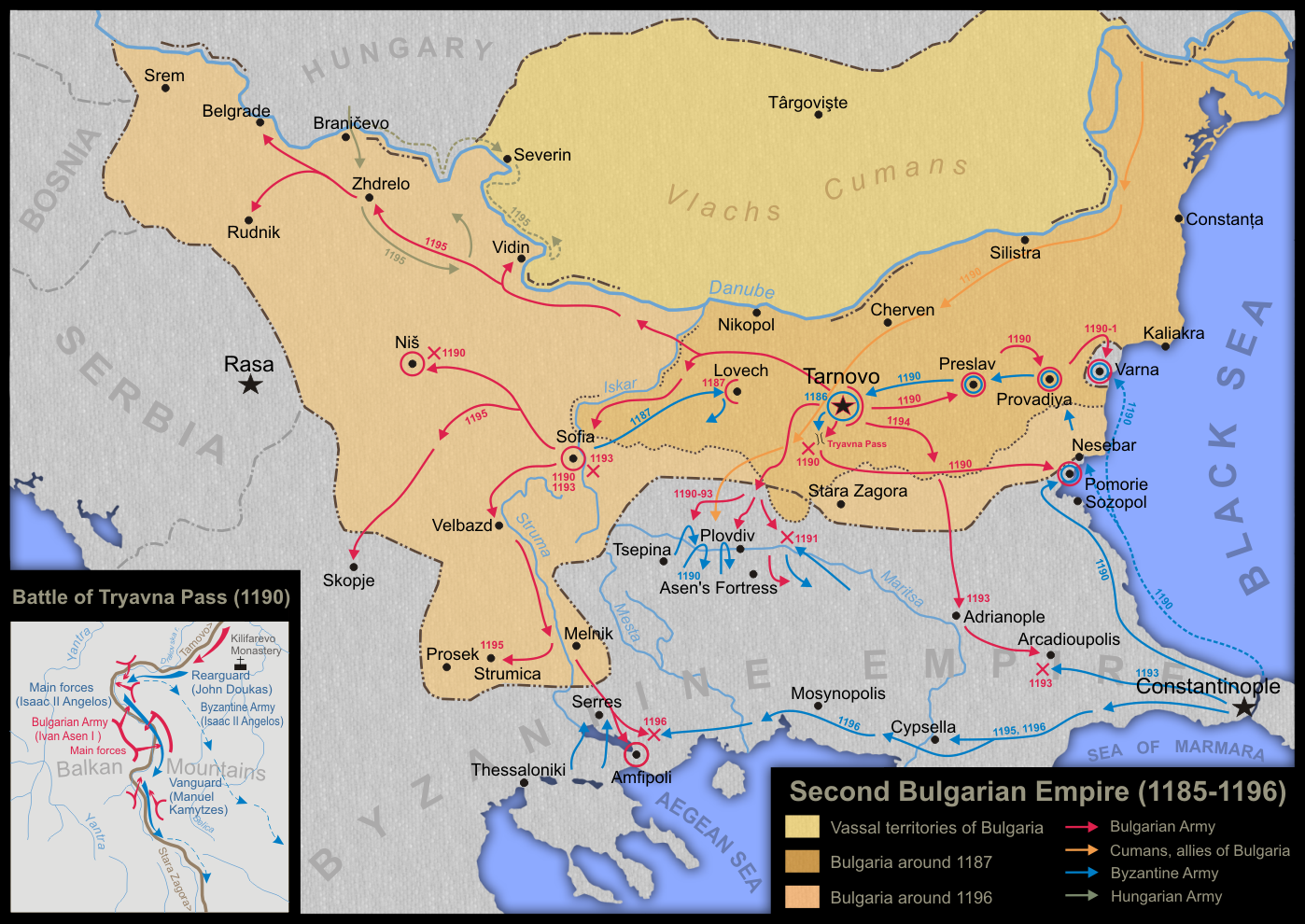
- Bulgaria during the uprising
| Date | 1185 – 1187 |
| Location | Balkan Peninsula |
| Result | Bulgarian-Vlach victory |
| Territorial changes | Recognition of the Second Bulgarian Empire |

Belligerents
| Bulgarians; Vlachs; Supported by: Cumans | Byzantine Empire |

Commanders and leaders
| Ivan Asen I Peter IV | Isaac II Angelos; John Doukas; John Kantakouzenos; Alexios Branas |

The Uprising of Asen and Peter (Bulgarian: Въстание на Асен и Петър) was a revolt of Bulgarians and Vlachs living in Moesia and the Balkan Mountains, then the theme of Paristrion of the Byzantine Empire, caused by a tax increase. It began on 26 October 1185, the feast day of St. Demetrius of Thessaloniki, and ended with the restoration of Bulgaria and the creation of the Second Bulgarian Empire, ruled by the Asen dynasty.

Isaac II Angelus, in order to raise money for his wedding with the daughter of King Béla III of Hungary, levied a new tax which fell heavily on the population of the Haemus Mountains. They sent two leaders (Peter and Asen) to negotiate with the emperor at Kypsella (now İpsala) in Thrace. They asked to be added to the roll of the Byzantine army and to be granted land near Haemus to provide the monetary income needed to pay the tax. This was refused, and Peter and Asen were treated roughly. Their response was to threaten revolt.

After their return, many of the protesters were unwilling to join the rebellion. The brothers Peter and Asen built the Church of St Demetrius of Thessaloniki in Tarnovo, dedicated to Saint Demetrius, who was traditionally considered a patron of the Byzantine city of Thessaloniki, and claimed that the Saint had ceased to favour the Byzantines: "God had decided to free the Bulgarians and the Vlach people and to lift the yoke that they had borne for so long". This persuaded their followers to attack Byzantine cities, seizing prisoners and cattle. Preslav, capital of the First Bulgarian Empire, was raided, and it was after this symbolic incident that Peter assumed the insignia of Tsar (or Emperor).

In the spring of 1186, Isaac started a counter-offensive. It was successful at first. During the solar eclipse of 21 April 1186, the Byzantines successfully attacked the rebels, many of whom fled north of the Danube, making contact with the north-Danubian Vlachs and with the Cumans of the Pontic Steppe. In a symbolic gesture, Isaac II entered Peter's house and took the icon of Saint Demetrius, thus regaining the saint's favour. Still under threat of ambush from the hills, Isaac returned hastily to Constantinople to celebrate his victory. Thus, when the armies of Bulgarians and the Vlachs returned, reinforced by the northern Vlachs and their Cuman allies, they found the region undefended and regained not only their old territory but the whole of Moesia, a considerable step towards the establishment of a new Bulgarian state.

The Emperor now entrusted the war to his uncle, John the sebastocrator, who gained several victories against the rebels but then himself rebelled. He was replaced with the emperor's brother-in-law, John Kantakouzenos, a good strategist but unfamiliar with the guerrilla tactics used by the mountaineers. His army was ambushed, suffering heavy losses, after unwisely pursuing the enemy into the mountains.

The third general in charge of fighting the rebels was Alexius Branas, who, in turn, rebelled and turned on Constantinople. Isaac defeated him with the help of a second brother-in-law, Conrad of Montferrat, but this civil strife had diverted attention from the rebels and Isaac was able to send out a new army only in September 1187. The Byzantines obtained a few minor victories before winter, but the rebels, helped by the Cumans and employing their mountain tactics, still held the advantage.

In the spring of 1187, Isaac attacked the fortress of Lovech, but failed to capture it after a three-month siege. The lands between the Haemus Mons and the Danube were now lost for the Byzantine Empire, leading to the signing of a truce, thus de facto recognising the rule of the Asen and Peter over the territory, leading to the creation of the Second Bulgarian Empire. The Emperor's only consolation was to hold, as hostages, Asen's wife and a certain John (future Kaloyan of Bulgaria), brother of the two new leaders of the Bulgarian state.

== Sources ==
- Nicetas Choniates, Historia, ed. J.-L. Van Dieten, 2 vols. (Berlin and New York, 1975), pp. 368–69, 371–77, 394–99; trans. as O City of Byzantium, Annals of Niketas Choniates, by H.J. Magoulias (Detroit; Wayne State University Press, 1984).

== Bibliography ==
- Paul Stephenson, Byzantium's Balkan Frontier. A Political Study of the Northern Balkans, 900–1204 (Cambridge: Cambridge University Press, 2000) pp. 289–300.
- Max Ritter, Die vlacho-bulgarische Rebellion und die Versuche ihrer Niederschlagung durch Kaiser Isaakios II. (1185-1195), Byzantinoslavica LXXI 1–2, pp 162–210, 2013.
- R. L. Wolff, "The Second Bulgarian Empire. Its origin and history to 1204". Speculum 24 (1949): 167–206.
- George Ostrogorsky, History of the Byzantine State. Rutgers University Press, 1969.
