= Alexios Gidos =

Byzantine general

Alexios Gidos (Greek: Ἀλέξιος Γίδος; fl. ca. 1185–1194) was a senior Byzantine general of the late 12th century. He is the first attested member of the Gidos family, which rose to some prominence in the Byzantine Empire at the end of the 12th and the beginning of the 13th centuries.

Alexios Gidos is first mentioned on the occasion of the Norman sack of Thessalonica in 1185, when he held the post of "Grand Domestic of the East", i.e. commander-in-chief of the Byzantine army's forces in Anatolia. He apparently retained his high post after the downfall of Emperor Andronikos I Komnenos, and re-appears in 1194, when Andronikos' successor Isaac II Angelos sent him against the Bulgarians. This time Gidos was "Grand Domestic of the West", but still commanding the eastern troops, while Basil Vatatzes commanded the western forces. The two generals were heavily defeated at the Battle of Arcadiopolis: most of the Byzantine army, along with Vatatzes, fell, while Gidos managed to escape only with great difficulty. Nothing further is known of him.

In 1898/99, the Greek scholar S. Papadimitriou theorized that the family name and therefore the ancestry of the family was originally Latin, he believed the family surname to be the hellenized form of the Italian name Guido. This in turn led to speculation that there may have been a direct connection with the Gidos family and Guy/Guido, a son of the Norman conqueror of southern Italy, Robert Guiscard, who defected to the Byzantine emperor Alexios I Komnenos (ruled 1081–1118) centuries earlier, entered his service and possibly married into the imperial family. On the other hand, in his Die byzantinische Aussenpolitik zur Zeit der letzten Komnenenkaiser (1967), W. Hecht cast doubt on their Latin origin, and argued that at any rate, by the time Alexios Gidos appears, the family had been thoroughly Byzantinized and shed their Latin identity. It is however impossible to prove any connection with the son of Robert Guiscard or a Latin origin, Byzantine sources do not treat the family as having a foreign origin.

Similarly, another view considers the etymology of the family surname to be of Greek origin, a derivation from the Greek word for "goat" ('Gida' γίδα f., γίδι)

== Sources ==
- Guilland, Rodolphe (1967). "Le grand domestique". Recherches sur les institutions byzantines, Tome I (in French). Berlin: Akademie-Verlag. pp. 405–425.
- Kazhdan, Alexander (1991). "Gidos". In Kazhdan, Alexander (ed.). The Oxford Dictionary of Byzantium. New York and Oxford: Oxford University Press. pp. 850–851. ISBN 978-0-19-504652-6.
