= Cypsela (Thrace) =

Ancient Greek city in Thrace near the river Hebros

Coordinates: 40°55′28″N 26°23′31″E

Cypsela or Kypsela (Ancient Greek: Κυψέλα or Κύψελα), was an ancient Greek town on the river Hebrus in ancient Thrace, which was once an important place on the Via Egnatia. Antiochus besieged Cypsela and its citizens surrendered and became allies with Antiochus.

It was named either after someone called Cypselus or because the area was known for its many beehives (cypselae in Greek).

Its site is located near the modern İpsala.

== See also ==
- Greek colonies in Thrace
