= Peter II of Bulgaria =

Emperor of Bulgaria from 1185 to 1197

Peter II Петър II
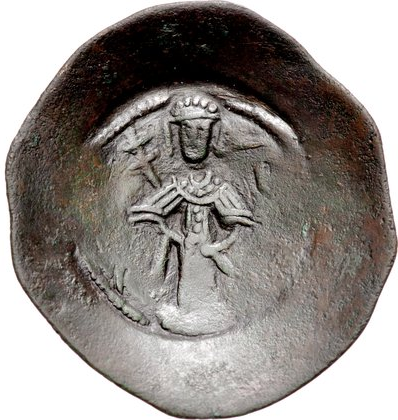
- Coin of Peter II

Tsar of Bulgaria; together with Ivan Asen I (1187/1188 – 1196) and Kaloyan (1196 – 1197)
- Reign: 1185 – 1197
- Coronation: 1185
- Successor: Kaloyan
- Died: 1197
- Dynasty: Asen dynasty

Peter II, (Note: Georgi Atanasov, Miliana Kaimakamova and some other Bulgarian historians refer to him as Peter IV (Bulgarian: Петър IV), because they take into consideration two previous leaders of anti-Byzantine rebellions, Peter Delyan (who assumed the imperial title in 1040) and Constantine Bodin (who took the name Peter in 1072).) born Theodor, also known as Theodor-Peter (Bulgarian: Теодор-Петър; died in 1197), was the first emperor or tsar of the restored Bulgarian Empire from 1185 to 1197.

His exact place and date of birth are unknown, but he is associated with the Byzantine theme of Paristrion. He and his younger brothers, Asen and Kaloyan, were mentioned as Vlachs in most foreign contemporaneous sources but they were probably of a mixed Vlach, Bulgarian, and Cuman origin. In 1185, Theodor and Asen approached the Byzantine Emperor Isaac II Angelos in Thrace, demanding an estate in the Balkan Mountains. After the Emperor refused and humiliated them, they decided to incite a rebellion, taking advantage of the discontent that a new tax had caused among the Bulgarians and Vlachs. To convince their compatriots to join them, they had native prophets declare that Saint Demetrius of Thessalonica had abandoned the Romans in favour of the Bulgarians and Vlachs. Before the end of the year, Theodor was crowned Emperor of Bulgaria, taking the name Peter and adopting the insignia used only by emperors.

The Byzantine army defeated the rebels, forcing Theodor-Peter and Asen to flee to the Cumans in April 1186. Returning in the autumn at the head of Cuman troops, they took control of Paristrion, firmly establishing the new state, regarded as the successor to the First Bulgarian Empire. The brothers made regular raids against nearby Byzantine territories in the early 1190s. Conflicts between Isaac II and the Holy Roman Emperor Frederick Barbarossa during the Third Crusade enabled Peter to conquer new territories in 1190. Peter and Asen divided their realm around 1192, with Peter receiving Preslav and the north-eastern region. After Asen was murdered by a boyar in 1196, Peter appointed Kaloyan as his co-ruler in Asen's place. Peter was also murdered the following year.

== Names ==
The Synodikon of Tzar Boril, composed in 1211, referred to him as "Theodor, called Peter", proving that Theodor was his original name. According to a widespread scholarly theory, he changed his name when he was crowned emperor, most probably in memory of Peter I of Bulgaria who had been canonized in the early 11th century. Historian Alexandru Madgearu says Theodor must have adopted the new name in reference to two leaders of 11th-century anti-Byzantine rebellions, Peter Delyan and Constantine Bodin (or Peter), rather than Peter I, who attempted to maintain peace with the Byzantine Empire. Theodore Balsamon, Patriarch of Antioch, called him "the rebel Slavopetros" in a poem. Two chronicles about Frederick Barbarossa's crusade referred to him as "Kalopeter" (from the Greek expression for "Peter the Handsome").

== Early life ==
The year of Theodor-Peter's birth is unknown. He was apparently the eldest son of a wealthy shepherd from the Haemus Mountains, according to Madgearu. On the other hand, no source records that he or his brother, Asen, owned cattle. Madgearu says, they may have administered an imperial horse farm, adding that their estates were most probably located near Tarnovo. Historian Ivan Dujčev writes that the brothers were local chieftains in the Balkan Mountains.

Theodor-Peter and his brothers were mentioned as Vlachsin sources written in the late 12th and early 13th centuries, but their ethnicity is subject to scholarly debates. The presence of many ethnic groups in the lands to the south of the Lower Danube in the 12th century is well documented, thus they were most likely of mixed Vlach, Bulgarian and Cuman origin. However, they chose to identify themselves as Bulgarians.

Theodor-Peter and Asen approached the Byzantine Emperor Isaac II Angelos near Kypsela in Thrace (now İpsala in Turkey) in late 1185. They asked the emperor to recruit them in the imperial army and to grant them "by imperial rescript a certain estate situated in the vicinity of Mount Haimos, which would provide them with a little revenue", according to the Byzantine historian, Niketas Choniates. Choniates' words show that the brothers wanted to receive a pronoia grant (that is, the revenues from an imperial estate in exchange for military service). According to a scholarly theory, the brothers actually tried to convince the emperor to make them the autonomous rulers of Moesia, because Choniates notes that at a later stage of their rebellion, they "were not content merely to preserve their own possessions and to assume control of the government" of Moesia. Whatever their request was, Isaac II refused them. Asen was also "struck across the face and rebuked for impudence" at the command of the emperor's uncle, John Doukas.

== Uprising ==
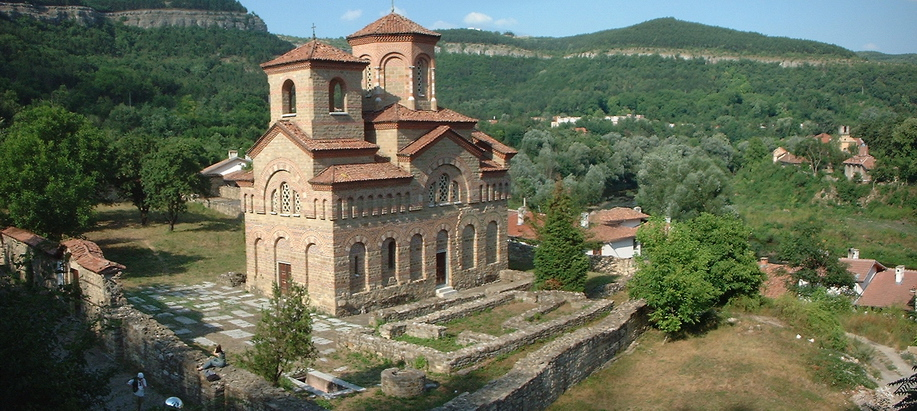
Church of St Demetrius of Thessaloniki in Tarnovo, allegedly erected on the place where the "house of prayer" built by Theodor-Peter and Asen had stood

After their humiliation at Kypsela, Theodor-Peter and Asen returned to their homeland and decided to incite a rebellion. A formal speech, delivered in praise of Isaac II in 1193, stated that Theodor-Peter had been the "first to rebel" against the emperor. Madgearu notes that Michael Choniates describes Theodor-Peter as a "hateful and renegade slave", which also suggests that he was the instigator of the uprising.

The brothers knew that the collection of an extraordinary tax, which had been levied in the autumn of 1185, angered the population, especially in the region of Anchialos (now Pomorie in Bulgaria). However, they could not provoke the discontented people into rebellion initially because their compatriots looked "askance at the magnitude of the undertaking", according to Choniates. Theodor-Peter and Asen decided to take advantage of the Bulgarians and Vlachs' devotion to the cult of the martyr saint Demetrius of Thessaloniki to persuade them to rise up against the Byzantine rule.

Theodor-Peter and Asen built a "house of prayer" dedicated to the saint and gathered Bulgarian and Vlach prophets and prophetesses. At the brothers' instruction, the soothsayers announced "in their ravings" that God had consented to the uprising against the Byzantines, and Saint Demetrius would abandon Thessaloniki and "come over to them to be their helper and assistant" during the forthcoming rebellion. This "professional work of manipulation" was effective: all who were present willingly joined the brothers' movement. Niketas Choniates, who recorded these events, did not name the venue of the gathering, but Tarnovo is the most probable place according to modern scholars' views.

== Emperor ==
=== Beginnings ===
Taking advantage of the war between the Byzantine Empire and the Normans of Sicily, the rebels invaded Thrace and persuaded others to join them. Heartened by the victories, Theodor-Peter "bound his head with a gold chaplet and fashioned scarlet buskins to put on his feet", thus adopting insignia that had been used only by the emperors. Although Choniates does not mention that Theodor-Peter also styled himself emperor, the use of imperial insignia shows that he either had been proclaimed emperor, or at least laid claim to the title. Madgearu says, the coronation most probably took place before the end of 1185, because a priest, Basil, was allegedly made the head of the restored Bulgarian Orthodox Church in that year.

Theodor-Peter laid siege to Preslav, which had been the capital of the First Bulgarian Empire, but they could not capture it. The rebels again stormed into Thrace and carried away "many free [people], much cattle and draft animals, and sheep and goats in no small number" in early 1186. To prevent the rebels from crossing the mountain passes, Isaac II launched a campaign against them, but they occupied "the rough ground and inaccessible places" and resisted the attacks. However, a sudden "blackness" (associated with the solar eclipse of 21 April 1186) rose up and "covered the mountains", enabling the Byzantines to inflict a severe defeat on the rebels.

=== Exile and return ===
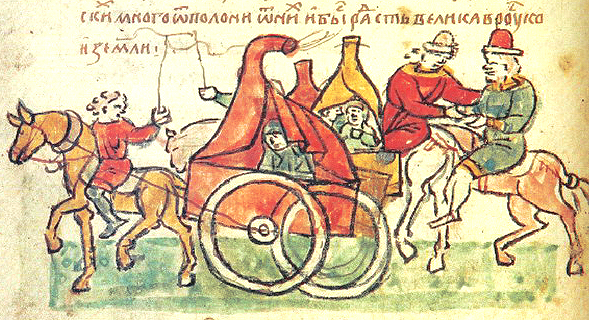
Cumans depicted in the Radziwiłł Chronicle

After the Byzantine victory, a courtier stated that Theodor-Peter and Asen were soon forced to yield to the emperor, describing Theodor-Peter as a bull who had broken the yoke. However, the brothers fled across the Lower Danube and sought assistance from the Cumans. The imperial troops "set up fire to the crops gathered in heaps" by the local inhabitants, but made no major efforts to capture the rebels' fortresses which were "built on sheer cliffs and cloud-capped peaks".

Isaac II also failed to garrison the castles along the Lower Danube, enabling the refugees to return, accompanied by Cuman troops in the autumn of 1186. Theodor-Peter had promised rich booty and salary to the Cumans to talk them into supporting him, according to a letter that Niketas Choniates wrote on the emperor's name a year after the events. The same author attributes the leading role to Asen in the ensuing military campaign in his chronicle. The rebels and their Cuman allies invaded the Byzantine Empire and took control of Paristrion (or Moesia) between the Lower Danube and the mountains. Thereafter the unification of Moesia and Bulgaria "into one empire as of old" (namely, the restoration of the First Bulgarian Empire) became their principal goal. Around that time (in 1187 or 1188), Asen became Theodor-Peter's co-ruler.

According to a scholarly theory, Isaac II acknowledged the independence of the territories under the rule of Theodor-Peter and Asen in a peace treaty signed in the summer of 1188. John Van Antwerp Fine writes, the brothers' realm "included the territory between the Balkan Mountains and the Danube". Madgearu proposes, territories to the south of the mountains, as far as the line connecting Plovdiv, Stara Zagora and Ahtopol, were also incorporated into the new state. The supposed treaty is not mentioned by Choniates. Historian Paul Stephenson states that he has found no evidence in support of a treaty acknowledging the independence of the new state, but he also emphasizes that the territory to the north of the mountains was ruled by various Vlach, Bulgarian and Cuman lords who regarded Theodor-Peter and Asen as their sovereigns.

=== Third Crusade ===
Significant numbers of Bulgarians and Vlachs remained under Byzantine rule after 1188. Those who were subjected to the Byzantine governor of Braničevo harassed the crusaders of the Holy Roman Emperor, Frederick Barbarossa, in July 1189. Around that time, Stefan Nemanja, Grand Župan (or ruler) of Serbia, seized parts of the Byzantine theme (or district) of Bulgaria. Nemanja and Theodor-Peter concluded an agreement against the Byzantines.

Theodor-Peter wanted to take advantage of the crusaders' presence to expand his rule. He and his brother took control of "the region where the Danube flows into the sea" (present-day Dobruja) in the summer. He had already dispatched an embassy to Barbarossa in Niš in July, offering him "due respect and a promise of faithful assistance against his enemies". He sent a second envoy to Barbarossa, who had come into conflict with Isaac II, to Adrianople (now Edirne in Turkey) in December, offering "forty thousand Vlachs and Cumans armed with bows and arrows" to fight against the Byzantines. He also announced his claim to "the imperial crown of the kingdom of the Greeks" (or the Byzantine Empire).

Barbarossa was indeed contemplating an attack against Constantinople, but he changed his mind and concluded a peace treaty with Isaac II in February 1190. On the day when the treaty was concluded, Isaac II's envoy tried to talk Barbarossa into a joint military action against the Vlachs, while Theodor-Peter's delegate again proposed an alliance against the Byzantines. However, Barbarossa, who wanted to continue the crusade towards the Holy Land, refused both offers.

=== New conflicts ===
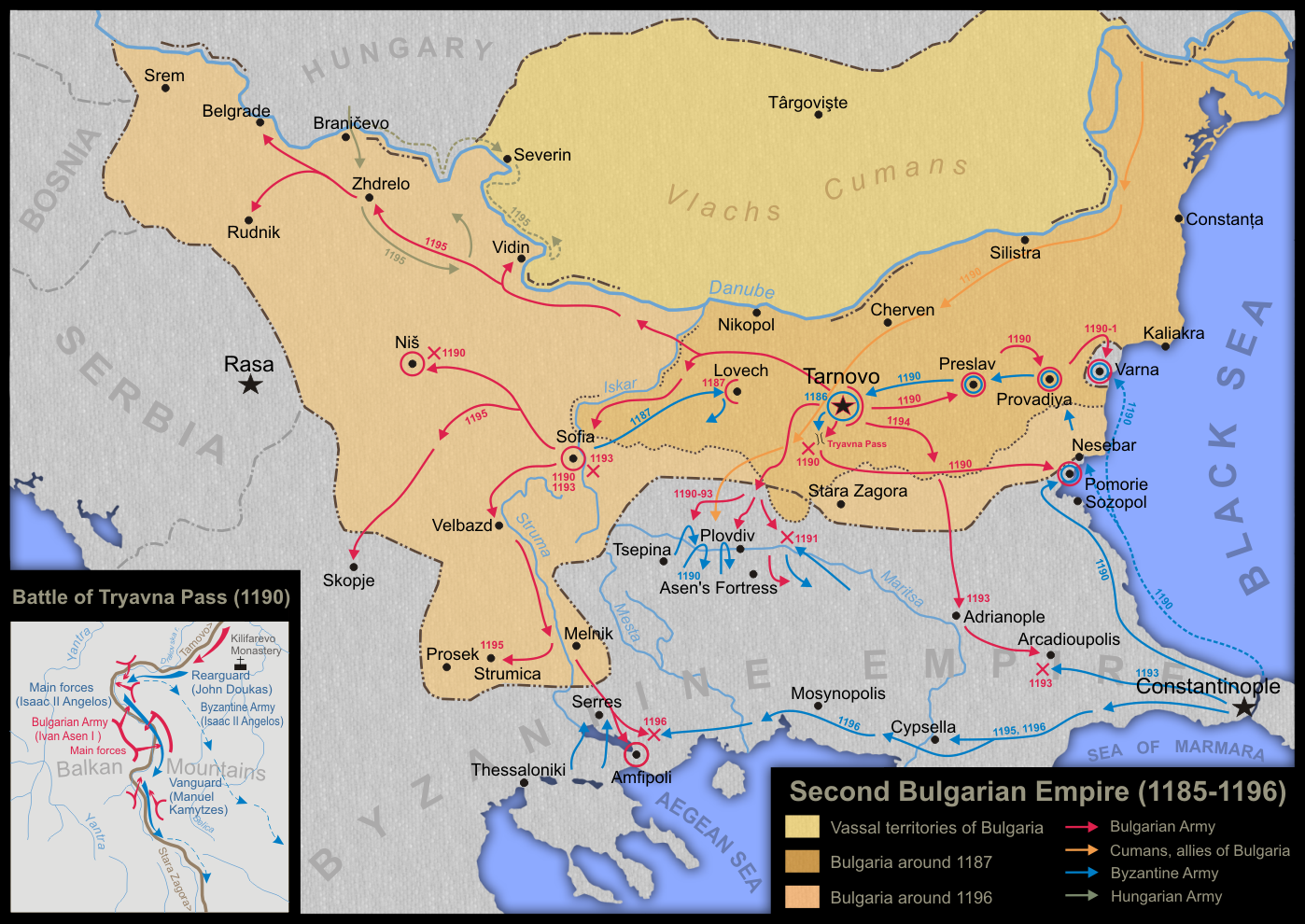
Second Bulgarian Empire from 1185 to 1196 under the rule of Tsar Peter II and Tsar Ivan Asen I., according to a Bulgarian historical atlas. The theory that Bulgaria included Oltenia and Muntenia, as it is presented on the map, is not universally accepted by historians.

After Barbarossa left Thrace, Isaac II was able to make new attempts to recover the lands lost to Theodor-Peter and Asen. In July 1190, he invaded the brothers' realms across the Rish Pass and dispatched a fleet to the Lower Danube to prevent the Cumans from crossing the river. However, the brothers had already strengthened their fortification and avoided direct confrontations with the invaders. The emperor decided to return to his capital after he was informed that Cuman troops had crossed the Lower Danube in September. The Vlachs and the Bulgarians ambushed the imperial army at a narrow pass and inflicted a major defeat on it. Isaac II escaped, but much of the army perished and the victors seized "the more valuable of the emperor's insignia", including his pyramidal crown and relics associated with the Virgin Mary.

The Vlachs, Bulgarians and Cumans resumed their raids against Byzantine territories. They sacked Varna and Pomorie; they destroyed Triaditsa and seized the relics of Ivan of Rila, a saint especially venerated by the Bulgarians. Isaac II routed Cuman marauders near Plovdiv in April 1191. He made his cousin, Constantine Doukas Angelos, the commander of Plovdiv in 1192. Constantine prevented Theodor-Peter and Asen from making frequent pillaging raids against Thrace, but he was blinded after he tried to dethrone the emperor. Theodor-Peter and Asen rejoiced over Constantine's fate. According to Choniates, they said they were ready to make "Isaac emperor over their own nation, for he could not have benefited the Vlachs more than gouging out Constantine's eyes".

At least two eulogies delivered in 1193 provide evidence that Isaac had succeeded in creating a rift between Theodor-Peter and Asen. An orator mentioned that Theodor-Peter had concluded a peace treaty with the Byzantines; the other described him as "a stumbling block to his brother" and an enemy to his own family, while describing Asen as a "most reckless and obdurate rebel". George Akropolites records that Preslav, Provadia and the "area around them" was still known as "Peter's land" in the 13th century. The sources suggest that the brothers divided the territories under their rule into two, most probably in 1192, according to Madgearu. Receiving the northeastern region, Theodor-Peter set up his capital at Preslav. Fine says the strife between the brothers was most probably soon rectified, because they jointly ordered the invasion of Thrace in 1193.

=== Last years ===
Asen was murdered in Tarnovo by the boyar Ivanko in the fall of 1196. Theodor-Peter soon mustered his troops, hurried to the town and laid siege to it. Ivanko sent an envoy to Constantinople, urging the new Byzantine Emperor, Alexios III Angelos, to send reinforcements to him. The emperor dispatched Manuel Kamytzes to lead an army to Tarnovo, but fear of an ambush at the mountain passes led to an outbreak of mutiny and the troops forced him to return. Ivanko realized that he could not defend Tarnovo any more and fled from the town to Constantinople. Theodor-Peter entered Tarnovo. After making his younger brother Kaloyan the ruler of the town, he returned to Preslav.

Theodor-Peter was murdered "in obscure circumstances" in 1197. He was "run through by the sword of one of his countrymen", according to Choniates' record. Historian István Vásáry writes, Theodor-Peter was killed during a riot; Stephenson proposes, the native lords got rid of him, because of his close alliance with the Cumans.

== See also ==
- Asen dynasty
- Byzantine–Bulgarian wars
- Bogomilism

== Sources ==
=== Primary sources ===
- George Akropolites: The History (Translated with and Introduction and Commentary by Ruth Macrides) (2007). Oxford University Press. ISBN 978-0-19-921067-1.
- O City of Byzantium, Annals of Niketas Choniatēs (Translated by Harry J. Magoulias) (1984). Wayne State University Press. ISBN 978-0-8143-1764-8.
- "The History of the Expedition of the Emperor Frederick". In The Crusade of Frederick Barbarossa: The History of the Expedition of the Emperor Frederick and Related Texts (Translated by G. A. Loud) (2013). Ashgate Publishing. pp. 33–134. ISBN 9781472413963.

=== Secondary sources ===
- Chary, Frederick B. (2011). The History of Bulgaria. Greenwood. ISBN 978-0-313-38447-9.
- Curta, Florin (2006). Southeastern Europe in the Middle Ages, 500–1250. Cambridge University Press. ISBN 978-0-521-85085-8.
- Dall'Aglio, Francesco (2013). "The interaction between nomadic and sedentary peoples on the Lower Danube: the Cumans and the "Second Bulgarian Empire"". In Curta, Florin; Maleon, Bogdan–Petru (eds.). The Steppe Lands and the World Beyond Them: Studies in Honor of Victor Spinei on his 70th Birthday. Editura Universității "Alexandru Ian Cuza". pp. 299–313. ISBN 978-973-703-933-0.
- Fine, John V. A. (1994) [1987]. The Late Medieval Balkans: A Critical Survey from the Late Twelfth Century to the Ottoman Conquest. Ann Arbor, Michigan: University of Michigan Press. ISBN 978-0-472-10079-8.
- Madgearu, Alexandru (2017). The Asanids: The Political and Military History of the Second Bulgarian Empire, 1185–1280. BRILL. ISBN 978-9-004-32501-2.
- Petkov, Kiril (2008). The Voices of Medieval Bulgaria, Seventh-Fifteenth Century: The Records of a Bygone Culture. BRILL. ISBN 978-90-04-16831-2.
- Stephenson, Paul (2000). Byzantium's Balkan Frontier: A Political Study of the Northern Balkans, 900–1204. Cambridge University Press. ISBN 978-0-521-02756-4.
- Treadgold, Warren (1997). A History of the Byzantine State and Society. Stanford, California: Stanford University Press. ISBN 0-8047-2630-2.
- Vásáry, István (2005). Cumans and Tatars: Oriental Military in the Pre-Ottoman Balkans, 1185–1365. Cambridge University Press. ISBN 0-521-83756-1.

Peter II of Bulgaria Asen dynasty Died: 1197
Regnal titles
Vacant Byzantine conquest of Bulgaria Title last held by Ivan Vladislav	Emperor of Bulgaria; 1185–1197 with Ivan Asen I Kaloyan	Succeeded by Kaloyan as sole emperor
