= Paristrion =

Byzantine province (theme) in the Balkans

Paristrion Παρίστριον, Παραδούναβον, Παραδούναβις
- Province (doukaton) of the Byzantine Empire
- 10th/11th–1185
- The province of Paristrion ca. 1045.
- Capital: Dorostolon
- Historical era: Middle Ages
  - Establishment.: 10th or 11th century
  - Disbanded as a province.: 1185

Paristrion (Greek: Παρίστριον, lit. 'beside the Ister'), or Paradounabon/Paradounabis (Παραδούναβον / Παραδούναβις), which is preferred in official documents, was a Byzantine province covering the southern bank of the Lower Danube (Moesia Inferior) in the 11th and 12th centuries.

Although Byzantine authors use the term to describe the lands along the Danube in general, the province of Paristrion seems to have comprised mostly modern Dobruja. It is not certain exactly when the province was established: the Romanian scholar Nicolae Bănescu considered that it was established immediately after the end of the Rus'–Byzantine War of 970–971, while others, such as Vasil Zlatarski, thought it a later, mid-11th century creation. It was governed by a katepano or a doux, and was probably based at Dorostolon (modern Silistra), where a Byzantine strategia ("generalcy") is indeed attested in the 970s. In the aftermath of his victory over the Rus', Emperor John I Tzimiskes (r. 969–976) appointed general Leo Sarakenopoulos as commander over north-eastern Bulgaria, based at Pereyaslavets/Ioannopolis. Sarakenopoulos and his subordinates engaged in major fortification activities in the region of the Dobruja over the next few years, where abandoned Roman-era forts were rebuilt and re-occupied.

The region however fell back under Bulgarian control under the Cometopuli brothers in 986 and was held until c. 1001, when Byzantine control was re-established. Bănescu, however, considered that Dorostolon at least remained in Byzantine hands throughout. From the 1030s on, the region faced the continuous raids of the Pechenegs. The population was withdrawn to a few large fortified centres, and the Pechenegs were allowed to settle in the province as allies and colonists (termed mixobarbaroi by contemporary authors) and kept pacified through subsidies and through a vibrant trade. It was not until the early 1070s that the Pechenegs launched an open rebellion, and posed a constant threat to the Byzantine Empire's Balkan provinces until decisively defeated at the Battle of Levounion in 1091. Despite occasional Cuman raids thereafter, the Paristrion remained largely peaceful and prosperous in the 12th century. The province seems to have been disbanded by the late 12th century.

== Rulers ==
-Basil Apokapes- 1056-1064

-Nestor 1074-1078( in rebellion)

== Sources ==
- Kazhdan, Alexander, ed. (1991). The Oxford Dictionary of Byzantium. Oxford and New York: Oxford University Press. ISBN 0-19-504652-8.
- Nesbitt, John; Oikonomides, Nicolas, eds. (1991). Catalogue of Byzantine Seals at Dumbarton Oaks and in the Fogg Museum of Art, Volume 1: Italy, North of the Balkans, North of the Black Sea. Washington, DC: Dumbarton Oaks Research Library and Collection. ISBN 0-88402-194-7.
- Stephenson, Paul (2000). Byzantium's Balkan Frontier: A Political Study of the Northern Balkans, 900–1204. Cambridge, United Kingdom: Cambridge University Press. ISBN 0-521-77017-3.
