= Thrace (theme) =

Administrative subdivision of the Byzantine Empire

Theme of Thrace θέμα Θρᾴκης, θέμα Θρᾳκῷον
- Theme of the Byzantine Empire
- c. 680–1204; 1230s–14th century
- The Byzantine themata of Asia Minor and the thema of Thrace in c. 780.
- Capital: Constantinople (Istanbul) / Adrianople (Edirne)/ Arcadiopolis (Lüleburgaz)
- Historical era: Middle Ages
  - Established: 680/681
  - Latin conquest: 1204
  - Nicaean recovery: 1230s
  - Divided into smaller units.: 14th century
- Today part of: Turkey; Greece; Bulgaria

The Theme of Thrace (Greek: θέμα Θρᾴκης or θέμα Θρᾳκῷον) was a province (thema or theme) of the Byzantine Empire located in the south-eastern Balkans, comprising varying parts of the eponymous geographic region during its history.

== History ==
Traditionally, it has been held that the theme (at the time primarily a military command) was constituted in c. 680, as a response to the Bulgar threat. This is based on the mention of a certain patrikios Theodore, Count of the Opsikion and hypostrategos of Thrace, in 680/681. However, it is unclear whether this implies the existence of Thrace as a separate command, with Theodore holding a dual post, or whether Thrace was administratively united to the Opsikion. In fact, separate strategoi of Thrace are not clearly attested in literary sources until 742, while seals of strategoi are also extant only from the eighth century on. Initially, Adrianople was probably the theme's capital.

Under Empress Irene of Athens, in the late eighth century, the theme was divided, with the western part being constituted as the separate theme of Macedonia. From then on, the theme's capital was at Arcadiopolis, with subordinate tourmarchai at Bizye and Sozopolis. Another, called tourmarches tes Thrakes ("of Thrace") is also attested, possibly the strategos' deputy at Arcadiopolis. The Arab geographers Ibn Khordadbeh (wrote ca. 847) and Ibn al-Faqih (wrote ca. 903) mention the theme as extending "from the long wall [the Anastasian Wall]" to the theme of Macedonia, and north up to the country of the Bulgars, counting 10 fortified places and 5,000 troops. Indeed, the boundaries of the theme fluctuated along with the northern frontier of Byzantium during the Byzantine–Bulgarian Wars. Initially, the theme must have comprised most of the ancient Diocese of Thrace, except for the country along the Danube overrun by the Bulgars (Lower Moesia), but after the conquests of Krum (r. 803–814), Omurtag (r. 814–831), and Symeon (r. 893–927) the border moved by stages south of the Balkan Mountains to roughly the line of the present Bulgarian frontier with Greece and Turkey. Thus, at around the start of the tenth century, the theme comprised essentially the eastern half of modern Eastern Thrace, although it extended north along the coast to include Anchialos.

From the eleventh century, Thrace and Macedonia appear to have been usually combined, as attested by numerous strategoi and judges (kritai) holding jurisdiction over both themes. The name fell out of use as an administrative term in the Palaiologan period, but it is still encountered in some historians of the time as an antiquarian term.

== Sources ==
- Haldon, John F. (1997). Byzantium in the Seventh Century: The Transformation of a Culture. Cambridge: Cambridge University Press. ISBN 978-0-521-31917-1.
- Kazhdan, Alexander, ed. (1991). The Oxford Dictionary of Byzantium. Oxford and New York: Oxford University Press. ISBN 0-19-504652-8.
- Nesbitt, John; Oikonomides, Nicolas, eds. (1991). Catalogue of Byzantine Seals at Dumbarton Oaks and in the Fogg Museum of Art, Volume 1: Italy, North of the Balkans, North of the Black Sea. Washington, DC: Dumbarton Oaks Research Library and Collection. ISBN 0-88402-194-7.
- Pertusi, A. (1952). Constantino Porfirogenito: De Thematibus (in Italian). Rome: Biblioteca Apostolica Vaticana.
