= List of 12th-century religious leaders =

This is a list of the top-level leaders for religious groups with at least 50,000 adherents, and that led anytime from January 1, 1101, to December 31, 1200. It should likewise only name leaders listed on other articles and lists.

== Christianity ==
=== Catholicism ===
- Roman Catholic Church (complete list) –

- Paschal II, Pope (1099–1118)
- Gelasius II, Pope (1118–1119)
- Callixtus II, Pope (1119–1124)
- Honorius II, Pope (1124–1130)
- Innocent II, Pope (1130–1143)
- Celestine II, Pope (1143–1144)
- Lucius II, Pope (1144–1145)
- Eugene III, Pope (1145–1153)
- Anastasius IV, Pope (1153–1154)
- Adrian IV, Pope (1154–1159)
- Alexander III, Pope (1159–1181)
- Lucius III, Pope (1181–1185)
- Urban III, Pope (1185–1187)
- Gregory VIII, Pope (1187)
- Clement III, Pope (1187–1191)
- Celestine III, Pope (1191–1198)
- Innocent III, Pope (1198–1216)

=== Eastern Orthodoxy ===
- Church of Constantinople – (complete list), the first among equals in Eastern Orthodoxy

- Nicholas III Grammaticus, Ecumenical Patriarch (1084–1111)
- John IX Agapetus, Ecumenical Patriarch (1111–1134)
- Leo Styppeiotes, Ecumenical Patriarch (1134–1143)
- Michael II Kourkouas, Ecumenical Patriarchs (1143–1146)
- Cosmas II Atticus, Ecumenical Patriarch (1146–1147)
- Nicholas IV Mouzalon, Ecumenical Patriarch (1147–1151)
- Theodotus II, Ecumenical Patriarch (1151–1153)
- Neophytos I, Ecumenical Patriarch (1154)
- Constantine IV Chliarenus, Ecumenical Patriarch (1154–1156)
- Luke Chrysoberges, Ecumenical Patriarch (1156–1169)
- Michael III of Anchialus, Ecumenical Patriarch (1170–1177)
- Chariton, Ecumenical Patriarch (1177–1178)
- Theodosius I Boradiotes, Ecumenical Patriarch (1179–1183)
- Basil II Kamateros, Ecumenical Patriarch (1183–1186)
- Niketas II Mountanes, Ecumenical Patriarch (1186–1189)
- Leontius Theotokites, Ecumenical Patriarch (1189–1190)
- Dositheus, Ecumenical Patriarch (1190–1191)
- George II Xiphilinos, Ecumenical Patriarch (1191–1198)
- John X Kamateros, Ecumenical Patriarch (1198–1206)

=== Nestorianism ===
- Church of the East, (complete list) –

- Mar Yab-Alaha II Bar Qaiyuma, Patriarch (1190–1222)

== Islam ==
=== Sunni ===
- Abbasid Caliphate, Baghdad (complete list) –

- al-Mustazhir, Caliph (1094–1118)
- ar-Rashid, Caliph (1109–1138)
- al-Muqtafi, Caliph (1136–1160)
- al-Mustanjid, Caliph (1160–1170)
- al-Mustadi, Caliph (1170–1180)
- al-Nasir, Caliph (1180–1225)

- Almohad Caliphate, Morocco (complete list) –

- Abd al-Mu'min, Caliph (1147–1163)
- Abu Yaqub Yusuf, Caliph (1163–1184)
- Yaqub al-Mansur, Caliph (1184–1199)
- Muhammad al-Nasir, Caliph (1199–1213)

=== Shia ===
- Twelver Islam

- Imams (complete list) –
- Muhammad al-Mahdi, Imam (874–present) Shia belief holds that he was hidden by Allah in 874.

- Marja

- Shaykh Tabarsi(1125-1153)
- Qutubuddin Rawandi(1153-1177)
- Allamah Al-Hilli(1177-1202)

==== Isma'ili ====
- Musta'li Isma'ilism (complete list) –

- al-Musta'li, Caliph and Imam (1094–1101)
- Al-Amir bi-Ahkam Allah, Caliph and Imam (1101–1130)

- Hafizi line

- al-Hafiz, Caliph and Imam (1130–1149)
- al-Zafir, Caliph and Imam (1149–1154)
- al-Fa'iz bi-Nasr Allah, Caliph and Imam (1154–1160)
- al-Adid, Caliph and Imam (1160–1171)
- Dawud al-Hamid li'llah, Imam (1171–1207)

- Tayyibi line

- al-Tayyib Abu'l-Qasim Imam (1130–?), went into occultation, leadership de facto taken over by the Da'i al-Mutlaqs:

- Dhu'ayb ibn Musa, Da'i al-Mutlaq (1132–1151)
- Ibrahim ibn al-Husayn al-Hamidi, Da'i al-Mutlaq (1151–1162)
- Hatim ibn Ibrahim, Da'i al-Mutlaq (1162–1199)
- Ali ibn Hatim, Da'i al-Mutlaq (1199–1209)

- Nizari Isma'ilism (complete list) –

- Ali al-Hadi, Imam (1095–?) in occultation
- Muhammad al-Muhtadi, Imam in occultation
- Hasan (I) al-Qahir, Imam in occultation

- During the occultation of the imams, de facto leadership held by the da'i and commander of Alamut Castle:

- Hassan-i Sabbah, da'i (1095–1124)
- Kiya Buzurg-Ummid, da'i (1124–1138)
- Muhammad ibn Buzurg-Ummid, da'i (1138–1162)

- Hassan II, Imam (1162–1166)
- Nur al-Din Muhammad II, Imam (1166–1210)

==== Zaydi ====
- Zaydi imams of Yemen (complete list) –

- al-Mutawakkil Ahmad bin Sulayman, Imam (1138–1171)
- al-Mansur Abdallah, Imam (1187–1217)

== Judaism ==
=== Karaite Judaism ===
- Exilarch (complete list) –
  Hasdai ben Hezekiah, Nasi and Exilarch (11th–12th centuries)
  Solomon ben Hasdai, Nasi and Exilarch (12th century)

== See also ==
- Religious leaders by year
- List of state leaders in the 12th century
- Lists of colonial governors by century
