= Alexios Komnenos (protosebastos) =

Byzantine aristocrat and courtier

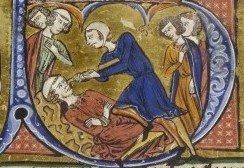
- The blinding of Alexios Komnenos, illuminated miniature from a manuscript of the history of William of Tyre, now in the Bibliothèque nationale de France
- Born: c. 1135 or 1142; Constantinople (modern-day Istanbul, Turkey)
- Died: After 1182; Constantinople
- Noble family: Komnenos
- Spouse: Maria Doukaina
- Father: Andronikos Komnenos
- Mother: Irene

Alexios Komnenos (Greek: Ἀλέξιος Κομνηνός; c. 1135/42 – after 1182) was a Byzantine aristocrat and courtier. A son of Andronikos Komnenos and nephew of Emperor Manuel I Komnenos, he rose to the high rank of prōtostratōr in 1167. In 1176 he participated in the Myriokephalon campaign where, following the death of his older brother John, he was raised to the titles of prōtosebastos and prōtovestiarios. Following Manuel's death in 1180, he won the favour, and reportedly became the lover, of Empress-dowager Maria of Antioch. Through her he ruled the Byzantine Empire for two years as de facto regent of the underage emperor Alexios II Komnenos. The aristocracy challenged his dominance, led by the princess Maria Komnene, who plotted to assassinate the prōtosebastos. The plot was discovered and most conspirators arrested, but Maria and her husband fled to the Hagia Sophia, protected by Patriarch Theodosios Borradiotes and the common people of Constantinople.

Mounting tensions resulted in a popular uprising against Alexios' regime on 2 May 1181, (modern scholars have proposed other dates as well), which ended in a mutual reconciliation. His power shaken, the prōtosebastos reacted by punishing Borradiotes for his role in the affair. Overwhelming opposition, both among the people and the aristocracy, forced him to recall Borradiotes soon after. These events left Alexios in poor shape to oppose the advance of the adventurer Andronikos I Komnenos, who moved against Constantinople from the east. The generals dispatched against Andronikos were defeated or defected, and the usurper entered the city in April 1182. The prōtosebastos Alexios was deposed, publicly humiliated, and mutilated. His fate thereafter is not known.

== Origin and early career under Manuel I ==
Alexios was the second son and the last of five children of the sebastokratōr Andronikos Komnenos, himself the second son of Emperor John II Komnenos and Irene of Hungary. The origin of Alexios' mother, also named Irene, is unknown. The court poet, Theodore Prodromos, composed a laudatory poem to celebrate his birth.

In his prosopographical study of the Komnenoi, the Greek scholar, Konstantinos Varzos, placed his birth on Easter Day 1135 (or possibly 1134 or 1136), as he was old enough to participate in a campaign in 1149/50. Alexios' father died in August 1142, only a little while after his older brother (also named Alexios). The two brothers were on a campaign with their father, John II, and their other brothers in southern Asia Minor, and probably died of the same illness. This provided the occasion for another poem by Prodromos, in which young Alexios is referred to as the only solace for his bereaved mother. The Prosopography of the Byzantine World database, on the other hand, interprets the poems by Prodromos as indicating that Alexios was born in 1142, during his father's absence on the campaign that cost his life.

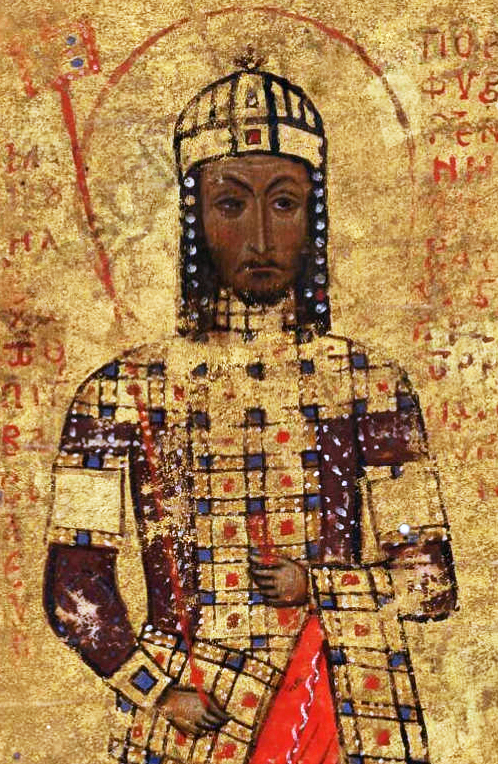
Manuscript miniature of Manuel I, Vatican Library, Rome

When John II died in 1143, his two remaining sons were Isaac and Manuel I Komnenos. Although the younger of the two, because of the army's support, Manuel eventually became emperor. Although Alexios' mother, the sebastokratorissa Irene, suffered repeated disgrace and imprisonment at the hands of Manuel, the emperor showed great favour to her sons, particularly Alexios' older brother John. In c. 1149/50, like all young Byzantine aristocrats, the young Alexios was required to begin his military training and accompany his uncle, Emperor Manuel, on campaign. However, no details of his early military career are known. In c. 1153/4 he married Maria Doukaina, whose exact parentage is unknown. Together they had at least four children: a son Andronikos, a daughter Irene, and a son and daughter whose names are unknown.

The first recorded instance of Alexios attending a public function was at a synod at the imperial Palace of Blachernae, on 12 May 1157, with his brother John. He also participated in the synod of March 1166, also along with John. In both cases, Alexios is recorded among the imperial relatives, with no rank or title. In May/June 1167, following the dismissal and banishment of the prōtostratōr, Alexios Axouch, Alexios Komnenos assumed this high office. He appears with this rank at the synod in February 1170 that was convened to sit judgment against John Eirenikos. Sometime during his tenure as prōtostratōr, Alexios fell gravely ill, and his wife donated a richly embroidered veil to the Church of the Saviour at the Chalke Gate, an occasion celebrated by an anonymous court poet.

Like most of the Byzantine aristocracy, Alexios took part in the campaign that led to the disastrous Battle of Myriokephalon in September 1176. His brother John was one of the battle's casualties. Alexios, as the last remaining son of Manuel's brothers, succeeded him in his titles of prōtosebastos and prōtovestiarios. Like John before him, these titles raised Alexios to the pinnacle of the Byzantine court. As prōtosebastos, he was the most senior of the sebastoi, a group which, since the days of Alexios I Komnenos, denoted the most senior members of the court, usually close relatives or special favourites of the emperor. Furthermore, as prōtovestiarios, he was the "titular head of the imperial household", with important ceremonial and diplomatic duties. His previous post of prōtostratōr went to another Alexios, son of Andronikos Komnenos Vatatzes. Soon after Alexios' promotion, his wife died, and his son Andronikos was mortally injured after falling from his horse. The poet Gregory Antiochos wrote a lament on the occasion.

In spring 1178, Alexios led an embassy to France. His first mission concerned the marriage of his cousin Eudokia—daughter of his paternal uncle Isaac—to Ramon Berenguer III, Count of Provence, brother of King Alfonso II of Aragon. The opposition of the German emperor Frederick Barbarossa aborted the marriage, and Eudokia was married instead to William VIII of Montpellier. Alexios then proceeded to Paris, to escort Agnes, a daughter of King Louis VII of France and the prospective bride of Manuel's son and heir Alexios II Komnenos, back to Byzantium. The embassy left Paris on Easter 1179, and returned via Italy to Constantinople, where Agnes and Alexios II were betrothed.

== Rise to power ==
When Manuel died on 24 September 1180, his heir, Alexios II, born in 1169, was underage. Manuel had neglected providing for a regency, and power automatically passed to the hands of the Empress-dowager, Maria of Antioch. Although after Manuel's death she had become a nun, the Empress-dowager immediately became the focus of attention of ambitious suitors who sought to win her affection, and supreme power along with it. Alexios soon emerged as the winner of this competition, and became the de facto regent of the state alongside her. Rumours spread that he also became Maria's lover. Although this was apparently widely believed at the time, modern scholars like Varzos are doubtful, as the Byzantine sources are themselves divided over the matter: while the contemporary official and historian, Niketas Choniates, reports the rumours almost as fact, the 13th-century chronicler Theodore Skoutariotes appears to have considered them baseless.

Nevertheless, Alexios evidently exercised considerable power. As Choniates writes, "confident of his own power and his great influence over the empress", Alexios "had the emperor promulgate a decree that henceforth no document signed by the imperial hand would be valid unless first reviewed by Alexios and validated by his notation 'approved' (ἐτηρήθησαν) in frog green ink", so that "nothing whatsoever could be done except through him". In addition, all revenue was channeled to the prōtosebastos and the Empress-dowager. Soon rumours began to circulate that the prōtosebastos planned to supplant the young emperor and "mount both the mother and the throne", as Choniates put it.

Whether or not Alexios intended to usurp the throne his concentration of power alarmed the other imperial relatives, above all Emperor Manuel's daughter from his first marriage, the porphyrogennētē princess Maria Komnene. Maria's relations with her step-mother were already strained before Manuel's death and, according to Choniates, Maria was incensed at the thought of the prōtosebastos and the Empress-dowager sullying her father's bed. The opposition that began to coalesce around her included: her husband, the Caesar Renier of Montferrat, Manuel's illegitimate son the sebastokratōr Alexios Komnenos, the prōtostratōr Alexios Komnenos, the Eparch of the City John Kamateros Doukas, Andronikos Lapardas, Maria's cousins Manuel and John (sons of the future emperor Andronikos I Komnenos, who was then in exile), and many others. These leading aristocrats were driven by their exclusion from the share in power and wealth they had enjoyed under Manuel, and the fear that they might be imprisoned themselves.

Choniates and his contemporaries, Archbishop Eustathius of Thessalonica and William of Tyre, report that, finding themselves ever more unpopular, the Empress-dowager and Alexios turned to the numerous Latin residents of Constantinople and Latin mercenaries for support, continuing and even augmenting Manuel's pro-Latin policies. Some modern historians, such as Charles Brand, have therefore viewed the contest between the prōtosebastos and the faction around Maria as that of pro-Latin and anti-Latin parties. Most modern historians on the other hand stress that lines were not so clear cut, as the aristocratic opposition included Latins like Renier, and also recruited Latin mercenaries. According to this interpretation, the primary concern of the opposition was the prōtosebastos' domination of the government, which had destroyed the previous arrangements under Manuel, where the court aristocracy had been "equal in power".

== Revolt of Maria Komnene ==
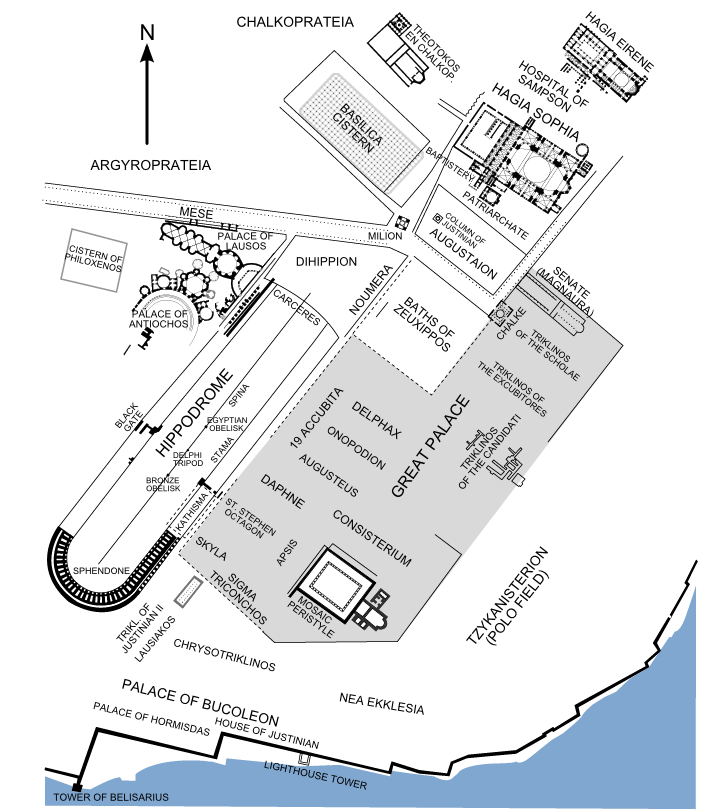
Map of the imperial district of Constantinople, showing the location of the Augoustaion square between the Hippodrome, the Hagia Sophia, and the Great Palace.

According to Choniates, the conspirators planned to assassinate Alexios when he and the emperor were to visit the suburb of Bathys Ryax for the feast day of the martyr Theodore, "on the seventh day of the first week of Lent". A soldier betrayed the conspiracy, however, and most of its members were arrested, tried by a tribunal under the dikaiodotēs Theodore Pantechnes—who succeeded Kamateros as eparch—and imprisoned in the dungeons of the Great Palace. Andronikos Lapardas managed to escape, while the Caesarissa Maria and her husband sought refuge in the Hagia Sophia, where she soon gained the support not only of the Patriarch Theodosios Borradiotes but also of the common people, who took pity on her plight and her imperial descent, and who were further won over because of her largesse in distributing coins to the crowd.

Emboldened by the popular support, the princess refused Alexios' offers of an amnesty, demanding not only a retrial of her co-conspirators but also the immediate dismissal of the prōtosebastos from the palace and the administration. When the Empress-dowager and the prōtosebastos had Alexios II issue a warning to his half-sister that she would be evicted by force, she again refused, and despite the Patriarch's angry objections started posting her followers to keep watch over the entrances to the great church, recruiting even "Italians in heavy armor and stouthearted Iberians from the East who had come to the City for commercial purposes", as Choniates reports. To them were added the masses of the capital's people, who assembled and began to sympathise publicly with Maria and denounce the prōtosebastos and the Empress-dowager. Led by three priests, the populace was driven to rebellion, and over several days they not only demonstrated before the gates of the palace but also ransacked several mansions of the nobility, including that of Pantechnes.

Matters came to a head on the seventh day of the uprising, as the prōtosebastos brought in troops from both Asia and Europe under the command of Sabbatios the Armenian. In the meantime, Princess Maria's supporters barricaded themselves behind the Augoustaion square between the Great Palace and the Hagia Sophia, after they razed the adjoining buildings. Moving forward at dawn, the imperial troops ascended the roof of the Church of St. John the Theologian, and then moved to cut off the Hagia Sophia and Maria's supporters in the Augoustaion from the rest of the city. After a fiercely contested battle, towards evening Maria and her followers were driven from the arches at the entrance of the Augoustaion and their positions on top of the Milion and the Church of Alexios (on the western side of the square, north of the Milion) into the open square. Protected by their fellows who fired missiles from the upper galleries of the Hagia Sophia, the rebels began to withdraw into the exonarthex of the Hagia Sophia, while the imperials were reluctant to follow "in fear of the temple's narrow passageways". The Caesar Renier rallied about 150 of his men from his own Latin bodyguards and his wife's servants and followers, gave a speech justifying their struggle, and led them forth against the imperial troops in the Augoustaion, who retreated hastily and in confusion. As Choniates writes, "the imperial troops no longer dared to enter the open court but preferred to fight by firing missiles". Renier returned to the Hagia Sophia, and with the fall of night, a stalemate ensued.

The Patriarch now interceded with Empress Maria of Antioch to put an end to the fighting. In response, a delegation of the most distinguished nobles and officials, led by the megas doux Andronikos Kontostephanos and the megas hetaireiarchēs John Doukas, were sent to the Caesarissa and Renier in the Hagia Sophia. There they "gave her pledges of good faith confirmed by oaths, assuring her that nothing unpleasant would befall her. She would not be deprived of her dignities and privileges by her brother the emperor, or her stepmother the empress, or the prōtosebastos Alexios, and full amnesty would be granted her supporters and allies", as Choniates reports. With this, the two sides disbanded their forces, and Maria and her husband returned to the Great Palace to meet the Empress-dowager and the prōtosebastos and confirm their reconciliation.

The precise dating of these events is disputed. Choniates records the date of the clash between the supporters of the Caesarissa and the imperial troops as 2 May on the 15th indiction, i.e. 2 May 1182. As this was the date of the Massacre of the Latins, modern scholars generally consider this erroneous. Some have interpreted the date as 2 May 1181, but this in turn contradicts the indiction dating given by Choniates. Among the scholars who accept the dating of these events to 1181, several, including the English translator of Choniates, Harry Magoulias, place the date of the intended coup on 7 February, but Choniates' German editor, Jean-Louis Van Dieten, points out that on that year the feast day of the martyr Theodore was on 21 February. According to Van Dieten's reconstructed chronology, the condemnation of the conspirators took place on 1 March 1181, and the clashes took place on 2 May. The historian Oktawiusz Jurewicz, in his study on Andronikos I Komnenos, placed the events in 1182. As other, more precisely dated, events took place soon after, he proposed a condensed timeframe in which the uprising and reconciliation all took place in February 1182, with the date for the aborted coup set on 13 February.

== Downfall ==
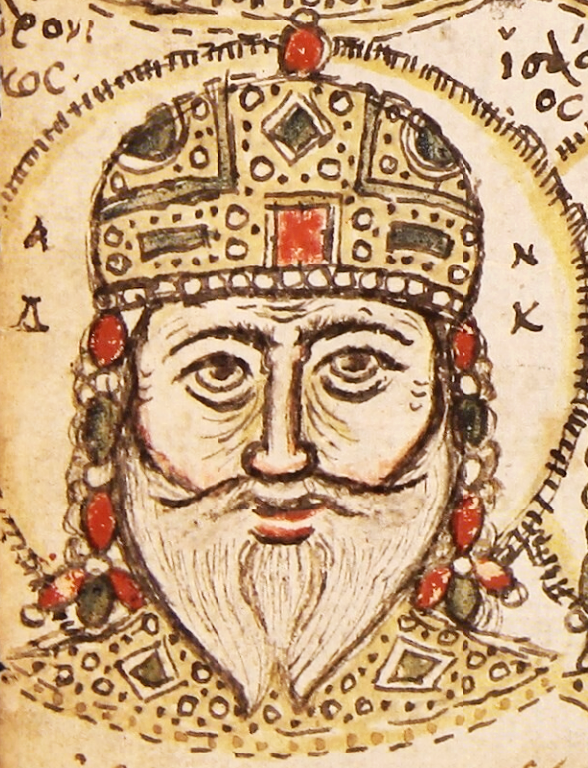
15th-century portrait of Andronikos I Komnenos

Despite the failure of the revolt, the position of the prōtosebastos was weakened: on the one hand, his readiness to use force against fellow citizens, even in the most hallowed of all churches in the Empire, increased popular hostility, while on the other, the amnesty offered to Maria and her supporters strengthened the perception of the regime's weakness. Alexios exacerbated the situation when he turned against Patriarch Theodosios for the aid and shelter he had given the rebels. The Patriarch was confined in the Pantepoptes Monastery. Only the intervention of the Empress-regent and other members of the imperial family saved him from being dismissed. At long last, the prōtosebastos was forced to consent to the Patriarch's reinstatement. His triumphal return, with jubilant crowds lining the procession that led him back to the patriarchal palace near the Hagia Sophia, was another blow to the regime's authority.

In the meantime, the ambitious Andronikos Komnenos, cousin of Emperor Manuel, watched affairs in the capital from the Pontus, where he had been appointed governor. His sons Manuel and John had participated in the revolt, and the leaders of the conspiracy were in contact with him. Andronikos sent many letters to his nephew, the young Alexios II, to the Patriarch Theodosios and others bemoaning the usurpation of the young emperor's rights by the prōtosebastos, and the impropriety of the latter's alleged relationship with the Empress-regent. Relying on his oath to Emperor Manuel to uphold the rule of both Manuel and Alexios II—an oath occasioned more by his own, well-known ambitions—he even claimed to have been charged by the late Manuel to safeguard the rule of his son. Following the suppression of the uprising, his daughter Maria hastened to him at Sinope, bearing news; soon more letters came from the capital urging him to intervene. In autumn 1181, Andronikos began his march against Constantinople, proceeding slowly to give the impression of a large and cumbersome force, and allowing time for his propaganda to have an impact. Only the city of Nicaea under John Doukas, and the Theme of Thrace under the megas domestikos John Komnenos Vatatzes, rejected his claims and resisted his advance. Choniates accused the prōtosebastos of lethargy and neglect ("he was unmanly and not only spent the early morning in sound sleep but also wasted most of the day sleeping") in dealing with Andronikos, but Skoutariotes does not repeat these accusations and modern scholars dismiss them.

Nevertheless, the army sent by the government, under Andronikos Angelos (the father of the future emperors Isaac II and Alexios III), was defeated at Charax near Nicomedia, even though according to Choniates it faced only "farmers unfit for warfare and a contingent of Paphlagonian soldiers". On his return to Constantinople, Angelos faced accusations that he had misappropriated money meant for the army's salary. Fearing accusations of pro-Andronikos sentiments, he barricaded himself and his family in their mansion, before fleeing the city altogether and joining Andronikos Komnenos in Bithynia. Emboldened by this defection, Andronikos Komnenos moved to Chalcedon, across the Bosporus from Constantinople. Again he put on an appearance of having a large army and a powerful navy, but in reality they were far inferior. The imperial fleet still blocked Andronikos' passage; Alexios tried to bolster his position by manning as many ships as he could with Latins who were loyal to him, but the megas doux, Andronikos Kontostephanos, forced him to concede command of the navy. Alexios attempted to negotiate, and sent George Xiphilinos (a future patriarch) to Andronikos' camp, offering a pardon and high office. In the event, Xiphilinos betrayed the prōtosebastos, and Andronikos rejected the offer, insisting instead that the prōtosebastos retire and be held accountable for his administration, and the Empress-dowager be confined to a convent. Within a few days, Andronikos Kontostephanos also defected to the rebels with the Byzantine-manned ships.

This was the final blow for the prōtosebastos; Andronikos Komnenos' supporters now began to move openly and even sailed across to visit him at his camp. Conversely, although he still held valuable hostages—including Andronikos' sons—Alexios appears to have become dejected and passively awaited events. In late April, a revolt in the city opened the prisons of the Great Palace and set the prōtosebastos' opponents free. His supporters and family were now arrested and thrown in the same cells. German mercenaries arrested the prōtosebastos in the palace, probably suborned by Andronikos. Under cover of night he was moved to the House of Michaelitzes in the patriarchal palace. During his captivity there, his guards tortured him by preventing him from sleeping, despite the intercession of Patriarch Theodosios. After a few days he was led, seated on a pony and preceded by a reed flag in mockery of a banner amidst the jeers and abuse of the populace, to a fishing boat and across to Chalcedon. There Andronikos Komnenos, in front of the assembled aristocrats, ordered his eyes gouged out. The Latin chronicler William of Tyre reports that his genitals were also cut off as punishment for his affair with the Empress, but this is not corroborated by any other source.

The remainder of his life, and the date and circumstances of his death, are unknown. Likewise, his children lived and died in obscurity.

== Sources ==
- Brand, Charles M. (1968). Byzantium Confronts the West, 1180–1204. Cambridge, Massachusetts: Harvard University Press. LCCN 67-20872.
- Choniates, Nicetas (1984). O City of Byzantium, Annals of Niketas Choniatēs. Translated by Harry J. Magoulias. Detroit: Wayne State University Press. ISBN 0-8143-1764-2.
- Magdalino, Paul (2002) [1993]. The Empire of Manuel I Komnenos, 1143–1180 (Second ed.). Cambridge: Cambridge University Press. ISBN 9780521526531.
- Simpson, Alicia (2013). Niketas Choniates: A Historiographical Study. Oxford University Press. ISBN 978-0-19-967071-0.
- Van Dieten, Jean-Louis (1999). "Eustathios von Thessalonike und Niketas Choniates über das Geschehen im Jahre nach dem Tod Manuels I. Komnenos". Jahrbuch der Österreichischen Byzantinistik (in German). 49: 101–112. ISSN 0378-8660.
- Varzos, Konstantinos (1984). Η Γενεαλογία των Κομνηνών [The Genealogy of the Komnenoi] (PDF) (in Greek). Vol. A1. Thessaloniki: Centre for Byzantine Studies, University of Thessaloniki.
- Varzos, Konstantinos (1984). Η Γενεαλογία των Κομνηνών [The Genealogy of the Komnenoi] (PDF) (in Greek). Vol. B. Thessaloniki: Centre for Byzantine Studies, University of Thessaloniki.
