= Eirene the Sebastokratorissa =

12th-century wife of a Byzantine emperor

Eirene
- Sebastokratorissa
- Born: 1110/2
- Died: 1152/3
- Spouse: Andronikos Komnenos (m. 1125; died 1142)
- Issue: Maria Komnene; John Doukas Komnenos; Theodora Komnene, Duchess of Austria; Eudokia Komnene; Alexios Komnenos

Eirene the Sebastokratorissa (Greek: Εἰρήνη, Eirḗnē; c. 1110/2 – c. 1152/3) was the wife of the sebastokrator Andronikos Komnenos, second son of the east Roman emperor John II Komnenos. Eirene was a notable patron of the arts, including in her intellectual circle the likes of John Tzetzes, Constantine Manasses and Theodore Prodromos. Because of her unknown identity, modern scholarship identifies Eirene as 'the sebastokratorissa' after her husband's title.

== Biography ==
Little is known of Eirene's early life. Michael and Elizabeth Jeffreys proposed a Norman origin for Eirene owing to her 'Aeneiadic' ancestry referenced in an anonymous encomium for her. Eirene married the sebastokrator Andronikos Komnenos, second son of emperor John II Komnenos around 1124/5, possibly in order to forge a marriage alliance with her Norman relatives in Italy or Antioch. The couple had five children together before Andronikos' death in 1142.

After John's death the following year, Eirene attracted the hostility of her brother-in-law Manuel I Komnenos possibly because of anti-Norman sentiment at the imperial court, being twice imprisoned c. 1143 and for a longer period c. 1147. However, Eirene's children were deeply involved in Manuel's regime and her eldest son the protosebastos John Doukas Komnenos served as a potential heir to the throne before the birth of Manuel's daughter in 1152. Eirene passed away around this time.

== Children ==
- John Doukas Komnenos (1126 – 17 September 1176), who married (first name unknown) Taronitissa, and had several daughters, including Maria, the future Queen of Jerusalem, and a son, Manuel.
- Maria Komnene (born 1127), who married Theodoros Dasiotes, then John Kantakouzenos, with offspring from the latter.
- Eudokia Komnene (born c. 1129), who married an unknown first husband and then Michael Gabras, with offspring from the latter. She was also one of the mistresses of Andronikos I Komnenos.
- Theodora Komnene (c. 1132 – 3 January 1184), who married Henry II Jasomirgott, with offspring.
- Alexios Komnenos, who was married to Maria Doukaina, and had a daughter, Eudokia, and two short-lived sons. He is believed to have had Empress-dowager Maria of Antioch (widow of Manuel I) as a mistress. He headed the regency council for her son, Alexios II.

== Sources ==
- Jeffreys, Michael; Jeffreys, Elizabeth (1994). "Who was Eirene the Sevastokratorissa?". Byzantion (1): 40–68.
- Jeffreys, Elizabeth (2012). "The Sebastokratorissa Irene as Patron". Wiener Jahrbuch für Kunstgeschichte. 60 (1): 177–194.
- Varzos, Konstantinos (1984). Η Γενεαλογία των Κομνηνών [The Genealogy of the Komnenoi] (PDF) (in Greek). Vol. A1. Thessaloniki: Centre for Byzantine Studies, University of Thessaloniki.
- Varzos, Konstantinos (1984). Η Γενεαλογία των Κομνηνών [The Genealogy of the Komnenoi] (PDF) (in Greek). Vol. B. Thessaloniki: Centre for Byzantine Studies, University of Thessaloniki.
