= Isaac Komnenos =

Isaac Komnenos may refer to:

- Isaac I Komnenos (c. 1007 – 1060), Byzantine general and emperor in 1057–1059
- Isaac Komnenos (brother of Alexios I) (c. 1050 – 1102/1104), nephew of Isaac I Komnenos and elder brother of Alexios I
- Isaac Komnenos (son of Alexios I) (16 January 1093 – after 1152), son of Byzantine emperor Alexios I Komnenos and Irene Doukaina
- Isaac Komnenos (son of John II) (1113–?), son of Byzantine emperor John II Komnenos and Piroska of Hungary
- Isaac Komnenos of Cyprus (c. 1155 – 1195/1196)
