= Patriarch Michael of Constantinople =

Patriarch Michael of Constantinople may refer to:

- Patriarch Michael I of Constantinople, Ecumenical Patriarch in 1043–1058
- Michael II of Constantinople, Ecumenical Patriarch in 1143–1146
- Michael III of Constantinople, Ecumenical Patriarch in 1170–1178
- Michael IV of Constantinople, Ecumenical Patriarch in 1207–1213
