= Mikhaēl III =

Mikhaēl III may refer to:

- Michael III (840–867), Byzantine Emperor
- Michael III of Anchialus, Patriarch of Constantinople in 1170–1177
