= Theodosius I (disambiguation) =

Theodosius I (347–395) was Roman Emperor from 379 to 395.

Theodosius I may also refer to:

- Pope Theodosius I of Alexandria (died 567), Patriarch of Alexandria, 535–567
- Theodosius I of Constantinople, (died after 1183), Ecumenical Patriarch of Constantinople, 1179–1183
- Teodósio I, Duke of Braganza (1510–1563), Portuguese duke

== See also ==
- Theodosius (disambiguation), a given name, including a list of people with that name
