= Patriarch Theodosius I =

Patriarch Theodosius I may refer to:

- Patriarch Theodosius I of Alexandria, ruled in 535–536
- Theodosius I of Constantinople, Ecumenical Patriarch in 1179–1183
