= Patriarch Dositheos =

Patriarch Dositheos may refer to:

- Patriarch Dositheos I of Jerusalem, Greek Orthodox Patriarch of Jerusalem in 1190–1191
- Patriarch Dositheos II of Jerusalem, Greek Orthodox Patriarch of Jerusalem in 1669–1707
