= Patriarch Constantine of Constantinople =

Patriarch Constantine of Constantinople may refer to:

- Constantine I of Constantinople, Ecumenical Patriarch in 675–677
- Constantine II of Constantinople, Ecumenical Patriarch in 754–766
- Constantine III of Constantinople, Ecumenical Patriarch in 1059–1063
- Constantine IV of Constantinople, Ecumenical Patriarch in 1154–1156
- Constantine V of Constantinople, Ecumenical Patriarch in 1897–1901
- Constantine VI of Constantinople, Ecumenical Patriarch in 1924–1925
