= Patriarch Theodotus of Constantinople =

Patriarch Theodotus of Constantinople may refer to:

- Theodotus I of Constantinople, Ecumenical Patriarch in 815–821
- Theodotus II of Constantinople, Ecumenical Patriarch in 1151–1153
