= Mikhaēl II =

Mikhaēl II may refer to:

- Michael II, Byzantine Emperor (died in 829)
- Patriarch Michael II of Constantinople (ruled 1143–1146)
- Michael II Komnenos Doukas (died in 1266/68)
