= Kokkinobaphos Master =

Name for a 12th century miniaturist active in Constantinople

St Mark, from Great Lavra MS A44

The Kokkinobaphos Master is the conventional name by which modern historians call a master miniaturist active in Constantinople, the capital of the Byzantine Empire, during the 12th century.

The name was given to the unknown artist by Jeffrey C. Anderson, His first known works, the manuscripts Paris gr. 75 (at the National Library of France) and Vat. Urb. gr. 2 (at the Vatican Library), date to the 1120s. Later works, representative of his mature style, are the Vatican copy of the homilies of James the Monk of Kokkinobaphos (Vat. gr. 1162) executed for the wife of the sebastokrator Andronikos Komnenos, and the so-called "Seraglio Octateuch" (Topkapi gr. 8). The former work has given the painter his name, and is considered as his "grandest creation" and "the longest visual biography of the Virgin ever produced in Byzantium". Other works by the master include the Burney Gospels in the British Library.

He represents "the last Stylistically coherent group of manuscripts known from Constantinople before the city was sacked during the Fourth Crusade in 1204".

== Sources ==
- Anderson, Jeffrey C. (1982). "The Seraglio Octateuch and the Kokkinobaphos Master". Dumbarton Oaks Papers. 36. Dumbarton Oaks: 83–114. doi:10.2307/1291463. JSTOR 1291463.
- Evans, Helen C.; Wixom, William D. (eds.). The Glory of Byzantium: Art and Culture of the Middle Byzantine Era, A.D. 843–1261. New York: The Metropolitan Museum of Art.
- Linardou, Kallirroe (2004). Reading two Byzantine illustrated books: the Kokkinobaphos Manuscripts (Vaticanus graecus 1162, Parisinus graecus 1208) and their illustration (PhD thesis). University of Birmingham.
- Linardou, Kallirroe (2007). "The Kokkinobaphos Manuscripts Revisited: The Internal Evidence of the Books". Scriptorium. 61 (2): 384–407. doi:10.3406/scrip.2007.4228.
