= Patriarch Theodotus =

Patriarch Theodotus may refer to:

- Theodotus of Antioch, patriarch of Antioch in 420–429
- Theodotus I of Constantinople, Ecumenical Patriarch in 815–821
- Theodotus II of Constantinople, Ecumenical Patriarch in 1151–1153
