= Seraglio Octateuch =

12th-century Byzantine illuminated manuscript

The Topkapı or Seraglio Octateuch (TSMK G.İ. 8, formerly Constantinopolitanus graecus 8) is a 12th-century Byzantine illuminated manuscript of the Octateuch. It is named after its location in the library of the Topkapı Palace in Istanbul, the former residence ("seraglio") of the Ottoman sultans. It was commissioned by the Byzantine prince Isaac Komnenos, and remained unfinished due to the latter's death.

== Description ==
The manuscript was first studied by Fyodor Uspensky, who published his research in L'Octateuque de la Bibliothèque du Sérail à Constantinople (Sofia 1907). Based on a handwritten inscription, Uspensky identified the original patron of the manuscript as the porphyrogennetos Isaac Komnenos (1093–after 1152), the youngest son of Emperor Alexios I Komnenos (r. 1081–1118) brother of John II Komnenos (r. 1118–1143) and uncle of Manuel I Komnenos (r. 1143–1180). This identification has been commonly accepted. Isaac spent much of his life in exile or prison, so that the most likely period of his commissioning the work is the period from 1143 to about 1152, the last year in which he is known to have been alive. A later date is more likely, since the work remained unfinished; it was probably abandoned after Isaac's death around 1152.

The surviving manuscript is probably the original. Its 569 folios measure 42.2 × 31.8 cm, making it the largest, both in dimensions and number of pages, among the six surviving Byzantine Octateuchs. Only the Vatopedi Octateuch, which is assumed to be part of a two-volume Octateuch, is larger, but only the second volume of 470 folios survives. The Seraglio Octateuch contains 314 illustrations, of which 278 are unfinished; there are 86 blank spaces reserved for miniatures that were never begun.

Uniquely, the Seraglio Octateuch is prefaced by a paraphrase of the Letter of Aristeas, which according to the handwritten introduction was composed (and possibly hand-written) by Isaac himself.

== Illustrations ==
The illustrations were undertaken by a group of painters. According to historian Jeffrey C. Anderson, about 190 scenes were executed by the so-called "Kokkinobaphos Master", widely considered the leading master of mid-12th-century Constantinople. His work is also present in other well-known works of the period, notably the homilies on the Virgin Mary by James the Monk (Vat. gr. 1162), commissioned by Irene, wife of Isaac's nephew, the sebastokrator Andronikos Komnenos. According to Anderson, the Seraglio Octateuch represents that painter's mature phase, characterized by "a growing expressiveness and monumentality, achieved partly through a simple increase in figure scale and partly through the heightened emotional intensity reflected in the faces". The rest were painted by two different authors, Painter A and Painter B, of whom Anderson estimates the former to have been the more proficient.

Anderson also points to the probable contribution of the "Kokkinobaphos Master" in the original illuminations of the Smyrna Octateuch, and the strong stylistic influences by that master in one of two Octateuchs held in the Vatican Library, Vat. gr. 746. Due to the strong similarities in the selection and composition of certain scenes between these three, it is possible that they rely on a common, now lost, model probably executed in the mid-11th century.

== Sources ==
- Anderson, Jeffrey C. (1982). "The Seraglio Octateuch and the Kokkinobaphos Master". Dumbarton Oaks Papers. 36. Dumbarton Oaks: 83–114. doi:10.2307/1291463. JSTOR 1291463.
- Linardou, Kallirroe (2016). "Imperial impersonations: Disguised portraits of a Komnenian prince and his father". In Bucossi, Alessandra; Rodriguez Suarez, Alex (eds.). John II Komnenos, Emperor of Byzantium: In the Shadow of Father and Son. London: Routledge. pp. 155–182. ISBN 978-1-4724-6024-0.
- Takiguchi, Mika (2017). "The Octateuch". In Tsamakda, Vasiliki (ed.). A Companion to Byzantine Illustrated Manuscripts. Brill. pp. 214–226. ISBN 978-90-04-34318-4.
