= Michael III (disambiguation) =

Michael III was the Byzantine emperor in 842–867.

Michael III may also refer to:

- Pope Michael III of Alexandria, ruled in 880–907
- Michael III of Constantinople, ruled in 1170–1178
- Michael III of Duklja, Prince of Duklja, from c. 1170 to 1186

== See also ==
- Michael (disambiguation)
