= Constantine IV (disambiguation) =

Constantine IV was Eastern Roman Emperor from 668 to 685.

Constantine IV may also refer to:

- Constantine IV of Constantinople, Patriarch of Constantinople from 1154 to 1156
- Constantine IV, King of Armenia, ruled 1362–1373
- Constantine IV, Prince of Mukhrani, ruled as last Prince of Mukhrani in 1801
