= Theodore Balsamon =

12th century Patriarch of Antioch

Theodore Balsamon, also called Balsamo, (Greek: Θεόδωρος Βαλσαμῶν) was a canonist of the Eastern Orthodox Church and 12th-century Eastern Orthodox Patriarch of Antioch.

== Biography ==
Born in the second half of the 12th century at Constantinople; died there, after 1195 (Petit). He was ordained a deacon, appointed nomophylax, and from 1178 to 1183, under Patriarch Theodosius I, he had charge of all ecclesiastical trials or cases submitted to the Patriarchate. In 1193 he became the Patriarch of Antioch, though he remained resident in Constantinople.

Balsamon's best work is his "Scholia" (Greek: Σχόλια) (c. 1170), a commentary on the Nomocanon of Photios, the standard work on Eastern Orthodox ecclesiastical and imperial laws and decrees, commissioned by the Emperor Manuel I and the Patriarch Michael III. In his "Scholia", Balsamon insists on existing laws, and dwells on the relation between canons and laws — ecclesiastical and civil constitutions — giving precedence to the former. Balsamon also compiled a collection of ecclesiastical constitutions (Syntagma) and wrote other works, many of which concern the ongoing debate between the Eastern and Western Churches following the schism of 1054. Two of his letters were published: one treating of fasting, the other on the admission of novices into monasteries.

== Legacy ==
Theodore's legacy is that he preserved the world's knowledge of many otherwise unknown source documents from early Byzantine political and theological history. His commentaries are still referenced to this day by students of Eastern Orthodox canon law. Theodore also standardized the liturgical practices in usage in the Antiochian Church, to adopt the Byzantine Rite and to reject other Eastern Rites.

== Bibliography ==
Balsamon's Scholia was first published by Gentian Hervet in Latin at Paris (1561), at Basle (1562); in Greek and Latin at Paris (1615), and again at Basle (1620). It is also found in Beveridge's "Pandecta Canonum", Oxford, 1672 (P. G., cxxxvii-viii). From 1852 to 1860, Rhalli and Potli published at Athens a collection of the sources of Greek canon law which contains Balsamon's commentary. Migne published his commentaries in his Patrologia Graeca, CIV, 441.
