= Andronikos Komnenos (son of Alexios I) =

Byzantine prince and military commander (1091–1130/31)

- Sebastokrator of the Byzantine Empire
- Born: 18 September 1091; Constantinople
- Died: 1130/31; Asia Minor
- House: Komnenos
- Father: Alexios I Komnenos
- Mother: Irene Doukaina

Andronikos Komnenos (Greek: Ἀνδρόνικος Κομνηνός; 18 September 1091 – 1130/31) was a Byzantine prince and military commander. The second-born son of Emperor Alexios I Komnenos, he was named sebastokrator and participated in the Battle of Philomelion (1116) against the Seljuk Turks. He opposed the succession of his older brother John II Komnenos to the throne in 1118, but was allowed to remain at court, and served in at least two of John II's campaigns in the Balkans. He died of an illness in 1130/31. His wife and offspring are relatively obscure, and may have died early.

== Life ==
Andronikos Komnenos was the fourth child and second son of the Byzantine emperor Alexios I Komnenos (r. 1081–1118) and Empress Irene Doukaina, and was named after his maternal grandfather. As his parents were reigning at the time of his birth, he was accorded the appellation porphyrogennetos. The commonly accepted date of his birth is that given by the Codex Mosquensis 53/147 manuscript, 18 September 1091, but according to Skoulatos, the narrative of the Alexiad, written by his oldest sister Anna Komnene, seems to indicate that in 1116 he was still an adolescent, which would put his birth around the year 1099/1100.

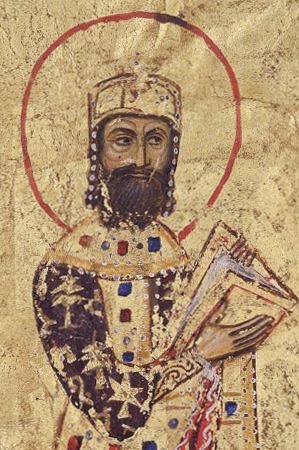
Portrait of the father of Andronikos, Emperor Alexios I Komnenos, from a 12th-century Greek manuscript

Following the death of his uncle Isaac Komnenos sometime in 1102–04, he succeeded him to the high title of sebastokrator. According to Zonaras, this followed his marriage, which occurred after he came of age. In 1116, Andronikos commanded the left wing of his father's army at the Battle of Philomelion against the Seljuk Turks. During the battle he led a daring pursuit of the Turks, capturing the tent of the Sultan of Iconium, Malikshah. In the Alexiad this feat is accompanied with Andronikos' epitaph, which has led several scholars to erroneously claim that he was killed during the battle.

When Alexios lay dying in August 1118, due to his close relationship with his sister, Andronikos sided with Anna and his mother, who schemed to place Anna's husband, Nikephoros Bryennios the Younger, on the throne, rather than his older brother, John II Komnenos. Nevertheless, John pardoned him and allowed him to remain at court. In 1122, he again led troops in his brother's campaign against the Pechenegs. According to a monody by Michael Italikos, he was crucial in turning the tide of the battle and securing a victory for the Byzantines, by rallying the retreating troops, and even threatening the army's standard-bearer with immediate execution if he did not stand his ground. According to another monody by Theodore Prodromos, he also participated in John II's victorious expedition against Stephen II of Hungary in 1129.

He died following a long illness in Asia Minor in 1130 or 1131. His mother and Nikephoros Bryennios escorted his body to Constantinople. During the crossing of the Bosporus, the ship carrying the body and its entourage was nearly sunk by a sudden storm, but arrived safely in the capital. Following an elaborate public funeral, he was probably buried in the Monastery of Christ Philanthropos, alongside his father. Michael Italikos and Theodore Prodromos each wrote a monody in his honour, and Prodromos also wrote another long poem to console his mother Irene Doukaina. His close relationship with his sister and mother has ensured a very favourable treatment of Andronikos in both the Alexiad and in the works of the two court poets, who belonged to the Empress-mother's court circle.

== Family ==
His wife Irene, in all likelihood a Slavic princess, was possibly the daughter of Volodar of Peremyshl, whom the Primary Chronicle indicates as being the subject of marriage negotiations between Alexios and Volodar in 1104. She had an exceptional beauty according to the court poet Theodore Prodromos. She was also a patron of the arts, and she commissioned the Synopsis Chronike of Constantine Manasses. Varzos dated her death to around 1122, but modern scholars now date her death to 1153. The couple had one known child, Alexios, who died in childhood shortly before his mother, around 1120.

It is possible that Andronikos remarried, as a poem from Codex marcianus 524 records a sebastokrator Andronikos and his wife, the sebastokratorissa Anna, but the two Andronikoi are most likely distinct persons. Andronikos is also reported as the father of another son, John Doukas, who is mentioned only in a list of participants for a Church synod on 6 March 1166. He is also recorded as having a daughter Maria, and possibly a second daughter Anna. If their mother was Irene, the absence of both daughters from the monodies may possibly be due to either the poets' emphasizing male descent, or to their death in early infancy.

== Sources ==
- Boeck, Elena (2015). Imagining the Byzantine Past. Cambridge University Press. ISBN 9781107085817.
- Kouroupou, Matoula; Vannier, Jean-François (2005). "Commémoraisons des Comnènes dans le typikon liturgique du monastère du Christ Philanthrope (ms. Panaghia Kamariotissa 29)" [Commemorations of the Komnenoi in the liturgical typikon of the Monastery of Christ Philanthropos (ms. Panaghia Kamariotissa 29)]. Revue des études byzantines (in French). 63: 41–69. doi:10.3406/rebyz.2005.2305.
- Skoulatos, Basile (1980). Les personnages byzantins de l'Alexiade: Analyse prosopographique et synthèse [The Byzantine Personalities of the Alexiad: Prosopographical Analysis and Synthesis] (in French). Louvain-la-Neuve and Louvain: Bureau du Recueil Collège Érasme and Éditions Nauwelaerts.
- Varzos, Konstantinos (1984). Η Γενεαλογία των Κομνηνών [The Genealogy of the Komnenoi] (PDF) (in Greek). Vol. A1. Thessaloniki: Centre for Byzantine Studies, University of Thessaloniki.
- Venning, Timothy; Frankopan, Peter (2015). A Chronology of the Crusades. Routledge. ISBN 9781317496427.

Preceded by Isaac Komnenos	Sebastokrator of the Byzantine Empire c. 1105–1130/31; With: Isaac Komnenos (from 1118), Andronikos Komnenos (from 1122), Isaac Komnenos (from 1122), Manuel Komnenos (from 1122)	Succeeded by Isaac Komnenos, Andronikos Komnenos, Isaac Komnenos, Manuel Komnenos
