= Theodore Pantechnes =

Theodore Pantechnes (Greek: Θεόδωρος Παντέχνης) was a senior Byzantine official under Manuel I Komnenos (r. 1143–1180) and the regency for Alexios II Komnenos (rr. 1180–1183).

Pantechnes occupied the post of epi ton oikeiakon, head of the main fiscal department of the Byzantine government, continuously from 1148 until 1182. At the same time, he also held a succession of high judicial offices, beginning as koiaistor in 1164, advancing to dikaiodotes by ca. 1166, and finally becoming Eparch of Constantinople in 1182.

== Sources ==
- Magdalino, Paul (2002) [1993]. The Empire of Manuel I Komnenos, 1143–1180. Cambridge: Cambridge University Press. ISBN 0-521-52653-1.
