= Battle of Philomelion (1116) =

1116 battle in present-day Turkey

Coordinates: 38°21′27″N 31°24′59″E

- Part of the Byzantine-Seljuk wars
Date	Autumn 1116
Location	Philomelion, Asia Minor
Result	Byzantine victory

Belligerents
Byzantine Empire	Sultanate of Rum

Commanders and leaders
Alexios I Komnenos; Andronikos Komnenos; Nikephoros Bryennios	Sultan Malik Shah

The Battle of Philomelion (Latinised as Philomelium - modern Akşehir) of 1116 consisted of a series of clashes over a number of days between a Byzantine expeditionary army under Emperor Alexios I Komnenos and the forces of the Sultanate of Rûm under Sultan Malik Shah; it occurred in the course of the Byzantine–Seljuk wars. The Seljuk forces attacked the Byzantine army a number of times to no effect; having suffered losses to his army in the course of these attacks, Malik Shah sued for peace.

== Background ==
Following the success of the First Crusade, the Byzantine armed forces, led by John Doukas the megas doux, reconquered the Aegean coastline and much of the interior of western Anatolia. However, after the failure of the Crusade of 1101, the Seljuq and Danishmend Turks resumed their offensive operations against the Byzantines. Following their defeats, the Seljuqs under Malik Shah had recovered control of central Anatolia, re-consolidating a viable state around the city of Iconium. Emperor Alexios I Komnenos, aged and suffering from an illness which proved to be terminal, was unable to prevent Turkish raids into the recovered areas of Byzantine Anatolia, though an attempt to take Nicaea in 1113 was thwarted by the Byzantines. In 1116 Alexios was able to personally take the field and was engaged in defensive operations in northwest Anatolia. Basing his army at Lopadion, and later at Nicomedia, he succeeded in defeating raiding Turks in a minor battle at Poemanenon. After receiving reinforcements to his army Alexios decided to move onto the offensive.

== Byzantine advance to Philomelion ==
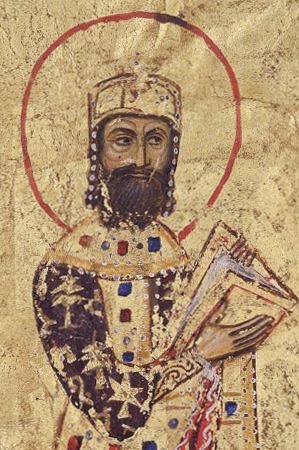
Emperor Alexios I

In the campaign of Philomelion Alexios led a sizeable Byzantine army deep into the Anatolian interior. Anna Komnene, the primary source for the campaign, implies that the Seljuq capital of Iconium was the goal of the expedition, but evidently Alexios abandoned this plan and contented himself with staging a conspicuous show of force and evacuating the native Christian population from the Turkish dominated areas his army passed through. The Byzantines were to employ a new battle formation of Alexios' devising, the parataxis. Anna Komnene's description of this formation is so imprecise as to be useless. However, from her account of the army in action the nature of the parataxis is revealed; it was a defensive formation, a hollow square with the baggage in the centre, infantry on the outside and cavalry in-between, from whence they could mount attacks. An ideal formation for tackling the fluid Turkish battle tactics, reliant on swarm attacks by horse-archers. A similar formation was later employed by Richard I of England at the Battle of Arsuf.

The Byzantines moved through Santabaris, sending detachments via Polybotos and Kedros, and, after dispersing Turkish resistance, took Philomelion by assault. Parties of scouts were then sent out to round up the local Christian population for evacuation to areas under firm Byzantine control.

== Battle ==
Alexios became aware that a substantial Seljuq army was approaching from the north and began his retreat to his own territory. His army resumed its defensive formation with the civilians accompanying the baggage in the centre. The Turks, under an officer called Manalugh, were initially baffled by the Byzantine formation and did not attack with any vigour. However, the following day Sultan Malik Shah arrived and the Byzantines were attacked in earnest. The Turks mounted a simultaneous attack on the van and rear of the Byzantine army. The Byzantine cavalry made two counterattacks, the first seems to have been unsuccessful. A further counterattack was more fortunate, led by Nikephoros Bryennios the Younger (Anna Komnene's husband and Alexios' son-in-law) the leader of the Byzantine right wing, it broke that part of the Turkish force led in person by the Sultan, which then turned to flight. Malik Shah narrowly escaped capture. The Seljuqs then made a night attack, but the Byzantine dispositions again frustrated them. The following day Malik Shah again attacked, his troops completely surrounding the Byzantine army on all sides. The Turks were once more repulsed with loss, having achieved nothing. The next day Malik-Shah sent to Alexios with proposals for peace.

== Aftermath ==
Alexios and Malik Shah met, Alexios throwing his own costly cloak around the sultan's shoulders. A peace involving an undertaking by Malik Shah to stop Turkish raiding and an admission by the sultan of some measure of, largely theoretical, dependence on the Byzantine emperor was made. Anna Komnene records that the peace treaty involved an undertaking by Malik Shah to evacuate Anatolia, but this is unlikely in the extreme and must represent hyperbole on her part. The campaign was remarkable for the high level of discipline shown by the Byzantine army. Alexios had demonstrated that he could march his army with impunity through Turkish dominated territory. The reverse suffered by Malik Shah at Philomelion and the consequent loss of prestige probably contributed to his demise as he was soon deposed, blinded and eventually murdered by his brother Mas'ud. Alexios' death in 1118 meant that the ambition of reconquering all of Asia Minor was left to his 31-year-old son, John II Komnenos.

== See also ==
- Komnenian Byzantine army
- Komnenian restoration
