= Luke Chrysoberges =

Ecumenical Patriarch of Constantinople from 1157 to 1169

- Ecumenical Patriarch of Constantinople
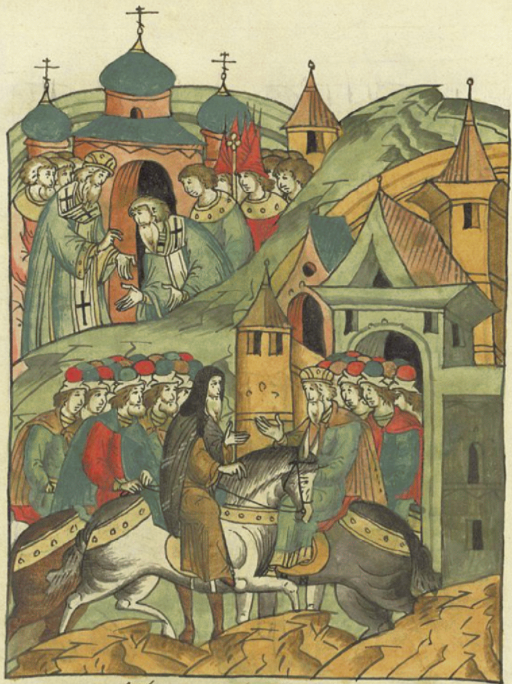
- Church: Church of Constantinople
- In office: August/October 1157 – November 1169
- Predecessor: Constantine IV of Constantinople
- Successor: Michael III of Constantinople

Personal details
- Died: November 1169
- Denomination: Eastern Orthodoxy

Luke Chrysoberges (Greek: Λουκᾶς Χρυσοβέργης; (Note: Chrysoberges meaning "golden wand") died November 1169) was Ecumenical Patriarch of Constantinople between 1157 and 1169.

== Ordained ministry ==
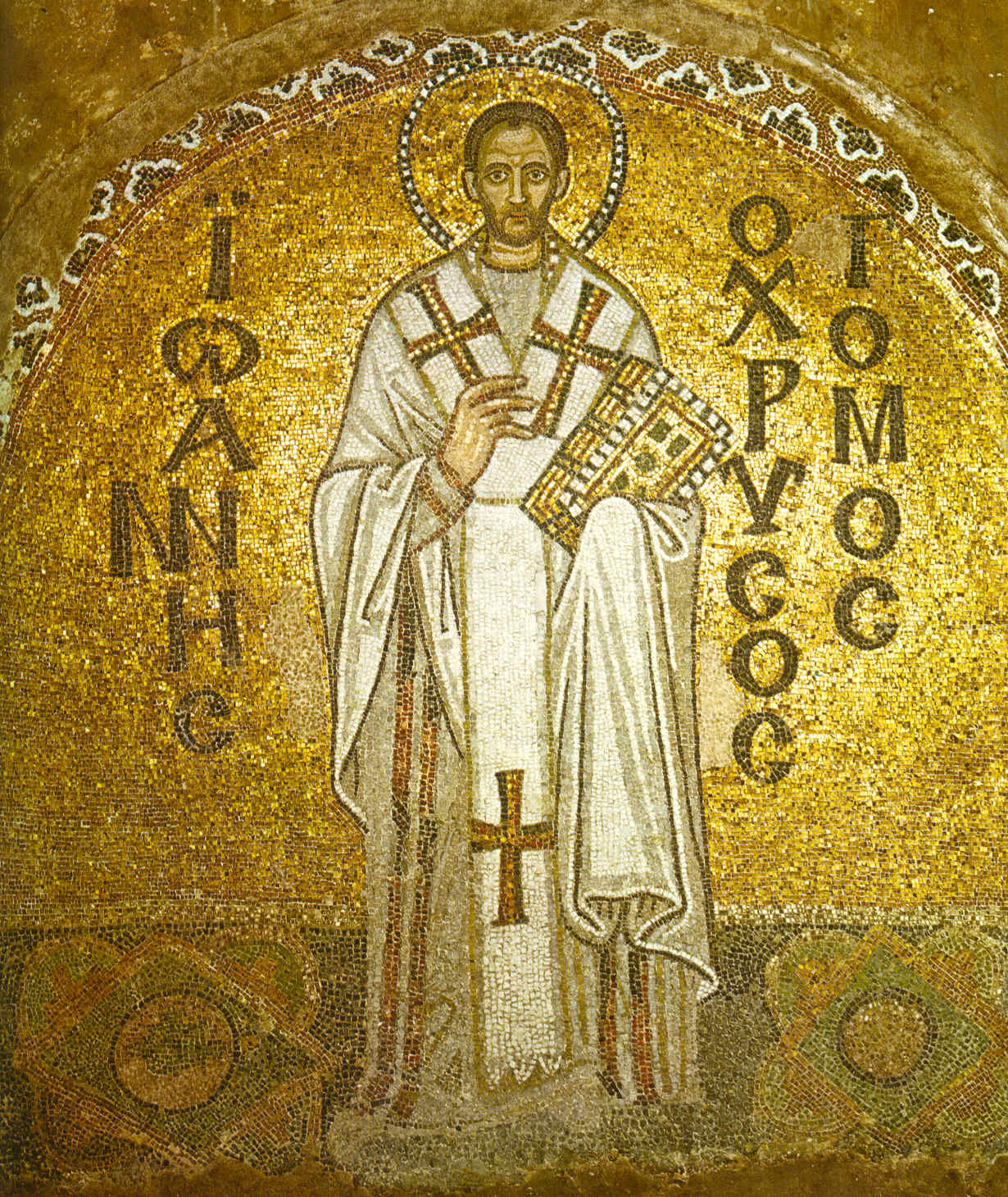
A millennium-old Byzantine mosaic of John Chrysostom (Hagia Sophia) – The controversy of 1156–1157 was about the interpretation of John's liturgy for the Eucharist, "Thou art He who offers and is offered and receives".

During Luke's patriarchate, several other major theological controversies occurred. In 1156–1157 the question was raised, whether Christ had offered himself as a sacrifice for the sins of the world to the Father and to the Holy Spirit only, or also to the Logos (i.e., to himself). In the end, a synod held at Constantinople in 1157 adopted a compromise formula, that the Word made flesh offered a double sacrifice to the Holy Trinity, despite the dissidence of Patriarch of Antioch-elect Soterichus Panteugenus. During his term the theological issue of the relation between the Son and the Father in the Holy Trinity first appeared. The issue was created due to the explanation that one Demetrius of Lampi (in Phrygia) gave to the phrase of the Gospel of John «ὁ Πατήρ μου μείζων μου ἐστίν», which means my Father is bigger than me (John, XIV.29), Chrysoberges, at the behest of the Emperor Manuel I Komnenos, convened several meetings of the synod in 1166 to solve the problem, which condemned as heretical the explanations of Demetrius and the laity that followed him. Those who refused to submit to the synod's decisions had their property confiscated or were exiled. The political dimensions of this controversy are apparent from the fact that a leading dissenter from the Emperor's doctrine was his nephew Alexios Kontostephanos.

Other heresies continued to flourish in Byzantine possessions in Europe, including Bogomils, Paulicians, and Monophysites which Luke and his successors had difficulty in suppressing.

Luke was also involved in a process of the Church trying to extract itself from too close an association with the secular life of the state. In 1115, the patriarch John IX of Constantinople had sought to prevent clerics acting as advocates in lay courts. In December 1157, Luke extended this prohibition to all "worldly" occupations. In a still-extant cannon, he wrote: "We have observed that some of those enrolled in the clergy have uncanonically involved themselves in worldly affairs. Some have taken on posts as curators or overseers of aristocratic houses and estates; others have undertaken the collection of public taxes... others have accepted dignities and magistracies assigned to the civil establishment... we enjoin such people to desist from now on from all the aforesaid occupations, and to devote themselves to ecclesiastical exigencies..." Such a separation of church and state was key to preserve the church from undue secular influence over matters it considered strictly clerical. This was especially key at the time as the rule of the Emperor Manuel I Komnenos was noted for its autocratic style and caesaropapism, and though idiosyncratic, generally made the patriarchate subservient directly to the needs of the state.

== Bibliography ==
- Οικουμενικό Πατριαρχείο.
- Joan M. Hussey, The Orthodox Church in the Byzantine Empire, Oxford University Press, 1986.
- Kurtz, Johann Heinrich (1860). "Dogmatic Controversies, 12th and 14th Centuries". History of the Christian Church to the Reformation. T&T Clark.
- Magdalino, Paul (2002) [1993]. The Empire of Manuel I Komnenos, 1143–1180 (Second ed.). Cambridge: Cambridge University Press. ISBN 9780521526531.

Eastern Orthodox Church titles
Preceded by Constantine IV	Ecumenical Patriarch of Constantinople; 1157 – 1169	Succeeded by Michael III
