= Isaac Komnenos (son of John II) =

- Porphyrogennetos

Sebastokrator of the Byzantine Empire
- Reign: 1122 – after 1146
- Emperors: John II Komnenos; Alexios Komnenos; Manuel I Komnenos
- Born: c. 1113
- Died: after 1146
- Spouse: Theodora; Irene Diplosynadene
- Issue more...: Maria, Queen of Hungary; Theodora, Queen of Jerusalem; Eudokia, Lady of Montpellier
- House: Komnenos
- Father: John II Komnenos
- Mother: Irene of Hungary

Isaac Komnenos or Comnenus (Greek: Ἰσαάκιος Κομνηνός, romanized: Isaakios Komnēnos; c. 1113 – after 1146), was the third son of Byzantine Emperor John II Komnenos by Irene of Hungary. He was bypassed by his father in favour of his younger brother Manuel I Komnenos for the succession, leading to a tense relationship between the two brothers after. He participated in the campaigns of his father and brother in Asia Minor, and was a fervent adherent of Patriarch Cosmas II of Constantinople, but little else is known about his life.

== Early life ==
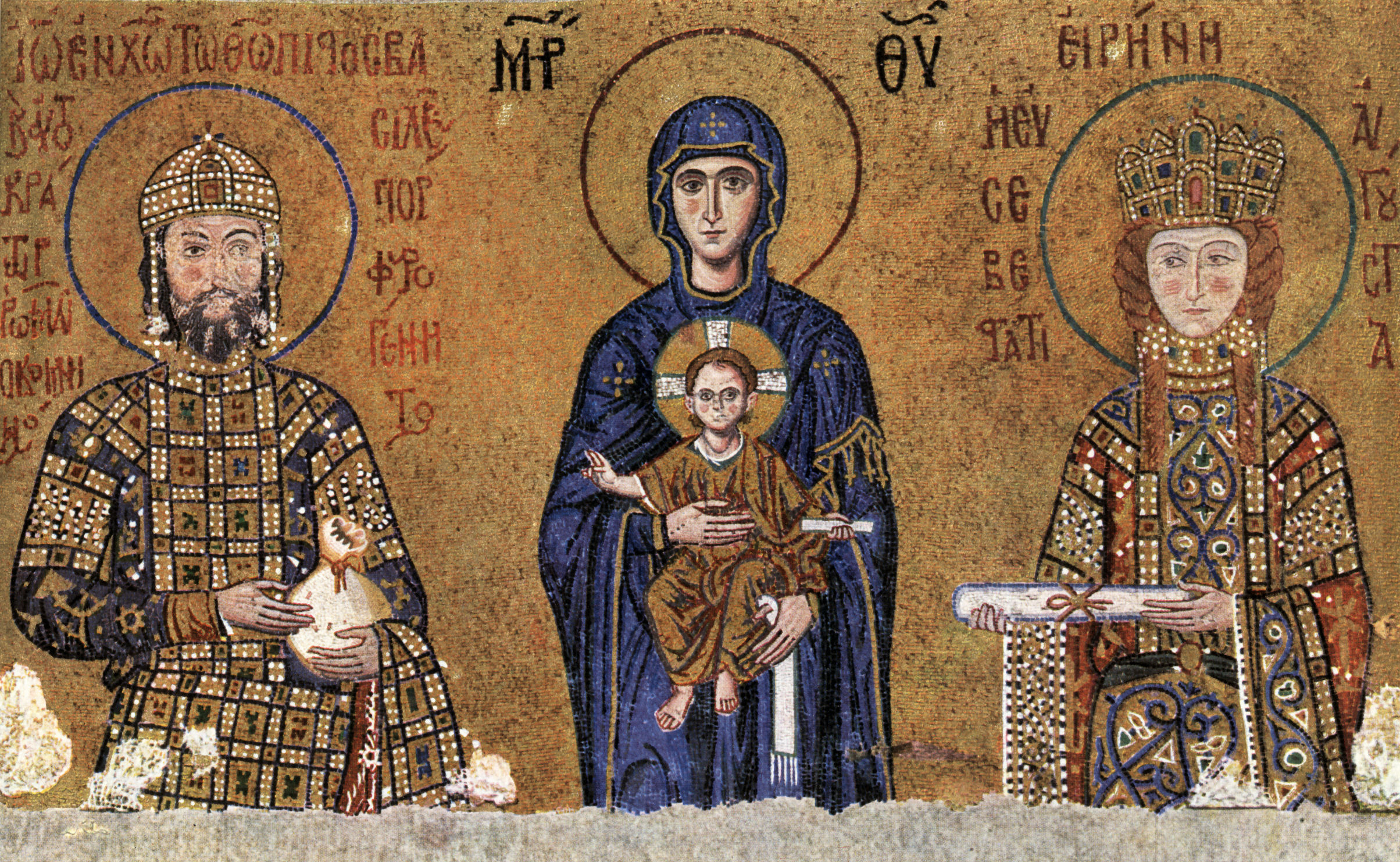
Isaac's parents, John II and Empress Irene, flanking the Madonna and Child, from a mosaic in the Hagia Sophia

Isaac Komnenos was born c. 1113 as the third son of the Byzantine emperor John II Komnenos (r. 1118–1143), and Irene of Hungary. When his oldest brother Alexios was crowned co-emperor in 1122, Isaac, along with his other brothers, was awarded the rank of sebastokrator by his father. He was a tall and imposing man, but, according to the Byzantine sources—who are admittedly partial to his youngest brother and eventual successor to John II, Manuel I Komnenos (r. 1143–1180)—prone to sudden outbursts of anger and harsh punishments, so that he was not much loved.

According to John Kinnamos, Isaac participated in the 1136 campaign against Armenian Cilicia, where, during the siege of Anazarbos, he counselled his father to dress the wooden siege engines with bricks, so as to thwart the defenders, who were throwing heated irons to set them on fire. This stratagem allowed the Byzantines to capture the city. In 1142, while taking part in another campaign by John II in southern Anatolia, both Alexios and then the second brother, Andronikos, unexpectedly died. Isaac, who had also taken part in the campaign and sent to escort Alexios' corpse along with Andronikos, accompanied the bodies of his brothers back to Constantinople.

== Succession ==
The deaths of his older brothers left Isaac as the obvious candidate for the succession, but shortly before his death on campaign in Cilicia in April 1143, John II Komnenos designated his fourth son Manuel as his heir, bypassing Isaac. The background for this nomination is unclear; contemporary Byzantine historians suggest that Manuel was more qualified, and stress that primogeniture was not decisive in Byzantine tradition. The contemporary Latin historian William of Tyre, on the other hand, plainly states that the main factor was Manuel's presence with the army and his ability to lead them safely home, while Isaac was away in Constantinople. According to William, the powerful megas domestikos (commander-in-chief of the army), John Axouch, John II's closest friend and aide, tried hard to persuade the emperor to nominate Isaac rather than Manuel, but once John made his decision, he steadfastly supported Manuel's claim.

Isaac's presence in Constantinople, with his access to the imperial palace and its treasures, including the regalia, posed a considerable threat to Manuel's position. According to Niketas Choniates, Manuel sent Axouch in all haste to assume control in Constantinople. Indeed, Axouch managed to arrive in the capital before news of John's death arrived, seized the palace, and prevented Isaac from making his own bid for the throne by shutting him up in the Pantokrator Monastery (founded by Isaac's parents). (Note: Paul Magdalino notes that of the major historians of the period, John Kinnamos is silent about Axouch's role, and William of Tyre credits an unnamed mystikos (majordomo) with preventing Isaac from seizing the throne. While it is plausible that Axouch obeyed the dying wish of his friend John II and acted to prevent civil strife, his relationship with Isaac was clearly closer and more complex than that portrayed in the Byzantine accounts. Hints of this can be also seen in their common stance during the brawl in 1146 (cf. last section).) Although many in the capital thought that Isaac was better fit to rule that his younger brother, he had to resign himself to Manuel's accession. After Manuel arrived in the city on 27 June, he felt himself secure enough to release his brother. The relationship between the brothers remained uneasy, however, as seen in the case of Patriarch Cosmas II of Constantinople. Isaac was a fervent admirer of the patriarch, and the latter was in turn accused in 1146/47 of conspiring to raise Isaac on the throne, which contributed to Manuel's decision to depose him in February 1147.

== Conflict ==
In 1145–1146, Isaac accompanied his brother on campaign against the Sultanate of Rum's capital, Konya, as one of the senior commanders of the army, along with John Axouch. According to John Kinnamos, at the emperor's table during that campaign a heated debate occurred, with comparisons being made between the martial qualities of Manuel and his father. John Axouch offensively extolled John II to the detriment of Manuel, and was vociferously supported by Manuel's brother Isaac. Tempers became inflamed and Isaac attacked his cousin, the future emperor Andronikos, with a sword. The blow was deflected by the emperor with the aid of another kinsman, leaving Manuel himself with a minor flesh wound. Isaac was punished by being banished from Manuel's presence for a few days, while Axouch lost the right to use the imperial seals, used to seal charters conferring imperial grants. (Note: The surviving text of Kinnamos is in poor state, and some earlier translators, including Ferdinand Chalandon and Charles M. Brand, preferred a different interpretation of the passage, placing this episode in 1154, omitting Axouch, and considering Isaac as the megas stratarches ("grand master of the army") mentioned by Kinnamos; in this emendation, furthermore, Isaac stole the imperial seals from Manuel. This passage has since been emended differently by Paul Magdalino to the version above.) Isaac is no longer mentioned after this, and his ultimate fate is unknown.

== Family ==
Isaac's first wife was named Theodora, but her family or life are unknown. She probably died c. 1142/43, leaving him free to marry a second time, to Irene Diplosynadene (meaning that both her parents hailed from the Synadenos family). From his first marriage Isaac had five children:

- Alexios (c. 1132 – before October 1136), died in infancy and is commemorated in the typikon of the Pantokrator Monastery founded by John II and a poem by Theodore Prodromos.
- A daughter, probably named Irene (born c. 1133), who married an unnamed Doukas Kamateros, a grandson of Gregory Kamateros and Irene Doukaina, a niece of Alexios I Komnenos. She was the mother of Isaac Komnenos of Cyprus.
- John (c. 1134 – before October 1136), died in infancy and is commemorated in the typikon of the Pantokrator Monastery founded by John II and a poem by Theodore Prodromos.
- A daughter, probably named Anna, who married the wealthy landowner and military commander Constantine Makrodoukas.
- Maria (born c. 1140), betrothed to Frederick I, Holy Roman Emperor, but eventually married in 1156 King Stephen IV of Hungary.

By his second wife, Isaac had two daughters:

- Theodora (born c. 1145 – after 1185), who married in 1158 King Baldwin III of Jerusalem and became the lover of the future emperor Andronikos I Komnenos after the death of her husband.
- Eudokia, who married William VIII of Montpellier.

== Sources ==
- Brand, Charles M., ed. (1976). Deeds of John and Manuel Comnenus, by John Kinnamos. New York: Columbia University Press. ISBN 0-231-04080-6.
- Magdalino, Paul (1987). "Isaac sebastokrator (III), John Axouch, and a case of mistaken identity". Byzantine and Modern Greek Studies. 11 (1): 207–214. doi:10.1179/030701387790203046. S2CID 162633202.
- Magdalino, Paul (2002) [1993]. The Empire of Manuel I Komnenos, 1143–1180 (Second ed.). Cambridge: Cambridge University Press. ISBN 9780521526531.
- Varzos, Konstantinos (1984). Η Γενεαλογία των Κομνηνών [The Genealogy of the Komnenoi] (PDF) (in Greek). Vol. A1. Thessaloniki: Centre for Byzantine Studies, University of Thessaloniki.
- Varzos, Konstantinos (1984). Η Γενεαλογία των Κομνηνών [The Genealogy of the Komnenoi] (PDF) (in Greek). Vol. B. Thessaloniki: Centre for Byzantine Studies, University of Thessaloniki.

Preceded by Andronikos Komnenos and Isaac Komnenos	Sebastokrator of the Byzantine Empire; 1122 – after 1146; With: Andronikos Komnenos (until 1130/31), Isaac Komnenos, Andronikos Komnenos (1122–1142), Manuel Komnenos (1122–1143)	Vacant Title next held by Alexios Komnenos
