= Theodora Komnene, Duchess of Austria =

Theodora Komnene
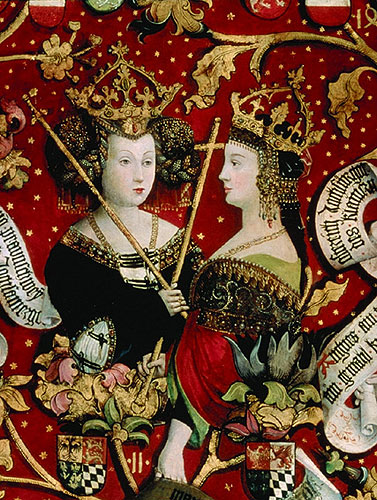
- Gertrude of Süpplingenburg and Theodora Komnene
- Born: Constantinople
- Died: 2 January 1184; Vienna
- Noble family: Komnenos
- Spouse: Henry II, Duke of Austria
- Issue: Agnes, Queen of Hungary; Leopold V, Duke of Austria
- Father: Andronikos Komnenos
- Mother: Eirene

Theodora Komnene (Greek: Θεοδώρα ἡ Κομνηνή, circa 1134 – 2 January 1184), Latinized Theodora Comnena, was a daughter of the Byzantine prince Andronikos Komnenos and his wife, Eirene (?Aineiadissa). Based on the writings of Niketas Choniates, it is likely Theodora was Andronikos' second daughter. The year of Theodora's birth is unknown.

== Life and Death ==
Little is known of Theodora's early life, except that her father died in 1142. She does not appear in the historical record again until the late 1140s, when she was betrothed to and married Henry II of Austria, whose first wife, Gertrude of Supplingenburg had died in 1143. The marriage had been arranged by her uncle, Manuel I and her eventual husband's half-brother, Conrad III of Germany, during the latter's stay in Constantinople.

Theodora and Henry were married in Constantinople, and subsequently granted the Duchy of Austria by Frederick I Barbarossa in 1156.

Theodora died on 2 January 1184.

== Family ==
Theodora had three children by her husband Henry:

- Agnès (?1154 – 13 January 1182) married to Stephen III of Hungary
- Leopold V, Duke of Austria (1157 – 31 December 1194)
- Henry I, Duke of Mödling (1158 – 31 August 1223) married Richeza of Bohemia, daughter of Vladislaus II, Duke of Bohemia.

== Ancestry ==
Family tree of Theodora

8. Alexios I Komnenos
4. John II Komnenos
9. Irene Doukaina
2. Andronikos Komnenos
10. Ladislaus I of Hungary
5. Piroska of Hungary
11. Adelaide of Swabia
1. Theodora Komnene
3. Eirene (?Aineiadissa)

== Sources ==
- Lyon, Jonathan R. (2013). Princely Brothers and Sisters: The Sibling Bond in German Politics, 1100–1250. Cornell University Press.
- Runciman, S.; A History of the Crusades, Vols. 1-3 (Penguin Books, 1978)
- Fuhrmann, H., (trans. Reuter, T.); Germany in the high middle ages c.1050-1200 (Cambridge University Press, 1995)
- Pertz, G. H. (ed.); Auctarium Zwetlensis et Continuatio (Hannover, 1851, 1925)
- Hereberg-Fränke, S. (ed.); Diocesis Salisburgensis Regiones Salisburgensis et Bavarica (Berlin, 1904)
- Johannes Preiser-Kapeller, Von Ostarrichi an den Bosporus. Ein Überblick zu den Beziehungen im Mittelalter (From Ostarrichi to the Bosporus: an overview of relations in the Middle Ages), in: Pro Oriente Jahrbuch 2010. Vienna 2011, p. 66-77
