= Leo of Constantinople =

Ecumenical Patriarch of Constantinople from 1134 to 1143

Saint Leo of Constantinople
- Ecumenical Patriarch of Constantinople
- Church: Church of Constantinople
- In office: May 1134 – 12 January 1143
- Predecessor: John IX of Constantinople
- Successor: Michael II of Constantinople

Personal details
- Died: 12 January 1143
- Denomination: Eastern Orthodoxy

Leo Styppes (Greek: Λέων Στυππῆς; died 12 January 1143) was Ecumenical Patriarch of Constantinople from May 1134 until his death on 12 January 1143. He was a presbyter at Hagia Sophia before his ascension. He reigned uneventfully during the rule of Byzantine emperor John II Komnenos.

== Notes and references ==
Eastern Orthodox Church titles
Preceded by John IX	Ecumenical Patriarch of Constantinople; 1134 – 1143	Succeeded by Michael II
