= Nicetas II of Constantinople =

Ecumenical Patriarch of Constantinople from 1186 to 1189

- Ecumenical Patriarch of Constantinople
- Church: Church of Constantinople
- In office: February 1186 – February 1189
- Predecessor: Basil II of Constantinople
- Successor: Dositheus of Constantinople

Personal details
- Born: Nicetas Mountanes
- Died: After 1189
- Denomination: Eastern Orthodoxy

Nicetas II Mountanes Greek: Νικήτας Μουντάνης; died after 1189) was Ecumenical Patriarch of Constantinople from February 1186 to February 1189. He was appointed by the Byzantine emperor Isaac II Angelos.

== Bibliography ==
- Grumel, Venance (1943). "La chronologie des patriarches de Constantinople de 1111 à 1206". Revue des études byzantines. 1: 250–270. doi:10.3406/rebyz.1943.909.
- Grumel, Venance (1958). Traité d'études byzantines - La chronologie. Vol. I. Paris: Presses Universitaires de France.
- Viton de Saint-Allais, Nicolas (1818). L'art de vérifier les dates. Vol. I. Paris.

Eastern Orthodox Church titles
Preceded by Basil II	Ecumenical Patriarch of Constantinople; 1186 – 1189	Succeeded by Dositheus
