= Neophytus I of Constantinople =

Ecumenical Patriarch of Constantinople in 1154

- Ecumenical Patriarch of Constantinople
- Church: Church of Constantinople
- In office: October 1154 – November 1154
- Predecessor: Theodotus II of Constantinople
- Successor: Constantine IV of Constantinople

Personal details
- Died: After 1154
- Denomination: Eastern Orthodoxy

Neophytus I of Constantinople (Greek: Νεόφυτος; died after 1154) was a 12th-century clergyman who served as Ecumenical Patriarch of Constantinople in 1154.

Neophytus was a monk at the Monastery of Theotokos the Benefactor before being elevated to the Patriarchal throne after the death in office of his predecessor. His short reign as Patriarch of Constantinople – of about a few weeks – was uneventful, and he retired to become an ascetic. His short reign was during the rule of Byzantine emperor Manuel I Komnenos.

== Bibliography ==
- Magdalino, Paul (2002) [1993]. The Empire of Manuel I Komnenos, 1143–1180 (Second ed.). Cambridge: Cambridge University Press. pp. 279–283. ISBN 9780521526531..

Eastern Orthodox Church titles
Preceded by Theodotus II	Ecumenical Patriarch of Constantinople; 1154	Succeeded by Constantine IV
