= Isaac Komnenos (son of Alexios I) =

- Porphyrogennetos
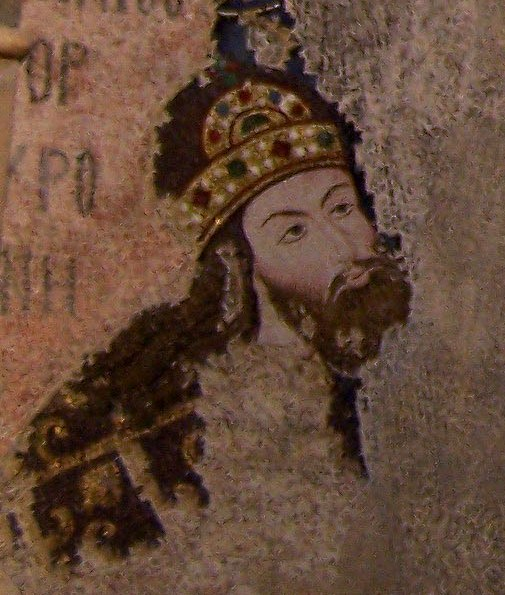
- Mosaic of Isaac Komnenos the porphyrogennetos from the Chora Church

Sebastokrator of the Byzantine Empire
- Tenure: 1118 – c. 1152
- Emperors: John II Komnenos; Manuel I Komnenos

Caesar of the Byzantine Empire
- Reign: 1104 – 1118
- Born: 16 January 1093; Constantinople
- Died: after 1152
- Issue: John Tzelepes Komnenos; Andronikos I Komnenos
- Dynasty: Komnenoi
- Father: Alexios I Komnenos
- Mother: Irene Doukaina

Isaac Komnenos or Comnenus (Greek: Ἰσαάκιος Κομνηνός, romanized: Isaakios Komnēnos; 16 January 1093 – after 1152) was the third son of Byzantine Emperor Alexios I Komnenos and Empress Irene Doukaina. He was raised to the high rank of sebastokrator by his older brother John II Komnenos in reward for his support, but they later fell out, as Isaac began to covet the throne.

In 1130, Isaac and his sons fled to exile after becoming involved in a conspiracy against John. For several years, they wandered in Asia Minor and the Levant, trying to gain support from the local rulers, which was ultimately in vain. John's military successes forced Isaac to seek a reconciliation with his brother in 1138, although he did not give up his designs on the throne. In 1139, after his oldest son defected to the Seljuk Turks, Isaac was exiled to Heraclea Pontica. During the succession struggle that followed John's death in 1143, he supported the unsuccessful candidacy of his elder nephew, likewise named Isaac, over his younger nephew Manuel I Komnenos.

Weakened by the onset of an illness, he was forced to retire from public life by Manuel in 1150. Isaac then devoted himself to the construction of the monastery of Theotokos Kosmosoteira at Bera (modern Feres) in western Thrace, where he was to be buried. Isaac was noted for his erudition and his patronage of learning, and is considered the author of a number of scholarly and poetic works. He is also notable for rebuilding the Chora Church in Constantinople, where his mosaic donor portrait survives to this day. His younger son Andronikos I Komnenos eventually managed to realize Isaac's ambitions, becoming emperor in 1183–1185, the last of the Komnenian dynasty.

== Early life ==
Born on 16 January 1093, Isaac Komnenos was the fifth child and third son of Byzantine Emperor Alexios I Komnenos (r. 1081–1118) and Empress Irene Doukaina. As his father was reigning at the time, Isaac was a true porphyrogennetos ('prince born to the purple'), and the prestigious title is consistently associated with him throughout his life.

Following the death of his uncle, Nikephoros Melissenos, in 1104, Isaac was given the rank of Caesar by his father. During the succession struggle that followed the death of his father in 1118, Isaac supported his elder brother John II Komnenos (r. 1118–1143) against the intrigues of Empress-dowager Irene and their sister Anna Komnene, who favoured the candidacy of Anna's husband, Nikephoros Bryennios the Younger. In return, John II raised Isaac to the rank of sebastokrator (already borne by their middle brother, Andronikos). The conferral of this highest court rank, created by Alexios I to honour his elder brother Isaac, marked its bearer as almost equal to the emperor. Nevertheless, throughout his life, in almost all surviving texts or artifacts authored or funded by Isaac, he is known not by his rank, but rather by the title of Porphyrogenetos, which is often accompanied by an explicit reference to his father, Alexios I, rather than the reigning emperor, as was customary. This emphasis on his descent is very indicative of Isaac's perception of his status, and most likely represents a conscious choice: a legitimizing device for his imperial ambitions.

== Exile and wanderings ==
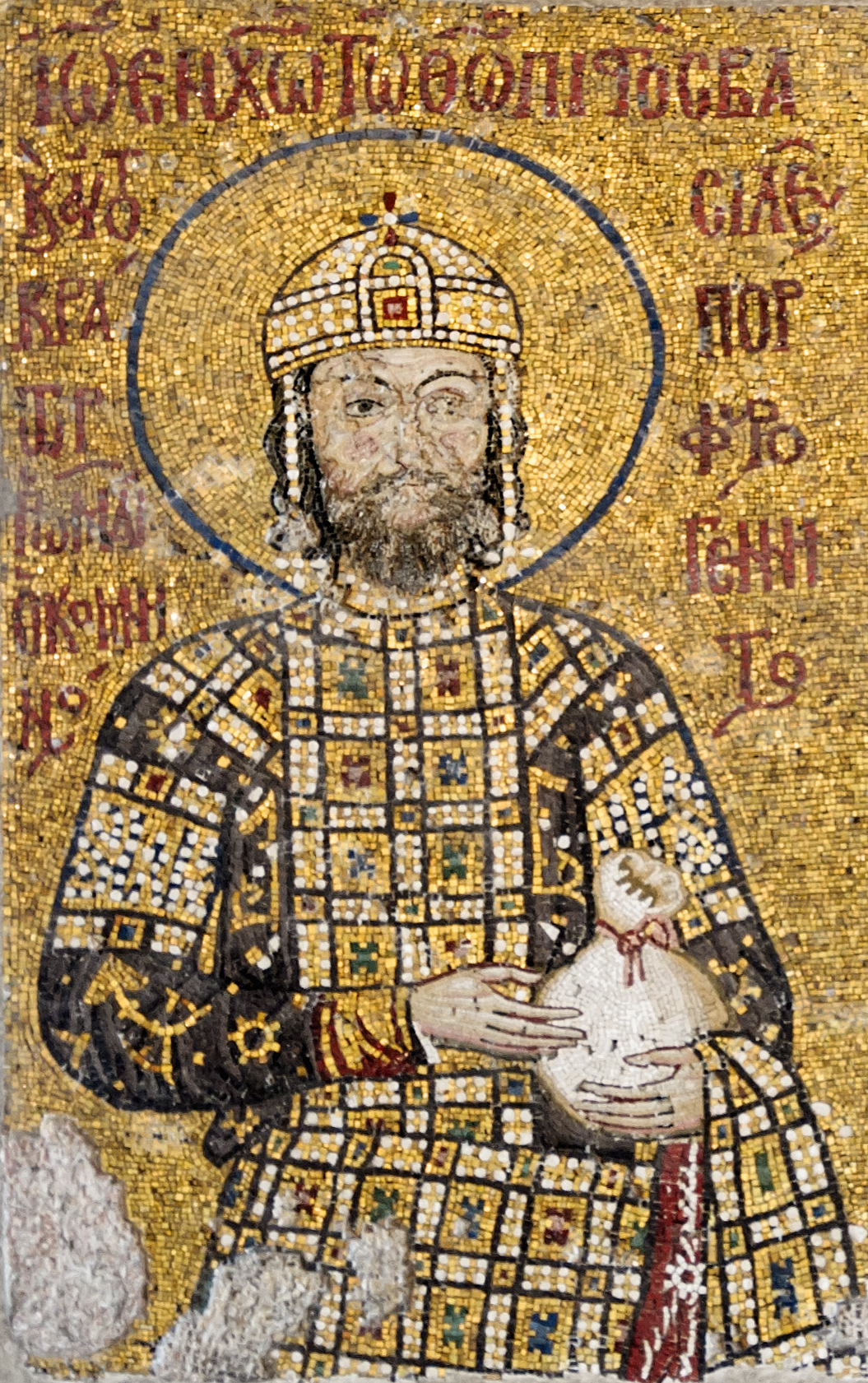
Mosaic of Isaac's brother and rival, Emperor John II, at the Hagia Sophia

Relations between Isaac and John II were cordial at first, but began to deteriorate, so that by 1130 they had become estranged. The reasons for this are left unexplained by the sources; Niketas Choniates and John Kinnamos simply report that Isaac had set his sight on the throne. Possibly the onset of the rift between the brothers was in 1122, when John raised his own firstborn son, Alexios, to co-emperor, thus superseding Isaac. In 1130, Isaac became involved in a conspiracy against John at a time when the latter was away from Constantinople, campaigning against the Seljuk Turks of the Sultanate of Rum. The conspiracy was uncovered, but Isaac and his two sons managed to flee Constantinople and find refuge at the court of the Danishmendid emir Ghazi (r. 1104–1134) at Melitene.

Isaac remained in exile for six years, during which time he traversed most of Asia Minor and the Levant, seeking to create a broad alliance with other rulers, both Christian and Muslim, against his brother. The main sources for this period of his life are Choniates, the court poet Theodore Prodromos, and the Syriac patriarch and chronicler Michael the Syrian. From Melitene, Isaac went to Trebizond, whose governor, Constantine Gabras, had broken away from Byzantium in 1126 and was ruling the area of Chaldia as an independent prince. In the winter of 1130–1131, according to Michael the Syrian, Isaac met again with Gabras, and a league was created between Isaac, Ghazi and the Sultan of Rum, Mesud I (r. 1116–1156). Isaac then went to Armenian Cilicia to entice its lord, Leo I, into the league. He was initially well received in Cilicia and spent some time there. His eldest son John even married one of Leo's daughters, and received the cities of Mopsuestia and Adana as his new wife's dowry. After a short while, however, they fell out with Leo too, and were forced to seek shelter with Sultan Mesud, abandoning their possessions in Cilicia.

According to Michael the Syrian, news of these machinations enraged John II, who in 1132 embarked on a campaign against both the Turks and the Armenians, capturing two fortresses on the shores of the Black Sea. However, his campaign was cut short when Isaac's sympathizers in Constantinople tried to use the emperor's absence to stage a coup. Informed of the conspiracy, John returned to the capital and thwarted their plans, but the Turks were able to counterattack and raid successfully into Byzantine territory, threatening the fortresses of Zinin and Sozopolis. Following 1132, Isaac is no longer mentioned by Michael the Syrian. During this time, he visited the Holy Land in pilgrimage, financing the construction of a new aqueduct for the Monastery of Saint John the Baptist near the Jordan River. The historian Konstantinos Varzos considers it likely, although no source mentions this, that the journey also had the purpose of seeking the aid of the King of Jerusalem, Fulk (r. 1131–1143).

== Return to Byzantium and accession of Manuel I ==
Despite his efforts, Isaac's attempted coalition against his brother failed to materialize, while John II's position continued to improve. The emperor's military successes, particularly following his Syrian campaign in 1137–1138 that led to the submission of the Principality of Antioch to the Byzantine Empire, enhanced his standing with the Byzantine aristocracy, officialdom, and the common people. As a result, Isaac's supporters in the empire began to desert his cause. Thus Isaac was forced to seek reconciliation with John II: along with his eldest son John, Isaac met his brother during the imperial army's return from Antioch in spring 1138. John II readily forgave his brother, and brought him to Constantinople. Indeed, according to Choniates, the emperor was more pleased about this reconciliation than his victories. Soon after, in 1139, Isaac's son John again defected to the Turks. Either at that point or a little later, Isaac was banished as a precaution to Heraclea Pontica.

Shortly before John II died in April 1143, he had designated his fourth and youngest son Manuel as his heir over his third (and oldest surviving) son, the sebastokrator Isaac. Consequently, Manuel's succession was not immediately secure. In this struggle for the throne, the elder Isaac threw his support behind his namesake nephew. However, the intervention of John Axouch, the commander-in-chief of the army, was decisive in securing the throne for Manuel. Isaac, who had been living in relative comfort in Heraclea, was imprisoned on Axouch's orders. Manuel nevertheless quickly felt his position strong enough to release his uncle as well as his older brother, and both attended Manuel's coronation on 28 November 1143. Even then, Isaac did not abandon his ambitions: according to the contemporary John Kinnamos, during one of Manuel's first campaigns against the Turks in 1146, when news spread in the camp that the emperor, rushing into the fray, was surrounded by enemies, Isaac immediately sped to the imperial tent, ready to be proclaimed emperor in case Manuel was killed.

== Final years and death ==
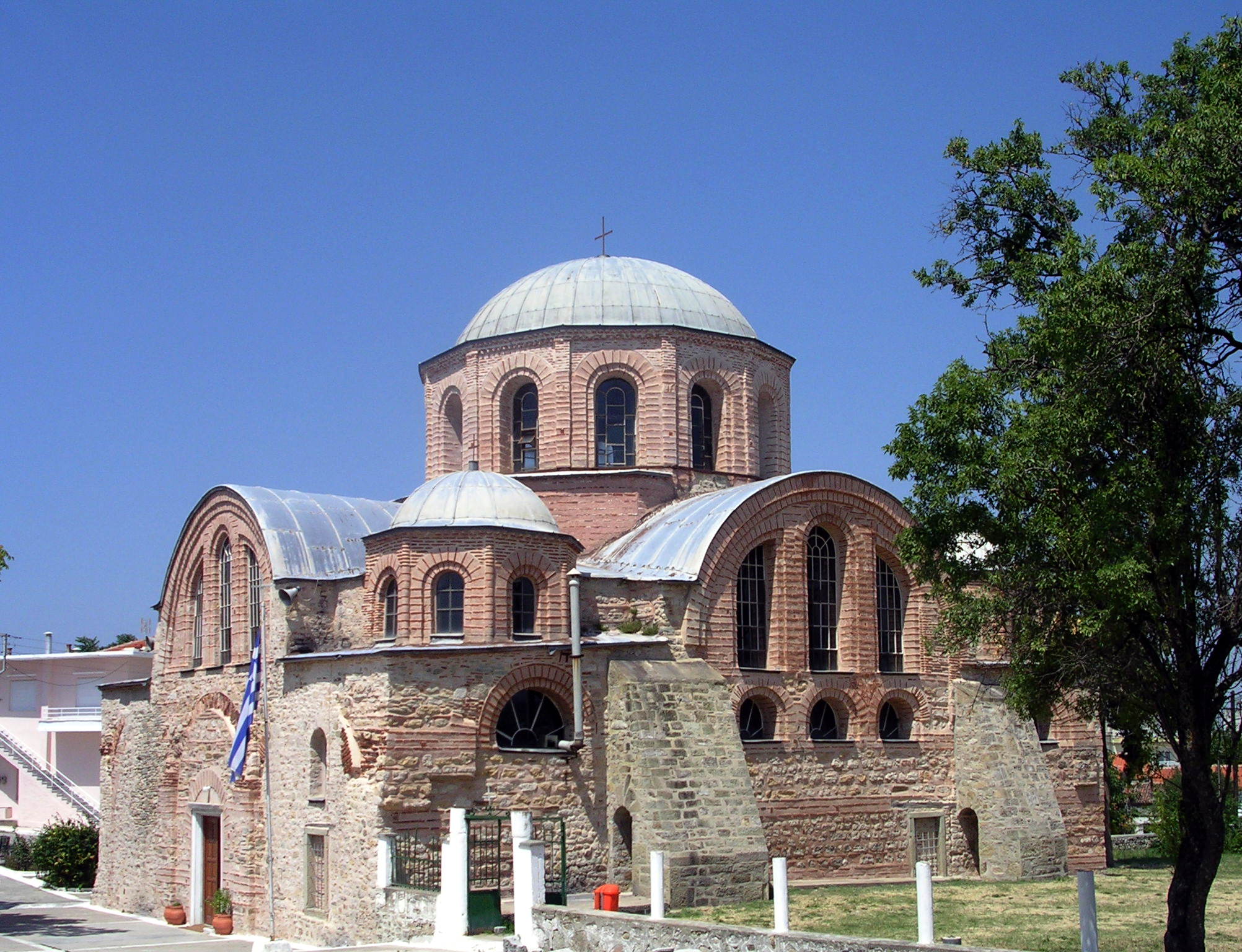
The katholikon of the Monastery of Theotokos Kosmosoteira today

After 1150, Manuel forced his uncle to retire from public affairs, a decision perhaps connected to a chronic illness that is first mentioned at the time. Isaac retired to his estates in Thrace, and in 1151/52, founded the cenobitic monastery of the Theotokos Kosmosoteira ('Theotokos the World-Saviour') at Bera (modern Feres). The construction of the monastery, which was meant as his residence and final resting place, was of great emotional importance to Isaac, who invested considerable time and effort in it: although heavily ill at the time, he still went and supervised the monastery's construction almost daily, and personally authored its typikon (charter) in 1152, making meticulous provisions about its governance and assigning extensive grants to it, including his own estates at Ainos. Possibly in imitation to his brother's foundation of the Pantokrator Monastery, he also ordered the erection of a hospital outside the monastery walls. The typikon was also a kind of last will, where Isaac regulated the affairs of his household—the head of his retinue Leo Kastamonites, his secretary Michael, his cupbearer (pinkernes) Constantine, his personal priest and household treasurer (protovestiarios) Constantine, and others—his family, and other dependents, such as a Jewish couple that he had personally converted to Christianity, baptizing them with the names of his parents. Isaac probably died shortly after the typikon was written.

== Works ==
In contrast to John, who was chiefly engaged in warfare throughout his reign, Isaac was a scholar and patron of learning and the arts. Apart from his foundation of the Kosmosoteira monastery, in Constantinople he restored the monastery of St. Stephen in the Aurelianae quarter, which he later attached to the Kosmosoteira as a hostel for monks visiting the capital.

In c. 1120 he rebuilt the Chora Church, originally restored by his maternal grandmother, Maria Doukaina. The Chora was also the initial location of his tomb, before he had it transferred to the Kosmosoteira. The Chora Church contains the only securely attested depiction of Isaac, in a deesis mosaic that dates to the church's restoration by Theodore Metochites in the early 14th century, but which most likely faithfully reproduces the original decoration of the church after Isaac's reconstruction. As historian Kallirroe Linardatou points out, in the mosaic, Isaac bears a crown that exceeds the simple circlet usually borne by a sebastokrator by being richly decorated and featuring a domed cover, attributes that deliberately hint at features of imperial crowns. He also commissioned a number of icons, either mentioned in the typikon of the Kosmosoteira or known through the epigraphs associated with them.

The court poet Theodore Prodromos wrote an encomium and a eulogy in hexameter for Isaac, where he praises his erudition and talent. Isaac is identified as the author of a paraphrase of the Letter of Aristeas in politic verse, preserved in the Seraglio Octateuch, and as the likely patron of this luxurious manuscript. In the typikon, Isaac himself claims to have composed poetry and compiled it in a book, and is sometimes identified with the writer called "Isaac Komnenos the porphyrogennetos" who composed two commentary works on Homer.

== Family and descendants ==
Isaac Komnenos was married c. 1110 to Irene, who may have been either the anonymous daughter of Volodar of Peremyshl (r. 1085–1124), known from the Slavonic Primary Chronicle to have married "the son of Emperor Alexios", or, according to a different hypothesis, Kata, a daughter of David IV of Georgia (r. 1089–1125). Their children were:

1. John Komnenos (born c. 1112), called Tzelepes (from the Turkish title Çelebi). He accompanied his father during his exile and married a daughter of Leo I, Prince of Armenia. In 1139, he defected to the Sultanate of Rum, became a Muslim, settled at the Seljuk capital of Ikonion and married Sultan Mesud's daughter.
2. A daughter (born c. 1114), possibly named Maria, who married the military commander Joseph Bryennios.
3. Anna Komnene (born c. 1116), who married the courtier and ambassador John Arbantenos.
4. Andronikos I Komnenos (c. 1118 – 1185), adventurer and eventually emperor in 1183–1185.

In addition, Isaac had a foster son, Constantine, whom he called by the diminutive Kostintzes.

Isaac's imperial ambitions—an "ancestral inheritance passed to his children", according to Kinnamos—were finally realized by his second son, Andronikos. Charismatic and capable, but also ruthless and violent, he overthrew Manuel I's widow and regent, Empress Maria of Antioch, in 1182. In the next year deposed and killed her son, Alexios II Komnenos (r. 1180–1183), and ascended the throne himself. During his rule, he attempted much-needed reforms, but also stirred up much opposition within the aristocracy, and under the impact of the Norman invasion of 1185, he was overthrown and killed, marking the end of the Komnenian dynasty on the Byzantine throne. From Andronikos' eldest son, Manuel, descended the dynasty of the Grand Komnenoi, who founded the Empire of Trebizond c. 1204 and ruled it until its demise in 1461.

== Sources ==
- Brand, Charles M., ed. (1976). Deeds of John and Manuel Comnenus, by John Kinnamos. New York: Columbia University Press. ISBN 0-231-04080-6.
- Kazhdan, Alexander, ed. (1991). The Oxford Dictionary of Byzantium. Oxford and New York: Oxford University Press. ISBN 0-19-504652-8.
- Linardou, Kallirroe (2016). "Imperial impersonations: Disguised portraits of a Komnenian prince and his father". In Bucossi, Alessandra; Rodriguez Suarez, Alex (eds.). John II Komnenos, Emperor of Byzantium: In the Shadow of Father and Son. London: Routledge. pp. 155–182. ISBN 978-1-4724-6024-0.
- Magdalino, Paul (2002) [1993]. The Empire of Manuel I Komnenos, 1143–1180 (Second ed.). Cambridge: Cambridge University Press. ISBN 9780521526531.
- Suny, Ronald Grigor (1994). The Making of the Georgian Nation (Second ed.). Bloomington and Indianapolis: Indiana University Press. ISBN 0-253-20915-3.
- Varzos, Konstantinos (1984). Η Γενεαλογία των Κομνηνών [The Genealogy of the Komnenoi] (PDF) (in Greek). Vol. A1. Thessaloniki: Centre for Byzantine Studies, University of Thessaloniki.

Preceded by Andronikos Komnenos	Sebastokrator of the Byzantine Empire; 1118 – after 1152; With: Andronikos Komnenos (until 1130/31), Andronikos Komnenos (1122–1142), Isaac Komnenos (from 1122), Manuel Komnenos (1122–1143)	Succeeded by Isaac Komnenos
