= George II of Constantinople =

Ecumenical Patriarch of Constantinople from 1191 to 1198

- Ecumenical Patriarch of Constantinople
- Church: Church of Constantinople
- In office: 10 September 1191 – 7 July 1198
- Predecessor: Dositheus of Constantinople
- Successor: John X of Constantinople

Personal details
- Born: George Xiphilinos
- Died: 7 July 1198
- Denomination: Eastern Orthodoxy

George II Xiphilinos (Greek: Γεώργιος Ξιφιλῖνος; died 7 July 1198) was the Ecumenical Patriarch of Constantinople between 1191 and 1198.

George was born to the Xiphilinos family, to which previous Patriarch John VIII of Constantinople belonged. According to Theodore Balsamon, George II, during the reign of Emperor Alexios I Komnenos, added one member to the Exokatakoiloi (an office similar to the Catholic cardinal in the Greek Church of the time), making it six.

== Notes and references ==
Eastern Orthodox Church titles
Preceded by Dositheus	Ecumenical Patriarch of Constantinople; 1191 – 1198	Succeeded by John X
