= Nicholas IV of Constantinople =

Ecumenical Patriarch of Constantinople from 1147 to 1151

- Ecumenical Patriarch of Constantinople
- Church: Church of Constantinople
- In office: December 1147 – March/April 1151
- Predecessor: Cosmas II of Constantinople
- Successor: Theodotus II of Constantinople

Personal details
- Born: c. 1070
- Died: 1152
- Denomination: Eastern Orthodoxy

Nicholas IV of Constantinople (Mouzalon Greek: Νικόλαος Μουζάλων; c. 1070 – 1152) was the Ecumenical Patriarch of Constantinople from December 1147 to March/April 1151.

Nicholas was born in c. 1070 and probably began his career teaching the gospels. Emperor Alexios I Komnenos (r. 1081–1118) appointed him as archbishop of Cyprus, but Nicholas abdicated the see in c. 1110. He spent the next 37 years in the Monastery of Saints Cosmas and Damian in the Kosmidion suburb of Constantinople.

He was elected to the patriarchal throne in 1147, replacing Patriarch Cosmas II of Constantinople, who was accused of Bogomilism. His election however caused considerable controversy: its canonical validity was called in question since he had voluntarily resigned from his previous see. Eventually, Nicholas IV was forced to resign as patriarch and died in 1152.

He wrote a number of theological works, amongst them a treatise refuting the Filioque addressed to Alexios I, and a vivid poetic defence of his first abdication.

== Bibliography ==
- Kazhdan, Alexander, ed. (1991), Oxford Dictionary of Byzantium, Oxford University Press, pp. 1467–1468, ISBN 978-0-19-504652-6

Eastern Orthodox Church titles
Preceded by Cosmas II	Ecumenical Patriarch of Constantinople; 1147–1151	Succeeded by Theodotus II
