= Leontius of Constantinople =

Ecumenical Patriarch of Constantinople in 1189

- Ecumenical Patriarch of Constantinople
- Church: Church of Constantinople
- In office: March – October 1189
- Predecessor: Dositheus of Constantinople
- Successor: Dositheus of Constantinople

Personal details
- Born: Leontius Theotokites
- Died: After 1190

Leontius of Constantinople (Leontius Theotokites Greek: Λεόντιος Θεοτοκίτης; died after 1190) was Ecumenical Patriarch of Constantinople from March 1189 until his deposition in October.

== Bibliography ==
- Grumel, Venance (1943). "La chronologie des patriarches de Constantinople de 1111 à 1206". Revue des études byzantines. 1: 250–270. doi:10.3406/rebyz.1943.909.
- Grumel, Venance (1958). Traité d'études byzantines - La chronologie. Vol. I. Paris: Presses universitaires de France.

Eastern Orthodox Church titles
Preceded by Dositheus	Ecumenical Patriarch of Constantinople; 1189	Succeeded by Dositheus (2)
