= Chariton of Constantinople =

Ecumenical Patriarch of Constantinople from 1178 to 1179

- Ecumenical Patriarch of Constantinople
- Church: Church of Constantinople
- In office: March/August 1178 – February/July 1179
- Predecessor: Michael III of Constantinople
- Successor: Theodosius I of Constantinople

Personal details
- Died: 1179
- Denomination: Eastern Orthodoxy

Chariton of Constantinople (Greek: Χαρίτων; died 1179) was Ecumenical Patriarch of Constantinople from 1178 to 1179, during the reign of Emperor Manuel I Komnenos.

== Bibliography ==
- Venance, Grumel (1943). "La chronologie des patriarches de Constantinople de 1111 à 1206". Revue des études byzantines (in French). 1: 250–270. doi:10.3406/rebyz.1943.909.
- Magdalino, Paul (2002) [1993]. The Empire of Manuel I Komnenos, 1143–1180 (Second ed.). Cambridge: Cambridge University Press. ISBN 9780521526531.

Eastern Orthodox Church titles
Preceded by Michael III	Ecumenical Patriarch of Constantinople; 1178 – 1179	Succeeded by Theodosius I
