= Basil II of Constantinople =

Ecumenical Patriarch of Constantinople from 1183 to 1186

- Ecumenical Patriarch of Constantinople
- Church: Church of Constantinople
- In office: August 1183 – February 1186
- Predecessor: Theodosius I of Constantinople
- Successor: Nicetas II of Constantinople

Personal details
- Born: Basil Kamateros
- Died: After 1186
- Denomination: Eastern Orthodoxy

Basil II of Constantinople (Basil Kamateros Greek: Βασίλειος Καματηρός; died after 1186) was the Ecumenical Patriarch of Constantinople from August 1183 to February 1186.

Basil was a member of the Kamateros family, which provided a number of leading officials in the 12th century. He initially served under Emperor Manuel I Komnenos (r. 1143–1180) as a diplomat, but after a disastrous mission in Italy, he fell out of favour and was banished. His fortunes revived under Emperor Andronikos I Komnenos (r. 1183–1185), who had also been exiled by Manuel I.

At the time, Andronikos I was having trouble with Patriarch Theodosius I of Constantinople, who opposed the emperor on a number of issues. These were the projected marriage of his illegitimate daughter Eirene to Alexios II Komnenos, the illegitimate son of Manuel I, although they were close relatives, as well as the expulsion of the Empress dowager Maria of Antioch from the Great Palace. Theodosius I was forced to abdicate and replaced by Basil II.

Basil II immediately complied with Andronikos I's wishes, clearing the path for the marriage and even absolving the murderers of the young emperor Alexios II Komnenos (r. 1180–1183). After Andronikos I was overthrown and executed in September 1185 however, Basil II failed to ingratiate himself with the new emperor Isaac II Angelos (r. 1185–1195 and 1203–1204), despite officiating at his coronation. He was deposed and condemned by a synod for his approval of Eirene's and Alexios II's marriage. Nothing further is known of him after that.

== Bibliography ==
- Kazhdan, Alexander, ed. (1991). The Oxford Dictionary of Byzantium. Oxford and New York: Oxford University Press. ISBN 0-19-504652-8.

Eastern Orthodox Church titles
Preceded by Theodosius I	Ecumenical Patriarch of Constantinople; 1183 – 1186	Succeeded by Nicetas II
