= John X of Constantinople =

Ecumenical Patriarch of Constantinople from 1198 to 1204

- Ecumenical Patriarch of Constantinople
- Church: Church of Constantinople
- In office: 5 August 1198 – 12 April 1204
- Predecessor: George II of Constantinople
- Successor: Michael IV of Constantinople

Personal details
- Born: John Kamateros
- Died: May 1206
- Denomination: Eastern Orthodoxy

John X Kamateros Greek: Ἰωάννης Καματηρός; died May 1206) was the Ecumenical Patriarch of Constantinople from 5 August 1198 to May 1206.

== Life ==
John was a member of the Kamateros family to which belonged the Empress Euphrosyne Doukaina Kamatera, wife of Alexios III Angelos (r. 1195–1203). An educated man, well versed in classical literature, rhetoric and philosophy, he occupied a series of ecclesiastical posts reaching the post of chartophylax, which he held at the time of his elevation to the patriarchal throne.

In 1198–1200, he had an exchange of letters with Pope Innocent III on the issue of papal supremacy and the Filioque clause. He disputed Rome's claim to primacy based on Saint Peter and asserted that in reality its primacy came from the fact that Rome was the old imperial capital. He intervened in the riots in Constantinople against the arrest of the banker Kalomodios and secured his release, but during the coup of John Komnenos the Fat on 31 July 1200, he hid in a cupboard as the rebels seized control of the Hagia Sophia.

John X remained in office after Alexios III's deposition in July 1203, and according to Western sources, both he and Alexios IV Angelos, threatened by the Fourth Crusade, acknowledged papal supremacy in the same year. After the capture of Constantinople during the Fourth Crusade in 1204, he initially fled to Didymoteichon in Thrace. In 1206, Emperor of Nicaea Theodore I Laskaris invited him to Nicaea, where he had established the Empire of Nicaea, a Byzantine Greek successor state, but John X refused, perhaps because of his advanced age, and died in May of the same year.

The Crusaders then installed a Latin Patriarchate of Constantinople, while Theodore I Laskaris simply created a new provisional seat of the Ecumenical Patriarchate of Constantinople in Nicaea, which was eventually restored in Constantinople with the rest of the Empire in 1261.

== Bibliography ==
- Kazhdan, Alexander, ed. (1991), Oxford Dictionary of Byzantium, Oxford University Press, ISBN 978-0-19-504652-6.

Eastern Orthodox Church titles
Preceded by George II	Ecumenical Patriarch of Constantinople; 1198 – 1204	Succeeded by Michael IV
