= John Doukas Komnenos =

12th-century Byzantine nobleman

- Born: 1126; Constantinople
- Died: c. 17 September 1176
- Noble family: Komnenos
- Spouse: Taronitissa
- Issue: Maria Komnene; Alexios Komnenos
- Father: Andronikos Komnenos
- Mother: Irene

John Doukas Komnenos (1126 – September 1176) was a son of Andronikos Komnenos. Through his father, he was a grandson of Byzantine emperor John II Komnenos. He was doux (military governor) of Cyprus from 1155 until his death.

== Life ==
Born in 1126 as the oldest child of the sebastokrator Andronikos Komnenos and his wife Irene, John was orphaned in 1142 when his father died. John came under the protection of his uncle, Emperor Manuel I Komnenos (r. 1143–1180), to whom he remained close throughout his life: in his opulent palatial residence in Constantinople, John commissioned mosaics depicting the martial deeds of the emperors of the Komnenian dynasty, with an inscription that lauded Manuel as his "spiritual father" and even a "second God". In his youth he was lauded for his beauty, his pale complexion and blond hair.

John is first mentioned on campaign in 1146, against the Sultanate of Rum. In 1148 John took part in a Western-style tournament in Heraclea, where he was wounded and lost an eye to the lance strike of an Italian knight. As a recompense, Emperor Manuel I gave him the high rank of protosebastos and appointed him to the office of protovestiarios. This provoked the envy and enmity of the future Andronikos I Komnenos. This rivalry deepened in the following years, as Andronikos became the lover of John's younger sister, Eudokia, and as a result of a public quarrel in 1154; in the same year, John accused his cousin of intending to assassinate Emperor Manuel, while Andronikos openly proclaimed that he wanted to "cut the head of my biggest enemy", meaning John. This statement led Emperor Manuel to imprison Andronikos.

John fought in the Byzantine–Hungarian wars in 1150, winning a victory against a Hungarian detachment near the Strymon river. It may be during this campaign that he received a wound to the thigh, and lost the little finger of his left hand. In 1151, John was doux (military governor) of Sardica (modern Sofia, Bulgaria), was doux of Naissus (modern Nish, Serbia) c. 1154/1155, and then governor of Cyprus in 1155.

In the spring of 1156, Cyprus was attacked by Raynald of Châtillon and Thoros II of Armenia. While John, with a part of the Byzantine garrison remained at the capital, Nicosia, the general Michael Branas led a force to confront the invaders. Branas was driven back towards Nicosia, and John led a sally to rescue him. The Byzantines were again defeated, with both John and Branas taken prisoner. The victorious Franks and Armenians then conducted widespread plundering of the island, not sparing churches or convents. In the words of the historian Steven Runciman, "The crops were burnt; the herds were rounded up, together with all the population, and driven down to the coast. The women were raped; children and folk too old to move had their throats cut". The rape of the island lasted for three weeks, before Raynald and Thoros re-embarked their men upon the news of the approach of a Byzantine fleet.

John and Branas were taken in captivity to Antioch until he was ransomed. This was done at some unknown point, as John took part in a church council in the Palace of Blachernae in May 1157. In 1158 John accompanied Manuel on his campaign in Cilicia; his presence is attested at the reception of King Baldwin III of Jerusalem at Mopsuestia. John is then attested as attending church synods at Constantinople in March 1166, as well as January–February 1170.

When John's son-in-law, Amalric of Jerusalem, visited Constantinople in March 1171, John was detailed to welcome him on Byzantine territory and accompany him to the Byzantine capital. John then took part in the campaign against the Seljuks that led to the Battle of Myriokephalon. The Byzantines were defeated and John was killed during the battle, shortly after 17 September 1176.

== Family ==
John Doukas was married around 1146 to a woman from the Taronites family, whose first name is unknown. She likely was a descendant of Maria Komnene, sister of Alexios I Komnenos, and Michael Taronites. The couple had several daughters and at least one son, but not all of them are known by name:

1. Maria (c. 1154 – 1208/1217), who became queen of Jerusalem
2. Alexios Komnenos, led a rebellion against Andronikos I Komnenos, but was captured, blinded and imprisoned, died unmarried in 1187.
3. (probably) Theodora (fl. 1140) who became princess of Antioch

== Sources ==
- Runciman, Steven (1952). A History of the Crusades, Volume II: The Kingdom of Jerusalem and the Frankish East. Vol. 2. Cambridge: Cambridge University Press.
- Varzos, Konstantinos (1984). Η Γενεαλογία των Κομνηνών [The Genealogy of the Komnenoi] (PDF) (in Greek). Vol. B. Thessaloniki: Centre for Byzantine Studies, University of Thessaloniki.
