= John IX of Constantinople =

Ecumenical Patriarch of Constantinople from 1111 to 1134

- Ecumenical Patriarch of Constantinople
- Church: Church of Constantinople
- In office: 24 May 1111 – late April 1134
- Predecessor: Nicholas III of Constantinople
- Successor: Leo of Constantinople

Personal details
- Died: Late April 1134
- Denomination: Eastern Orthodoxy

John IX of Constantinople (Agapetos or Hieromnemon (Greek: Ἰωάννης Ἀγαπητός or Ἱερομνήμων; died April 1134) was Ecumenical Patriarch of Constantinople between 24 May 1111 and late April 1134. John IX's nickname is because before his election to the Patriarchal throne, he held the office of hieromnemon within the Ecumenical Patriarchate of Constantinople. He was the nephew of a prominent Metropolis of Chalcedon.

He was a cleric from within the scholarly, philosophical branch of the Church hierarchy, and had risen through the ranks of the patriarchal clergy. He sought to reverse the secularising trend within the clergy by banning them from acting as advocates in civil courts. A lifelong scholar, he sought to reclaim the great, but dispersed, collection of books within the capital, as there was no central library. He made it a practice to acquire the book collections of deceased powerful men and then had the patriarchal staff recopy them. His measures greatly expanded the range of titles held in the Great Church to which teachers were attached.

Within religious matters, he pushed the trend of making the patriarchal clergy, rather than the monastic community, the authoritative voice of Orthodoxy. He also convened a council in Constantinople in 1117 which condemned the doctrine of Eustratius of Nicaea as Nestorian, despite the defence offered by the Patriarch. During his patriarchate some efforts were made by Emperor Alexios I Komnenos to bridge the schism between the Orthodox and the Catholic Church but these failed, as Pope Paschal II in late 1112 pressed the demand that the Patriarch of Constantinople recognise the Papal primacy over "all the churches of God throughout the world". This was something the patriarch could not do in face of opposition from the majority of secular clergy, the monastic world, and the laity.

== Sources ==
- Ecumenical Patriarchate
- Joan M. Hussey, The Orthodox Church in the Byzantine Empire, Oxford University Press, 1986.
- Magdalino, Paul (2002) [1993]. The Empire of Manuel I Komnenos, 1143–1180 (Second ed.). Cambridge: Cambridge University Press. ISBN 9780521526531.

Eastern Orthodox Church titles
Preceded by Nicholas III	Ecumenical Patriarch of Constantinople; 1111 – 1134	Succeeded by Leo
