= Andronikos Komnenos (son of John II) =

12th-century Byzantine prince

- Sebastokrator
- Born: c. 1108; Constantinople (modern-day Istanbul, Turkey)
- Died: 1142
- Spouse: Eirene
- Issue: Maria Komnene; John Doukas Komnenos; Theodora Komnene; Eudokia Komnene; Alexios Komnenos
- Dynasty: Komnenos
- Father: John II Komnenos
- Mother: Piroska of Hungary

Andronikos Komnenos (Greek: Ἀνδρόνικος Κομνηνός) (c. 1108 – 1142), Latinized as Andronicus Comnenus, was a Byzantine prince of the Komnenian dynasty.

== Biography ==
Andronikos Komnenos was born in c. 1108/9, as the third child and second son of the Byzantine Emperor John II Komnenos and his Hungarian wife, Piroska (Irene). Probably in 1122, when his elder brother Alexios was raised to co-emperor, he received the rank of sebastokratōr along with his younger brothers Isaac and Manuel.

Komnenos became early on involved in military affairs. His first campaign was when he accompanied his father in his decisive victory against the Hungarians in 1129. Like his other brothers, he then accompanied John II during his successive campaigns against the Seljuk Turks in Asia Minor. The court poets Michael Italikos and Theodore Prodromos praised Andronikos's military ability, the former comparing him to the mythical heroes of the Iliad. He died in August 1142, shortly after his elder brother Alexios. The brothers had once again followed their father, who campaigned against the Armenian Kingdom of Cilicia, but at Attaleia Alexios suddenly fell ill and died. Andronikos, who thus became the heir-apparent, outlived him a short while, before succumbing as well. While John II continued his campaign, the third brother Isaac finally brought the corpses of his two brothers back to Constantinople, where they were entombed in the Pantokrator Monastery.

== Family ==
Komnenos was married around 1124 a woman named Irene, whose family and origin are unknown, except for a reference by an unknown poet who claimed in an encomiastic poem of her that she descended from the Aeneads. The couple had several children:

- John Doukas Komnenos (1126 – 17 September 1176), who married (first name unknown) Taronitissa, and had several daughters, including Maria, the future Queen of Jerusalem, and a son, Manuel.
- Maria Komnene (born 1127), who married Theodoros Dasiotes, then John Kantakouzenos, with offspring from the latter.
- Eudokia Komnene (born c. 1129), who married an unknown first husband and then Michael Gabras, with offspring from the latter. She was also one of the mistresses of Andronikos I Komnenos.
- Theodora Komnene (c. 1132 – 3 January 1184), who married Henry II Jasomirgott, with offspring.
- Alexios Komnenos, who was married to Maria Doukaina, and had a daughter, Eudokia, and two short-lived sons. He is believed to have had Empress-dowager Maria of Antioch (widow of Manuel I) as a mistress. He headed the regency council for her son, Alexios II.

== Sources ==
- Varzos, Konstantinos (1984). Η Γενεαλογία των Κομνηνών [The Genealogy of the Komnenoi] (PDF) (in Greek). Vol. A1. Thessaloniki: Centre for Byzantine Studies, University of Thessaloniki.
- Varzos, Konstantinos (1984). Η Γενεαλογία των Κομνηνών [The Genealogy of the Komnenoi] (PDF) (in Greek). Vol. B. Thessaloniki: Centre for Byzantine Studies, University of Thessaloniki.

Preceded by Andronikos Komnenos, Isaac Komnenos	Sebastokrator of the Byzantine Empire; 1122–1142; With: Andronikos Komnenos (until 1130/31), Isaac Komnenos, Isaac Komnenos, Manuel Komnenos	Succeeded by Isaac Komnenos, Isaac Komnenos, Manuel Komnenos
