= Cosmas II of Constantinople =

Ecumenical Patriarch of Constantinople from 1146 to 1147

- Ecumenical Patriarch of Constantinople
- Church: Church of Constantinople
- In office: April 1146 – 26 February 1147
- Predecessor: Michael II of Constantinople
- Successor: Nicholas IV of Constantinople

Personal details
- Born: Aegina, Greece
- Died: After 1147
- Denomination: Eastern Orthodoxy

Cosmas II of Constantinople (Atticus Greek: Κοσμᾶς ὁ Ἀττικός; died after 1147) was Ecumenical Patriarch of Constantinople from April 1146 until 26 February 1147. He was born in Aegina, in Greece, and was a deacon of Hagia Sophia before his ascension, after Michael II of Constantinople abdicated. He was highly respected for his learning and for his holy character. Cosmas II reigned during the rule of Byzantine emperor Manuel I Komnenos.

== Deposition ==
Cosmas II was condemned and deposed on 26 February 1147 by a synod held at the Palace of Blachernae because of indulgence in relation to the monk Niphon, a condemned Bogomil since 1144, whom he received in his home and at his table.

The exact reasons for the conviction and deposition of Cosmas II are not clearly established; perhaps he was the victim of political intrigue. It is clear however that Emperor Manuel I intervened directly in forming the Synod that deposed Cosmas II, interviewing personally those who accused him, and testing Cosmas II directly on his opinions of the heretical Niphon. This affair is typical both of the doctrinal controversies common in the reign of Manuel I and also of the Emperor's readiness to become actively involved in them. In a story reported by Niketas Choniates, Cosmas cursed the womb of the empress Bertha of Sulzbach during the deposition. Stephanos Kontostephanos had to be restrained from striking the patriarch. This act of violence was more symbolic than actual, and was a way for the Kontostephanoi to demonstrate their loyalty to Manuel.

== Notes and references ==
Eastern Orthodox Church titles
Preceded by Michael II	Ecumenical Patriarch of Constantinople; 1146 – 1147	Succeeded by Nicholas IV
