= Dositheus of Constantinople =

Ecumenical Patriarch of Constantinople from 1189 to 1191

- Ecumenical Patriarch of Constantinople
- Church: Church of Constantinople
- In office: February 1189 (9 days); October 1189 – 10 September 1191
- Predecessor: Nicetas II of Constantinople; Leontius of Constantinople
- Successor: Leontius of Constantinople; George II of Constantinople

Personal details
- Died: After 1191
- Denomination: Eastern Orthodoxy

Dositheus of Constantinople (Greek: Δοσίθεος; died after 1191) was twice Ecumenical Patriarch of Constantinople (for 9 days in February 1189, and again from October 1189 until he was restored as Patriarch of Jerusalem on 10 September 1191 and abdicated as Patriarch of Constantinople on 10 September 1191). He was previously Greek Orthodox Patriarch of Jerusalem (1187–1189). He was a close friend of the Byzantine Emperor Isaac II Angelos.

== Bibliography ==
- Bréhier, Louis (1970) [1949]. Éditions Albin Michel (ed.). Le monde byzantin - les institutions de l'Empire byzantin. Vol. II.
- Grumel, Venance (1943). "La chronologie des patriarches de Constantinople de 1111 à 1206". Revue des études byzantines. 1: 250–270. doi:10.3406/rebyz.1943.909.
- Grumel, Venance (1958). Traité d'études byzantines - La chronologie. Vol. I. Paris: Presses Universitaires de France.
- Viton de Saint-Allais, Nicolas (1818). L'art de vérifier les dates. Vol. I. Paris.

Eastern Orthodox Church titles
| Preceded by Nicetas II | Ecumenical Patriarch of Constantinople; 1189 | Succeeded by Leontius |
| Preceded by Leontius | Ecumenical Patriarch of Constantinople; 1189 – 1191 | Succeeded by George II |
