= Dikaiodotes =

The dikaiodotes (Greek: δικαιοδότης, "giver of the laws") was a Byzantine judicial office attested in the 11th–12th centuries.

The title existed already since antiquity in the non-technical sense of "dispenser of the laws". The title acquired a technical sense probably under Alexios I Komnenos: in 1094, the dikaiodotes is attested as a distinct office, presiding over one of the Byzantine Empire's main tribunals in Constantinople. Its exact duties are unknown, but the office was among the most important in the civil administration during its existence. Its holders often held it in tandem with other titles, including the prestigious position of kanikleios (keeper of the imperial inkstand). Its last holder, the sebastos Michael Belissariotes, is attested in 1197.

== Sources ==
- Kazhdan, Alexander, ed. (1991). The Oxford Dictionary of Byzantium. New York and Oxford: Oxford University Press. ISBN 978-0-19-504652-6.
