= Constantine IV of Constantinople =

Ecumenical Patriarch of Constantinople from 1154 to 1157

- Ecumenical Patriarch of Constantinople
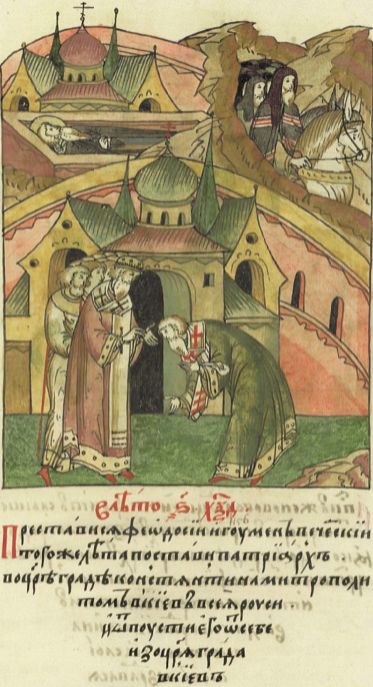
- Church: Church of Constantinople
- In office: November 1154 – May 1157
- Predecessor: Neophytus I of Constantinople
- Successor: Luke of Constantinople

Personal details
- Died: May 1157
- Denomination: Eastern Orthodoxy

Constantine IV of Constantinople (Chliarenus Greek: Κωνσταντῖνος Χλιαρηνός; died May 1157) was Ecumenical Patriarch of Constantinople from November 1154 to May 1157.

== Bibliography ==
- Grumel, Venance (1943), "La chronologie des patriarches de Constantinople de 1111 à 1206", Revue des études byzantines, 1: 250–270, doi:10.3406/rebyz.1943.909.

Eastern Orthodox Church titles
Preceded by Neophytus I	Ecumenical Patriarch of Constantinople; 1154 – 1157	Succeeded by Luke
