= Michael II of Constantinople =

Ecumenical Patriarch of Constantinople from 1143 to 1146

Saint Michael II of Constantinople
- Ecumenical Patriarch of Constantinople
- Church: Church of Constantinople
- In office: July 1143 – March 1146
- Predecessor: Leo of Constantinople
- Successor: Cosmas II of Constantinople

Personal details
- Born: Michael Kourkouas
- Died: After 1146
- Denomination: Eastern Orthodoxy

Michael II of Constantinople (Kourkouas or Oxeites Greek: Μιχαὴλ Κουρκούας (Ὀξείτης); died after 1146) was an Eastern Orthodox Ecumenical Patriarch of Constantinople of July 1143 to March 1146.

In early 1143, Patriarch Leo of Constantinople and Emperor John II Komnenos died within a few months of each other, bringing a period of turbulence to the Byzantine Church. John's appointed successor, his son Emperor Manuel I Komnenos arrived in Constantinople on 27 June 1143, from Cilicia where his father had died. In order to fully assure his position as emperor, Manuel I needed to arrange his coronation. However, to do this he first needed to appoint a patriarch. His choice fell on the abbot of the monastery of Oxeia, Michael Kourkouas. The coronation did not take place until 28 November 1143, because Michael II threatened to resign for unknown reasons.

During his reign, Michael II had to deal with the highly political trial of a monk called Niphon. On 22 February 1144, Michael II condemned Niphon for supporting two Cappadocian bishops who were accused of heresy and later found guilty of Bogomil practices. This forbade orthodox believers from associating with him.

Michael II resigned in March 1146 to return to the monastery of Oxeia, most likely because of disillusion with the emperor.

== Notes and references ==
Eastern Orthodox Church titles
Preceded by Leo	Ecumenical Patriarch of Constantinople; 1143 – 1146	Succeeded by Cosmas II
