= Theodotus II of Constantinople =

Ecumenical Patriarch of Constantinople from 1151 to 1153

- Ecumenical Patriarch of Constantinople
- Church: Church of Constantinople
- In office: 1151 – 1153
- Predecessor: Nicholas IV of Constantinople
- Successor: Neophytus I of Constantinople

Personal details
- Died: October 1154
- Denomination: Eastern Orthodoxy

Theodotus II of Constantinople, also known as Theodosius I (Greek: Θεόδοτος or Θεοδόσιος; died October 1154), was a 12th-century Christian cleric who served as Ecumenical Patriarch of Constantinople from 1151 until 1153.

Theodotus was an abbot at the Monastery of the Resurrection in Constantinople. His two-year reign as Patriarch of Constantinople was uneventful, and he died in office. He was Patriarch during the rule of Byzantine emperor Manuel I Comnenus.

A letter from the Metropolis of Ephesus, George Tornikes, to the Archbishopric of Athens, George Bourtzes, notes how Tornikes was nearly lynched by the "rude mass of the clergy of Hagia Sophia" when he objected to their plan to economise on Theodotus II's funeral expenses. The desire to deny him the full measure of state funeral may have been due to accusations that the Patriarch was a Bogomil, an accusation leveled by the Patriarch-elect of Antioch, Soterichos Panteugenos, who used the dead Theodotus II's "black and withered hand" as evidence of his heresy. John Kinnamos notes only that Theodotus II was "practiced in ascetic discipline".

== Notes and references ==
Eastern Orthodox Church titles
| Preceded by Nicholas IV | Patriarch of Constantinople; 1151 – 1153 | Succeeded by Neophytus I |
