= Theodosius I of Constantinople =

Ecumenical Patriarch of Constantinople from 1179 to 1183

- Ecumenical Patriarch of Constantinople
- Church: Church of Constantinople
- In office: February / July 1179 – August 1183
- Predecessor: Chariton of Constantinople
- Successor: Basil II of Constantinople

Personal details
- Born: Theodosius Borradiotes Antioch
- Died: After 1183 Constantinople
- Denomination: Eastern Orthodoxy

Theodosius I of Constantinople (Borradiotes Greek: Θεοδόσιος Βορραδιώτης; died after 1183) was the Ecumenical Patriarch of Constantinople from 1179 to 1183. He lived as an ascetic.

In the year 1181, when Maria Komnene was being persecuted for her plot against the regent Maria of Antioch and the protosebastos Alexios Komnenos, Theodosios granted her asylum in the Hagia Sophia. As a result, on 2 May 1181, battles ensued in the streets around the church, between the imperial troops and the mercenaries of Maria Komnena. After these ended with a peace agreement, Theodosius was removed from his position as patriarch for his cooperation with the conspirator and banished to the Pantepoptes Monastery. However, after a very short time he returned and resumed his office before it could be assigned to someone else, since his great popularity among the clergy and the population of Constantinople prevented his complete removal.

In 1183 the new emperor Andronikos I asked him for approval for the marriage of his daughter Irene to her cousin Alexios, son of the previous emperor Manuel I Komnenos. Theodosios refused this, because marriages between close relatives were illegal, but he was opposed by judges that had been corrupted by Andronikos, who argued that the two didn't count as relatives, because they were both illegitimate children. When Theodosios realized he could not win the case, he decided to leave his position as Patriarch of Constantinople, and retire to the island of Terebinthos.

== Notes and references ==
Eastern Orthodox Church titles
Preceded by Chariton	Patriarch of Constantinople; 1179 – 1183	Succeeded by Basil II
