= Michael III of Constantinople =

Ecumenical Patriarch of Constantinople from 1170 to 1178

- Ecumenical Patriarch of Constantinople
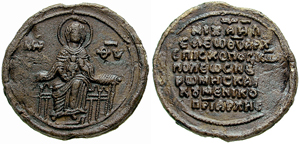
- Seal of Michael III
- Church: Church of Constantinople
- In office: January 1170 – March 1178
- Predecessor: Luke of Constantinople
- Successor: Chariton of Constantinople

Personal details
- Died: March 1178
- Denomination: Eastern Orthodoxy

Michael III of Constantinople (Greek: Μιχαήλ; died March 1178) was Ecumenical Patriarch of Constantinople from January 1170 to March 1178.

== Biography ==
Michael was appointed patriarch by the Byzantine emperor Manuel I Komnenos, culminating what had been a highly distinguished intellectual and administrative career. Before becoming Patriarch, Michael III had held a progression of important church administrative offices, including referendarios, epi tou sakelliou, and protekdikos, the last of which was in charge of the tribunal which adjudicated claims for asylum within the Great Church. The most important of his appointments before receiving the Patriarchal throne was the office of hypatos ton philosophon (ὕπατος τῶν φιλοσόφων, "chief of the philosophers"), a title given to the head of the imperial University of Constantinople in the 11th–14th centuries. In this role he condemned the neoplatonist philosophers and encouraged study of Aristotle's work on the natural sciences as an antidote. As Patriarch, Michael III continued to deal with the theological issue of the relation between the Son and the Father in the Holy Trinity. The issue was created due to the explanation that one Demetrius of Lampi (in Phrygia) gave to the phrase of the Gospel of John «ὁ Πατήρ μου μείζων μου ἐστίν», which means my Father is bigger than me (John, XIV.29). Michael III acted as the Emperor's chief spokesman on this issue. Michael III also ordered a review of Eastern Orthodox ecclesiastical and imperial laws and decrees by Theodore Balsamon, Patriarch of Antioch, known as the "Scholia" (Greek: Σχόλια) (c. 1170).

Michael III's patriarchy was marked by Emperor Manuel I's attempts to forge a union with the Catholic Church. Continuing a longstanding papal policy, Pope Alexander III demanded recognition of their religious authority over all Christians everywhere, and wished themselves to reach superiority over the Byzantine Emperor; they were not at all willing to fall into a state of dependence from one emperor to the other. Manuel I, on the other side, wanted an official recognition of his secular authority over both East and West. Such conditions would not be accepted by either side. A council did meet in Constantinople in the year 1170, for the purpose of union, but it failed to achieve this purpose. The ruling of the council was described by Macarius of Ancyra, Metropolis of Ancyra: "And when, after having said and heard many things, as chance would have it, they [the Latins] were for making no concessions, but insisted that everybody should give way to them unreservedly, and adopt their customs, all hope being gone, the emperor, the council, and the whole senate, gave their vote in favour of a total separation from the pope and those who thought with him, and referred it all to the judgment of God. However, it was not thought proper to consign them, a great and distinguished nation as they were, to a formal anathema, like other heresies, even while repudiating union and communion with them".

Even if a pro-western Emperor such as Manuel I agreed to it, the Greek citizens of the Empire would have rejected outright any union of this sort, as they did almost three hundred years later when the Orthodox and Catholic churches were briefly united under the Pope. In existing correspondence, Michael III presents a deeply courteous but unbending position on the authority of his Church. The correspondence also show a good working relationship with the Emperor.

Some of Michael III's correspondence with Manuel I survive, as does his inaugural address as hypatos. Other documents including correspondence with Pope Alexander III have been attributed to him, though they are more likely later apocryphal creations of the 13th century. Michael III can also take credit for acting as patron to the young Michael Choniates, who composed an encomium in his honour, still extant.

== Bibliography ==
- Οικουμενικό Πατριαρχείο.
- J. M. Hussey, The Orthodox Church in the Byzantine Empire, Oxford University Press, 1986.
- Kazhdan, Alexander, ed. (1991). The Oxford Dictionary of Byzantium. Oxford and New York: Oxford University Press. ISBN 0-19-504652-8.
- Kurtz, Johann Heinrich (1860). "Dogmatic Controversies, 12th and 14th Centuries". History of the Christian Church to the Reformation. T&T Clark.
- Magdalino, Paul (2002) [1993]. The Empire of Manuel I Komnenos, 1143–1180 (Second ed.). Cambridge: Cambridge University Press. ISBN 9780521526531.

Eastern Orthodox Church titles
Preceded by Luke	Ecumenical Patriarch of Constantinople; 1170 – 1178	Succeeded by Chariton
