= Byzantine–Seljuk war (1175–1179) =

Conflict between Byzantium and Rum

Byzantine–Seljuk War (1175–1179)
- Part of the Byzantine–Seljuk Wars
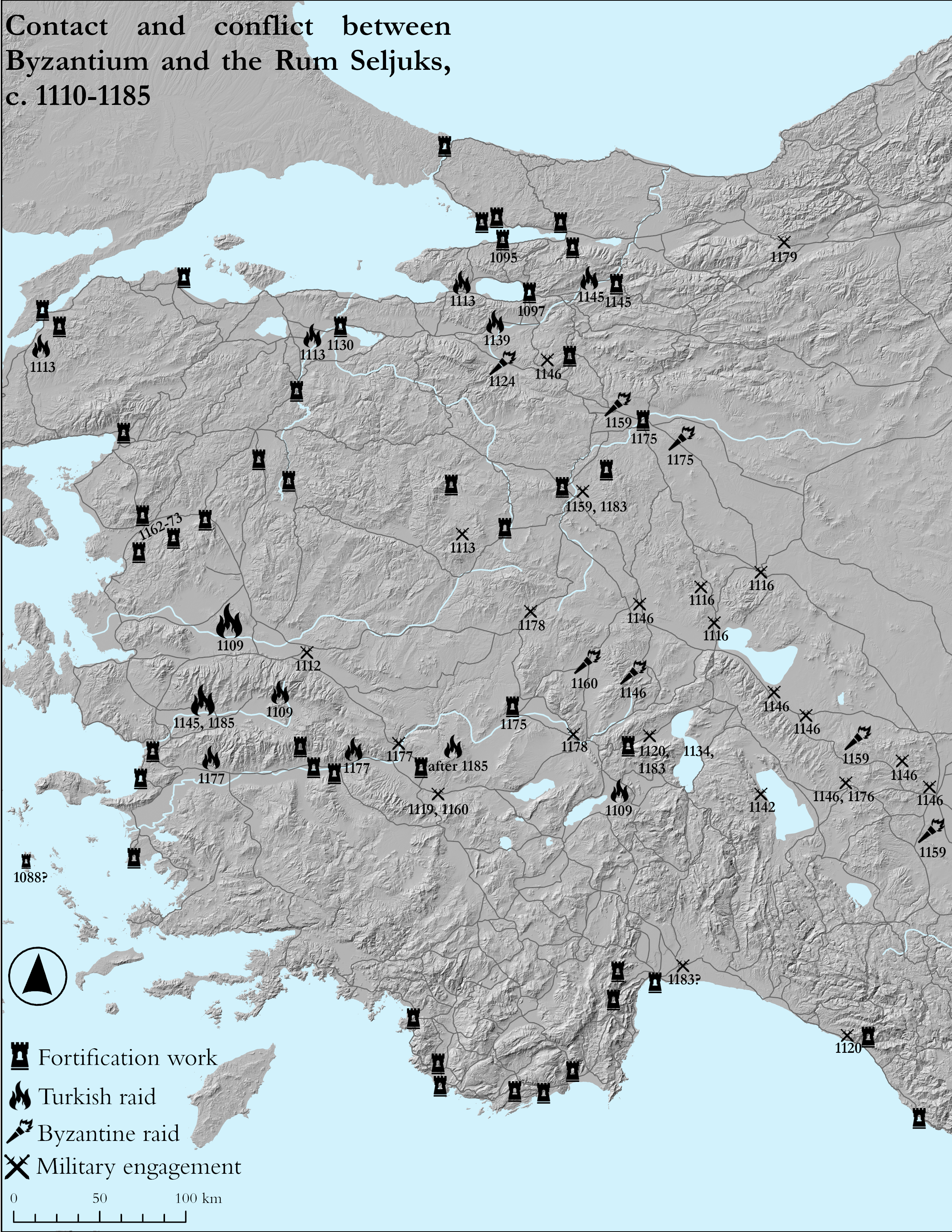
- The border conflicts between the Byzantine Empire and the Sultanate of Rum, c. 1110–1185
Date	1175–1179
Location	Meander Valley, Bithynia and Central Anatolia
Result	Byzantine victory
Territorial changes	Status quo ante bellum

Belligerents
Byzantine Empire Supported by: Kingdom of Hungary; Principality of Antioch; Grand Principality of Serbia	Sultanate of Rum

Commanders and leaders
Manuel I Komnenos (WIA); Andronikos Kontostephanos; John Komnenos Vatatzes; Andronikos Komnenos Vatazes †; Theodore Mavrozomes; Constantine Makrodoukas; John Kantakouzenos †; Michael Gabras; Andronikos Lampardas; Andronikos Angelos Doukas; Constantine Doukas; John Doukas; Manuel Kantakouzenos; Michael Aspietes †; Baldwin of Antioch †; Ampud; Leustach I Rátót; Katides of Laodikeia; Shahinshah; Manuel Xeros	Kilij Arslan II; Salayman; Ikhtiyar al-Din Hasan ibn Ghafras; Atapakos †

Units involved
Byzantine army; Hungarian contingents; Serbian contingents; Antiochian contingents; Cuman mercenaries; Latin mercenaries	Army of the sultanate; Turkoman nomads

Strength
At Myriokephalon: 25,000–40,000 (Note: John Haldon places the size of the Byzantine expeditionary force in 1176 at roughly 25,000–30,000 men, while John Birkenmeier estimates the total force at 30,000–40,000 - a logistical footprint corroborated by contemporary accounts detailing an immense baggage train of roughly 3,000 supply wagons required to sustain an army of this magnitude through arid Anatolian terrain.)	At Hyelion and Leimocheir: 20,000–24,000

Casualties and losses
Heavy	Heavy
- The towns of Tralles, Antioch, Louma and Pentacheir were sacked

The Byzantine–Seljuk War c. 1175–1179 was a military conflict fought between the Byzantine Empire and the Sultanate of Rum. After years of disregarding the 1161/62 agreement with the Byzantines, while attempting to form a coalition against them, Sultan Kilij Arslan II began conquering the neighbouring Danishmendid emirates. As a response, Emperor Manuel I Komnenos demanded the handover of the captured territories, as had been agreed in the treaty, but the sultan failed to comply. The emperor then rebuilt the abandoned frontier fortresses of Dorylaion and Soublaion while under attack, and initiated a large-scale operation for the ensuing year. By 1176, the war reached its climax, as the Byzantine army was ambushed and defeated at the Tzivritze pass, en route towards the Seljuk capital of Iconium. Despite the defeat, Byzantine forces remained largely intact, and in the ensuing years they were able to inflict a series of defeats against Seljuk forces at Hyelion and Leimocheir, at Claudiopolis, and later at the Meander River, forcing the sultan to sue for peace in 1179.

== Background ==
=== Treaty of Constantinople ===
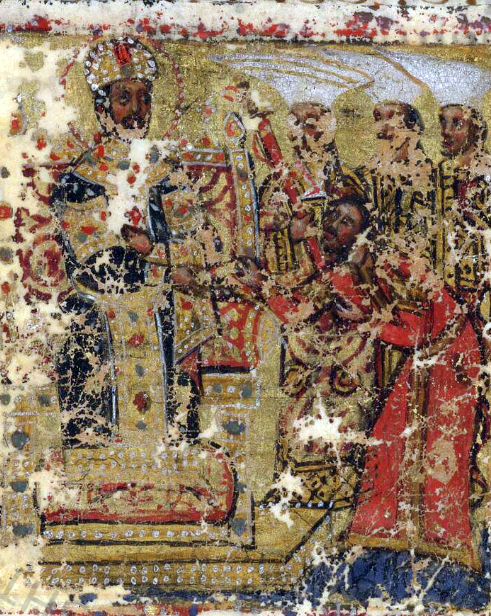
Miniature of Emperor Manuel I Komnenos c. 1179, Vatican Library

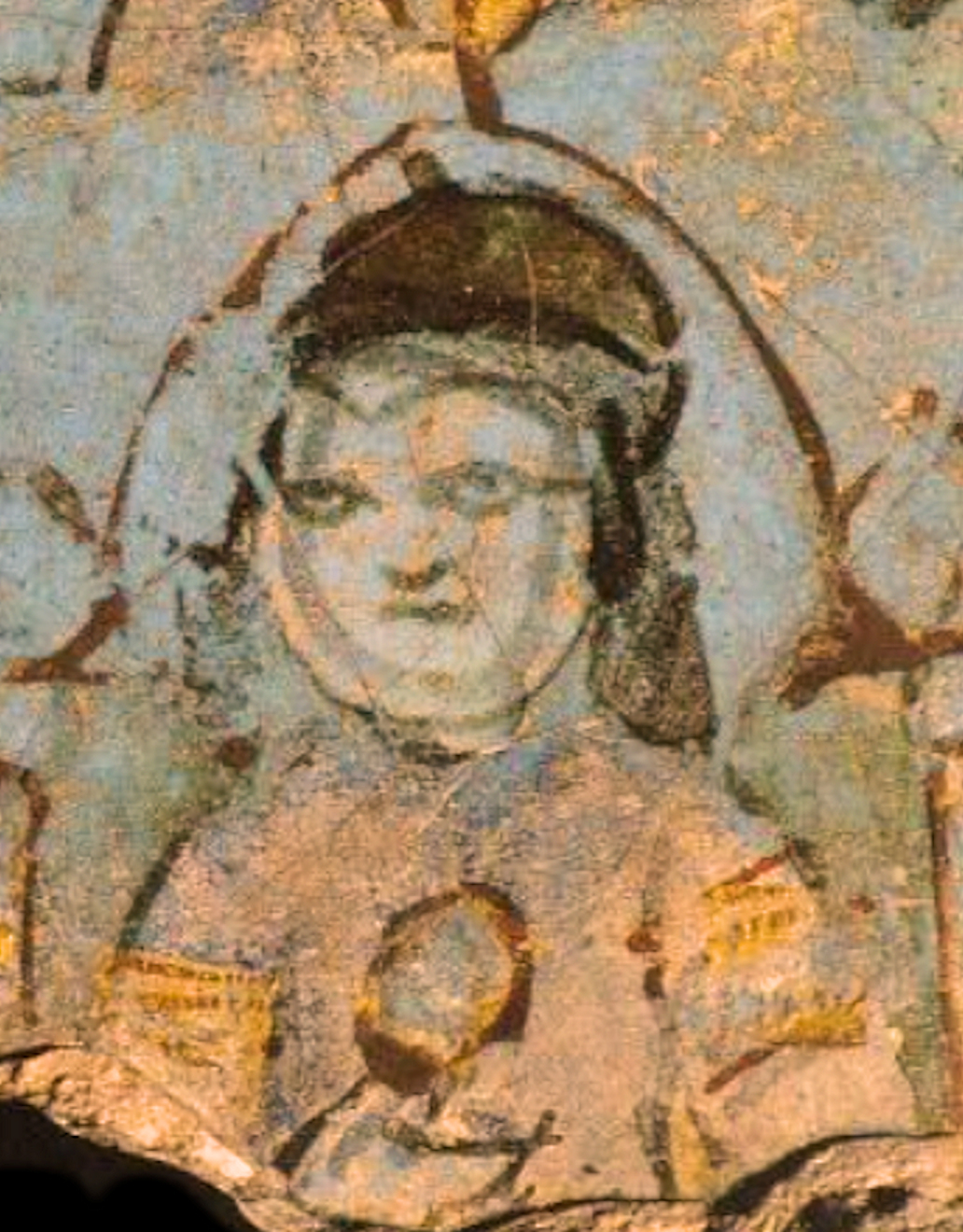
Depiction of Sultan Kilij Arslan II in a tile from the Alaeddin Palace

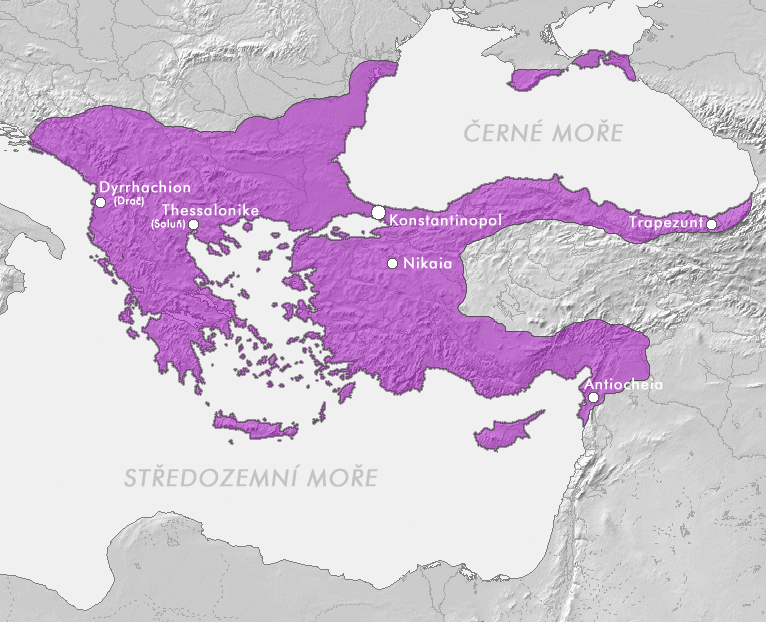
The Byzantine Empire c. 1176

Following the Seljuk defeats in the previous Byzantine–Seljuk war, amidst increased military pressure on multiple fronts and internal rebellions during the climax of the war, Sultan Kilij Arslan II was forced to travel to Constantinople in person to make peace. He arrived in the Boukoleon Palace in 1161, or in spring 1162, whereupon he appeared before the imperial court in an outward display of submission, and after multiple displays of splendour, he was ceremoniously adopted as a son by Manuel I. According to the peace settlement, the sultan was to surrender all notable cities he had previously captured, was obligated to remain hostile to the emperor's enemies, provide soldiers for the emperor's campaigns, promised to prevent Turkoman raids on the empire's territories, and acknowledged imperial suzerainty over the Sultanate of Rum through a series of oaths and pledges.

=== Agreement for Sebasteia ===
After the sultan returned to Iconium, Manuel I further gifted him with gold and silver coins, luxuriant raiment, silver beakers, golden Theriklean vessels, linens, and other ornaments. The sultan, in turn, promised to reconquer the city of Sebasteia for the Byzantines in 1162/63. The emperor then dispatched Constantine Gabras to send the sultan more gifts, as well as weapons for the ensuing conflict.

== Prelude ==
=== Expansion of Rum ===
In autumn 1164, the emir of Sebasteia, Yaghibasan, died. His wife married his nephew, Isma'il ibn Ibrahim, who inherited the city instead of Yaghibasan's three sons. Seeking to exploit the instability, Kilij Arslan II initiated an unsuccessful assault on Sebasteia, receiving nominal military support from the Byzantines due to their alliance. Despite the failure to capture the city, Kilij Arslan II had managed to subjugate the majority of the emirate's lands, including the regions of Albistan, Darende, Geduk, and the Tohma River in 1165. However, the sultan broke his promise, and did not return the conquered lands back to Byzantine imperial control.

Between 1162 and 1169, Manuel I was preoccupied in a prolonged war against Hungary and a joint expedition against the Fatimids in Egypt, limiting his attention on the Anatolian frontier. Kilij Arslan II attacked the Danishmendids of Caesarea and Tzamandos, forcing their emir, Dhu al-Nun, to flee to the court of Nur al-Din Zengi in Damascus. In the same year, he also forced his brother, Shahinshah, ruler of Ancyra and Gangra, to accept his authority.

In August 1164, Nur al-Din Zengi defeated a combined coalition between Antioch, Tripoli, and Byzantium at the Battle of Harim. Thus, Manuel I initially permitted his subject Kilij Arslan II to expand his sultanate at the expense of the weakened Danishmendids, who were under Zengid protection. In 1172, Isma'il ibn Ibrahim and his wife were killed in a coup. Because of this, the sultan quickly invaded Sebasteia for a second time, but Nur al-Din Zengi ordered him to stop, and instead sent Dhu al-Nun to take over the city.

=== Failed Muslim coalition against Byzantium ===
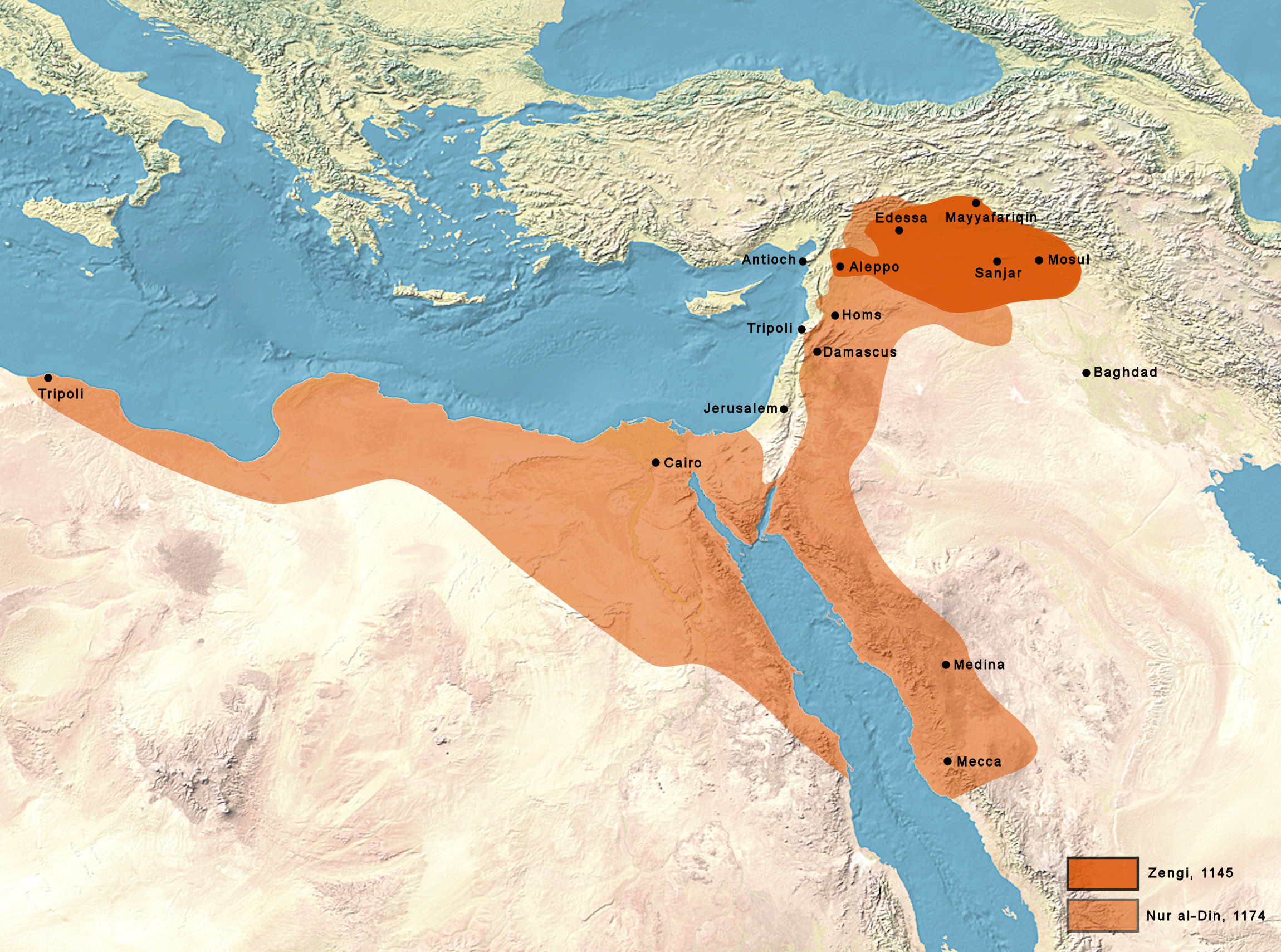
Territory controlled by the Zengids in 1145 and 1174

In 1173, from his centre of power at Lykaonia, Kilij Arslan II allied himself with Nur al-Din Zengi, Prince Mleh of Cilician Armenia, and Shahinshah, agreeing to launch a combined attack against the Byzantines. After learning of their alliance, Manuel quickly marched eastwards and set camp near Philadelphia. Seeking to break up the emerging alliance through diplomatic means, the emperor first wrote and sent envoys to Kilij Arslan II, accusing the sultan of faithlessness and warmongering for he had suddenly taken up arms against the Byzantines. The sultan alleged that the Abbasid Caliph, Al-Mustadi, was angered by his close friendship with the empire, and had therefore pressured him to abandon his previous relations with Constantinople. The sultan then sent the Byzantine envoys back without reaching an agreement. Manuel responded by dispatching a second embassy bearing a more direct warning.

His message to the sultan was as follows:

If it has from some time back seemed right to you, combined with others of your fellows, to attack the Romans, abandon your rashness. Place a guard on your land, since the Romans’ army will reach it within fifteen days.

Alarmed by the threat, Kilij Arslan II abandoned his plans and sought terms of peace. The coalition began to break apart, as a substantial portion of those aligned with the sultan defected to the emperor. John Kinnamos describes the emperor's success as a “bloodless triumph”, before recording his return to the capital. Encouraged by the news, King Amalric I of Jerusalem and Prince Bohemond III of Antioch promptly moved against the forces of Aleppo and inflicted considerable damage upon them.

=== Further expansion of Rum ===
The circumstances drastically shifted following the deaths of Amalric and Nur al-Din in 1174. Nur al-Din's death removed a powerful political counterweight to Rum in Syria and changed the balance of power in the Islamic world, as the Danishmendids were left vulnerable and without external protection. In early 1175, Kilij Arslan II, who had previously benefited considerably from Manuel's financial support, subsequently expanded his authority at the expense of neighbouring rulers. He occupied Sebasteia, Neokaisareia, Doceia, Comana, and other towns in Cappadocia, while he also removed his brother Shahinshah from Ancyra. As a result, the Turkoman rulers Dhu al-Nun and Shahinshah fled to Constantinople.

=== Turkoman raids ===
During that time, Turkoman raiders also appeared in the cities of the Phrygian Pentapolis. Manuel I drove the nomads away and refortified the cities of Pergamon, Adramyttium, and Ghliara, built new fortresses in nearby plains, and established the Theme of Neokastra, increasing agricultural production.

According to the Byzantine historian Niketas Choniates, the sultan falsely claimed that the Turkomans were acting independently:

Sulayman, the highest ranking official in the sultan's court, in an audience with the emperor spoke vigorously in the sultan's defense, declaring that the Turks had acted against his wishes. Offering other such specious arguments but describing conditions that were not in accordance with the facts, he was caught in the offense of lying; [...] He sent Sulayman back to the sultan to set forth those things of which he was not ignorant and to taunt him for the untrustworthiness, faithlessness, and wickedness of his ways, and to warn him that should he not desist from these actions, he would suffer the vengeance of the Romans.

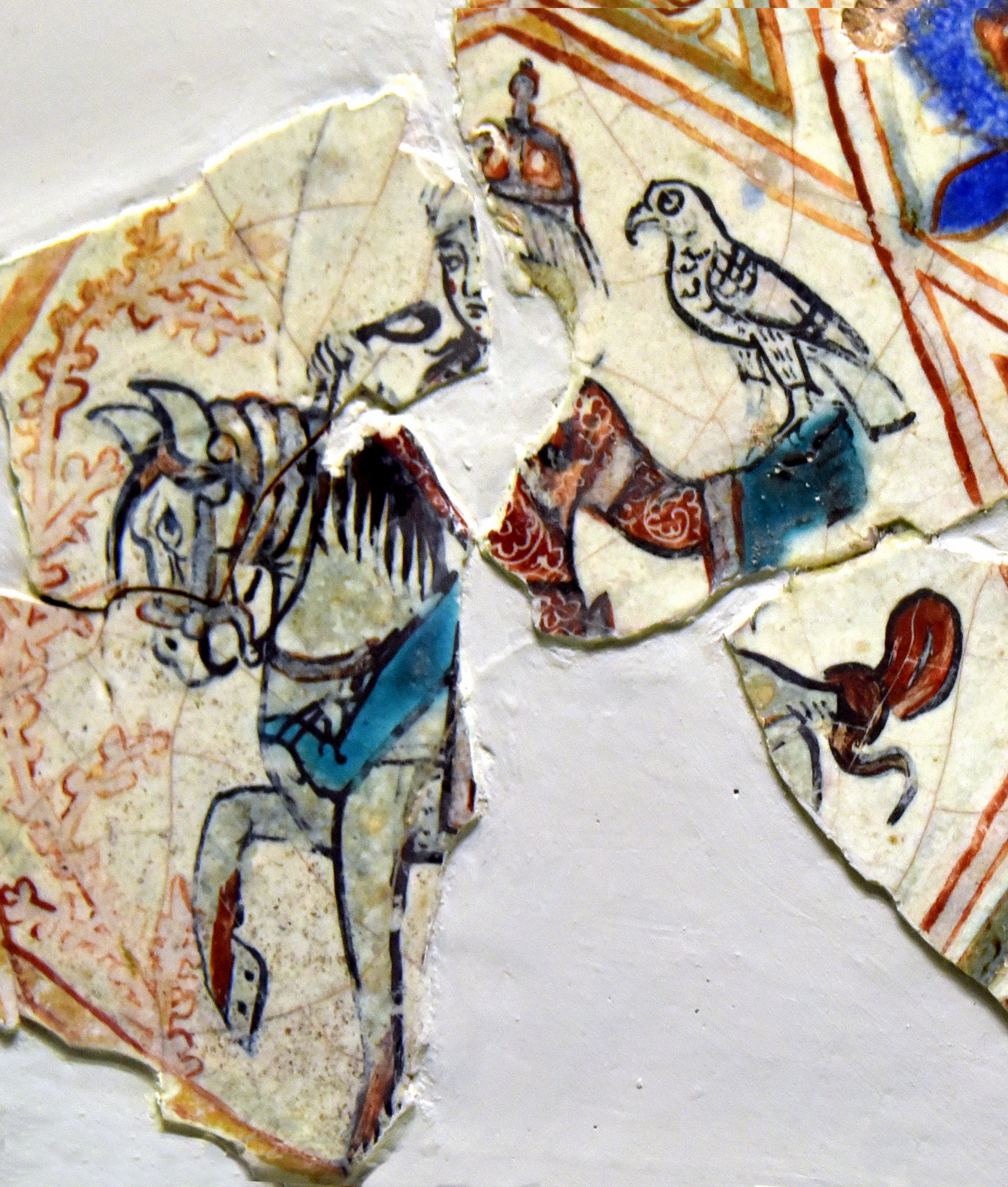
Tile depicting a royal hunt, from the Alaeddin Palace, late 12th century

Afterwards, the Turkomans invaded again and sacked Laodikeia, slayed its bishop, Solomon, and killed or captured much of its population and livestock. According to Niketas Choniates:

The sultan remarked to his intimates sarcastically that the more injuries he inflicted on the Romans, the more treasures he received from the emperor. "It is customary," he said, "for gifts to be gladly given to conquerors so that they should not desire to advance their conquests, just as festering diseases require numerous treatments so that they should not spread and increase further".

=== Later incidents ===
As the sultan was indirectly attacking the empire and seizing cities for himself in violation of the treaty, and was in the process of conquering most of central and eastern Anatolia, Manuel assembled an army to march against Iconium, after he had finished campaigning in Europe. Upon learning of Byzantine military preparations, Kilij Arslan II sent envoys to the emperor and offered to comply with his demands, and even to help the Byzantine forces garrison a number of Turkoman-controlled cities Manuel desired. The emperor appointed Alexios Petraliphas to lead 6,000 men and occupy these settlements. However when the imperial army approached, the sultan warned the cities of the approaching Byzantines, forced them to surrender to him instead, and then refused to hand them over to Manuel I, despite what had been agreed.

Meanwhile, the city of Amaseia, formerly held by Shahinshah, was about to surrender itself to imperial control. For this reason, the emperor dispatched the Sebastos Michael Gabras to Paphlagonia with a small force, and ordered him to recruit soldiers from Trebizond and Oinaion, and then march towards the city. When the general reached Amaseia, the people inside invited him in, but since another army sent from Ikonion was also encamped nearby, Michael hesitated and suspected the citizens of treachery. The citizens of Amaseia gave the Byzantines hostages and offered them the city's citadel, but Michael was still suspicious. As the citizens began to worry about imperial inactivity and possible Turkoman reprisals, they surrendered the city to the Seljuks, and Michael withdrew while abandoning the soldiers inside the citadel.

At the same time, the emperor crossed the Strait of Damalis, and went to Melangeia. There, he assembled a force from the villages of Bithynia and the Rhyndakos River, and headed to the plains of Dorylaeum in order to resupply fortresses, encourage hostility against the sultan, and rebuild Dorylaeum itself.

== Byzantine–Seljuk war ==
=== Dorylaeum and Soublaion ===
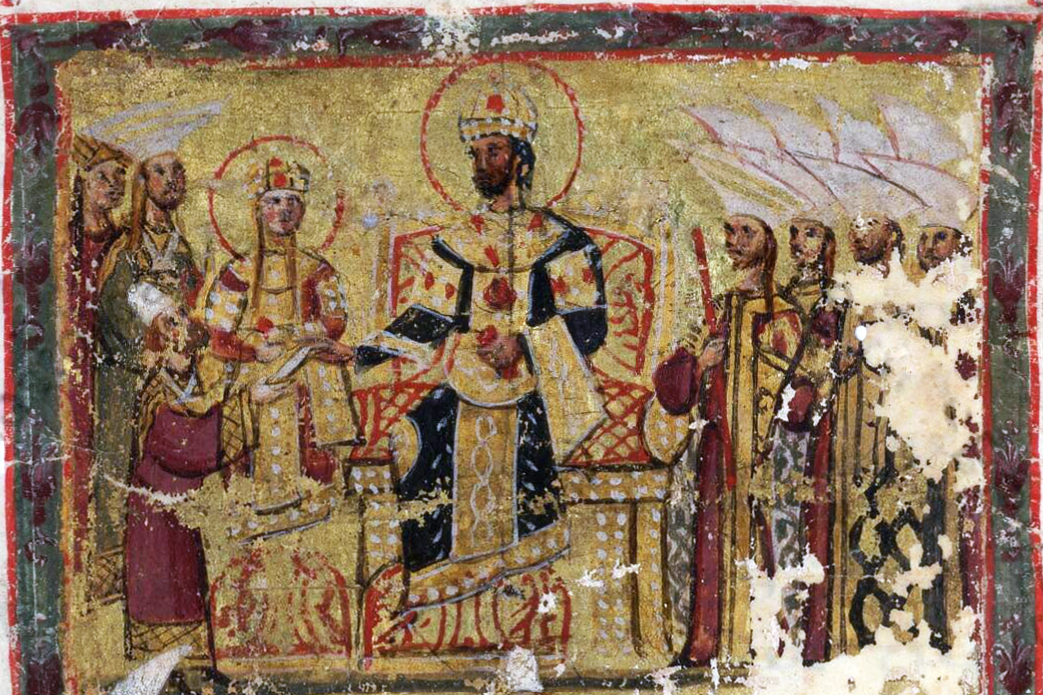
Miniature depicting Emperor Manuel I Komnenos sitting next to his son Alexios II

In order to secure his flanks for further campaigns, the emperor spent the final months of 1175 executing massive engineering projects to rebuild and refortify the strategic frontier bases of Dorylaeum and Soublaion under the protection of his army. After defeating a force of 2,000 Turkomans near the ruins of Dorylaeum, Manuel established a fortified camp in the vicinity to protect his army during its subsequent project to rebuild the city. Notwithstanding their initial defeat, Seljuk contingents soon arrived to harass and frustrate the Byzantines engineering efforts, as the pasture lands near Dorylaeum were important for the herds of livestock necessary for Turkoman pastoralism, but Manuel led a number of sallies from his encampment against these nomadic bands. Following a series of skirmishes and battles, the Seljuks were ultimately defeated, as the Byzantines set ambuscades in some instances and engaged the Turkoman cavalry directly in others, although Choniates also records one skirmish in which the Seljuks defeated a Byzantine party by utilizing a feigned retreat. As the Turkomans were worsted and put to flight in most of these encounters and hotly pursued by Manuel I's men, they were repeatedly forced to set fire to their nearby tents and crops in order to prevent the supplies within from falling into Byzantine hands. Manuel also sent the exiled Shahinshah to conduct a diversionary raid into Rum territory from Paphlagonia. However, this Byzantine raiding force was itself ambushed by a Seljuk contingent before reaching Paphlagonia, killing a number of Byzantine troops in the encounter, and forcing Shahinshah to retreat. In spite of this setback and the desertion of contingents of the army to return to their homes over the course of the Dorylaeum project, the emperor's military actions proved successful. Within 40 days, the Byzantines succeeded in erecting a fortress on the sight, though the restored Dorylaeum was smaller in dimension the previous settlement.

While encamped at Dorylaeum, Manuel I learned of the events that had occurred in Amaseia. He ordered for Michael Gabras to be imprisoned, and sent the eunuch Thomas as an emissary to Kilij Arslan II, demanding the city to be returned and accusing the sultan of breaking his oaths. The sultan sent the emissary back, and Turkomans almost killed him on the way back home.

Manuel I placed a garrison of troops and a number of Greek and Latin settlers inside Dorylaeum, and although this and the previous desertions diminished the numbers of his army, the emperor continued his campaign by advancing to Rhyndacus. He then dispatched a former Turkoman named Michael to locate and punish those soldiers who had deserted, and pressed further towards Lampe, in the vicinity of which the Byzantines restored the fortress of Soublaion on the Meander. Having established a base of operations at this position, Manuel vigorously led his troops out to fight a number of engagements against Seljuk forces in the region. Following these encounters, Manuel was satisfied with the results of his campaign and departed back to Constantinople, which he reached by January 6 1176, on Epiphany.

=== Political overtures ===
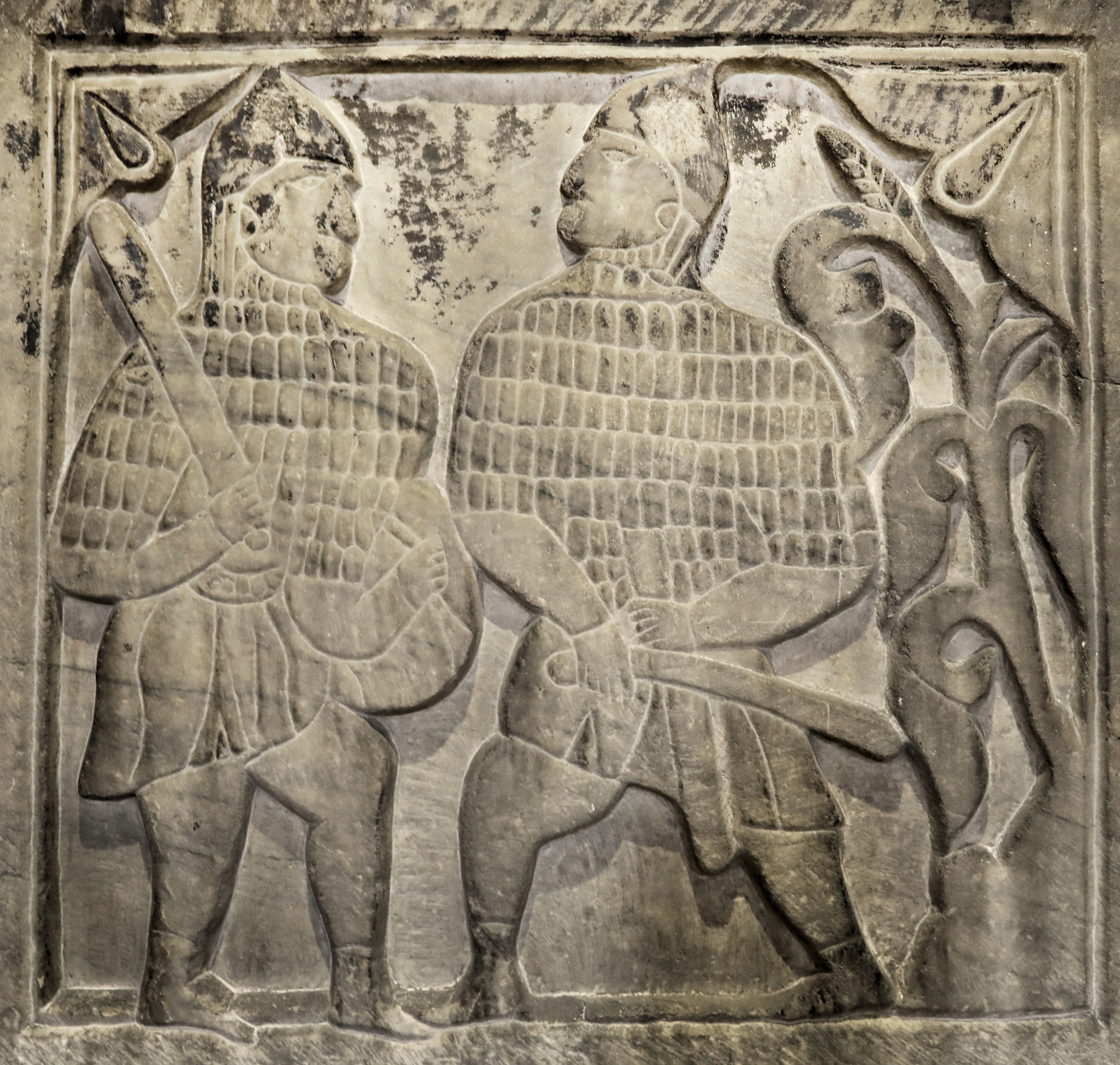
12th century inscription depicting two swordsmen from the citadel of Ikonion

Upon his arrival at Constantinople, Manuel I was received with panegyrical orations from the rhetoricians Euthymios Malakales, Eustathios of Thessalonica, and Gregory Antiochos. In praise of his military achievements and efforts to strengthen western Asia Minor. With his position and flanks secured, Manuel I began presenting the conflict as a Crusade. In a letter to Pope Alexander III, he reportedly sought to attract Western European knights to participate in his campaign against Ikonion, securing a formal crusading endorsement. In response, Alexander III wrote to the cardinal Peter of Crisogono that he had received a letter from Manuel I, in which the emperor recounted his military successes and sought western support. According to the letter:

It has come to our notice from a letter of our most dear son in Christ Manuel, the illustrious emperor of Constantinople, that he himself, with a strong force, entering the land of the Turks, has destroyed cities and castles with iron and fire, and has constructed a certain great and populous city in the middle of the land of the sultan of Ikonion, where he has placed Latins and Greeks to guard it, and by means of this city dominates a great region of the Turks, by the grace of God. He has done this to such an extent that it renders the way safe for all Christians who wish to visit the sepulchre of the Lord, both Latins and Greeks, God permitting. Hence, because the same emperor claims that he makes a firm vow and commitment in no way to abstain from the fighting of that nefarious people, we are willing to promote his pious commitment at his request, to the kings and princes of the world, and the other faithful.

The Pope requested that the cardinal convey his appeal to King Louis VII of France and the French nobility.

==== Failed negotiations ====
Realizing that Manuel I was actively mobilizing against him, Kilij Arslan II swiftly dispatched his most trusted vizier, Ikhtiyar al-Din Hasan ibn Ghafras, to Constantinople to negotiate and secure a peace agreement, offering the emperor to take any fortresses that he desired, in order to avert the campaign. However, due to the sultan's previous broken oaths, Manuel refused the diplomatic overture and instead prepared to campaign against Ikonion.

==== Preparations and march ====
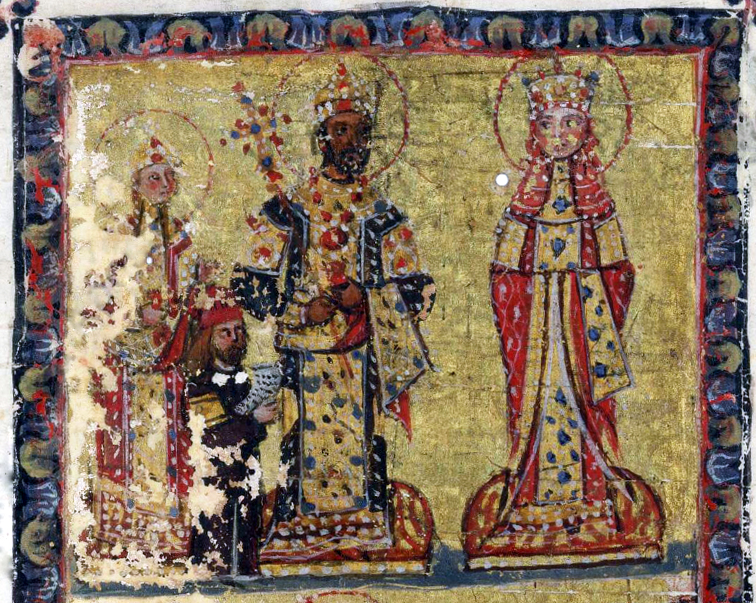
Illuminated manuscript possibly depicting Manuel I Komnenos with Maria of Antioch and their son Alexios II with Agnes of France, ca. 1179

In the spring, summer, or fall of 1176, Manuel I raised a large multi-divisional army and recruited Latin and Danubian Cuman mercenaries. He departed from Constantinople, crossed into Anatolia, and assembled his forces at Lopadion on the Rhyndakos River. However, his allied Hungarian and Serbian contingents failed to arrive at the expected time, forcing the emperor to postpone the main advance. It was during this delay at Lopadion, when the local inhabitants of Neokaisareia offered to shift their allegiance to Manuel I. Seeking to neutralize the Seljuk threat in the north, he dispatched a diversionary column under his nephew, Andronikos Vatatzes, through Paphlagonia, towards Neokaisareia and Amaseia. Once the main forces at Lopadion were unified, the emperor initiated his march southwards, advancing into Phrygia via Laodikeia and Chonai, where he visited the Church of the Archangel Michael. Manuel I then proceeded through the valley of Lampe torwards Kelainai-Apameia, situated near the headwaters of the Maeander and the Marsyas rivers. He then continued through Choma, and stopped at the abandoned fortress of Myriokephalon. (Note: According to historian Anthony Kaldellis, the location of the battle, as given by Niketas Choniates, is wrong, even though the name of Myriokephalon he gave has since remained in historiography.)

During the march, the army, which was slowed down due to its large baggage train and unarmed men, was constantly harassed by Turkoman nomads, whom Kilij Arslan II had recruited from Mesopotamia. Groups of 5,000–10,000 nomads would attack portions of the army and engage in light skirmishes. The Seljuks employed scorched earth tactics, burning villages and grasslands, while contaminating wells, springs and cisterns with dead bodies of donkeys and dogs. Due to the contamination of water sources, the Byzantine army was grievously afflicted with dysentery. The disease spread rapidly through both the ranks and the animals, causing widespread mortality. At that point, the sultan also sent envoys to Manuel I, asking for peace in exchange for granting the emperor's wishes. Upon his refusal, the Seljuks occupied the pass of Tzivritze.

==== Ambush ====
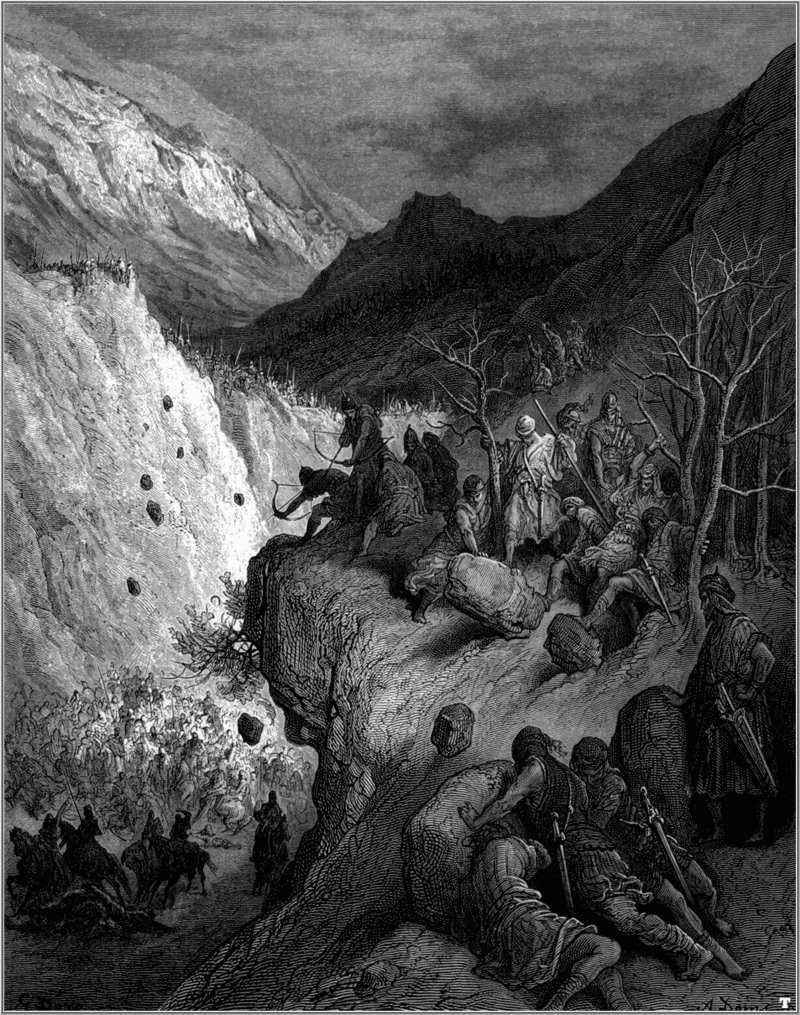
Illustration of the Battle of Myriokephalon by Gustave Doré

Manuel I was warned by his commanders of the dangers of an ambush, but the emperor took no precautions to drive the nomads from the pass using light troops, but instead attempted to cross quickly with his wagons carrying the siege engines. On 17 September, as the army passed through the Tzivritze Pass, the Turkomans emerged from the mountains and attacked the army. The Byzantine vanguard climbed the slopes and forced the Seljuks to retreat to higher grounds, however the rest of the army did not take such precautions. By the time the first two Byzantine divisions exited the pass, and the rear was about to enter it, the Turkomans descended and attacked the centre of the column, which was passing through. The Latin contingent was annihilated, while the rest of the Byzantine army lost cohesion, as soldiers were attempting to flee. The baggage train was targeted and destroyed. Morale was also lost when the Turkomans raised the dismembered head of Andronikos Vatatzes on a lance. At that moment, a sandstorm also approached, which confused both the Byzantines and Seljuks, making them kill their own men. According to Choniates, Manuel I himself suffered many wounds and bruises from swords and maces, while his shield was pierced with arrows. Eventually, discipline was reestablished by the emperor and his commanders, and the Byzantine army managed to leave the pass and regroup. Kilij Arslan II launched attacks against the Byzantine camp at night and unsuccessfully tried to convince the Cumans to abandon the Byzantines.

Even though he had inflicted heavy casualties upon them, Kilij Arslan II's forces had also been battered. The Seljuks even scalped and mutilated the genitals of fallen Turkomans, in order to hide their own casualties, so that their dead could not be distinguished from those of the Byzantines in the heat of battle.

Still afraid of an imperial army so close to Ikonion, while his advisors were also calling for peace, he ordered for the fighting to cease and sent Hasan ibn Ghafras to the emperor's camp to negotiate terms.

==== Aftermath of the battle ====
According to Niketas Choniates:

On being received by the emperor, Gabras rendered a profound obeisance in the barbarian fashion, and at the same time presented as a gift from the sultan a Nisaean horse with silver-mounted bridle from among those horses kept at rack and manger for use in solemn processions, and he also presented a long, two-edged sword. [...] Gabras observed the yellowish appearance of the surcoat over the emperor's coat of mail and remarked, "This is not an auspicious color, O Emperor, but in the hour of warfare it very much militates against good fortune." Manuel, forcing a brief smile at these words, removed the surcoat embroidered with purple and gold and presented it to Gabras.

After the exchange of gifts, and during the negotiations that followed, it was agreed that the Byzantines would demolish the fortresses of Dorylaion and Soublaion. Thereafter, the Byzantine army headed back and crossed the Tzivritze Pass. However, during the march towards the capital, up until the Byzantines reached Chonai, Turkomans harassed the army, killing the stragglers and the wounded, while simultaneously raiding the surrounding countryside. Manuel I protested that this was in violation of the agreement they had just reached, but the sultan argued that he had no control over the Turkomans. After reaching Bithynia, Manuel I demolished the fortifications of Soublaion, but left those of Dorylaeum intact.

According to Choniates, when the sultan sent an embassy and requested for Dorylaeum to be demolished as well, the emperor recited the Pythia's oracle to Glaucus, son of Epikyndes:

Yet hath the Oath-God a son who is nameless, footless and handless. Mighty in strength he approaches to vengeance, and whelms in destruction. All who belong to the race, or the house of the man who is perjured. But oath-keeping men leave behind them a flourishing offspring.

On November 1176, a scale preserved by the English chronicler Roger of Howden, records that King Henry II of England received a letter from Manuel I following his defeat at Myriokephlaon in which he recites the circumstances surrounding the events and mentions the participation of several prominent Anglo-Saxons or Anglo-Norman members of the nobility present at the battle. (Note: Drocourt and Kolditz consider the presence of Anglo-Norman nobles at the battle noteworthy, considering Manuel I’s emphasis on their familial ties to Henry II. They also mention that the surviving evidence for Anglo-Byzantine interaction represents only a fraction of the exchanges between the two courts, including the presumably verbal reports delivered by the nobles accompanying the emperor. Henry II also sent an English knight to Constantinople in 1176 to convey his respects, while other diplomatic exchanges included the dispatch of a pack of bloodhounds to Manuel I.)

According to Howden’s account of the letter:

Some of the chief men of your nobility were with us, and they will inform you on all the circumstances in the order in which they happened […] we have still deemed it advisable to inform you upon all the events that have happened, as being our dearly beloved friend, and as being closely united with our imperial majesty by the ties of blood that exist between our children.

=== Hyelion and Leimocheir ===
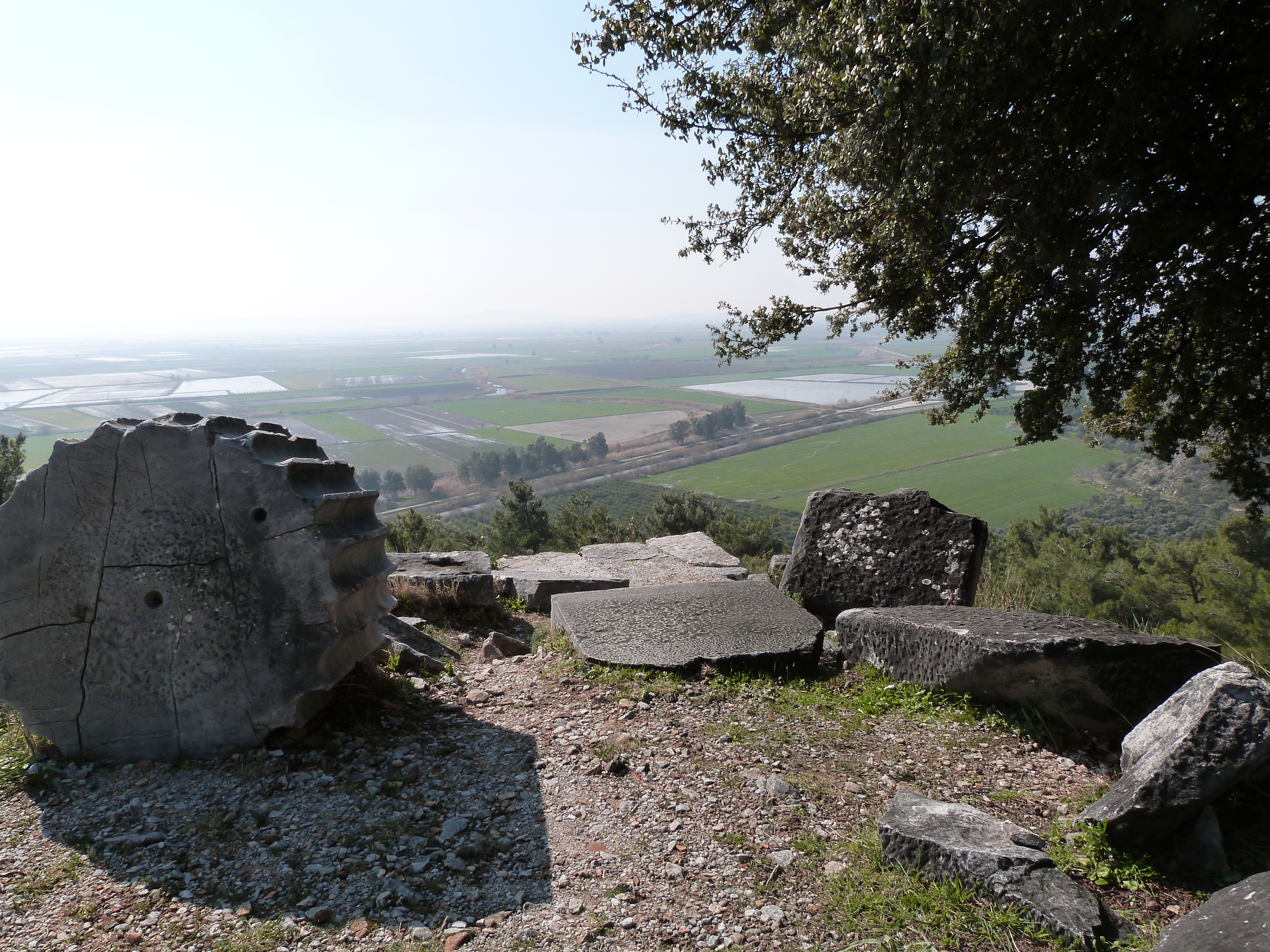
View of the Meander River Valley from the ruins of ancient Greek city of Priene

Turkoman raids drastically increased after the Battle of Myriokephalon, and it is likely during this time that the fortress of Choma was destroyed by the Turks. In 1177, Kilij Arslan II sent Atapakos with an army of 24,000 to pillage western Anatolia. The Turkomans crossed into the Meander Valley and sacked Tralles, Antioch, Louma, Pentacheir, and other towns. The raiders then plundered the coastal regions of Asia Minor. Manuel I raised an imperial army under John Komnenos Vatatzes, Constantine Doukas, and Michael Aspietes. The Byzantine army intercepted the Seljuks as they were heading back into central Anatolia with plunder, split in two columns, and attacked them as they were crossing a bridge near the fortresses of Hyelion and Leimocheir, flanking them from both sides of a river. Atapakos unsuccessfully attempted to rally his forces, but eventually he was killed while trying to escape. The Seljuk army was annihilated with few survivors.

=== Panasion, Lakerion and Charax ===
The victory at Hyelion and Leimmocheir emboldened Manuel I to expel the nomads from Panasion, Lakerion, and Charax. The emperor soundly defeated the Turkomans at Panasion, and then sent Katides of Laodikeia to reconnoiter the ones at Lakerion. However, Katides told the nomads about the emperor's arrival, and thus the Turkomans retreated before the main Byzantine force could arrive. Manuel I punished Katides and appointed Andronikos Angelos to expel the Turkomans from Charax, but Andronikos abandoned his forces during a night engagement, causing them to break rank and retreat.

=== Claudiopolis ===
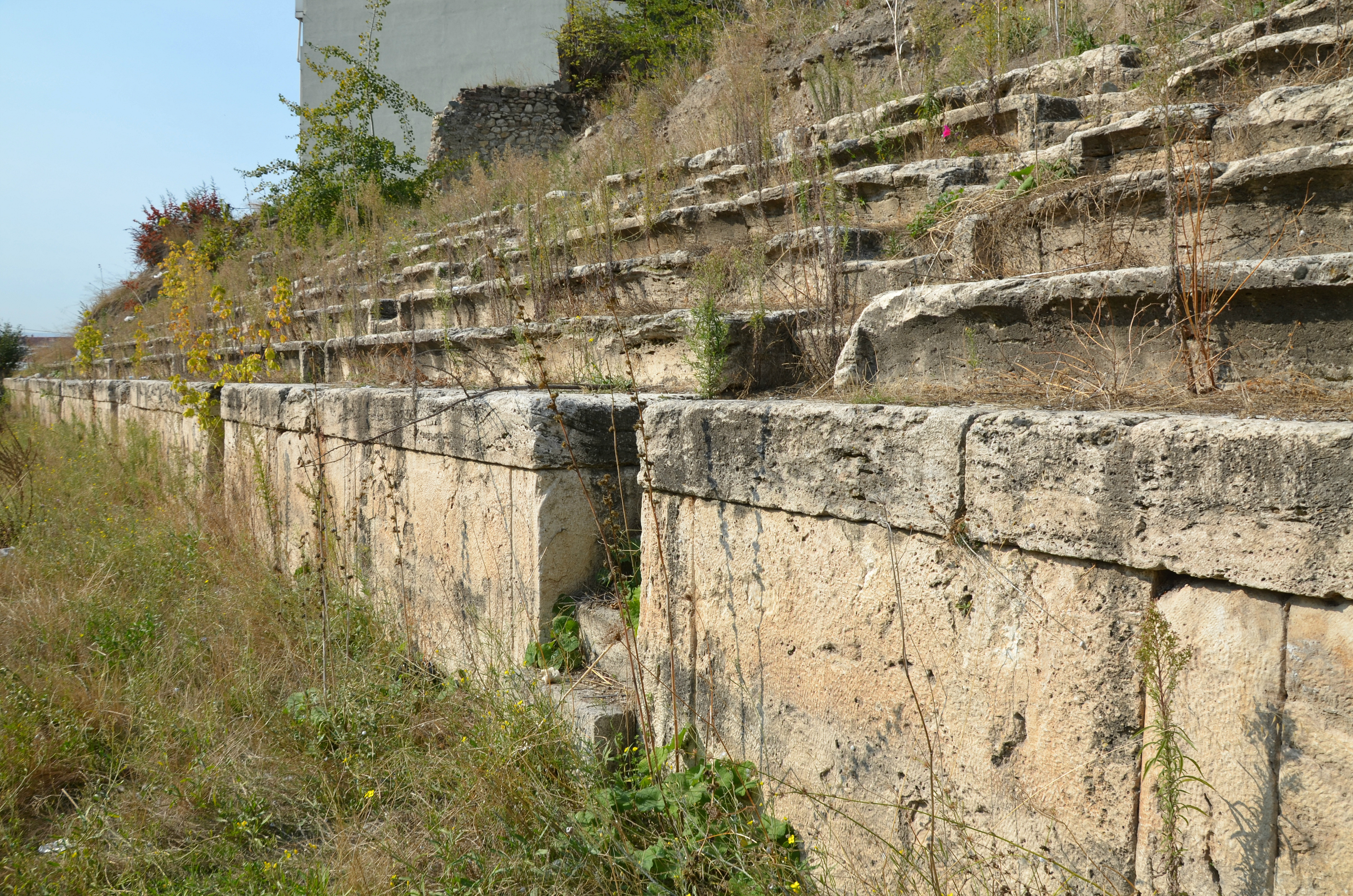
Ruins of the stadium of Claudiopolis

In the fall of 1179, the Seljuks invested the city of Claudiopolis. The garrison threatened to surrender the city if help did not arrive, as food supplies were limited. After learning of the news, the emperor quickly marched torwards Claudiopolis, through Nicomedia. Once the Turkomans spotted the imperial standards of the approaching army, they began retreating. Manuel I pressed the advance and pursued the fleeing nomads. A large number of Seljuk warriors were captured during this final campaign of Manuel I, and it was likely the relief of Claudiopolis and the emperor's follow-up operations in pursuit that led Robert of Torigni to claim that he had avenged his prior defeat at Mariyokephlon, and that the sultan himself had evacuated Iconium.

=== Peace settlement ===
In 1179, a letter exchange between Manuel I and the Holy Roman Emperor Frederick Barbarossa decreed that the sultan of Rum had sued for peace with the Byzantines, and had submitted to similar terms as had been decreed in the 1161/62 treaty of Constantinople. According to the letter, written in gold:

[...] the sultan surrendered to our empire, sending envoys to ask for mercy, and he performed homage to our empire, and he promised on oath to serve us against all men with his army, so as to be friend of our friends and enemy of our enemies.

However, the German emperor also received Seljuk emissaries in the same year claiming the opposite, while Kilij Arslan II also allegedly offered to convert the Turkomans of Rum to Christianity, in order to secure a marriage alliance with Barbarossa. This led historian Paul Magdalino to conclude that the war and peace treaty in 1179 had been unfavourable to the Seljuks, to such a degree that the sultan began to seek German support against the Byzantines.

=== Meander River ===
In 1180, the Byzantine army won another victory over the Seljuks after enveloping their forces near the Meander River, before defeating them in a battle. A large number of the Seljuk troops were slain or drowned in the river, including commanding figures within their army, which Gregory Antiochos refers to as "satraps". (Note: Due to similarities in tactical details, it is possible that Antiochos' passage relates to the Battle of Hyelion and Leimocheir in 1177, but the historian Andrew Stone considers it more likely that Antiochos is describing a separate Byzantine victory over the Seljuks won in 1180.) Antiochos likened the battle to previous successes achieved by Manuel I in the region. The battle likely represented an early Seljuk attempt to renege on the unfavourable peace concluded in 1179, possibly encouraged by the ailing health or death of Manuel I.

== Aftermath ==
=== Destabilization of Anatolia ===
Map of the territorial decline of Byzantine Asia Minor during the Third Crusade c. 1189–1192.

==== Byzantine crises ====
Following the death of Manuel I in 1180, multiple crises engulfed the empire. Andronikos I Komnenos usurped the throne from Alexios II, the Normans launched their third invasion of the Balkans, the Bulgarians rebelled under Asen and Peter and were reinforced by Vlach and Cuman allies after 1186, while the Hungarians and Serbs broke ties with Byzantium and invaded imperial territory. For the next 24 years, the Anatolian frontier rapidly collapsed, as a series of rebellions were supported by Turkomans who came in for plunder.

The deteriorating situation was made worse when Andronikos I withdrew the armies of Paphlagonia, Nicaea, and the Thracesian Theme, in order to fight Andronikos Angelos' forces in spring 1182, following which Western Anatolia became wracked by a series of rebellions. John Komnenos Vatatzes, who had previously won numerous victories against Turkoman attacks, pulled forces from the frontier to lead a rebellion against Andronikos, and defeated the loyalist army under Andronikos Lampardas near Philadelphia before dying on 16 May 1182. Also in 1182 Kilij Arslan II's forces broke the treaty and captured Sozopolis, ravaging the surrounding villages. Cotyaeum was sacked, and Attaleia put under siege. After Isaac II Angelos usurped the throne in 1185, the sultan sent the emir Same to raid Celbianum, capturing large numbers of inhabitants and livestock. In a letter to Michael the Syrian, Kilij Arslan II claimed to have taken over 72 places from the Byzantines.

==== Theodore Mangaphas ====
In 1188/89, Theodore Mangaphas revolted in Philadelpheia and Lydia, was defeated by two Byzantine expeditions, but managed to flee to the court of the new Sultan Kaykhusraw I. There he was allowed to recruit an army of Turkomans, who after 1191 went on to raid the regions of Philadelpheia, Laodikeia, and Caria, destroying the Church of Archangel Michael at Chonai and enslaving Christian captives.

==== Battle of Iconium ====
Illuminated manuscript depicting the Battle of Iconium, by Master of Jouvenel, 15th century

During the Third Crusade, and after the Battle of Philomelion, the German Emperor Frederick Barbarossa marched his army against the Sultanate of Rum, storming Iconium with little resistance. A pitched battle was fought on 18 May 1190, where the larger Seljuk forces, under Prince Qutb al-Din, was routed. After the battle, Iconium was sacked, as the equivalent of 100,000 marks was looted by the Crusaders. Barbarossa's army rested there for five days, until it continued its path torwards Antioch.

Following Barbarossa's victories, Isaac II led a campaign against the Seljuks, during which the Byzantines recaptured or refortified several border fortresses, one of which was Choma. After restoring the fortress, the Byzantines renamed Choma to "Angelokastron". Isaac II was applauded by Byzantine commentators such as John Stilbes, Gregory Antiochos, John Syropoulos and George Tornikes for his successes against the Turkomans during this Campaign.

==== The Pseudo-Alexioi ====
In 1189, a rebel claiming to be Alexios II, known to history as Pseudo-Alexios, along with a Latin from the Meandrian town of Armala, travelled to Iconium, where they convinced the old Kilij Arslan II and his court that he was the true emperor. They were given gifts and allowed to raise 8,000 Turkomans under emir Arsan, in order to take the Byzantine throne. These nomads then proceeded to raid almost the whole length of the Meander River, sacking multiple towns, ravaging the region of Chonai, and completing the destruction of the Church of Archangel Michael. Due to the scale of the devastation, up until his death by the hands of a local priest in 1193, Pseudoalexius was called "the Crop-Burner" (Greek: Καυσαλώνης).

A second Pseudo-Alexios appeared in Paphlagonia, but was quickly defeated by Theodore Choumnos, taken captive, and killed. From Cilicia, a third Pseudo-Alexios appeared by the side of the emir of Ancyra, Muhi al-Din Mas 'Udshah, and subdued the Byzantine fortresses north of the city. The new Emperor Alexios III Angelos, along with Michael Kantakouzenos, launched a two-month long campaign against him, until a conspirator killed the rebel at night in the fortress of Tzoungra around 1197. However, Muhi al-Din had managed to besiege the city of Dadybra and forced it to surrender in 1196, expelling its Greek population and replacing it with Muslim colonists.

Around that time, Basil Chortatzes also rebelled at Tarsos, near Nicomedia. After some time, he was captured, blinded, and imprisoned.

=== Renewal in conflict ===
Territorial expansion of the Sultanate of Rum c. 1100–1243

As the civil wars continued, Kaykhusraw I invaded the Meander River Valley, sacked many settlements, and took away captive 5,000 people from the towns of Karia and Tantalos, but failed to take Antioch, after mistaking wedding celebrations inside the city for martial music of a defending army. In early 1199, the emperor sent Andronikos Doukas to fight against the Turkomans, and he killed many of the nomads of the emir Arsanes, along with their herds. Simultaneously, the emperor travelled to Nicaea and Prusa, in order to better protect the region against the nomads of the Bathys region. The following year in 1200, Alexios III led a brief campaign into Anatolia wherein he suppressed a brewing mutiny among the troops and defeated Turkoman raiding columns. In 1201, the new Sultan Rukn al-Din attacked Byzantium, while a tax official from Mylasa, named Michael, rebelled. Michael was defeated, but fled to the court of Rukn al-Din and received a Turkoman army, with which he raided the Meander. According to historian Speros Vryonis:

In the twenty-five years that had elapsed since the death of Manuel, effective central authority in Asia Minor had been seriously threatened. The great internal weakening of the state and the successive blows it received from the Latins and Balkan peoples made it virtually impossible to halt the gradual Turkish westward infiltration, and this progress of the nomads on the borders was greatly aided by the Byzantine rebels who arose in western Anatolia. What remained of Byzantine military forces was consumed in civil strife, the rebels most often appealing to the sultans and Turkmen chiefs for aid, and these latter very gladly assisted in a process that could only benefit them.

The process of destabilisation continued, until the whole empire collapsed as a result of the Fourth Crusade and the Sack of Constantinople in 1204, causing Anatolia to be split between local warlords, until the emergence and consolidation of the region under the Empire of Nicaea, the Empire of Trebizond, and the territories of Manuel Maurozomes.

== Bibliography ==
=== Primary sources ===
- Choniates, Niketas (1984). Historia. English translation: Magoulias, Harry J. (O City of Byzantium: Annals of Niketas Choniates). Detroit. ISBN 0-8143-1764-2.
- Kinnamos, John (1976). Deeds of John and Manuel Comnenus. Translated by Brand, Charles M. New York: Columbia University Press. ISBN 0-231-04080-6.
- William of Tyre (1943). Historia Rerum in Partibus Transmarinis Gestarum [A History of Deeds Done Beyond the Sea]. Translated by Babcock, Emily Atwater; Krey, A. C. Columbia University Press.

=== Secondary sources ===
- Angold, Michael (2008). Shepard, Jonathan (ed.). The Cambridge History of the Byzantine Empire, c. 500–1492. Cambridge University Press.
- Birkenmeier, John W. (2002). The Development of the Komnenian Army: 1081–1180. Boston: Brill. ISBN 90-04-11710-5.
- Davidson, Alistair James (2017). ‘The Glory of Ruling Makes All Things Permissible’: Power and Usurpation in Byzantium: Some Aspects of Communication, Legitimacy, and Moral Authority (Thesis). University of Birmingham.
- Drocourt, Nicolas; Kolditz, Sebastian, eds. (2021). A Companion to Byzantium and the West, 900–1204. Brill. ISBN 978-90-04-49879-2.
- Finlay, George (1877). A History of Greece. Vol. III. Oxford: Clarendon Press.
- Ahrweiler, Hélène (1966). "Chôma-Aggélokastron". Revue des études byzantines (in French). 24.
- Kaldellis, Anthony (2022). "The Chronology of the Reign of Alexios III Komnenos for the years 1198–1202 AD and its Implications". Byzantina Symmeikta. 32.
- Kaldellis, Anthony (2023). The New Roman Empire: A History of Byzantium. New York: Oxford University Press. ISBN 978-0197549322.
- Loud, G. A. (2010). The Crusade of Frederick Barbarossa: The History of the Expedition of the Emperor Frederick and Related Texts. Ashgate Publishing. ISBN 9780754665755.
- Magdalino, Paul (1993). The Empire of Manuel I Komnenos, 1143–1180. New York: Cambridge University Press. ISBN 0-521-30571-3.
- Peacock, A.C.S. (2014). "The Seljuk Sultanate of Rum and the Turkmen of the Byzantine frontier, 1206–1279". Al-Masāq: Journal of the Medieval Mediterranean. 26 (3). Taylor & Francis. doi:10.1080/09503110.2014.956476.
- Treadgold, Warren (1997). A History of the Byzantine State and Society. Stanford University Press. ISBN 978-0-8047-2630-6.
- Beihammer, Alexander (2020). Preiser-Kapeller, Johannes; Reinfandt, Lucian; Stouraitis, Yannis (eds.). "Patterns of Turkish Migration and Expansion in Byzantine Asia Minor in the 11th and 12th Centuries". Migration Histories of the Medieval Afroeurasian Transition Zone: Aspects of Mobility between Africa, Asia and Europe, 300–1500 C.E. Brill.
- Stone, Andrew F. (2004). "Manuel I Comnenus (A.D. 1143-1180)". De Imperatoribus Romanis. Archived from the original on 5 October 2003.
- Stone, Andrew F. (2005). "Gregory Antiochos on the "Crusade" of 1179". Revue des études byzantines. 63: 151–166. doi:10.3406/rebyz.2005.2309.
- Stouraitis, Yannis, ed. (2018). Brill’s Companions to the Byzantine World. A Companion to the Byzantine Culture of War, ca. 300-1204. Vol. 3. Brill. ISBN 978-90-04-35551-4.
- Vryonis, Speros (1971). The Decline of Medieval Hellenism in Asia Minor and the Process of Islamization from the Eleventh through the Fifteenth Century. University of California Press. ISBN 0-520-01597-5.
- Simpson, Alicia, ed. (2015). Byzantium, 1180–1204: The Sad Quarter of a Century?. International Symposium. Athens: National Hellenic Research Foundation, Institute of Historical Research, Section of Byzantine Research. ISBN 978-960-9538-37-4.
