= Siege of Claudiopolis =

12th century Byzantine battle

- Part of the Byzantine–Seljuq wars
Date	February–March 1179
Location	Claudiopolis, Bithynia (modern-day Bolu, Turkey) 40°43′59.99″N 31°36′0.00″E
Result	Byzantine victory

Belligerents
Byzantine Empire	Seljuk Sultanate of Rûm

Commanders and leaders
Manuel I Komnenos	Unknown

The siege of Claudiopolis was a Byzantine victory over a Seljuk army in February–March 1179, during the Byzantine–Seljuk war of 1175–1179.

== Background ==
After the Byzantine annihilation of a Seljuq Turkish army at the Battle of Hyelion and Leimocheir in 1177, the Byzantines laid waste to Turkish encampments along the Meander River. Emperor Manuel I Komnenos drove out Turkish forces encamped near Lakerion and Panasion. A Byzantine attempt to capture the town of Charax failed when the Byzantine commander, Andronikos Doukas Angelos, panicked after facing a few Turks in the night and led his entire force in a rout.

== Siege ==
In February 1179, the Turks laid siege to the town of Claudiopolis in northern Bithynia. The Byzantine garrison was prevented from sallying out. The defending forces threatened the emperor with a capitulation unless prompt help arrived, claiming to not have the strength to withstand a siege attack or starvation blockade. Manuel set out for Claudiopolis with an army a day after receiving the message. He proceeded via Nicomedia, with only his horse and armor, unburdened by imperial luxuries. The emperor slept little and rested on the ground, earning him the admiration of his men. Upon catching sight of the approaching Byzantine banners and glittering armaments, the surprised Turks turned tail and fled. Manuel did not let up, pursuing them back to their lands.

== Aftermath ==
The Byzantine success demonstrated that the frontier in Anatolia remained intact. Manuel concluded an advantageous peace with the Seljuqs by the end of 1179.
