= John Komnenos Vatatzes =

Byzantine general (c.1132–1182)

- Born: unknown, probably c. 1132
- Died: 16 May 1182; Philadelphia
- Military career
- Allegiance: Byzantine Empire
- Rank: Megas domestikos
- Commands: Commander in Chief of the Byzantine army, Governor (Doux) of Thrace, General commanding a number of field armies
- Conflicts: Byzantine–Seljuk wars; Byzantine–Seljuk war (1175–1179); Battle of Hyelion and Leimocheir; Battle of Philadelphia (1182)

John Komnenos Vatatzes (Greek: Ἰωάννης Κομνηνὸς Βατάτζης, Iōannēs Komnēnos Vatatzēs), or simply John Komnenos or John Vatatzes (the transliteration 'Batatzes' is also employed) in the sources, was a major military and political figure in the Byzantine (Eastern Roman) Empire during the reigns of Manuel I Komnenos and Alexios II Komnenos. He was born c. 1132, and died of natural causes during a rebellion he raised against Andronikos I Komnenos in 1182.

== Background and family ==
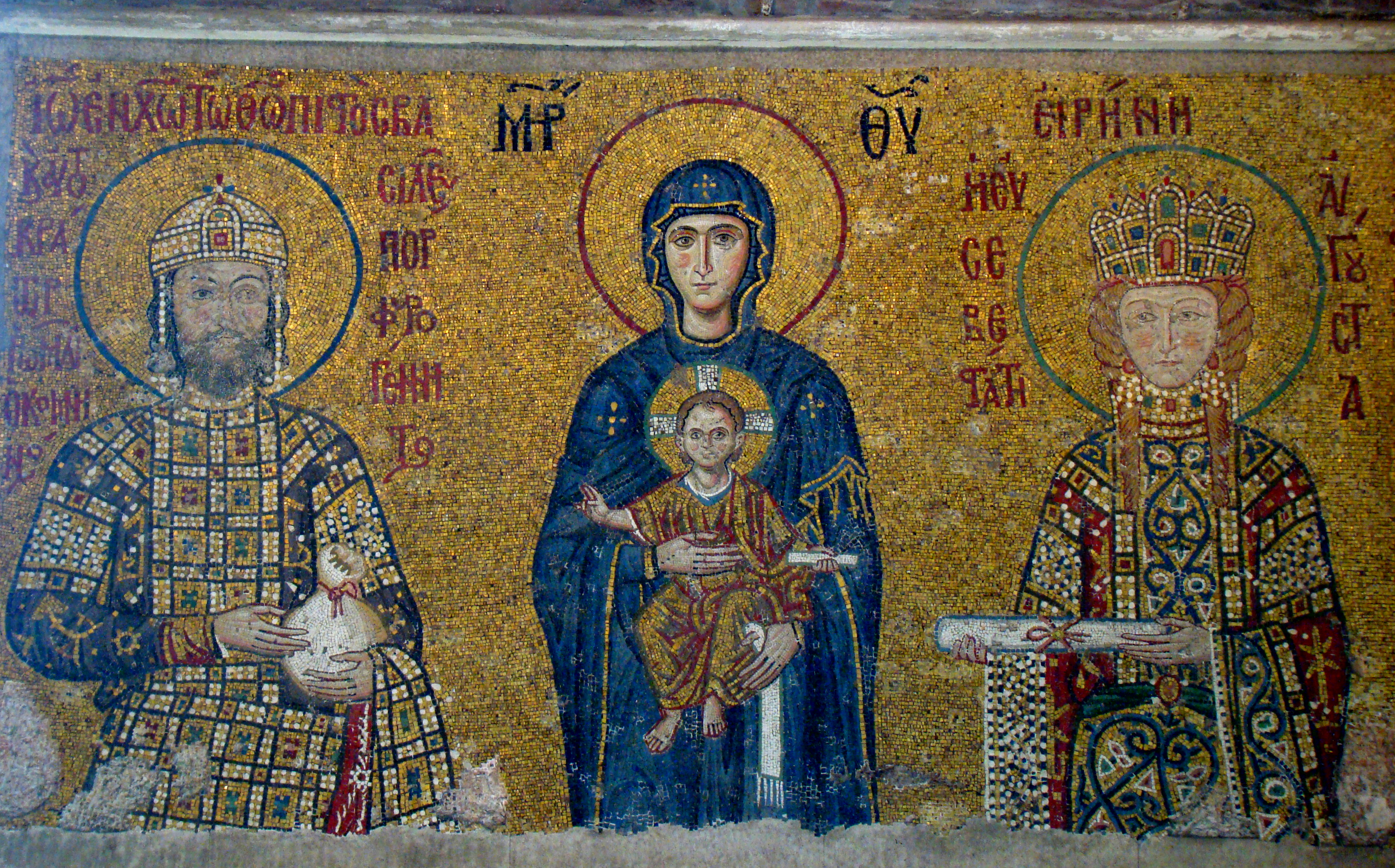
Emperor John II Komnenos and his wife Eirene, grandparents of John Komnenos Vatatzes, flanking the Virgin and Child

John Komnenos Vatatzes was the son of the sebastohypertatos Theodore Vatatzes, and the porphyrogenita princess Eudokia Komnene, daughter of the emperor John II Komnenos and his empress Eirene of Hungary. Theodore Vatatzes was one of the 'new men' raised to prominence by John II; the Vatatzes family were not previously counted amongst the highest levels of the Byzantine aristocracy, though they had long been prominent in the region around the city of Adrianople in Thrace.

John's parents married in 1131, and he was born soon thereafter, probably ca. 1132. John had a brother, Andronikos, who was also a prominent general – he led an army against the city of Amaseia in 1176 and was killed by the Seljuq Turks; they displayed his severed head during the Battle of Myriokephalon shortly afterwards. He had another brother, named Alexios. John's wife was named Maria Doukaina and they had two sons, Alexios and Manuel. The latter was named for John's uncle, the Emperor Manuel, to whom John was very devoted—to the extent of tolerating a love affair between the emperor and his own sister Theodora.

== Military career in the reign of Manuel I ==
John Komnenos Vatatzes enters contemporary sources as a senior general in the 1170s; it is certain that he served in lesser military capacities before being appointed to high command, but no record of his activities has survived. He undoubtedly had a military apprenticeship under his father Theodore, also a prominent general, who undertook the siege of Zemun on the Hungarian frontier in 1151, and captured the city of Tarsus in Cilicia in 1158.

In 1176 Emperor Manuel Komnenos attempted to destroy the Seljuk Sultanate of Rûm, but was defeated at Myriokephalon. Following a truce which allowed the Byzantine army to retreat from Turkish territory, Manuel failed to implement all the conditions, particularly the destruction of border fortresses, demanded by the Seljuq sultan Kilij Arslan II as a prerequisite for a cessation of hostilities. The fortress of Soublaion was razed, but the more important fortification of Dorylaion was not. The sultan reacted by dispatching a substantial Seljuq cavalry army, numbering about 24,000 men, to ravage Byzantine territory in the Meander Valley in western Anatolia. John Komnenos Vatatzes was entrusted with command of a Byzantine army and set out from Constantinople with instructions to intercept the Seljuq raiders. Vatatzes was given Constantine Doukas and Michael Aspietes as lieutenants, and was able to reinforce his army through local recruitment as it moved through Byzantine territory.

Vatatzes intercepted the Seljuq army as it was returning to Turkish territory loaded with plunder from sacked Byzantine cities. He deployed his army to create a classic ambush, which was sprung when the Turks were in the process of crossing the Meander River, near the settlements of Hyelion and Leimocheir. The Seljuq army was almost helpless to defend itself and was destroyed; the Byzantine historian Niketas Choniates stated that only a few out of many thousands escaped. The Seljuq commander, who held the title 'Atabeg', was killed as he attempted to fight his way out of the trap. The battle was a significant victory for the Byzantines and it underlined how limited the immediate effects of the Byzantine defeat at Myriokephalon were on the empire's hold over its Anatolian possessions. The Byzantine victory was followed up by punitive expeditions against the Turcoman nomads settled around the upper Meander Valley.

== Alexios II and rebellion ==
When Vatatzes is again mentioned in the sources, in 1182, he is holding very high office: he was both megas domestikos, the commander in chief of the Byzantine army, and governor of the important Theme (province) of Thrace. The city of Adrianople was both the seat of the government of Thrace and the centre of the landholdings of the Vatatzes family, and John is recorded as building and endowing fine almshouses and hospitals there.

Following the death of Emperor Manuel I in 1180 the succession fell to his son Alexios II Komnenos. As Alexios was a child, power devolved on his mother, the empress Maria of Antioch. Her rule proved unpopular, especially with the aristocracy who resented her Latin (Western) origins. When Manuel's cousin Andronikos Komnenos (Andronikos I) made a bid for power in early 1182 he wrote to John Vatatzes in an attempt to suborn him. Vatatzes recognised Andronikos as a potential tyrant and wrote back in insulting terms. Vatazes' cousin Andronikos Kontostephanos the commander of the navy, however, was deceived and played a key role in allowing Andronikos' forces to enter Constantinople. Once in power, Andronikos Komnenos proved that he had indeed a tyrannical nature and a vehement desire to break the power and influence of the Byzantine aristocratic families.

At the time, Vatatzes is recorded as residing near Philadelphia in western Anatolia; presumably he had been dismissed from his offices. As a member of the imperial family and a respected and successful general he had no difficulties in raising a substantial army when he openly rebelled against the new regime. Vatatzes upbraided Andronikos as a "demonic adversary" who was "intent on exterminating the imperial family." The second accusation, at least, was an accurate assessment.

Andronikos I sent the general Andronikos Lampardas (or Lapardas) against Vatatzes with a large force. Vatatzes, who had become seriously ill, met Lampardas' army near Philadelphia. He first instructed his sons Manuel and Alexios in how to array the army, then had himself carried to a hill where he could observe the battle from a litter. Vatatzes' forces were victorious and Lampardas' broken troops were pursued for some distance. However, a few days later, on 16 May 1182, Vatatzes died. Without his leadership the rebellion quickly broke apart, and Vatatzes' sons fled to the protection of the Seljuq sultan. When attempting to get to Sicily by sea they were wrecked on the coast of Crete and taken prisoner. They were then blinded on the orders of Andronikos I. Andronikos considered the death of Vatatzes as divine providence, and it emboldened him to declare himself co-emperor alongside Alexios.

== Legacy ==
John Komnenos Vatatzes is one of the few figures whose character is described with unalloyed admiration in the works of the Byzantine historian Niketas Choniates.
