= Michael Aspietes =

Michael Aspietes (Greek: Μιχαήλ Ἀσπιέτης, fl. 1167–1176) was a distinguished Byzantine general serving under Emperor Manuel I Komnenos.

A member of the Aspietes family, of noble Armenian origin, Michael Aspietes is most likely the Aspietes whom John Kinnamos records as having distinguished himself in the wars against the Hungarians in 1167. He is next recorded by Niketas Choniates as being active in 1176, in the aftermath of the Byzantine defeat at the Battle of Myriokephalon, when he and John Komnenos Vatatzes campaigned against the Seljuk Turks raiding the Maeander River valley. At the Battle of Hyelion and Leimocheir the Seljuk army was destroyed in an ambush. During the battle a Turk wounded Aspietes' horse and the panicked animal reared up on its hind legs. The general was thrown into the Maeander River, where he drowned.

== Sources ==
- Choniates, Nicetas (1984). O City of Byzantium, Annals of Niketas Choniatēs. Translated by Harry J. Magoulias. Detroit: Wayne State University Press. ISBN 0-8143-1764-2.
- Kazhdan, Alexander (1991). "Aspietes". In Kazhdan, Alexander (ed.). The Oxford Dictionary of Byzantium. Oxford and New York: Oxford University Press. pp. 211–212. ISBN 0-19-504652-8.
- Savvides, Alexis G. K. (1991). "Notes on the Armeno-Byzantine family of Aspietes, late 11th-early 13th centuries". Byzantinoslavica. 52. Prague: 70–79.
