= Charax (Bithynia) =

Roman and Byzantine town in Bithynia

Coordinates: 40°47′20″N 29°36′49″E

Charax in Bithynia (Ancient Greek: Χάραξ της Βιθυνίας or Χάρακας της Βιθυνίας) was a Roman and Byzantine port town of ancient Bithynia, in what is now Turkey. It was on the north side of the Sinus Astacenus on the road between the erstwhile Eastern Roman and Byzantine capital Nicomedia and Libyssa. Stephanus of Byzantium calls it a place of great trade.

Its site is located near Hereke, in Asiatic Turkey.
