= Battle of Hyelion and Leimocheir =

Battle between the Byzantines and Seljuks of Rum

- Part of the Byzantine–Seljuq wars
Date	1177
Location	Hyelion, Meander Valley, Asia Minor
Result	Byzantine victory

Belligerents
Byzantine Empire	Seljuk Sultanate of Rûm

Commanders and leaders
John Komnenos Vatatzes; Michael Aspietes †; Constantine Doukas	Atapakos †

Strength
Unknown	20,000–24,000

The Battle of Hyelion and Leimocheir was a military engagement fought during the Byzantine–Seljuk war of 1175–1179. It saw the almost complete destruction by the Byzantines of a large Seljuk army. The Seljuks had been raiding Byzantine territory in the Maeander Valley in Anatolia, and had sacked a number of cities. The Byzantine force ambushed the Turks at a river crossing.

== Background ==
Following Emperor Manuel Komnenos' defeat at the Battle of Myriokephalon (1176) the Byzantines failed to implement all the conditions, particularly the destruction of border fortresses, demanded by the Seljuq sultan Kilij Arslan II as a prerequisite for a cessation of hostilities. A substantial Seljuq cavalry army, including Turcoman nomad auxiliaries, was dispatched into Byzantine territory, in the Meander Valley in western Anatolia, on a retaliatory raid. A Byzantine army under the general John Komnenos Vatatzes, the emperor's nephew, set out from Constantinople with instructions to intercept the Seljuq raiders. Vatatzes was given two other generals as his subordinates, Constantine Doukas and Michael Aspietes, and was able to pick up reinforcements as his army moved through Byzantine territory.

== Battle ==
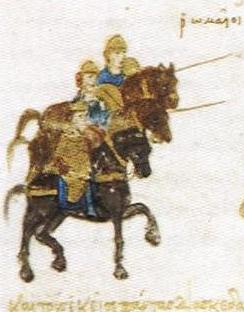
Byzantine cavalry from the Skylitzes manuscript.

The date of the battle is unknown, it has generally been ascribed to the year 1177 on the basis of its position within the narrative of Niketas Choniates.

The Turks, who had orders to ravage the Meander Valley as far as the sea-shore, sacked the Byzantine settlements of Tralles, Antioch, Louma and Pantacheir. As a result of these successes, they were loaded with plunder, including, rather poetically, water from the sea, an oar and shore sand. These burdens would have drastically slowed their progress and lessened their tactical mobility. The Seljuq army was returning towards Turkish territory when it approached a "choke point" in its journey where the great eastern highway crossed the Meander River by way of a bridge (probably ruined or semi-derelict), near the villages, or forts, of Hyelion and Leimocheir. The Byzantines had concealed themselves and were divided into two corps, separated by the river. They caught the Seljuq army in an ambush when it had partially crossed over the river, destroying it as a fighting force.

The Byzantine light troops played a prominent role in the battle; posted on high ground they are described as raining missiles down onto the near helpless Seljuqs. Many of the Seljuq soldiers tumbled into the river and were drowned. The Seljuq commander, known as "Atapakos" in Greek sources—evidently a bearer of the title of Atabeg—tried to help his forces cross the river by rallying the most heavily armed of his cavalry and attacking the Byzantines. This attack having failed, he tried to save himself by swimming across the river with his horse. When he reached the opposite shore, however, he was killed by an Alan soldier of the Byzantine force. Following the death of their commander the Seljuq troops fled in disorder, with a great number of them being drowned in the river; Choniates stating that only a few out of many thousands were able to save themselves. On the Byzantine side, the general Michael Aspietes fell; he was drowned in the Meander when thrown by his wounded horse.

== Aftermath ==
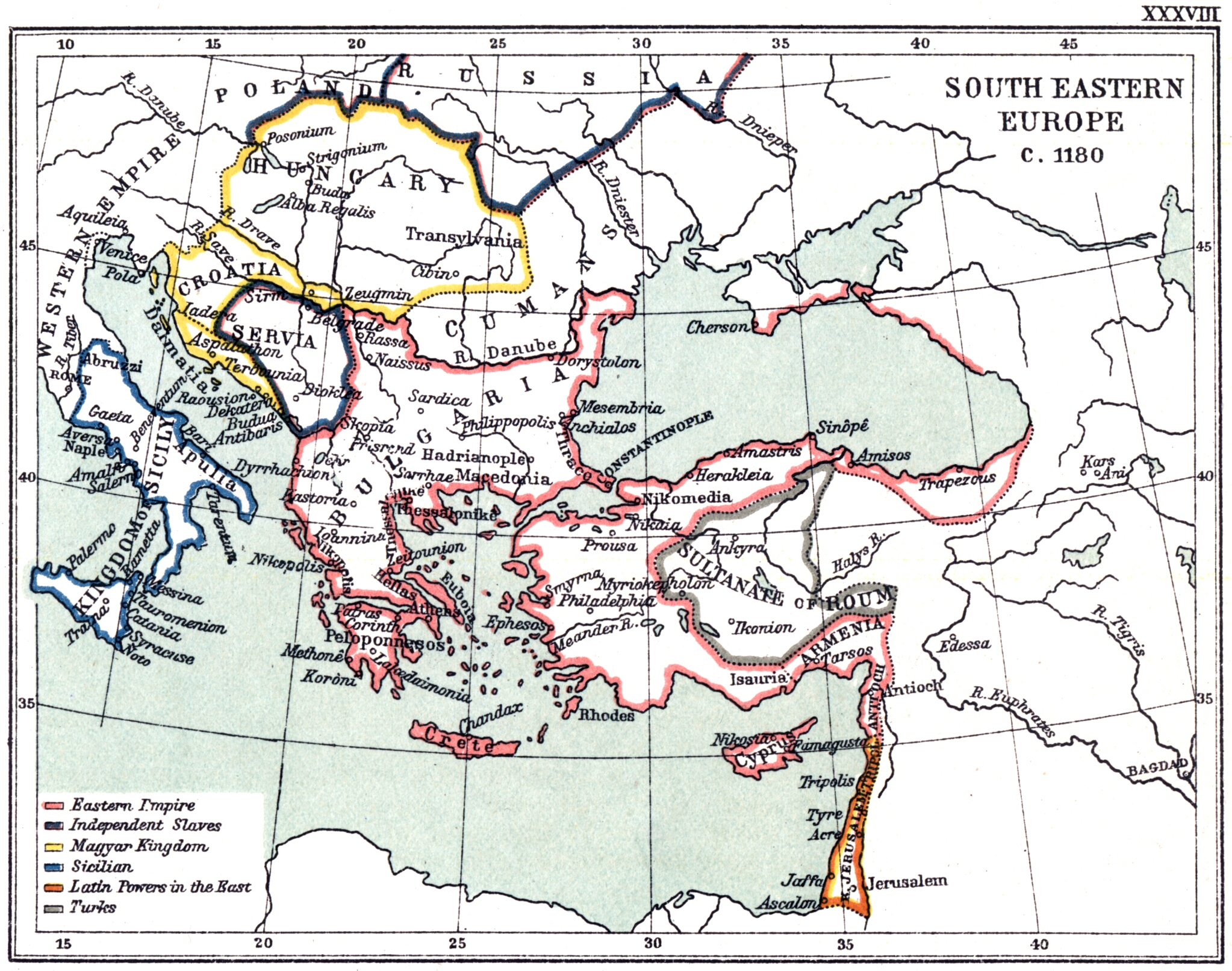
A map of the Byzantine Empire showing the location of the Meander River.

The battle was a significant Byzantine victory and demonstrated that their recent defeat at Myriokephalon had only a limited immediate effect on the empire's hold over its Anatolian possessions. The victory was followed up by punitive expeditions against the Turcoman nomads settled around the upper Meander Valley.

The Byzantine strategy at this battle, ambushing a raiding army on its return journey when it would be slowed by plunder and captives, is exactly what had been prescribed in much earlier Byzantine military treatises, such as the Tactica of Leo VI (886–912). This points to a retention by Byzantine commanders of knowledge of the successful military strategies of the past.

The emperor Manuel died in 1180; his son and successor Alexios II Komnenos was a minor, and the empire was governed by a divided regency. Without the strong presence of Manuel, the military advantage in Anatolia reverted to the Seljuqs. Sultan Kilij Arslan invaded the empire in 1182, when Byzantium was distracted by the coup d'état of Alexios's cousin Andronikos Komnenos, and following the Siege of Cotyaeum captured the towns of Sozopolis and Cotyaeum.

== See also ==
- Komnenian army

== Sources ==
=== Primary ===
- Choniates, Niketas; Magoulias, Harry J. (1984). O City of Byzantium: Annals of Niketas Choniates. Detroit, Michigan: Wayne State University Press. ISBN 0-8143-1764-2.

=== Secondary ===
- Angold, Michael (1984). The Byzantine Empire, 1025–1204: A Political History (First ed.). London and New York: Longman. ISBN 0-582-49060-X.
- Birkenmeier, John W. (2002). The Development of the Komnenian Army: 1081–1180. Leiden, The Netherlands: Brill Academic Publishers. ISBN 90-04-11710-5.
- Finlay, George; Tozer, Henry Fanshawe (1877). A History of Greece from its Conquest by the Romans to the Present Time B.C. 146 to A.D. 1864: The Byzantine and Greek Empires. Part 2, A.D. 1057–1453. Vol. III. Oxford, United Kingdom: Clarendon Press.
- Haldon, John (2001), The Byzantine Wars, Stroud: Tempus, ISBN 0-7524-1777-0
- Kafesoğlu, I. (1988) A history of the Seljuks: İbrahim Kafesoğlu's interpretation and the resulting controversy Southern Illinois University Press ISBN 9780809314140
- Magdalino, Paul (1993). The Empire of Manuel I Komnenos, 1143–1180. Cambridge, United Kingdom: Cambridge University Press. ISBN 0-521-52653-1.
- Ramsay, William Mitchell (July–December 1887). "Antiquities of Southern Phrygia and the Border Lands". The American Journal of Archaeology. 3 (3–4). Baltimore, Maryland: Archaeological Institute of America: 344–368.
