= Andronikos Lapardas =

Andronikos Lapardas or Andronicus Lampardas (Greek: Ἀνδρόνικος Λαπαρδάς) was a Byzantine general during the late Komnenian period.

He is first attested as a participant of a synod on 2 March 1166, held at the imperial palace and presided over by Emperor Manuel I Komnenos (r. 1143–1180) in person. He is listed 15th among the imperial relatives, bearing the high title of sebastos, and with the court offices of oikeios vestiarites and chartoularios. In July 1167, he led the right division of the Byzantine army at the Battle of Sirmium, a decisive victory over the Hungarian Kingdom that ensured Byzantine control of the western Balkans. In 1176, he participated in the disastrous campaign against the Sultanate of Rum that ended with the Battle of Myriokephalon.

In 1182, King Béla III of Hungary attacked the Byzantine fortresses of Belgrade and Braničevo. The war continued in 1183, when the Serbs joined forces with the Hungarians. The Byzantine border armies were under the command of two experienced commanders: Alexios Branas and Andronikos Lapardas. The news that Andronikos I Komnenos had taken power in Constantinople divided the two commanders, so they retreated towards Trajan's Gate.

Once Andronikos I had established himself, he sent Andronikos Lapardas with a large force against John Komnenos Vatatzes, a nephew of the late Manuel I Komnenos, who had raised a revolt in western Anatolia. Vatatzes, who had become seriously ill, met Lapardas' army near Philadelphia. Vatatzes' forces were victorious and Lapardas' broken troops were pursued for some distance. However, a few days later, on 16 May 1182, Vatatzes died. Without his leadership the rebellion quickly broke apart.

Lapardas quickly fell out of favour with Andronikos I, who had him imprisoned, blinded, and confined to the Pantepoptes Monastery in Constantinople. He died there shortly after.

From a poem of Theodore Balsamon, it is known that Lapardas married a Theodora Komnene. Earlier scholars identified her as Manuel's sister, who is known to have married Manuel Anemas. Based on Lapardas' position among the imperial relatives in 1166, the scholar Lucien Stiernon proposed an identification of Lapardas' wife as a granddaughter of that Theodora and Manuel Anemas. The couple probably did not have any children.

== Bibliography ==
- Brand, Charles M., ed. (1976). Deeds of John and Manuel Comnenus, by John Kinnamos. New York: Columbia University Press. ISBN 0-231-04080-6.
- Choniates, Nicetas (1984). O City of Byzantium, Annals of Niketas Choniatēs. Translated by Harry J. Magoulias. Detroit: Wayne State University Press. ISBN 0-8143-1764-2.
- Stiernon, Lucien (1966). "Notes de titulature et de prosopographie byzantines: Théodore Comnène et Andronic Lapardas, sébastes". Revue des études byzantines (in French). 24: 89–96. doi:10.3406/rebyz.1966.1362. ISSN 0771-3347.
