= Byzantine–Seljuk War (1158–1162) =

12th-century military conflict in Asia Minor

- Part of the Byzantine-Seljuk wars
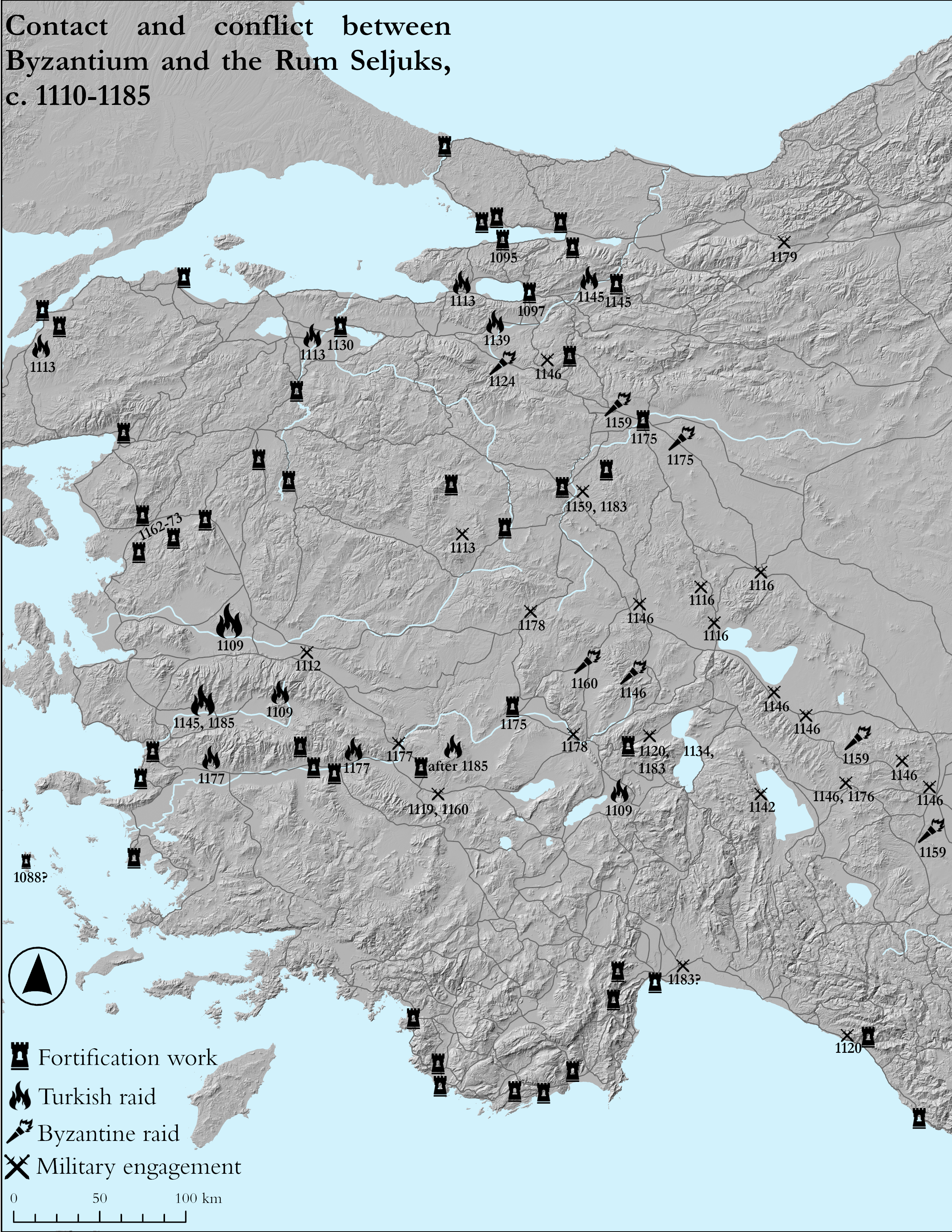
- Map depicting border conflicts between the Byzantine empire and the Sultanate of Rum, c. 1110–1185
Date	1158–1162
Location	Western and Central Asia Minor and Cilicia
Result	Byzantine victory
Territorial changes	Vassalage and submission of the Sultanate of Rum

Belligerents
Byzantine Empire Supported by: Kingdom of Jerusalem; Principality of Antioch; Principality of Cilicia; Principality of Serbia; Danishmendids; Zengids; Artuqids	Sultanate of Rum

Commanders and leaders
Manuel I Komnenos; John Kontostephanos; John Axouch; Alexios Axouch; Andronikos Kontostephanos Supporters: Yağıbasan; Nur al-Din Zengi; Kara Arslan; Najm al-Din Alpi	Kilij Arslan II

Strength
25,000–35,000	22,000–25,000

Casualties and losses
Moderate	Heavy

The Byzantine–Seljuk War of 1158–1162 was a military conflict fought between the Byzantine Empire under Emperor Manuel I Komnenos, and the Sultanate of Rum under Sultan Kilij Arslan II. The war initially grew out of a grand eastern expedition launched by Manuel I in 1158, with the aim to reassert imperial authority over Syria. After forcing the Armenian Kingdom of Cilicia and the Crusader state of Antioch into diplomatic submission, the returning Byzantine army was harassed by Seljuk forces, which caused them to retaliate.

== Background ==
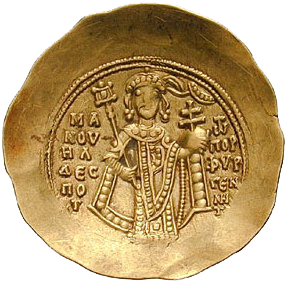
Golden hyperpyron depicting Emperor Manuel I Komnenos dressed in royal regalia

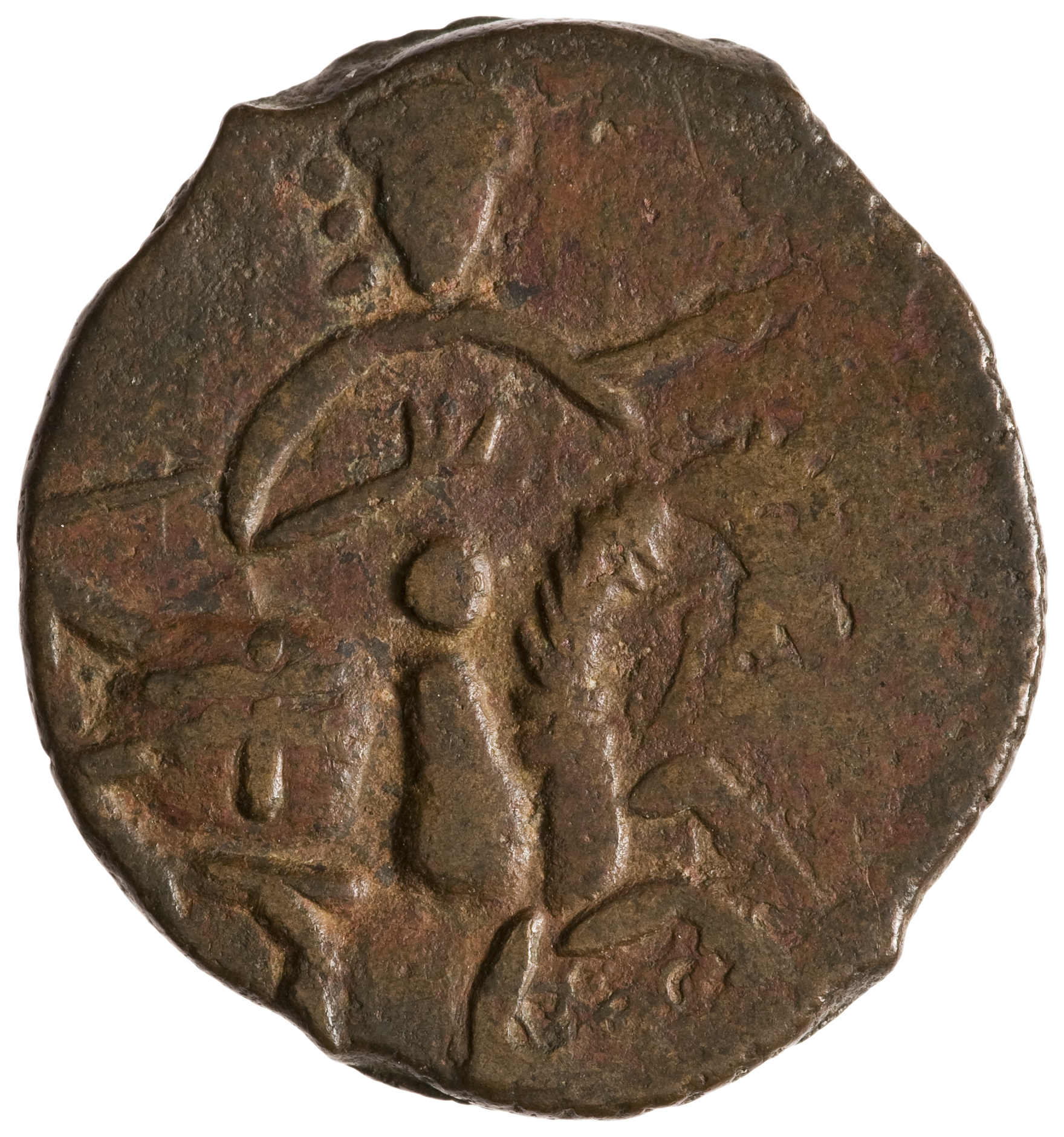
Copper fal depicting Sultan Kilij Arslan II on horseback

In the winter of 1158, Emperor Manuel marched a large army into Southern Anatolia, in order to assert authority over Cilicia and the Crusader states. During the march, the Byzantines encountered and decisively defeated Seljuk raiders who had been actively pillaging the frontier. As the imperial army was stationed in Antioch, Manuel received news of a conspiracy back in Constantinople, prompting him to abruptly depart from the city. While en route, he requested permission from Kilij Arslan to march the imperial army along the fastest overland route, which cut directly through Seljuk territory. However, the sultan declined his request. Faced with intense political pressure from a domestic crisis back home, Manuel forced the march anyways. The unauthorized entry ignited immediate hostilities, and in early 1159, as the imperial column reached the frontier fortress of Kotyaion, Seljuk forces harassed the rear-guard of Manuel's army, before it returned to Byzantine territory.

== Byzantine-Seljuk war ==
While the immediate threat to his throne in the capital was neutralized upon his return, the harassment during his march through the territory of Rum convinced Manuel that a more active strategy against the Seljuks was necessary. The emperor personally led raiding operations against the Seljuks in the winter of 1159–1160, during which the Byzantines advanced to the environs of Dorylaeum, where they scored a number of minor successes against the Turkoman nomads, and seized large quantities of the animals on which they depended. John Kinnamos emphasized the martial feats performed by Manuel in person during these victories. After returning to Nicomedia for a brief rest, the emperor then led a smaller raid into Seljuk territory with a retinue of as few as 60 horsemen (likely near the region of Akroinon) before the end of winter. However, these successes were insufficient to check the threat of Seljuk border incursions, as a counter invasion by Turkoman raiders from Caria managed to take and sack Laodikeia and the fortress of Phileta, near Attaleia. This prompted Manuel to prepare a grand strategy with the objective to secure his eastern frontier and force the Sultanate of Rum into complete submission.

The emperor consequently embarked on a series of systematic campaigns to neutralize the Seljuk military capabilities through overwhelming logistical deployment and strategic encirclement. After 1159, the Byzantine operational strategy relied on multi-pronged offenses and territorial consolidation. Imperial divisions were deployed from the northern Theme of Paphlagonia and the western frontier, and launched synchronized assaults on Seljuk border positions. Rather than seeking a single decisive engagement, Manuel focused on fortress warfare. The Byzantine army recaptured lost frontier outposts and constructed new fortifications, effectively restricting the mobility of nomadic Seljuk raiding parties. Additional attacks against the Seljuks by Byzantine detachments were launched from the Opsikion and Thracesian themes. In response, Kilij Arslan utilized scorched earth tactics, destroying crops and poisoning water sources. The Byzantines mitigated this strategy by employing extensive baggage trains and secure logistical corridors, ensuring the army remained provisioned during deep incursions into the Anatolian interior.

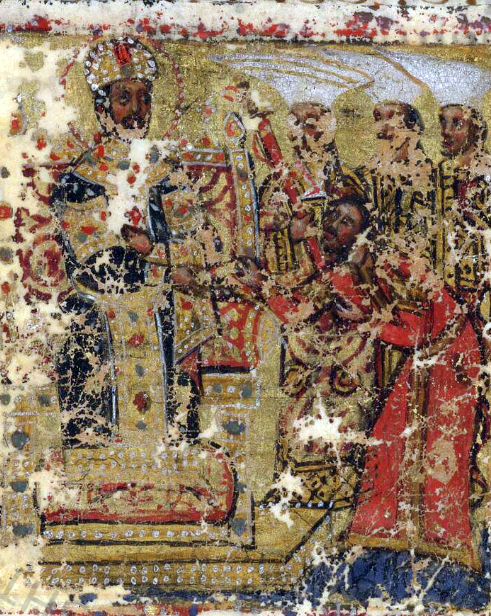
Miniature of Emperor Manuel I Komnenos c. 1179, Vatican Library

In summer 1160, Manuel dispatched a Byzantine army to Cilicia in order to raid Seljuk territory in the vicinity of the Seljuk capital of Iconium, intending to pressure the Sultanate of Rum with military incursions from both the west and south. This army was led by John Kontostephanos and was augmented by auxiliary contingents from the Cilician Armenians and small numbers of allied Latin troops dispatched by Raynald of Châtillon and Baldwin III of Jerusalem (to whom Kontostephanos had travelled as an envoy in spring 1160). The sequence of Kontostephanos' campaign is not described by the John Kinnamos, the primary historian detailing it. Kontostephanos likely took the route over the Taurus Mountains following the Calycadnus river into the Anatolian interior, but it is also possible that he marched his men over the Cilician Gates through the territory of Yağıbasan, a rebellious vassal of Kilij Arslan who had previously made diplomatic contact with emperor Manuel. Soon after crossing into the Anatolian plateau, Kontostephanos unexpectedly encountered a large Seljuk army. According to Kinnamos, the Seljuk army numbered 22,000 and likely heavily outnumbered the Byzantines. However, Kontostephanos managed to reposition his men onto elevated terrain which negated the numerical superiority of the Seljuks. The forces of Rum engaged the Byzantines, but in the ensuing battle Kontostephanos achieved a decisive victory. Following the Seljuk defeat, Kontostephanos was able to raid the territory surrounding Iconium for a few weeks, before returning to Byzantine territory. After the campaign, the Armenian and Latin contingents returned to Cilicia and the Levant, while Kontostephanos and his Byzantine soldiers travelled back to Constantinople.

By 1161, Manuel I supplemented his military operations with regional diplomacy to isolate the Sultanate of Rum. The Byzantine court secured alliances with neighboring Muslim powers who opposed Kilij Arslan II, including the rival Danishmends of Yağıbasan, the Artuqids and the Zengids, successfully maintaining the military pressure against the Seljuks. In late 1161, Manuel mobilized the core imperial field army for a direct offensive targeting the Seljuk capital of Iconium. Faced with internal rebellions, a multi-front coalition, the heavy defeat recently suffered against Kontostephanos and the approach of the main Byzantine army, Kilij Arslan determined that his forces could not risk a pitched battle. Before the imperial forces could invest the defences of Iconium, the sultan dispatched envoys to offer an unconditional submission. Manuel halted the military advance outside the capital and accepted the Seljuk submission, concluding the active campaigns.

== Aftermath ==
=== Visit of Kilij Arslan to Constantinople ===
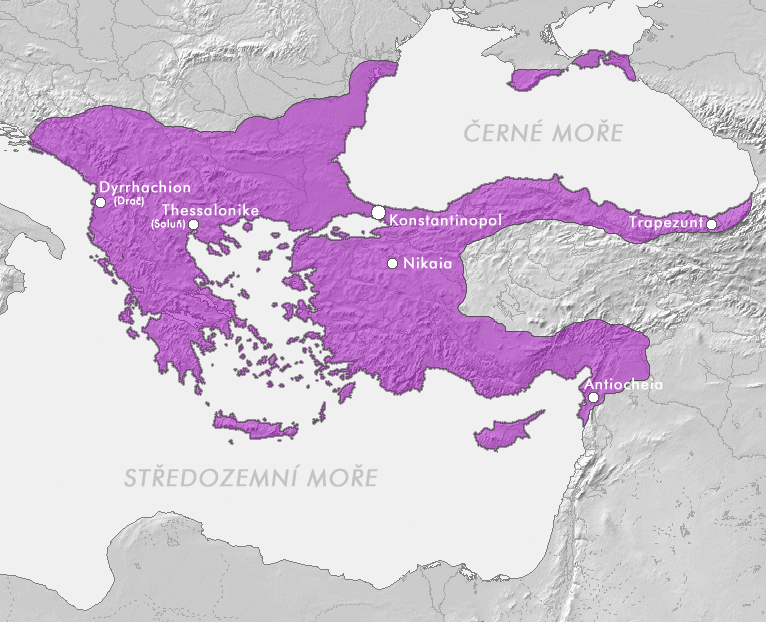
The Byzantine Empire c. 1176

In order to seal the agreement, Kilij Arslan undertook a highly publicized ceremonial visit to Constantinople either sometime before December 1161, or in spring 1162. In the Byzantine capital, the sultan was welcomed with ceremonies and splendour meant to showcase Byzantine power, as he was seated on a low stool, while Manuel was dressed in porphyra robes and sat upon a golden throne decorated with rubies, sapphires and pearls. In the Boukoleon Palace, the emperor received the sultan with banquets and horseraces, set alight some boats and skiffs with Greek fire, and then impressed him with the spectacles of the Hippodrome.

=== Treaty of Constantinople ===
The peace agreement was favourable to the Byzantines, as Rum became subordinate to Byzantium and Kilij Arslan was ritually adopted as a son by Manuel. According to the historian John Kinnamos:

After he had passed sufficient time in Byzantion and had confirmed his prior agreements with additional oaths, he returned to his own land. The terms of the agreement went thus: throughout his life to be hostile to those who cherished enmity against the emperor, but to be friendly to those who, on the contrary, were settled in his favor. Of the cities which he had won, he would give the greater and more notable to the emperor. It was not allowed for him to make peace with any of the enemy unless the emperor directed. He would fight as ally with the Romans on request, and come with his entire force whether the conflict was an eastern or a western one. Nor would he allow those who lay beneath his authority, but who are clever at living by thefts and customarily are called Turkomans, to do any harm whatsoever to the Romans’ land, unpunished. He agreed to these things, and those of the grandees who attended him [pledged] that, should he be unmindful of them, with all their strength they would hinder the attempt.

While the treaty initiated a period of relative stability on the eastern frontier that lasted for over a decade, the peace proved temporary. As Manuel focused on western affairs, most notably the war with Hungary that erupted soon after the submission of the Seljuks, Kilij Arslan systematically eliminated his regional rivals, strengthening the sultanate. The geopolitical truce ultimately collapsed and led to another war between the two states.

== Bibliography ==
=== Primary Sources ===
- Choniates, Nicetas (1984). O City of Byzantium, Annals of Niketas Choniatēs. Translated by Harry J. Magoulias. Detroit: Wayne State University Press. ISBN 0-8143-1764-2.
- Kinnamos, John (1976). Deeds of John and Manuel Comnenus. Translated by Brand, Charles M. New York: Columbia University Press. ISBN 0-231-04080-6.
- Komnene, Anna (1969) [c. 1148]. The Alexiad of Anna Comnena. Translated by Sewter, E. R. A. Penguin Classics. ISBN 9780141904542.
- Robert of Clari (1939) [1208]. Stone, Edward N. (ed.). Robert of Clari's account of the Fourth Crusade (republication of Three Old French Chronicles of the Crusades, ed. Edward N. Stone ed.). Archived from the original on 7 February 2005.
- William of Tyre (1943), Historia Rerum in Partibus Transmarinis Gestarum [A History of Deeds Done Beyond the Sea], translated by E. A. Babock and A. C. Krey, Columbia University Press, original text

=== Secondary Sources ===
- Angold, Michael (2008). Shepard, Jonathan (ed.). The Cambridge History of the Byzantine Empire, c. 500–1492. Cambridge University Press.
- Kaldellis, Anthony (2023). The New Roman Empire: A History of Byzantium. New York: Oxford University Press. ISBN 978-0197549322.
- Magdalino, Paul (2011). "Court and Capital in Byzantium". In Duindam, Jeroen; Artan, Tülay; Kunt, Metin (eds.). Royal Courts in Dynastic States and Empires: A Global Perspective. Vol. 1. Brill.
- Magdalino, Paul (2002) [1993]. The Empire of Manuel I Komnenos, 1143–1180. Cambridge: Cambridge University Press. ISBN 0-521-52653-1.
- McMahon, Lucas (2025). "Manuel I Komnenos' policy towards the sultanate of Rum and John Kontostephanos' embassies to Jerusalem, 1159–61". Crusades. 24 (1): 47–66. doi:10.1080/14765276.2024.2405810.
- Müller, Samuel Pablo (2022). Latins in Roman (Byzantine) Histories: Ambivalent Representations in the Long Twelfth Century. BRILL. ISBN 978-90-04-49970-6.
- Treadgold, Warren (1997). A History of the Byzantine State and Society. Stanford University Press. ISBN 978-0-8047-2630-6.
- McMahon, Lucas (2026). "Avoiding Konya: How to go to the Holy Land in the Twelfth Century". Journal of Medieval History. 52 (1): 1–36. doi:10.1080/03044181.2025.2568481.
