= Constantine Makrodoukas =

Constantine Doukas (Greek: Κωνσταντίνος Δούκας; died 30 May 1185), called Makrodoukas (Μακροδούκας, "Tall Doukas", probably a sobriquet) by Niketas Choniates, was a Byzantine nobleman.

== Life ==
Although a distinguished figure in the late Komnenian period, it is impossible to establish his family origin or his ties to the 11th-century Doukas dynasty. He is first attested in documents dating to 1166, where he already bears the high court rank of pansebastos sebastos and is related to the ruling dynasty by marriage with a daughter of the sebastokrator Isaac Komnenos and niece of the emperor Manuel I Komnenos (r. 1143–1180). Makrodoukas next appears in 1170 and 1176, when he accompanied Emperor Manuel I in his campaigns against the Seljuk Turks.

Under Andronikos I Komnenos (r. 1183–1185), Makrodoukas initially enjoyed the emperor's favour, and rose to the rank of panhypersebastos. However, after the rebellion of Makrodoukas' nephew Isaac Komnenos, who declared himself emperor in Cyprus, he was arrested along with other relatives of the rebel, accused of treason and condemned on 30 May to death by stoning. After surviving the stoning, he was dragged to Mangana, where he was dismembered.

== Family ==
Constantine Makrodoukas married Anna Komnene, daughter of Isaac Komnenos by 1166. They had at least one daughter, Zoe Doukaina, who married John Doukas.

== Sources ==
- Polemis, Demetrios I. (1968). The Doukai: A Contribution to Byzantine Prosopography. London: The Athlone Press. OCLC 299868377.
- Stiernon, Lucien (1965). "Notes de titulature et de prosopographie byzantines: Sébaste et gambros". Revue des études byzantines. 23: 222–243. doi:10.3406/rebyz.1965.1349.
