= Panasion =

Town of ancient Phrygia

Coordinates: 38°45′57″N 29°45′12″E

Panasion was a town of ancient Phrygia, inhabited in Roman and Byzantine times.

Its site is located near Banaz in Asiatic Turkey.
