= Battle of Beroia =

Battle between Pecheneg and Byzantine armies (1122)

- Part of the Byzantine–Pecheneg Wars
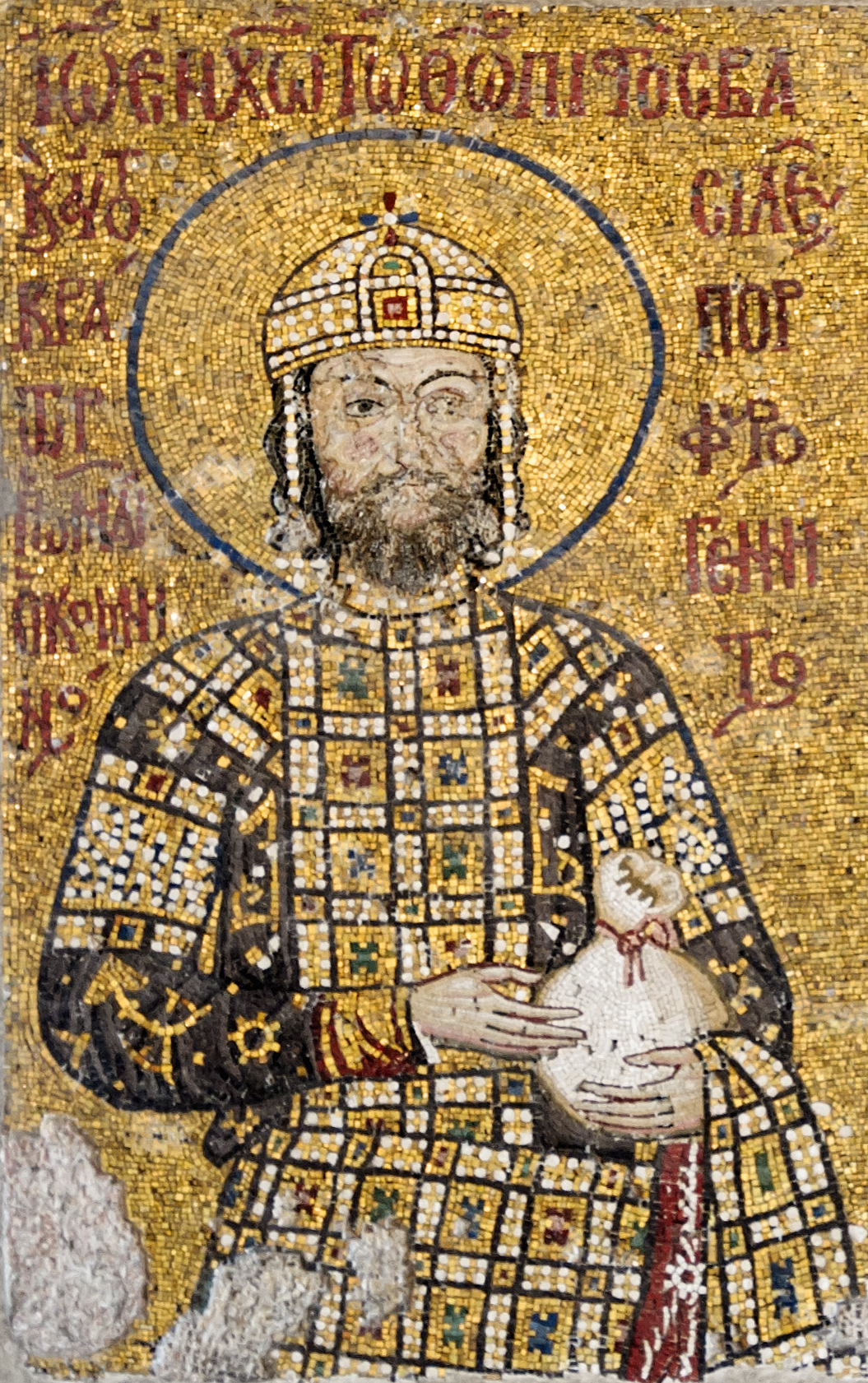
- Emperor John II Komnenos, commander of the Byzantine forces in the battle.
Date	1122
Location	Beroia (today Stara Zagora), Bulgaria 42°26′N 25°39′E
Result	Byzantine victory

Belligerents
Byzantine Empire	Pechenegs

Commanders and leaders
John II Komnenos; John Axouch (WIA)	Unknown

The Battle of Beroia (modern Stara Zagora) was fought in 1122 between the Pechenegs and the Byzantine Empire under Emperor John II Komnenos (r. 1118–1143) in what is now Bulgaria. The Byzantine army won the battle, resulting in the disappearance of the Pechenegs as a distinct, independent people.

== Background ==
In 1091, the Pechenegs invaded the Byzantine Empire and were crushingly defeated by John II's father Alexios I Komnenos (r. 1081–1118) at the Battle of Levounion. This defeat had meant the elimination of the Pechenegs who had taken part in the expedition as an independent force, as the male survivors were enrolled in the Byzantine army; however, some Pecheneg groups had not been involved in the invasion. Attacked in 1094 by the Cumans, many of the remaining Pechenegs were slain or absorbed. Nevertheless, some bands continued to exercise autonomy.

In 1122, Pechenegs from the Pontic steppes invaded the Byzantine Empire by crossing the Danube frontier into Byzantine territory. According to Michael Angold, it is possible that their invasion took place with the connivance of Vladimir Monomakh (r. 1113–1125), the ruler of Kiev, given that the Pechenegs had once been his auxiliaries. It is recorded that the remnants of the Oghuz and the Pechenegs had been expelled from Russia in 1121. The invasion posed a serious threat to Byzantine control over the northern Balkans. Emperor John II Komnenos of Byzantium, determined to meet the invaders in the field and drive them back, transferred his field army from Asia Minor (where it had been engaged against the Seljuk Turks) to Europe, and prepared to march north.

== Battle ==
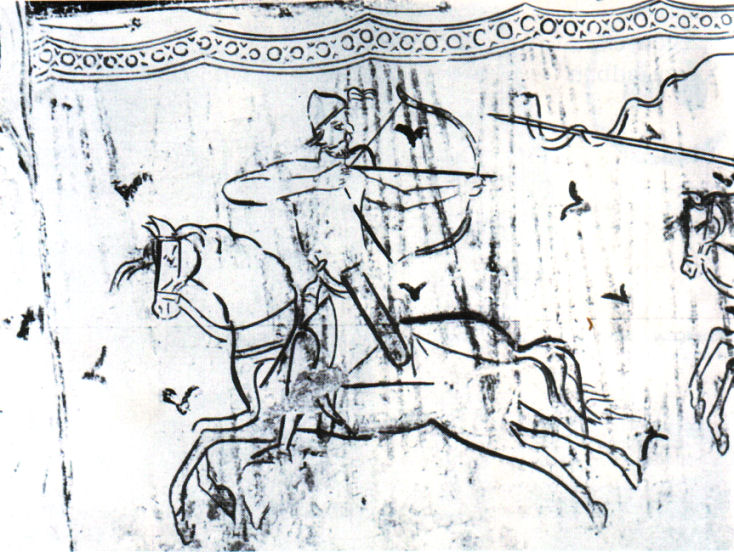
Horse-archer in action. North Italian illustration, 10th century.

The Byzantine emperor gathered his forces near Constantinople and set out to meet the Pecheneg army as soon as possible. Meanwhile, the Pechenegs had crossed the Haemus Mountains (Balkan Mountains) and encamped near the city of Beroia in Thrace. The emperor at first offered the Pecheneg chiefs presents, offering to grant them a treaty that was favourable to their interests. The Pechenegs were successfully duped by this deception and were therefore taken by surprise when the Byzantines suddenly launched a major attack on their defensive wagon fort, or laager. The Pechenegs fought as waves of horse archers, firing arrows continuously. They relied on their laager as a rallying point, depot for arrow resupply, and a point of last defence. The battle was hard fought, and John was wounded in the leg by an arrow. However, the Byzantines forced the Pechenegs back and penned them in their laager. This defence proved effective, and it was not until John led the Varangian Guard, the elite heavy infantry force of the Byzantine emperors, against the wagons that their protection was breached. The Varangians, armed with their distinctive Danish axes, hacked their way through the Pecheneg wagon fort, collapsing the Pecheneg position and causing a general rout in their camp. The Byzantine victory was complete, and the Pecheneg survivors were taken captive and enlisted into the Byzantine army.

== Aftermath ==
The Byzantine victory effectively destroyed the Pechenegs as an independent force. For some time, significant communities of Pechenegs remained in Hungary, but eventually the Pechenegs ceased to be a distinct people and were assimilated by neighbouring peoples such as the Bulgarians and Magyars. For the Byzantines, the victory did not immediately lead to peace since the Hungarians attacked Braničevo, the Byzantine outpost on the Danube, in 1128. Yet, the victory over the Pechenegs, and later the Hungarians, ensured that much of the Balkan peninsula would remain Byzantine, allowing John to concentrate on extending Byzantine power and influence in Asia Minor and the Holy Land.

== See also ==
- Komnenian Byzantine army

== Bibliography ==
- Angold, Michael (1997). The Byzantine Empire, 1025–1204: A Political History (Second ed.). London and New York: Longman. ISBN 0-582-29468-1.
- Birkenmeier, John W. (2002). The Development of the Komnenian Army: 1081-1180. Boston, Massachusetts: Brill. ISBN 90-04-11710-5.
- Choniates, Niketas; Magoulias, Harry J. (trans.) (1984). O City of Byzantium: Annals of Niketas Choniates. Detroit, Michigan: Wayne State University Press. ISBN 978-0-81-431764-8.
- Cinnamus, Ioannes (1976). Deeds of John and Manuel Comnenus. New York and West Sussex: Columbia University Press. ISBN 978-0-23-104080-8.
- Curta, Florin (2006). Southeastern Europe in the Middle Ages, 500–1250. Cambridge: Cambridge University Press. ISBN 978-0-521-81539-0.
