= Siege of Laodicea (1119) =

Coordinates: 37°50′09″N 29°06′27″E

- Part of the Byzantine–Seljuq wars
Date	Spring 1119
Location	Laodicea, Phrygia
Result	Byzantine victory

Belligerents
Byzantine Empire	Seljuk Sultanate of Rûm

Commanders and leaders
John II Komnenos; John Axouch	Alp-qara

Strength
17,000–20,000	700–800

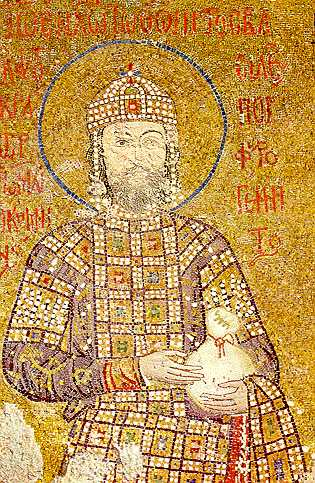
John II Komnenos

The siege of Laodicea resulted in the Byzantine capture of the Seljuq Turkish city of Laodicea in 1119.

== Background ==
Upon ascending the throne in 1118, the Byzantine emperor John II Komnenos was faced with the continued presence of Turks in Phrygia and along the Meander river. John planned to reconquer the city of Laodicea and led an army against it in the spring of 1119.

== Siege ==
When the army reached the Byzantine city of Philadelphia, John built a fortified camp and sent a force under the Grand Domestic John Axouch to attack Laodicea. The city was defended by 700–800 Turks under the experienced commander Alp-qara. Somewhat later, John's army marched on Laodicea and built fortifications around the city. The city fell with little resistance.

== Aftermath ==
John appointed a garrison and restocked the city with sufficient supplies. He then returned to Constantinople.
