= John Axouch =

Byzantine general (c.1087–c.1150)

Sebastos John Axouch
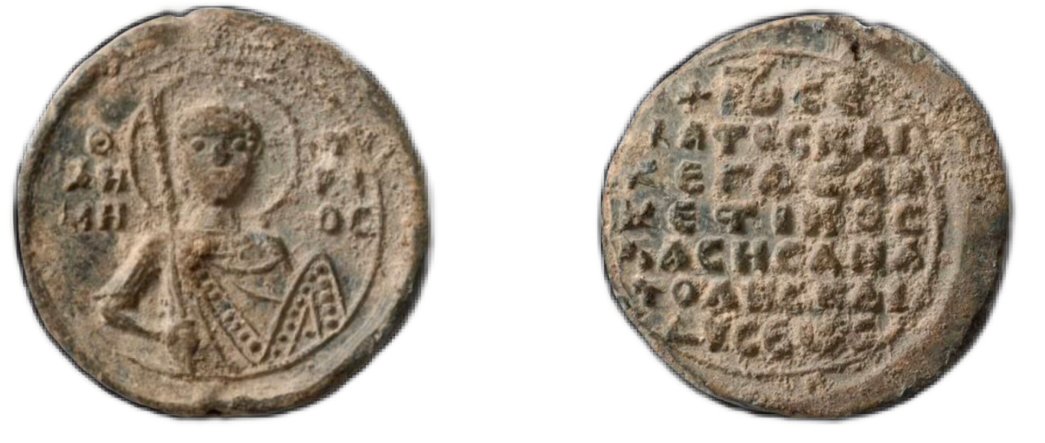
- Lead seal of John Axouch, with image of St. Demetrios
- Born: c. 1087
- Died: c. 1150
- Children: Alexios Axouch, Eudokia
- Military career
- Allegiance: Byzantine Empire
- Rank: Megas domestikos
- Commands: Commander-in-chief of the Byzantine army and de facto chief of the civil administration of the Byzantine Empire
- Conflicts: Campaigns of John II Komnenos, Battle of Beroia, Siege of Corfu (1149)

John Axouchos (Greek: Ἰωάννης Ἀξοῦχος, romanized: Iōánnēs Axoûchos, Greek pronunciation: [ioˈanis aˈksu.xos]; c. 1087–c. 1150), known as Axouch (Ἀξούχ), was the commander-in-chief (megas domestikos) of the Byzantine army during the reign of Emperor John II Komnenos (r. 1118–1143), and during the early part of the reign of his son Manuel I Komnenos (r. 1143–1180). He may also have served as the de facto chief of the civil administration of the Byzantine Empire. He was of Seljuk Turkic origin.

== Origin ==
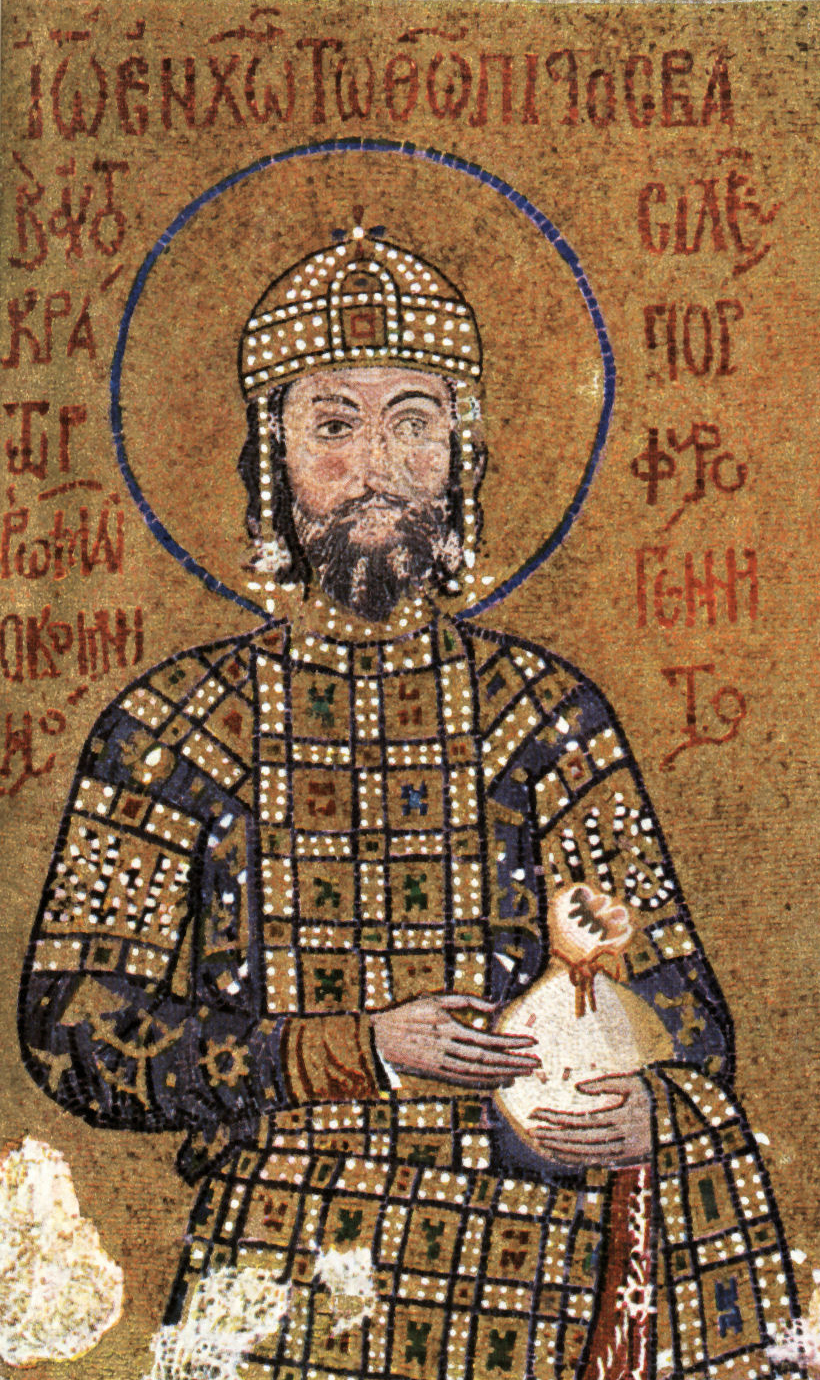
Emperor John II Komnenos (r. 1118–1143), close friend and benefactor of John Axouch.

John was a Seljuk Turk by birth. His family is unknown. He was referred to anachronistically as a "Persian" by John Kinnamos. As a child, he had been captured by the Norman forces of Bohemond of Taranto at the Siege of Nicaea in 1097 and given to Alexios I Komnenos as a present, and was thus raised in the imperial household. It is unknown why he was taken by Bohemond's forces; it has been speculated that he might've belonged to an important family.

Since he was nine or ten, the same age as his son, John Komnenos, Alexios decided to make the boy John's companion. Growing up, John remained a constant companion of John Komnenos, Alexios's co-emperor and heir; the two became close friends. When he ascended the throne as John II in 1118, he appointed Axouch as megas domestikos with the court title of sebastos. He was the emperor's only friend and confidant, and all members of the imperial family were required to make obeisance to him.

== Reign of John II ==
After foiling a plot against his throne and life by his sister Anna and her husband Nikephoros Bryennios (who betrayed the plot), John II tried to give his sister's confiscated property to Axouch. Axouch wisely refused, realising that such a gift would further sour his relations with the imperial family and make him unpopular with the higher aristocracy. Axouch also asked the emperor for clemency for Anna, and the two siblings were reconciled, at least to a degree. Thanks in part to the abilities of Axouch, the new emperor was able to deal with the initial difficulties of asserting his authority over the imperial family without alienating them. Because of this domestic ascendancy John II was able to concentrate on an aggressive foreign policy throughout most of his reign.

The emperor was an active soldier, campaigning in the Balkans, Anatolia and Syria; he and Axouch often collaborated in their efforts. In the taking of Laodicea from the Seljuk Turks in 1119, Axouch conducted the siege, which then allowed John II a swift victory when he arrived on the scene. This campaign opened up the land route across Anatolia to Antalya and Cilicia. He was wounded in the leg at Beroia in the Balkans in 1122 while fighting the Pechenegs. Axouch also played an active part in the campaigns of 1137–1138 in Cilicia, Antioch and northern Syria, during the course of which he was wounded again.

== Reign of Manuel I ==
In 1143, while preparing to conquer Crusader Antioch, John II died following a hunting accident in Cilicia. John Axouch was instrumental in gaining control of Constantinople for John's chosen successor, his younger surviving son Manuel I Komnenos, against the possible candidacies of his elder brother and uncle, both named Isaac. Leaving Manuel and the army in Cilicia, Axouch travelled rapidly and reached Constantinople before news of John's death; once in the capital he secured control of the imperial treasuries and regalia, and the persons of the two princes, whom he confined to the Pantokrator Monastery. Manuel's accession therefore suffered from no active opposition. Axouch was faithful to the wishes of John II, although he is recorded as having tried hard to persuade the dying emperor that his elder surviving son Isaac was the better candidate.

It is notable that some sources indicate that Axouch was much attached to Isaac and, at least early in his reign, Manuel was suspicious of any hint of collusion between his brother and Axouch. Once in power, however, Manuel confirmed Axouch's position as megas domestikos. Axouch was also the one responsible for the introduction of an oath of allegiance to the new emperor in the coronation ceremony, a practice which lasted until the end of the Empire.

At the emperor's table during a campaign in 1145–1146, a heated debate occurred, with comparisons being made between the martial qualities of Manuel and his father. John Axouch offensively extolled John II to the detriment of Manuel, and was vociferously supported by Manuel's brother Isaac. Tempers became inflamed and Isaac attacked his cousin, the future emperor Andronikos with a sword, the blow was deflected by the emperor with the aid of another kinsman. Axouch was punished for his part in the debacle by being deprived of the privilege of bearing the imperial seal. The episode is indicative of Axouch's integration within the imperial family. It has been suggested that Axouch's possession of the imperial seal before 1145–1146 meant that he was, in addition to his military duties, the head of the civil administration of the Empire. This was an unofficial position known at the time as the mesazon, and equivalent to a vizier or "prime-minister".

John Axouch commanded the forces acting against the Normans of Sicily in Corfu (1148–1149), initially as commander of the land forces, while the megas doux Stephanos Kontostephanos commanded the fleet, but after the latter's death in 1149, Axouch assumed command of the entire expedition. When rioting broke out between the Byzantine soldiery and the allied Venetians, Axouch tried to mediate but he eventually sent his bodyguard to quell the disturbance by force. Axouch's forces starved the Normans into submission in 1149, they surrendered their fortifications and withdrew from the island. John Axouch is believed to have died shortly after, possibly in 1150 or in early 1151 at the latest.

Unsurprisingly, for someone raised by Alexios I, Axouch appears to have been very well educated. He had a lively interest in theology, and is known to have asked searching questions of the theologian Nicholas of Methone concerning the nature of the 'indwelling of the Holy Spirit within the apostles'. Emperor Manuel is known to have personally pressed Nicholas to produce a reasoned answer to Axouch's enquiry.

== Legacy ==
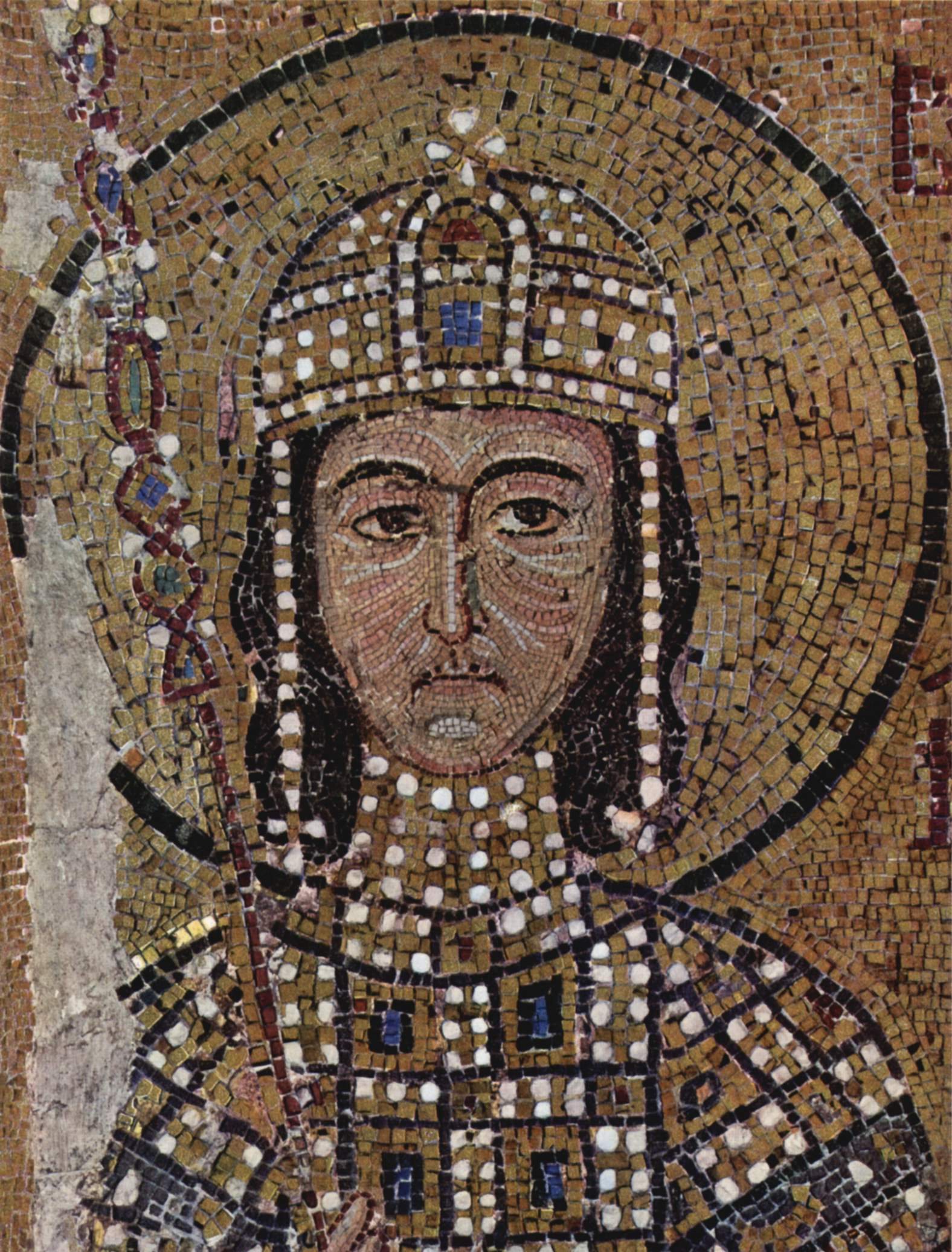
Alexios Komnenos, John II's son and co-emperor, and father-in-law of John Axouch's son Alexios.

John II led virtually all of the important campaigns conducted during his reign personally; as a result of this circumstance, Axouch is one of the few Byzantine commanders of this period to receive the notice of contemporary historians and chroniclers.

Axouch's ability and character were recognized and lauded by his contemporaries. Thus Michael Italikos called him the "Tower of the Empire of the Romans" and "an invincible rampart", while writers such as Nicholas Basilakes or bishop Nicholas of Methone dedicated works to him. The historian Niketas Choniates, born shortly after Axouch's death, gave the following description of John Axouch's qualities:

Not only were his hands skilled in war but they were also quick and agile in performing good works. Furthermore, the nobility and liberality of his mind quite overshadowed his humble origins and made Axuch beloved by all.

It has been suggested that the Axouch family, given their Turkish origins, formed a pro-Seljuk faction at the Byzantine court, in opposition to a pro-Western (Latin) clique. Because of the interpenetration of the elites at the Byzantine and Seljuk courts, a number of high-placed Byzantines defected to the Seljuks (including a nephew of Emperor John II), diplomatic channels were always available even during periods of open warfare.

== Family ==
John had a son, Alexios, who married Maria Komnene, the daughter of John II's eldest son and co-emperor Alexios (died 1142). Alexios Axouch was made protostrator, the second-in-command of the Byzantine army. In 1167, he was accused of treason and forced to enter a monastery. John Axouch's daughter, Eudokia, married Stephen Komnenos, a great-nephew of Emperor Alexios I Komnenos (r. 1081–1118).

== See also ==
- Komnenian army

== Sources ==
- Angold, Michael, (1984) The Byzantine Empire 1025–1204, a political history, Longman,
- Brand, Charles M. (1989). "The Turkish Element in Byzantium, Eleventh-Twelfth Centuries". Dumbarton Oaks Papers. 43. Washington, District of Columbia: Dumbarton Oaks, Trustees for Harvard University: 1–25. doi:10.2307/1291603. JSTOR 1291603.
- Choniates, Nicetas (1984). O City of Byzantium, Annals of Niketas Choniatēs. Translated by Harry J. Magoulias. Detroit: Wayne State University Press. ISBN 0-8143-1764-2.
- Cinnamus, Ioannes (1976). Deeds of John and Manuel Comnenus. New York, New York and West Sussex, United Kingdom: Columbia University Press. ISBN 978-0-231-04080-8.
- Guilland, Rodolphe (1967). "Le grand domestique". Recherches sur les institutions byzantines [Studies on the Byzantine Institutions]. Berliner byzantinische Arbeiten 35 (in French). Vol. I. Berlin and Amsterdam: Akademie-Verlag & Adolf M. Hakkert. pp. 405–425. OCLC 878894516.
- Kazhdan, Alexander; Cutler, Anthony (1991). "Axouch". In Kazhdan, Alexander (ed.). The Oxford Dictionary of Byzantium. Oxford and New York: Oxford University Press. p. 239. ISBN 0-19-504652-8.
- Magdalino, Paul (2002) [1993]. The Empire of Manuel I Komnenos, 1143–1180 (Second ed.). Cambridge: Cambridge University Press. ISBN 9780521526531.
- Treadgold, Warren (1997). A History of the Byzantine State and Society. Stanford, California: Stanford University Press. ISBN 0-8047-2630-2.
