= Trebizond Alexander Romance =

A deluxe illuminated manuscript of Pseudo-Callisthenes' Alexander Romance

A letter from the Kandake is read to Alexander

The Trebizond Alexander Romance (or Venice Alexander Romance) is a deluxe illuminated manuscript of Pseudo-Callisthenes' Alexander Romance. It is the only copy of the Greek text that is completely illustrated. It is now shelfmarked Codex Graecus 5 in the Hellenic Institute of Byzantine and Post-Byzantine Studies in Venice in Venice. It belongs to the γ (gamma) redaction of the Romance.

Graecus 5 measures 320 by 240 millimetres (12.6 in × 9.4 in) and is made of 193 leaves of bombycin (Oriental paper) decorated with 250 miniatures. It was probably produced for Emperor Alexios III of Trebizond (r. 1349–1390). The artists who worked on it were probably Georgians, since the text within the images is Georgian. The miniatures have explanatory rubricated captions in Greek, to which were added elaborated translations into Ottoman Turkish after the manuscript passed into the hands of the Ottoman sultan Mehmet II (r. 1451–1481).

== Editions ==
- Karagianni, Flora; Antonopoulou, Theodora; Papathomas, Amphilochios; Grammatiki, Karla; Galanis, Timoleon, eds. (2022). Codex 5: Hellenic Institute of Byzantine and Post-Byzantine Studies in Venice. Istituto Ellenico di Studi Bizantini e Postbizantini.

== Bibliography ==
- Kastritsis, Dimitri (2011). "The Trebizond Alexander Romance (Venice Hellenic Institute Codex Gr. 5): The Ottoman Fate of a Fourteenth-century Illustrated Byzantine Manuscript". Journal of Turkish Studies. 36: 103–131.
- Mathiesen, Sarah Elaine (2015). Alexander the Great: Created in Whose Image? A Study in the Byzantinization of Μέγας Αλέξανδρος in Venice Hellenic Institute Codex Graecus 5 (Ph.D. dissertation). Tulane University.
- Ross, David J. A. (1963). Alexander Historiatus: A Guide to Medieval Illustrated Alexander Literature. The Warburg Institute, University of London.
- Trahoulia, Nicolette S. (1997). The Venice Alexander Romance, Hellenic Institute Codex Gr. 5: A Study of Alexander the Great as an Imperial Paradigm in Byzantine Art and Literature (Ph.D. dissertation). Harvard University.
- Trahoulia, Nicolette S. (2017). "The Alexander Romance". In Vasiliki Tsamakda (ed.). A Companion to Byzantine Illustrated Manuscripts. Brill. pp. 169–176.
