= Farkas Gatal =

Hungarian lord

Palatine of Hungary
- Reign: c. 1177–1183
- Predecessor: Ampud
- Successor: Denis
- Died: after 1183
- Noble family: gens Gatal

Farkas from the kindred Gatal (Hungarian: Gatal nembeli Farkas; died after 1183) was a Hungarian lord in the second half of the 12th century, who served as Palatine of Hungary from around 1177 to 1183.

== Family ==
Farkas (Forcos) was born into the gens (clan) Gatal, which possessed landholdings in Sopron County. Their eponymous seat, the village Gatal laid in the area between Csepreg and Répcevis. His brother was Gatal, who served as ispán of Sopron County around 1156 and of Bodrog County around 1164. Gatal was ancestor of the Endrédi, the Szász de Tamasóc and the Gatalóci noble families. Farkas had no known descendants.

== Career ==
Farkas first appears in contemporary records around 1156, when acted as pristaldus (royal bailiff) during the process, when Géza II of Hungary donated the estates Locsmánd, Gyirót and Sarud in Sopron County (present-day Lutzmannsburg, Kroatisch Geresdorf and Frankenau in Austria, respectively) to German knights Gottfried and Albert, ancestors of the Frankói family. Farkas registered the brothers as the new owners of the lands, defining their boundaries.

Farkas was a confidant of Béla III of Hungary. Succeeding Ampud, Farkas was appointed Palatine of Hungary around 1177. He is first mentioned in this capacity, when he interceded with the king so that a certain Caba, who had no male heirs, could leave his estates, vineyards, slaves and livestock to the Pannonhalma Abbey in his last will and testament. Following the death of Emperor Manuel I Komnenos in September 1180, Béla III launched a campaign in order to restore the Hungarian suzerainty in Dalmatia. Farkas was entrusted to lead the Hungarian troops till the Adriatic Sea. Béla III retook suzerainty of Dalmatia seemingly without serious confrontation. Farkas Gatal resided in Zadar (Zara) in March 1181.

Returning Hungary in 1181, Farkas judged over some serfs, who escaped from Cégény Abbey, also known as the Monastery of the Virgin Mary along the river Szamos (Someș), to neighboring lords. According to historian Tibor Szőcs, this was a special royal mandate and did not relate to his position as palatine. In the same year, Farkas bought the estate Szeles (or Szőlős) in Baranya County from lady Froa, the widow of provost Marcellus, for 120 marks (the manor and its surrounding landholdings laid in the territory of present-day Pécsudvard). Béla III approved the contract of sale in his charter; on this occasion, the king emphasized the importance of written records, ordering that a charter was to be issued for all transactions proceeding in his presence, which marked the beginning of establishment of a permanent chancellery. The Esztergom Chapter sold a portion of land in Kéménd (present-day Kamenín, Slovakia) to Farkas Gatal for two marks in 1183, which is preserved by the charter of Nicholas, Archbishop of Esztergom. Farkas was succeeded by Denis as Palatine of Hungary by the year 1184.

== Sources ==
- Karácsonyi, János (1901). A magyar nemzetségek a XIV. század közepéig. II. kötet [The Hungarian genera until the middle of the 14th century, Vol. 2] (in Hungarian). Hungarian Academy of Sciences.
- Makk, Ferenc (1989). The Árpáds and the Comneni: Political Relations between Hungary and Byzantium in the 12th century (Translated by György Novák). Akadémiai Kiadó. ISBN 963-05-5268-X.
- Markó, László (2006). A magyar állam főméltóságai Szent Istvántól napjainkig: Életrajzi Lexikon [Great Officers of State in Hungary from King Saint Stephen to Our Days: A Biographical Encyclopedia] (in Hungarian). Helikon Kiadó. ISBN 963-547-085-1.
- Szőcs, Tibor (2014). A nádori intézmény korai története, 1000–1342 [An Early History of the Palatinal Institution: 1000–1342] (in Hungarian). Magyar Tudományos Akadémia Támogatott Kutatások Irodája. ISBN 978-963-508-697-9.
- Zsoldos, Attila (2011). Magyarország világi archontológiája, 1000–1301 [Secular Archontology of Hungary, 1000–1301] (in Hungarian). História, MTA Történettudományi Intézete. ISBN 978-963-9627-38-3.

Farkas Genus Gatal Born: ? Died: after 1183
Political offices
Preceded by Ampud	Palatine of Hungary c. 1177–1183	Succeeded by Denis
