= Thomas II, Palatine of Hungary =

Thomas

Palatine of Hungary
- Reign: 1185–1186
- Predecessor: Denis
- Successor: Mog
- Died: 1186
- Buried: Ercsi monastery, Szigetújfalu

Thomas (Hungarian: Tamás; died 1186) was a lord in the Kingdom of Hungary in the second half of the 12th century, who served as Palatine of Hungary from 1185 to 1186.

== Career ==
It is possible that Thomas belonged to the gens (clan) Záh, which acquired large-scale domains in Transdanubia. Thomas possessed landholdings in Fejér County, for instance Vál. He is definitely not identical with that Thomas, who functioned as palatine too in 1163, in the court of anti-king Stephen IV of Hungary.

Thomas' career reached its peak by the reign of Béla III of Hungary. He was styled as ispán of Fejér County in 1183. He was installed to the position of Palatine of Hungary in 1184 or 1185. He was mentioned in this capacity throughout the next year. According to a 16th-century note in the Formulary Book of Somogyvár, Thomas died already in 1186.

== Monastery foundation ==
A royal charter of Béla IV of Hungary, issued on 3 October 1269, narrates that Thomas had founded a monastery in a once existing river island near Ercsi on the left bank of Danube (present-day administratively belongs to Szigetújfalu). Thomas invited Benedictine friars and the monastery was dedicated to Saint Nicholas. In a single document, the place was referred to as "Thomas' island" (Latin: Insulam Thomae) in 1211. According to the aforementioned document, Thomas unlawfully donated the tithes of Vál and Dörgicse to the newly established monastery during the foundation to financially support the monks. As a result, Béla IV recovered the tithes to the Diocese of Veszprém in 1269.

Art historian Géza Entz placed the palmette carvings in parallel in the 12th-century stonemasonry workshops in Székesfehérvár, Somogyvár and Pécs. After completing the formal investigations, the author came to the conclusion that the monastery of Ercsi was related to all the royal or closely related construction workshops of the time, which gave special significance to the founding of Palatine Thomas. According to the Formulary Book of Somogyvár, Thomas was buried in the sacristy of the monastery, which perhaps assumes that at the time of the palatine's death the monastery was not yet fully completed. Andrew II of Hungary handed over the monastery to the Cistercians around 1208. The building blocks of the abandoned monastery were used in the reconstruction of the Saint Leonard church in Szigetújfalu in the 18th century.

== Sources ==
- Bácsatyai, Dániel (2019). A Somogyvári formuláskönyv évkönyvei [The Annals of the Formulary Book of Somogyvár] (in Hungarian). Városi Levéltár és Kutatóintézet. ISBN 978-963-8406-21-7.
- Entz, Géza (1965). "Az ercsi bencés monostor [The Benedictine monastery of Ercsi]". Művészettörténeti Értesítő. 14 (4): 241–246. ISSN 0027-5247.
- Markó, László (2006). A magyar állam főméltóságai Szent Istvántól napjainkig: Életrajzi Lexikon [Great Officers of State in Hungary from King Saint Stephen to Our Days: A Biographical Encyclopedia] (in Hungarian). Helikon Kiadó. ISBN 963-547-085-1.
- Vida, Beáta (2013). ""Monasterium de Erche situm in insula loci secreti": Ercsi monostorának története ["Monasterium de Erche situm in insula loci secreti": The History of the Monastery of Ercsi]". In Kovács, Szilvia; Révész, Éva (eds.). Műhelyszemináriumi dolgozatok I. (in Hungarian). SZTE BTK Történelemtudományi Doktori Iskola. pp. 181–197. ISBN 978-963-306-187-9.
- Zsoldos, Attila (2011). Magyarország világi archontológiája, 1000–1301 [Secular Archontology of Hungary, 1000–1301] (in Hungarian). História, MTA Történettudományi Intézete. ISBN 978-963-9627-38-3.

Political offices
| Preceded by Denis | Palatine of Hungary; 1185–1186 | Succeeded by Mog |
