= Denis, Palatine of Hungary =

Denis

Palatine of Hungary
- Reign: 1184
- Predecessor: Farkas Gatal
- Successor: Thomas
- Died: after 1184

Denis (Hungarian: Dénes, Greek: Διονύσιος/Dionysios) was an influential lord in the Kingdom of Hungary in the second half of the 12th century. He was Palatine of Hungary in 1184, Ban of Slavonia between 1181 and 1184, Ban of Dalmatia in 1183, and ispán of at least three counties. He was a commander of the Hungarian army fighting against the Byzantine Empire in the reign of Stephen III of Hungary.

== Early career ==
Denis possibly originated from the northern part of the Kingdom of Hungary. He started his career during the reign of Géza II of Hungary. It is possible he is identical with that Denis, who is referred to as ispán of Bodrog County by a non-authentic charter from 1145. A certain comes Denis is mentioned among the testimonies by a charter of Géza II in 1146. Prior to 1162, Géza removed a child named Botus, son of Gab from the service of the Archdiocese of Kalocsa and took him into his own service for his son of the same age. According to Stephen's charter around 1163 or 1164, Denis delivered Botus to the court of the young prince upon the instruction of the monarch.

== Fights against the Byzantines ==
Setting in motion again affairs which had been settled, the Hungarians' king dispatched Dionysius, one of the aristocrats of his court who was experienced in many wars, to lay claim to Sirmion with a large army. [...] As it seemed right to the [Byzantine] councilors to attack Dionysius by night, they set out and advanced with their whole force. Coming where Dionysius was encamped, since they found the camp totally deserted of men, they commenced to feel afraid. [...] Since daylight was already distinctly visible, the Hungarians perceived them and commenced to launch their cavalry against the [Byzantine] camp [...]. Confused thereby, they [Byzantines] turned to retreat. [...] The pursuing Hungarians did not slay very many of the Romans, nor take many. [...] Then Dionysius, intending to elevate in importance what he had done, gathered together the few bodies of the fallen and reared a very large mound over them, considering that the slaughter would be equated to the size of the mound.

— John Kinnamos: Deeds of John and Manuel Comnenus

Géza II died in May 1162. Denis was a member of that faction led by Queen Euphrosyne of Kiev and Archbishop Lucas of Esztergom, who supported the coronation of the 15-year-old Stephen III, whose legitimacy was challenged by his uncles Ladislaus II and Stephen IV, both of them enjoyed the support of the Byzantine Emperor Manuel I Komnenos. The imperial troops prepared for an invasion of Hungary weeks after Stephen's coronation, but several magnates agreed to accept Ladislaus as a "compromise candidate" for the Hungarian throne. Stephen's army was routed at Kapuvár. Denis was among those barons, who fled from Hungary and sought refuge in Austria together with Stephen III in July 1162. Denis is referred to as simply comes (or ispán) in 1162, when Stephen issued his only known royal charter from that year, possibly during his exile or shortly after his return to Hungary in the second half of 1162. Stephen III mustered an army and supplemented it with German mercenaries, defeating his uncle Stephen IV in June 1163. It is plausible that Denis took part in the military campaigns, based on John Kinnamos' account, who stated that Denis "was experienced in many wars" prior to 1166. Denis was responsible for establishing a defense system along the Lower Danube in the border with the Byzantine Empire.

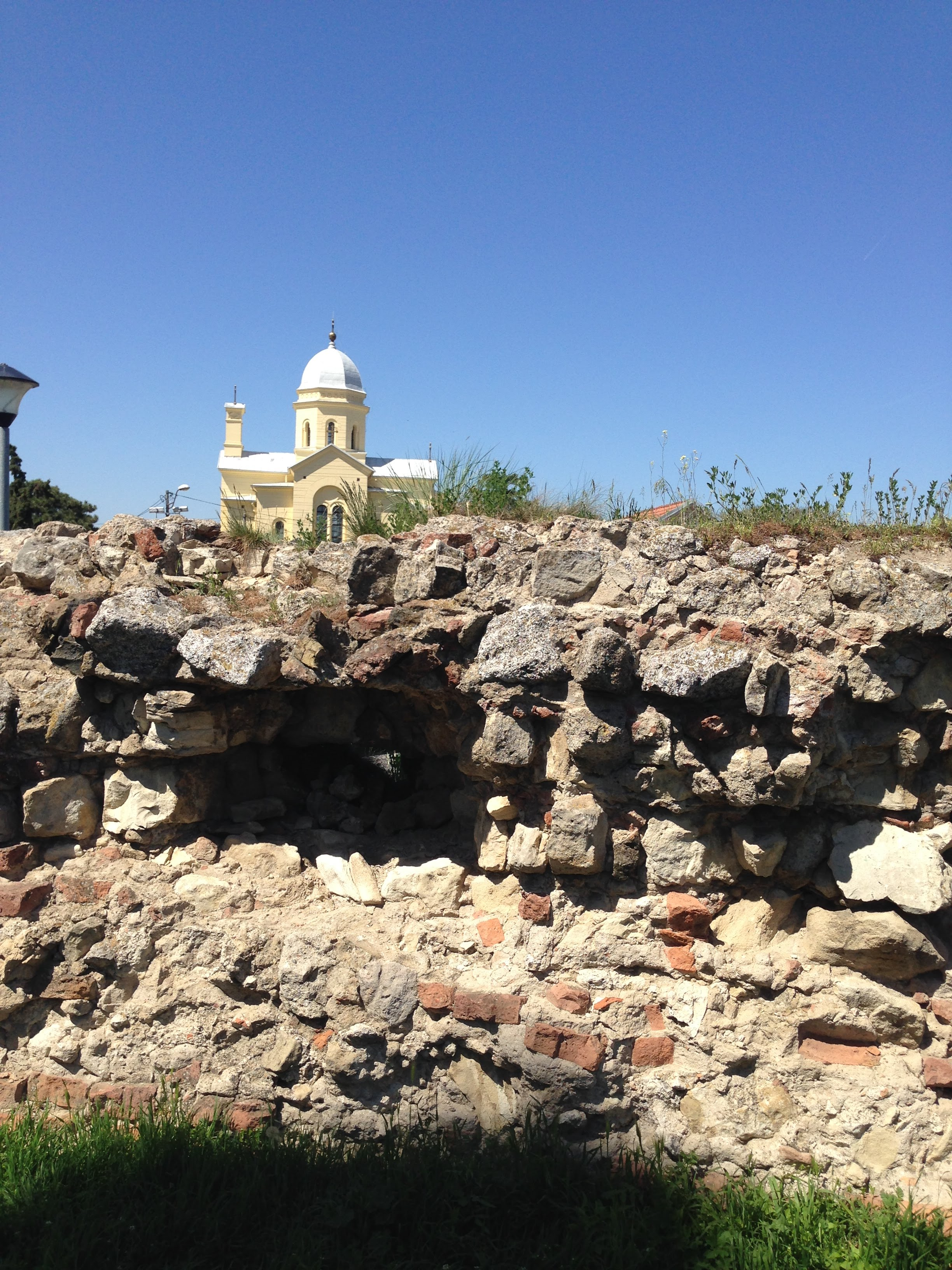
The ruins of Zemun Fortress (today in Serbia)

Although Stephen III successfully defended his throne against the Byzantine intervention, he was obliged to renounce Sirmium and Dalmatia in favor of Emperor Manuel following an unsuccessful campaign in 1165. In order to recover the provinces, a Hungarian army under the command of Denis stormed into Sirmium in the spring of 1166. Henry of Mügeln relates that Stephen III instructed Denis to recover Sirmium for Hungary; in contrast, historian Paul Stephenson considered that the Hungarian king – who, as he argued, had no reason to support the violation of the peace treaty with Manuel – was unable to prevent "the uprising by his disgruntled nobles". Denis and his troops routed the local Byzantine contingent led by generals Michael Gabras – governor of the province – and Michael Branas, each other's rivals, and occupied the whole province with the exception of Zimony (present-day Zemun, Serbia). Byzantine historian Niketas Choniates narrates that Denis laid siege to the fort, but the arriving Byzantine imperial troops successfully repelled the attack. In order to retaliation, Emperor Manuel sent armies against Hungary, which plundered Transylvania. The Byzantine campaign caused great devastation in the eastern territories of the Kingdom of Hungary, forcing Stephen III to seek reconciliation and Henry Jasomirgott, Duke of Austria mediated an armistice. Despite that, following Denis' successful campaign, another Hungarian military leader Ampud invaded Dalmatia in the autumn of 1166.

Emperor Manuel dispatched an army to Sirmium with his nephew and megas doux Andronikos Kontostephanos as commander and sent his fleet to Zimony after Easter 1167. According to John Kinnamos, Denis gathered an army of 15,000 men from 37 counties (their ispáns were also present) with him as commander-in-chief, also recruiting no small number of allied forces as mercenaries, especially Germans [Austrians], as Niketas Choniates writes. Both Byzantine chroniclers emphasize Denis' overconfidence. According to Choniates, Denis was "a man of mettle who had often drubbed the enemy's ranks, and, boasting over their successes, they marched out in a show of arrogance" and when the imperial army crossed the river "Istros" (i.e. Lower Danube), he "boasted loudly that he would gather once more the bones of the Romans fallen in battle and raise a sepulchral mound to serve as a trophy, as he had done in the past". Kinnamos narrates that Denis was "filled with courage and very ironically ordered the Hungarians to raise their cups and drink the health of the Romans". 14th-century German chronicler Henry of Mügeln describes Denis as a "strong knight". Denis led his army advancing as far as Zimony. Denis drew his army up in three divisions in a single broad battle line, with infantry drawn up in the centre and behind the cavalry, upon which the Hungarians clearly relied for the effectiveness of their attack. On 8 July 1167, the two armies clashed near the fort along the river Sava. The Byzantines, assisted by the river fleet, achieved a decisive victory, 2,000 men were killed, while five Hungarian ispáns along with 800 soldiers were captured. Denis narrowly escaped the battlefield "with few", his shield, armor and war horse were also taken, when the Byzantine army plundered their enemy's abandoned encampment.

== Powerful lord ==
Following the defeat, Stephen III signed a peace treaty renouncing the duchy – consisted of Sirmium, Croatia, Dalmatia and Bosnia – that their father had bequeathed upon his brother, Béla, who was sent to Constantinople earlier. Despite his failure, Denis retained his influence in the royal court. Three royal charters style him "comes" in the years 1171–1172. It is possible he served as ispán of Bács County, which laid at the Byzantine–Hungarian border along Lower Danube, already in 1171, although only a non-authentic charter refers to him with this title. Following the death of Stephen III in 1172, Denis, despite their previous antagonism during the Byzantine wars, supported Béla's ascension to the Hungarian throne – whose legitimacy was contested by the youngest brother Géza. Denis was appointed ispán of Bács County prior to 1177. In that year, Denis plausibly participated in the preliminary negotiations to conclude a peace treaty in Venice between Frederick I, Holy Roman Emperor and the pro-papal Lombard League. As a result of Denis' negotiations, Béla III and Frederick began to normalize bilateral relations between Hungary and the Holy Roman Empire in early 1177. After the talks, Christian, Archbishop of Mainz (Frederick's chancellor) requested Patriarch Ulrich II of Aquileia to escort Denis till the Austrian border.

Emperor Manuel died in September 1180, which marked the beginning of the slow disintegration of the Byzantine Empire. Béla III reoccupied Croatia, Dalmatia and Sirmium, along with the then Venetian-controlled Zadar without combat actions at the turn of 1180 and 1181. The Hungarian king intended to reorganize the province's royal administration. Retaining his position of ispán of Bács County, Denis was installed as Ban of Slavonia in 1181. He was also styled as "Ban of Croatia and Dalmatia", then "governor of maritime parts" in 1183 (succeeding Maurus Győr), and "Ban of Maritime Provinces" (Croatian: Primorje, Hungarian: Tengermellék) in 1184, which reflect he had jurisdiction over all Croatia and Dalmatia, and his suzerainty extended until the river Danube. According to historian Gyula Kristó, the bans took charge of the area between the rivers Sava and Drava in the period between 1167 and 1180, since Denis recovered an estate in Varaždin County to the Diocese of Zagreb upon the instruction of Béla III in 1181. Historian Judit Gál considered after Béla recovered Dalmatia, Hungary's territories beyond the Drava were initially consolidated under a single ban after 1183, during the terms of Denis then Kalán Bár-Kalán. Gábor Szeberényi argued their power and authority might have resembled that of a Duke of Slavonia. According to a charter, Denis adjudicated a lawsuit on the advice and contribution of the župans of Slavonia. His pristaldus (bailiff) referred to Denis as "his lord" ("dominus meus"), as kind of a sign of evolution of a separate provincial court of the ban in Slavonia and Croatia.

Succeeding Farkas Gatal, Denis was made Palatine of Hungary in 1184. In this capacity, Béla III delegated him into the judicial body, of which Judge royal Charena and comes Achilles were also members, which judged over the lawsuit between Tihany Abbey and the royal udvornici of Esztergom, according to a document issued by the collegiate chapter of Székesfehérvár. Tibor Szőcs emphasized this special royal mandate did not connect Denis' court dignity. Denis was succeeded as palatine by Thomas in 1185, at the latest. A non-authentic royal charter refers to Denis as ispán of Bács County in 1186. The fate of Denis is unknown, he had no known wives nor descendants. Historian Attila Zsoldos claimed he is identical with that namesake lord, who served as ispán of Sopron (1197) then Újvár (or Abaúj; 1198–1199) counties, during the reign of Emeric, King of Hungary.

== Sources ==
=== Primary sources ===
- Deeds of John and Manuel Comnenus by John Kinnamos (Translated by Charles M. Brand) (1976). Columbia University Press. ISBN 0-231-04080-6.
- O City of Byzantium, Annals of Niketas Choniatēs (Translated by Harry J. Magoulias) (1984). Wayne State University Press. ISBN 978-0-8143-1764-8.

=== Secondary sources ===
- Gál, Judit (2020). Dalmatia and the Exercise of Royal Authority in the Árpád-Era Kingdom of Hungary. Arpadiana III., Research Centre for the Humanities. ISBN 978-963-416-227-8.
- Kristó, Gyula (1979). A feudális széttagolódás Magyarországon [Feudal Anarchy in Hungary] (in Hungarian). Akadémiai Kiadó. ISBN 963-05-1595-4.
- Makk, Ferenc (1989). The Árpáds and the Comneni: Political Relations between Hungary and Byzantium in the 12th century (Translated by György Novák). Akadémiai Kiadó. ISBN 963-05-5268-X.
- Markó, László (2006). A magyar állam főméltóságai Szent Istvántól napjainkig: Életrajzi Lexikon [Great Officers of State in Hungary from King Saint Stephen to Our Days: A Biographical Encyclopedia] (in Hungarian). Helikon Kiadó. ISBN 963-547-085-1.
- Stephenson, Paul (2000). Byzantium's Balkan Frontier: A Political Study of the Northern Balkans, 900–1204. Cambridge University Press. ISBN 978-0-521-02756-4.
- Szőcs, Tibor (2014). A nádori intézmény korai története, 1000–1342 [An Early History of the Palatinal Institution: 1000–1342] (in Hungarian). Magyar Tudományos Akadémia Támogatott Kutatások Irodája. ISBN 978-963-508-697-9.
- Thoroczkay, Gábor, ed. (2018). Írott források az 1116–1205 közötti magyar történelemről [Written Sources of the Hungarian History between 1116 and 1205] (in Hungarian). Szegedi Középkorász Műhely. ISBN 978-615-80398-3-3.
- Zsoldos, Attila (2011). Magyarország világi archontológiája, 1000–1301 [Secular Archontology of Hungary, 1000–1301] (in Hungarian). História, MTA Történettudományi Intézete. ISBN 978-963-9627-38-3.

Political offices
Preceded by (?) Ampud	Ban of Slavonia; 1181–1184	Succeeded by Kalán Bár-Kalán
Preceded by Farkas Gatal	Palatine of Hungary; 1184	Succeeded by Thomas
