= Thomas I, Palatine of Hungary =

Hungarian noble

Thomas

Palatine of Hungary
- Reign: 1163 (in rebellion)
- Predecessor: Héder
- Successor: Héder
- Died: after 1163

Thomas (Hungarian: Tamás; died after 1163) was a Hungarian noble in the second half of the 12th century. Anti-king Stephen IV of Hungary, who usurped the crown of his nephew, Stephen III, appointed him Palatine of Hungary in 1163. Meanwhile, Héder was considered the rightful holder of the dignity in the court of Stephen III.

His name is appeared once in the only surviving extant royal charter of Stephen IV, who issued the document in Esztergom, where Thomas belonged to his entourage. Thomas was deprived from his position, when Stephen IV was decisively defeated and captured by his nephew in the battle of Székesfehérvár on 19 June 1163. Thomas' fate is unknown. It is plausible that he is not identical with that namesake lord, who served as palatine in the 1180s, during the reign of Béla III.

== Sources ==
- Makk, Ferenc (1989). The Árpáds and the Comneni: Political Relations between Hungary and Byzantium in the 12th century (Translated by György Novák). Akadémiai Kiadó. ISBN 963-05-5268-X.
- Markó, László (2006). A magyar állam főméltóságai Szent Istvántól napjainkig: Életrajzi Lexikon [Great Officers of State in Hungary from King Saint Stephen to Our Days: A Biographical Encyclopedia] (in Hungarian). Helikon Kiadó. ISBN 963-547-085-1.
- Zsoldos, Attila (2011). Magyarország világi archontológiája, 1000–1301 [Secular Archontology of Hungary, 1000–1301] (in Hungarian). História, MTA Történettudományi Intézete. ISBN 978-963-9627-38-3.

Political offices
| Preceded by Héder | Palatine of Hungary for anti-king Stephen IV; 1163 | Succeeded by Héder |
