= Diploma of Froa =

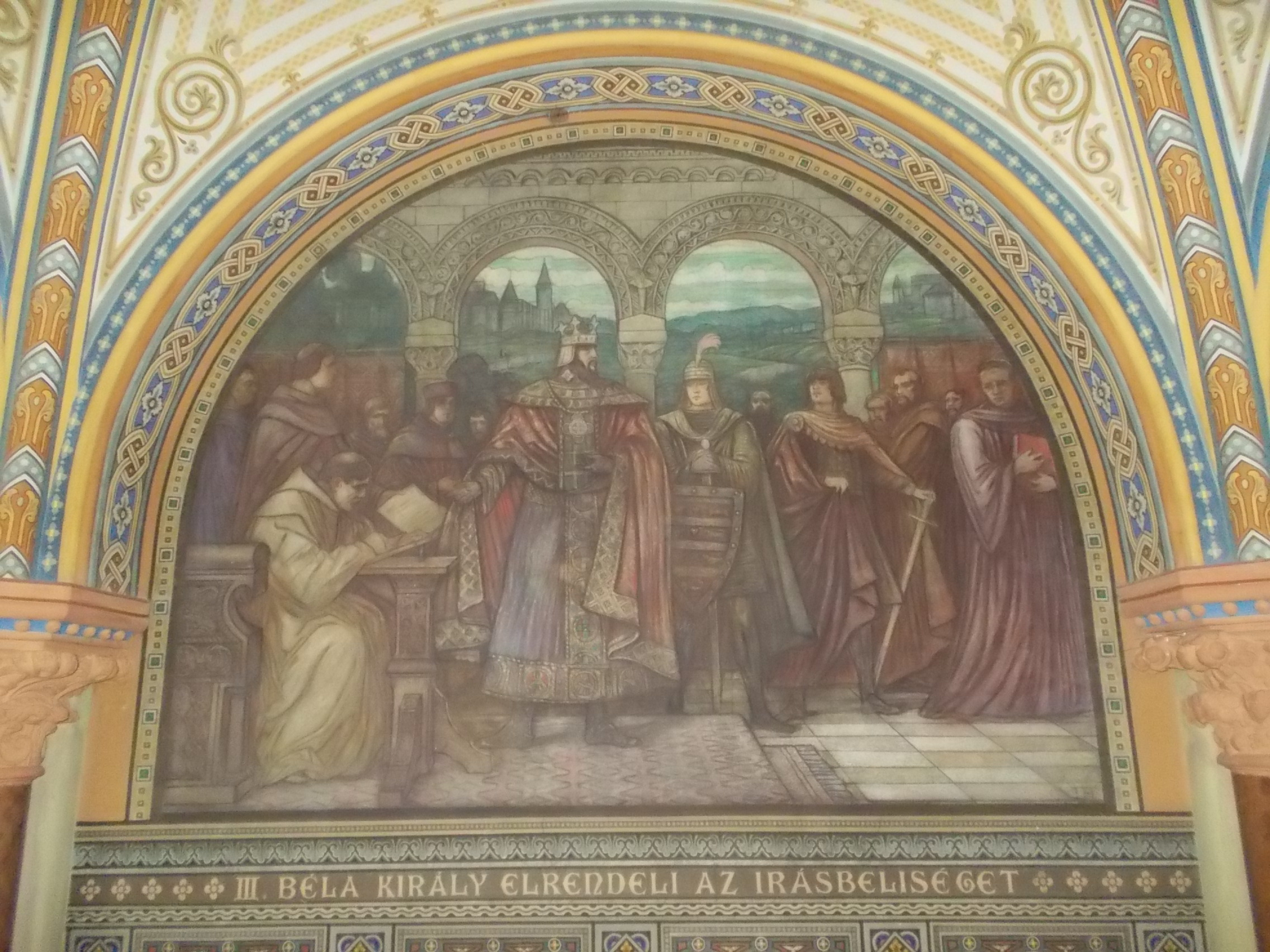
King Béla III ordering the use of written records, a fresco-secco by Andor Dudits in the main building of the National Archives of Hungary

The Diploma of Froa (Hungarian: Froa-oklevél) is a royal charter issued in 1181 by King Béla III of Hungary, in which he approved a transaction between two of his subjects. Hungarian historiography considered for a long time that the monarch ordered the introduction of clerkly literacy in the arenga (prologue) of the document, which was then followed by the establishment of a permanent chancellery in the royal court.

== Appearance ==
The diploma is a 35.5 × 25.5 cm Nordic parchment cut into a rectangular shape, reinforced with a hanging seal, and chirographed along a straight line. It is a ceremonial certificate, which, however, does not contain any graphic symbols apart from the initial 'Q', its text is written in black ink in early Gothic script. In its first line, as is typical for more decorative diplomas, there are elongated letters (sciptura longior). Regarding its structure, according to archivist László Fejérpataky, the diploma shows primitive, undeveloped forms: "It is introduced by arenga; after the promulgation formula, the king speaks subjective (ego). At the end, a very wordy anathema can be read, a typical part of the certificates from the beginning of the reign of Béla III".

- Scanned digital image of the diploma

== Content ==
Lady Froa was the widow of a certain provost Marcellus. According to historian László Koszta, his title did not denote an ecclesiastical position (although celibacy was not universal among the clerics in Hungary, as Pope Alexander III complained), rather, he might have been a royal official at the head of an area or the superior of a hospes (foreign-origin) community. The charter narrates that lady Froa originally intended to give her estate Szeles (or Szőlős) in Baranya County (the manor and its surrounding landholdings laid in the territory of present-day Pécsudvard) to the hospital house of Pécs, but she changed her mind and asked King Béla III for permission to sell the estate to Palatine Farkas Gatal for 120 marks. Béla consulted on the matter with his advisors, bishops Makar of Pécs, Peter of Eger and notary Paul of Transylvania, and authorized the transaction.

The document says that Farkas Gatal "is considered by his public reputation as a child of legality and an educator of truth, who does not take possession of anything by force, but uses legally acquired money to get what he can get at a price from somewhere". The next paragraph lists the twenty-seven free people working on the mansion by name, in addition to the boundaries of the estate Szeles. Among the witnesses during the procedure were Gilbertus, master of the hospital of Pécs, members of the local cathedral chapter and the local secular elite. The royal charter was drafted by notary Paul (also the bishop of Transylvania). The document closes with a curse formula typical of the era.

== The arenga and its historiography ==
"Since, due to the imperfection of human nature, with the passage of time, forgetfulness easily creeps into the memory of past things, it is worthwhile to record and confirm in writing everything that was a fact of agreement between the parties involved in legal transactions, so that their solidity remains inviolable due to the expressive power of the writing and the testimony of competent persons. On the basis of this consideration, and also bearing in mind the interest of My Royal Majesty regarding the future, that any matter discussed and concluded in my presence should not later become invalid, I, Béla, the excellent King of Hungary, have come to see the need that all difficulties and matters discussed in the hearing of My Majesty, must be confirmed by the testimony of the writing."
Prologue (arenga) of Béla's royal charter (1181)

The medieval chronicles – Simon of Kéza's Gesta Hunnorum et Hungarorum and the Illuminated Chronicle – narrate that Béla III "introduced the same form of addressing petitions as was customary in the Roman and imperial court", which suggests that the Royal Chancery began functioning as a separate office during his reign. In contrast, Roger of Torre Maggiore emphasizes in his work Carmen miserabile that Béla IV (r. 1235–1270) was that king, who ordered that the nobles "could not open their suits in his court and speak to him personally, but had to submit petitions to the chancellors and expect judgment in their cases from them".

The Diploma of Froa was first published by Philipp Ernst Spiess, the archivist of Alexander, Margrave of Brandenburg-Ansbach in 1783. The data was taken by Hungarian archivist György Pray. The assumed connection between the charter's arenga and the "introduction of the system of petitions" – taking the words of the arenga literally – first appeared in a note by physician József Pólya from a lexicon Közhasznu esmeretek tára (1833). In the second half of the 19th century, several historians shared this viewpoint, for instance, Mihály Horváth, Imre Hajnik and Árpád Kerékgyártó. The latter scholar was the first, who did not only mention the introduction of the institution of petitions, but also stated that Béla ordered the matters discussed before him to be written down in the arenga of his royal charter from 1181. László Fejérpataky (in 1885) rejected the introduction of the petition system regarding the reign of Béla III, but maintained connection between the arenga and the "introduction of clerkly literacy". Thereafter, the so-called "literacy topos" spread out the Hungarian historiography (e.g. Elemér Mályusz, László Mezey and Bernát L. Kumorovitz), then also in fine arts (the fresco-secco painted by Andor Dudits) and secondary and higher education in history in the 20th century.

Apart from some skeptical and unresonant remarks (for instance, László Erdélyi and Imre Szentpétery), the "literacy topos" remained unrefuted until the 1960s and 70s. Slovak historian Richard Marsina (1965) classified the arenga to the type of oblivio memoria, which contrasts the transience of human memory with the permanence of writing and was widespread in the royal charters of Hungary at the turn of the 12th and 13th centuries, but similar ones can be found in France and Denmark from the same period. Hungarian historian András Kubinyi argued in his 1975 that, in the list of witnesses, only members of the local elite appear, not holders of national dignities, which would be expected in the case of a comprehensive chancellery reform. In addition, a longer period of time – several months or years – passed between the discussion (actum) and writing (datum) of the case, which is primarily justified by the fact that the drafter of the document, Paul, a former notary, is already listed as the incumbent bishop of Transylvania in the royal charter. Kubinyi also gave examples from the arenga of diplomas from neighboring countries. According to the historian, there is no need to look for normative (literal) content in the text that dictates the writing of private law, since the arenga can basically be derived from the practice of the European diploma formulation, and it can even refer to the memories of a clergyman of Walloon-origin from Pécs from his homeland. Following Kubinyi's study, Hungarian historiography moved in the direction of "topos skepticism" in the following decades.

== Analysis ==
The chirography shows that the diploma was made in two original copies. It is possible that the second copy was kept by the cathedral chapter of Pécs. The action contained in the document was considered a private transaction, which, however, required royal confirmation in accordance with the late 11th century laws of Coloman, King of Hungary. Historian János Halász argued if the royal chancellery did not possess an own copy, it contradicts the purpose of the written order, since "the memory of things past is easily obscured", and without a copy, posterity could hardly refer to its decision. According to László Fejérpataky, Paul was responsible for the case, because he was still acting as a notary when the legal fact contained in the diploma was recorded, so he was still responsible for the "delayed" registration in writing at the time of the actum, even as the bishop of Transylvania. This means that the various tasks in the late 12th century were not always linked to the position, but to the person. Paul knew the case personally, so he issued the document upon the order of Béla III.

The considerable number of witnesses shows that the mentioned persons participated in the various stages of the legal act (testimony, border crossing, etc.). The document was issued after the fact (perhaps years later) and probably not in the presence of the king. it is also possible that the Pécs Chapter issued the diploma instead of the still forming royal chancellery. According to historian László Koszta, the late Marcellus and his widow Froa belonged to that hospes ("guest") community of Walloon, Flemish or Lorrain origin, who settled down in Pécs and the surrounding area in the 1160–1170s. In many cases, the document reflects a French influence, which may also indicate the location of Paul's studies abroad, and it may be because of the language community that he became the written responsible for the case.

== Sources ==
- Halász, János (2022). "III. Béla 1181-es "írásbeliséget elrendelő" oklevelének historiográfiája és egyes tartalmi kérdései [The historiography and some content issues of King Béla III's diploma (1181) on "ordering clerkly literacy"]". Turul (in Hungarian). 95 (3). Magyar Heraldikai és Genealógiai Társaság: 97–106. ISSN 1216-7258.
- Kubinyi, András (1975). "Királyi kancellária és udvari kápolna Magyarországon a XII. század közepén [Royal Chancery and Court Chapel in Hungary in the Middle of the 12th Century]". Levéltári Közlemények (in Hungarian). 46 (1). National Archives of Hungary: 59–121. ISSN 0024-1512.
- Thoroczkay, Gábor, ed. (2018). Írott források az 1116–1205 közötti magyar történelemről [Written Sources of the Hungarian History between 1116 and 1205] (in Hungarian). Szegedi Középkorász Műhely. ISBN 978-615-80398-3-3.
- Veres, Kristóf György (2019). "A magyar királyi kancellária okleveles gyakorlata 1172 és 1235 között [The institutional practice of the Hungarian royal chancery between 1172 and 1235]". Turul (in Hungarian). 92 (1). Magyar Heraldikai és Genealógiai Társaság: 1–26. ISSN 1216-7258.
