= Byzantine–Hungarian War (1180–1185) =

12th-century war in Europe

Date	Autumn 1180 – autumn 1185
Location	Balkans
Result	Hungarian victory
Territorial changes	Hungary re-captures Croatia, Dalmatia and Syrmia; Serbia and Bosnia are freed from Byzantine sphere of interest

Belligerents
Kingdom of Hungary Grand Principality of Serbia (since 1183); Banate of Bosnia (since 1183)	Byzantine Empire

Commanders and leaders
Béla III; Farkas Gatal; Denis; Maurus Győr Stefan Nemanja; Ban Kulin	Andronikos I Komnenos; Alexios Branas; Andronikos Lapardas

A Byzantine–Hungarian War was fought between Byzantine and Hungarian forces in the Balkans from 1180 to 1185. Taking advantage of the internal conflicts in the Byzantine Empire after Emperor Manuel's death, Béla III of Hungary reoccupied Croatia, Dalmatia and Syrmia, restoring Hungarian suzerainty over these territories after fourteen years.

== Background ==
During the reign of Emperor Manuel I Komnenos (r. 1143–1180), the Byzantine Empire was a constant threat to Hungary's sovereignty along the southern border. The Balkans served as a buffer zone between the two powers. The vassal state Grand Principality of Serbia rebelled in 1149, forcing Manuel to interrupt his preparations for an invasion of Southern Italy and invade Serbia in 1149. Manuel's active foreign policy in the Balkans escalated brief wars between the Byzantine Empire and the Kingdom of Hungary in the period between 1149 and 1155, during the reign of Géza II of Hungary.

Géza II died in May 1162. His fifteen-year-old son Stephen III ascended the Hungarian throne, but his two uncles, anti-kings Ladislaus II (1162–1163) then Stephen IV (1163), who had joined the court of the Byzantine Empire and enjoyed the support of Manuel, challenged his right to the crown. A civil war broke out between Stephen III and his uncles. The army of Stephen III, along with German mercenaries, defeated his uncle Stephen IV in June 1163. Although Stephen III remained the only legitimate monarch in Hungary, the civil war was followed by a large-scale Byzantine invasion of Hungary. Stephen III was obliged to renounce Syrmia (Sirmium) in favor of the Byzantine Empire, but only after Manuel promised that he would never support his uncle Stephen IV. Clashes and border conflicts between Hungary and the Byzantium lasted until 1167, when Stephen III had to renounce Dalmatia, Croatia and Syrmia to the Byzantine Empire. Prior to that, these lands belonged to the appanage of Stephen's younger brother Béla, who was sent to Constantinople in accordance with the peace treaty between Stephen III and Manuel. Béla ascended his brother in the Hungarian throne in 1172. Before his departure, he pledged that he would never make war against the Byzantine Empire. Until Manuel's death, no further confrontation took place between the two countries; Béla even sent reinforcements to Manuel to help him fight against the Seljuks in 1176.

== Byzantine–Hungarian war ==
The death of Emperor Manuel on 24 September 1180 left the Byzantine Empire in an extremely difficult political situation. His eleven-year-old son Alexios II Komnenos succeeded him, but the imperial power was held by regents, his mother Maria of Antioch and the prōtosebastos Alexios Komnenos (a namesake cousin of the child monarch). The following period was characterized by internal struggles within the elite, while Manuel's daughter Maria Komnene (once engaged to Béla III) also contested her half-brother's right to the crown.

=== Recovery of the lost provinces ===
Taking advantage of the internal conflicts in the Byzantine Empire, Béla III launched a campaign in the autumn of 1180 in order to restore the Hungarian suzerainty in Dalmatia. The king entrusted his palatine Farkas Gatal to lead the Hungarian troops till the Adriatic Sea. Within six months, Béla had restored his suzerainty in Dalmatia, but no detailed contemporaneous accounts of the events exist. The citizens of Split and Zadar also accepted Béla's suzerainty in late 1180 or early 1181. The latter revolted against the Venetian rule, supported by the presence of the Hungarian army. Historian John V. A. Fine wrote that Béla retook suzerainty of Dalmatia "seemingly without bloodshed and with imperial consent", because the Byzantine authorities preferred that Béla rule the province rather than the Republic of Venice. Ferenc Makk refused this standpoint, because the "Byzantium was not threatened by Venice in Dalmatia at the time", for instance, Doge Orio Mastropiero unsuccessfully attempted to regain Zadar from the Hungarians years later, in 1187. Nevertheless, Béla indeed retook suzerainty of Dalmatia seemingly without serious confrontation. Farkas Gatal resided in Zadar in March 1181. Because of the internal struggle, the Byzantine Empire was unable to mount serious resistance. In addition, Kilij Arslan II, the Seljuk Sultan of Rûm seized most of the southern coast of Asia Minor from the empire around the same time.

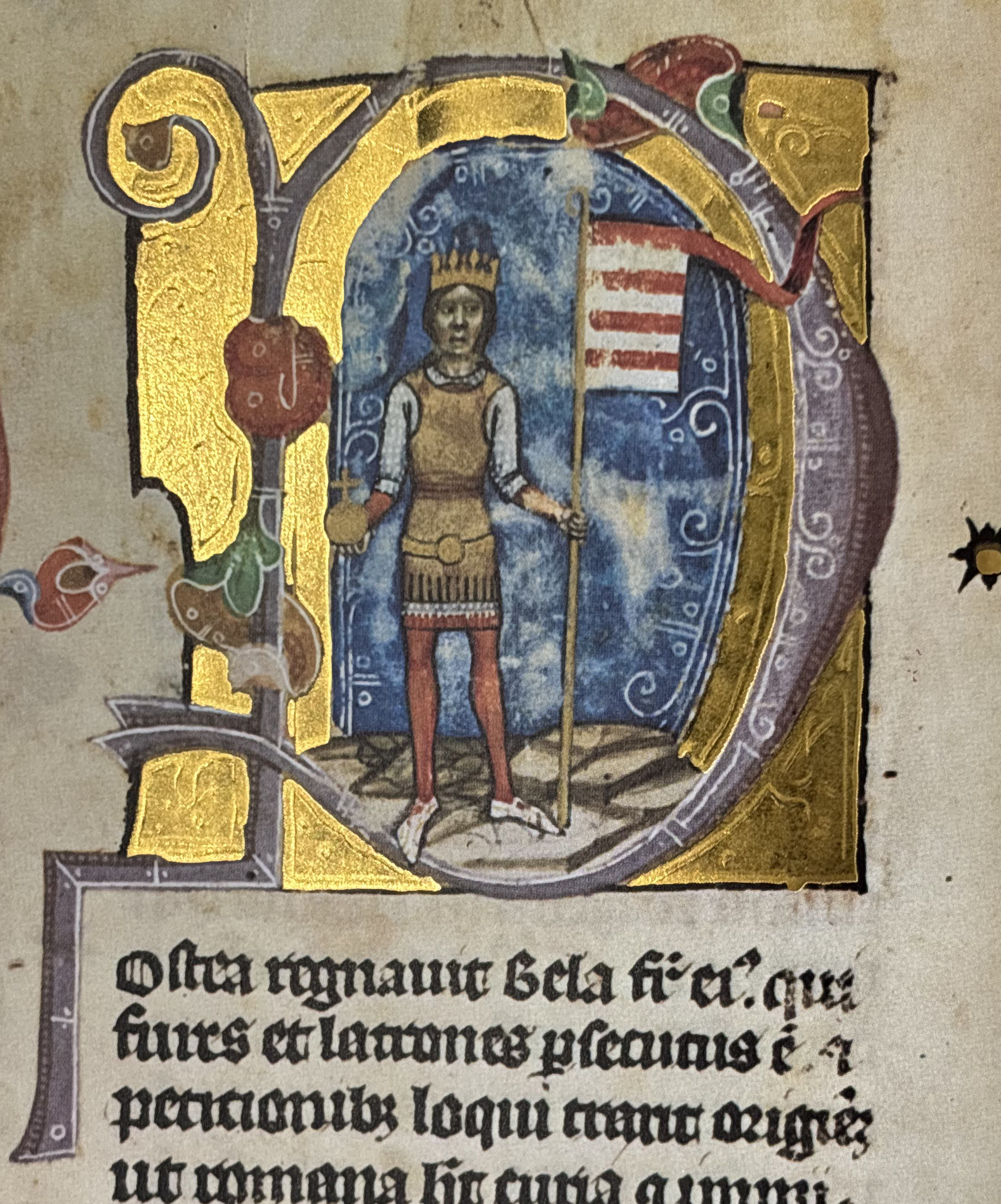
King Béla III of Hungary (Illuminated Chronicle)

Béla III immediately intended to reorganize the royal administration in Croatia and Dalmatia. His confidant Denis was installed as Ban of Slavonia in 1181. He was also styled as "Ban of Croatia and Dalmatia", then "governor of maritime parts" in 1183, and "Ban of Maritime Provinces" (Croatian: Primorje, Hungarian: Tengermellék) in 1184, which reflect he had jurisdiction over all Croatia and Dalmatia, and his suzerainty extended until the river Danube. Historian Judit Gál considered after Béla recovered Dalmatia, Hungary's territories beyond the Drava were initially consolidated under a single ban after 1183. Simultaneously with Denis' appointment, Maurus Győr was installed as "governor of the whole coastal province" already by February 1181, when resided in Zadar and was involved in a verdict about some possession rights. Accordingly, Maurus functioned as the deputy of Denis, supervising the coastal territories along the Adriatic Sea. King Béla also sought to re-establish pro-Hungarian ecclesiastical organization in Dalmatia: the 13th-century chronicler Thomas the Archdeacon narrates that the monarch wished the burghers of Split to elect a Hungarian national as archbishop of Split in order to fill the dignity. However, the citizens refused to elect the king's protegee and physician Peter and petitioned to the Holy See. In 1181, Pope Alexander III urged Béla III to respect the burghers of Split's privilege to free elect of their archbishop. Under the pressure of the Hungarians, despite the intervention of the Roman Curia, Peter was elected Archbishop of Split by the local citizens in 1185. Nevertheless, Peter already acted as de facto prelate in the previous years, and royal charters in Hungary styled him as Archbishop of Split since 1180.

Simultaneously with the recovery of Croatia and Dalmatia, the Hungarian army marched into Syrmia too, but the details of the reconquest of the province in the Central Balkans are also obscure. Béla's troops seized and ravaged the region of Belgrade and Barancs (now Braničevo in Serbia). Thereafter, the Hungarian army advanced as far as to the Morava Valley. It took place in the summer of 1181 at the latest. Andronikos Komnenos, marching to Constantinople with an army, accused Maria of Antioch, the mother and regent of the young Byzantine Emperor, Alexios II, of inciting Béla—her brother-in-law—to ravage the region of Belgrade and Barancs in May 1182, implying that Béla had by that time occupied Syrmia.

=== Interference in the Byzantine civil war ===
After gaining control of Constantinople and the order to massacre of the Latins in the spring of 1182, Andronikos Komnenos had poisoned Maria Komnene and her husband Renier of Montferrat, while the dowager empress Maria of Antioch was arrested and imprisoned. The empress tried to seek help from her brother-in-law Béla III, according to the verdict. Andronikos had Alexios II sign the order for his mother's execution and Maria was strangled in her prison in late 1182.

Taking advantage of the emerging anarchy in the Byzantine Empire, Béla advanced as far as Niš (Naissos) and Sofia (Serdica) in the first half of 1183. During the campaign, the Hungarian king allied with the Serbs of Rascia and the Banate of Bosnia, who struggled for their independence and the usurpation of Andronikos Komnenos freed them from subordination to the Byzantine Empire under the leadership of Stefan Nemanja and Ban Kulin, respectively. During the siege, Niš was completely destroyed. In Serdica, Béla III seized the casket containing the relics of Saint Ivan of Rila, and ordered it "to be transported with great honors to his land and to be laid down with honor in the church" of Esztergom, according to the saint's Life from the Sofia Prologue. Ferenc Makk considered that Béla withdrew from the regions south of the Danube, but historian Paul Stephenson argued that Béla preserved these lands. According to the Byzantine historian Niketas Choniates, the Byzantine generals Alexios Branas and Andronikos Lapardas were fighting against the Hungarian troops in the vicinity of Niš in the autumn of 1183. The two generals achieved limited successes along the defense line of the Balkan Mountains passes and plausibly forced the Hungarians to retreat till the river Sava. The Byzantine infighting, however, eventually drove both generals to the interior of the empire within a short time. For instance, Alexios Branas left the Balkans for Anatolia in the spring of 1184.

Some Hungarian historians – for instance, József Deér and Gyula Moravcsik – claimed that Béla III conducted the 1183 campaign in order to defend and support the interests of the late Manuel's family – Alexios II and Maria of Antioch – against the usurper Andronikos Komnenos. Accordingly, the Hungarian monarch had no intention to expand his realm at the expense of the Byzantine Empire and Béla voluntarily retreat from the central Balkans after the execution of Maria. Ferenc Makk emphasized this theory is not corroborated by the sources. Maria of Antioch sought Béla's direct assistance against Andronikos, encouraging him to devastate Belgrade and Barancs. As her verdict stated, Maria would have been willing to recognize Hungarian territorial claims on certain Byzantine lands in exchange for their support against the usurper. Andronikos Komnenos murdered Emperor Alexios II in September or October 1183, becoming sole ruler of the empire. The contemporaneous Eustathius of Thessalonica writes that Andronikos's opponents sent letters to many monarchs, including Béla III, urging them to attack Andronikos.

=== End of the conflict ===
No clashes between Hungary and the Byzantium took place in 1184. There is a scholarly theory that Béla III had signed an armistice with Andronikos in that year, but Makk argued the temporary successes of Alexios Branas forced the Hungarians to sort out their queues due to increased losses and costs. According to Ansbert and other Western European chroniclers, Béla invaded the Byzantine Empire in early 1185. The Norman invasion of the Byzantine Empire led by William II of Sicily took place around the same time, which made the internal political situation of the tyrannically ruling emperor Andronikos impossible. The Hungarians marched into Niš and Sofia again, towards the valley of Morava. According to some scholars, Béla wanted to seize the imperial crown for himself during his 1185 campaign, and proposed a marriage to Theodora Komnene, the widow of Andronikos Lapardas, who lived in a monastery (Béla's first wife, Agnes of Antioch died in 1184). The synod at Constantinople did not contribute to the marriage and did not release Theodora from her nun's vow.

By the summer of 1185, Constantinople was itself threatened by the Norman invasion, which sparked a rebellion in the city, resulting the dethronement and lynching of Andronikos Komnenos in September. He was succeeded by Isaac II Angelos, who began negotiations with Béla III and sent his envoys to propose a marriage between him and Béla's ten-year-old daughter Margaret. Consequently, Béla III signed a peace treaty with Isaac II. The new Byzantine emperor married Margaret in January 1186 at the latest, and Béla granted the region of Niš and Barancs to Isaac as his daughter's dowry. The relics of Saint Ivan of Rila were also returned to Sofia on this occasion. In exchange, the emperor officially renounced Dalmatia and Syrmia. Makk considered Béla's failed proposal to marry Theodora took place after the peace treaty only. Due to the Byzantine–Hungarian alliance, Isaac II successfully repelled the Norman invasion at the Battle of Demetritzes in November 1185.

== Aftermath ==
Due to the establishment of Serbia and Bosnia as independent powers in the Balkans, in addition to the successful uprising of Asen and Peter from 1185 to 1187 which led to the reestablishment of the Bulgarian Empire, the Byzantine Empire was gradually pushed out of the lower Danube, which also made the Hungarian–Byzantine confrontation of the 12th century obsolete. In the subsequent decade, Béla supported the political aspirations of Isaac II.

== Sources ==
- B. Szabó, János (2013). Háborúban Bizánccal. Magyarország és a Balkán a 11–12. században [War with the Byzantium. Hungary and the Balkans in the 11–12th Century] (in Hungarian). Corvina. ISBN 978-963-13-6150-6.
- Curta, Florin (2006). Southeastern Europe in the Middle Ages, 500–1250. Cambridge University Press. ISBN 978-0-521-89452-4.
- Fine, John Van Antwerp Jr. (1991). The Early Medieval Balkans: A Critical Survey from the Sixth to the Late Twelfth Century. Michigan: The University of Michigan Press. ISBN 0-472-08149-7.
- Gál, Judit (2020). Dalmatia and the Exercise of Royal Authority in the Árpád-Era Kingdom of Hungary. Arpadiana III., Research Centre for the Humanities. ISBN 978-963-416-227-8.
- Makk, Ferenc (1989). The Arpads and the Comneni: Political Relations between Hungary and Byzantium in the 12th Century. Budapest, Hungary: Akadémiai Kiadó. ISBN 978-9-63-055268-4.
- Stephenson, Paul (2000). Byzantium's Balkan Frontier: A Political Study of the Northern Balkans, 900–1204. Cambridge: Cambridge University Press. ISBN 978-0-521-77017-0.
- Treadgold, Warren (1997). A History of the Byzantine State and Society. Stanford University Press. ISBN 0-8047-2630-2.
