= Waghäusel =

- Town
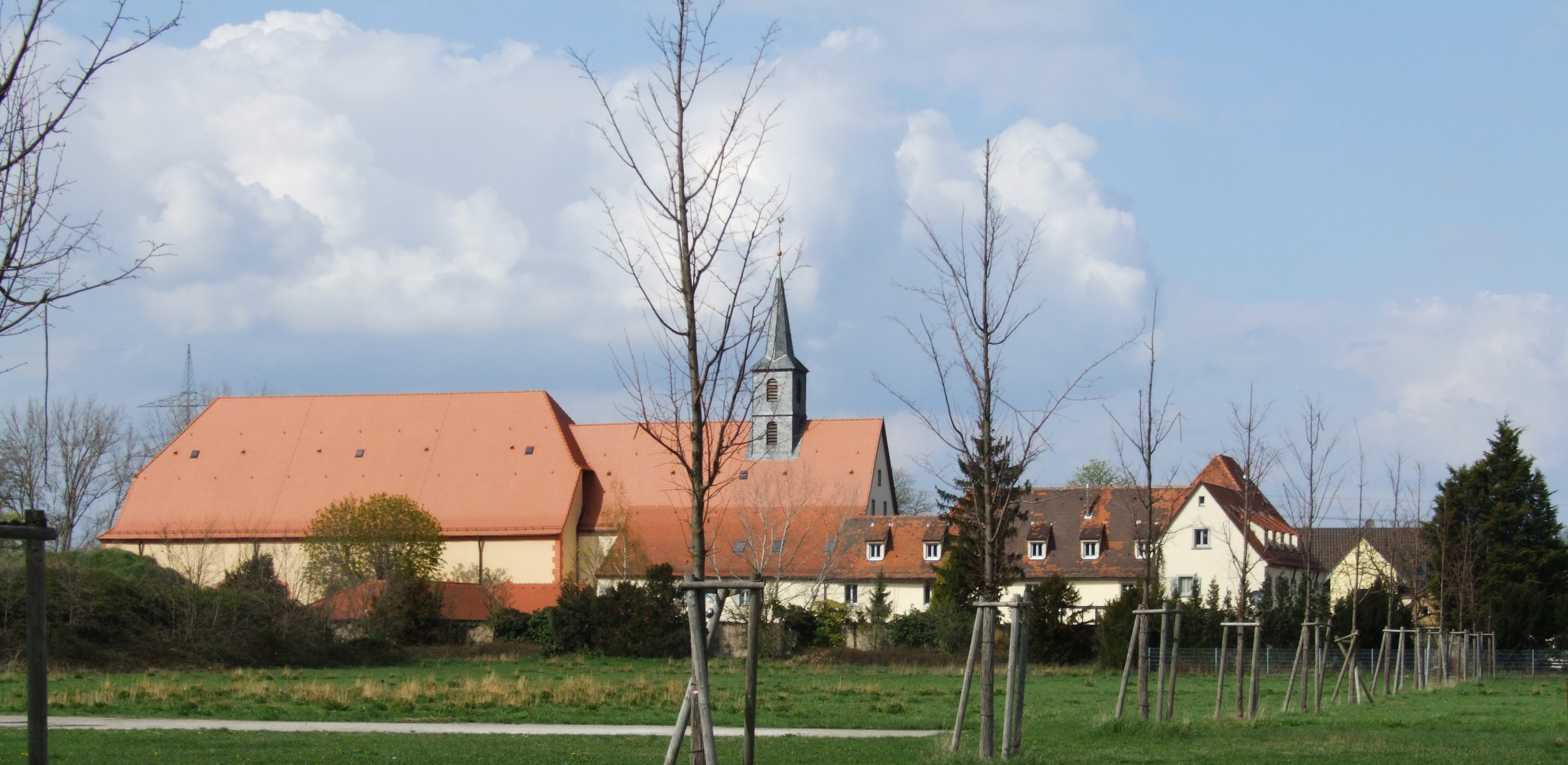
- Monastery

- Coat of arms

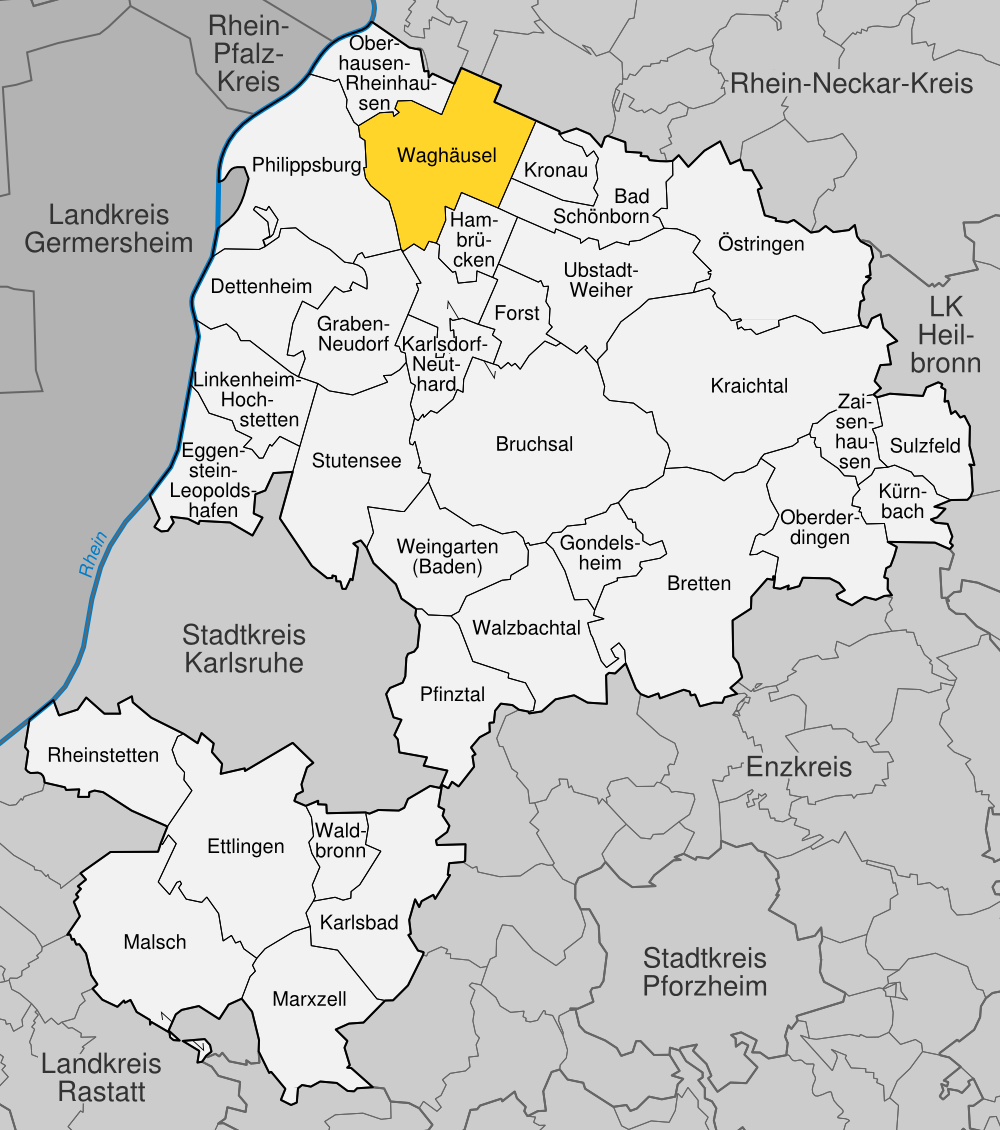
- Location of Waghäusel within Karlsruhe district
- Interactive map of Waghäusel
- Location within Germany Location within Baden-Württemberg
- Coordinates: 49°15′N 8°31′E
- Country: Germany
- State: Baden-Württemberg
- Admin. region: Karlsruhe
- District: Karlsruhe

Government
  - Mayor (2022–30): Thomas Deuschle (CDU)

Area
  - Total: 42.84 km^{2} (16.54 sq mi)
- Elevation: 104 m (341 ft)

Population (2025-12-31)
  - Total: 22,301
  - Density: 520.6/km^{2} (1,348/sq mi)
- Time zone: UTC+01:00 (CET)
  - Summer (DST): UTC+02:00 (CEST)
- Postal codes: 68743–68753
- Dialling codes: 07254
- Vehicle registration: KA
- Website: www.waghaeusel.de

Waghäusel (German pronunciation: [ˈvak.hɔʏzl̩], locally [ˈvak.hɔusɛl]; South Franconian: Woghaisl) is a town located in the Rhine valley in the south-western state of Baden-Württemberg, Germany. Waghäusel consists of 3 townships which are the core town (1236 residents), Kirrlach (9347 residents), and Wiesental (9596 residents) [as of March 31, 2006]. Wiesental and Kirrlach are located on Bertha Benz Memorial Route.

Among the three townships, Wiesental occupies the largest land area of 21.2 km² followed by Kirrlach with 19.4 km² and the core town with 0.22 km².

== Sights ==
- Pilgrimage church of Mary with monastery
- Baroque castle "Eremitage"
- Daytaller House in Kirrlach
- Gothic wood carved altar in the Catholic Church of Kirrlach
- Old-German wine tavern in Kirrlach (liquor license since July 15, 1700)

== International relations ==
Waghäusel is twinned with the following towns:

- Caldicot, Wales
- Flattach, Austria
- Szigetújfalu, Hungary
