= Battle of Sirmium =

Battle in 1167

- Part of the Byzantine–Hungarian War (1162–1167)
- Map of the Battle of Sirmium depicting Hungarian and Byzantine troop deployments (by József Bánlaky)
Date	July 8, 1167
Location	Sirmium, Byzantine Empire (now Serbia)
Result	Byzantine victory
Territorial changes	Byzantine control of the western Balkans.

Belligerents
Byzantine Empire; Grand Principality of Serbia, as a Byzantine vassal state	Kingdom of Hungary

Commanders and leaders
Andronikos Kontostephanos; Andronikos Lapardas	Dénes, count of Bács

Strength
15,000	15,000

Casualties and losses
Unknown	800 captured thousands killed

The Battle of Sirmium, Battle of Semlin or Battle of Zemun (Hungarian: zimonyi csata) was fought on July 8, 1167 between the Byzantine Empire, and the Kingdom of Hungary. The Byzantines achieved a decisive victory, forcing the Hungarians to sue for peace on Byzantine terms. The battle consolidated Byzantine control of the western Balkans.

== Background ==
From the mid 11th century, the Kingdom of Hungary had been expanding its territory and influence southwards, with a view to annexing the regions of Dalmatia and Croatia. This, and Hungarian alliances with the Serbian principalities, was the cause of tension with the Byzantine Empire, centred on Constantinople, which viewed Hungarian expansion as a potential threat to Byzantine dominance in the Balkans. The Byzantines and Hungarians launched a number of invasions of each other's territory, and the Byzantines regularly aided pretenders to the Hungarian throne. Friction and outbreaks of open warfare between the Byzantines and Hungarians reached a peak in the 1150s and 1160s.

The Byzantine emperor Manuel I Komnenos attempted to achieve a diplomatic and dynastic settlement with the Kingdom of Hungary. In 1163, under the terms of an existing peace treaty, King Stephen III's younger brother Béla was sent to Constantinople to be raised under the personal tutelage of the emperor himself. As Manuel’s relative (Manuel's mother was a Hungarian princess) and the fiancé of his daughter, Béla became a Despotes (a title newly created for him) and in 1165 he was named as an heir to the throne, taking the name Alexios. Since he was also the heir to the Hungarian throne, a union between the two states was a distinct possibility. But in 1167, King Stephen refused to give Manuel control of the former Byzantine territories allocated to Béla-Alexios as his appanage; this directly led to the war that ended with the Battle of Sirmium.

In 1167, bad health prevented Manuel from taking to the field in person, therefore he appointed his nephew Andronikos Kontostephanos, the Megas Doux, to the command of his field army, with orders to bring the Hungarian army to battle.

== Battle ==
During the early summer of 1167, the Byzantine army under Andronikos Kontostephanos managed to bring a large Hungarian force to battle near Sirmium. The most detailed surviving description of the battle was made by the Byzantine historian John Kinnamos.

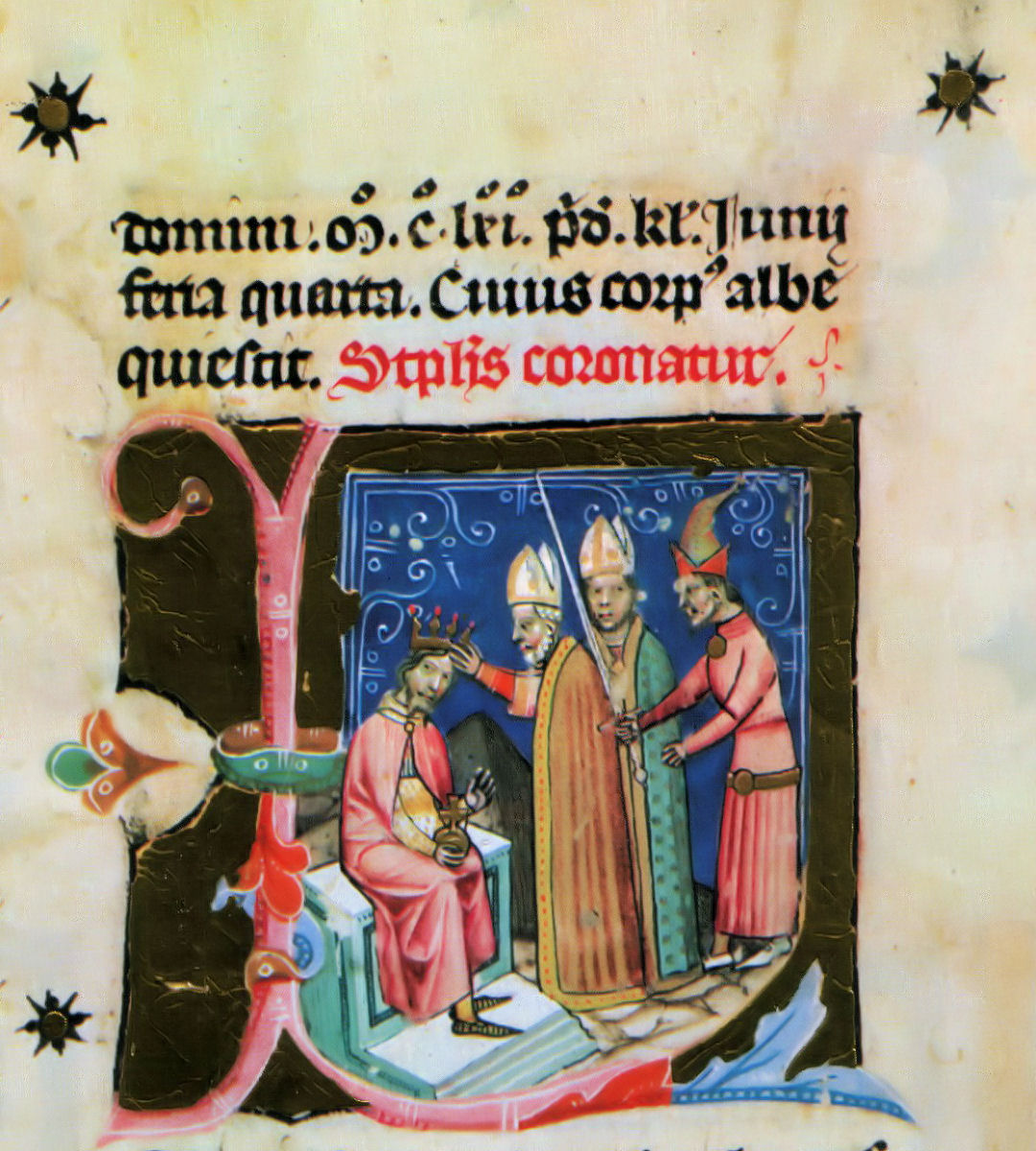
Coronation of King Stephen III of Hungary

The Byzantine army was composed of one-third foreign and two-thirds native units. According to John Kinnamos, involved in the battle were Turks, Cumans, Varangian Guard, Italian mercenary lancers from Lombardy, Serbian infantry and cavalry, German mercenaries, and Western mercenary knights. It was arrayed in three divisions, as was the usual practice, at some distance from the river Sava, which was to the rear. The main battle line was shielded by a screen of horse archers – Turks and Cumans – and some western mercenary knights, who had made up the vanguard of the army. The centre, which had constituted the rearguard on the march, was commanded by Kontostephanos himself, and consisted of the imperial guards units, including the Varangians and Hetaireiai, units of Italian mercenaries from Lombardy (probably lancers) and an allied unit of 500 armoured Serbian infantry. Unusually, Kontostephanos also had the emperor's companions (the oikeoi or household troops) under his command.

The left wing, which had been the second division on the march, was composed of regular Byzantine and allied units arrayed in four taxiarchies or 'brigades' under Demetrios and George Branas, Tatikios Aspietes and Kogh Vasil. On the right – the third division on the march – were placed the elite Byzantine units and German mercenaries, together with some Turkish units. This division was commanded by the chartoularios Andronikos Lampardas and, probably, John Kontostephanos the brother of the megas doux. Three taxiarchies of infantry and archers, with a number of heavily armoured Turks (probably also infantry), were drawn up behind the centre in reserve. Close to each wing division, and following standard Byzantine practice, were placed units to cover the Byzantine flanks or to outflank the enemy and attack their rear should the opportunity arise (prokoursatores on the right flank and defensores on the left - from earlier military treatises).

The Hungarian commander, Dénes, count of Bács (called Dionysios in Byzantine sources), drew his army, which included German allies, up in three divisions in a single broad battle line. Although the Byzantine sources say that he mixed infantry and cavalry without distinction, this most probably reflects a battle order with infantry drawn up in the centre and behind the cavalry, upon which the Hungarians clearly relied for the effectiveness of their attack. Choniates describes the Hungarian army as being composed of knights, archers and light infantry. Contemporary Hungarian armies often lacked infantry and Byzantine sources possibly referred to servants and other camp followers as infantry. The soldiers of the front rank of the Hungarian cavalry are described as being heavily armoured, and mounted on armoured horses.

The battle commenced with the Byzantine horse archers moving forward to skirmish with, and harry, the opposing lines and thereby goad them into mounting a charge, before which they were to retire. This was successful, and the whole Hungarian line surged forward. The Byzantine left wing, with the exception of the brigades led by Kogh Vasil and Tatikios, was immediately pushed back and broke, possibly in feigned flight, towards the river, where it quickly reformed. In the centre and on the Byzantine right, the Hungarian charge was held. The Byzantine right then counter-charged, and at the same time the regrouped Byzantine left-wing units also re-entered the conflict, attacking the Hungarians who were pinned by the two taxiarchies which had not withdrawn. Andronikos Lampardas then led an attack on the troops around the Hungarian commander and brought them to a halt; a deadly melee ensued with the Byzantine heavy cavalry resorting to the use of their fearsome iron maces. The battle had reached a decisive point. Kontostephanos, recognising the crisis of the battle, now deployed his remaining reserves. He counter-attacked in the centre and ordered forward the infantry along the whole front, driving the Hungarian forces back. The enemy divisions then began to break up in disorder and the whole Hungarian army turned to flight.

The Byzantines captured the main Hungarian standard, which was mounted on an oxen-drawn wagon similar to the Italian carroccio. Count Dénes's warhorse was also taken, though the Hungarian commander managed to escape. Many of the fleeing Hungarians were killed or captured by a Byzantine flotilla operating in the river that they needed to cross to get to safety. Five senior Hungarian commanders with the title Župan were captured, along with 800 other soldiers. Over two thousand armours were taken from the dead and countless helmets, shields and swords. The following day the Byzantine army plundered their enemy's abandoned encampment.

== Aftermath ==
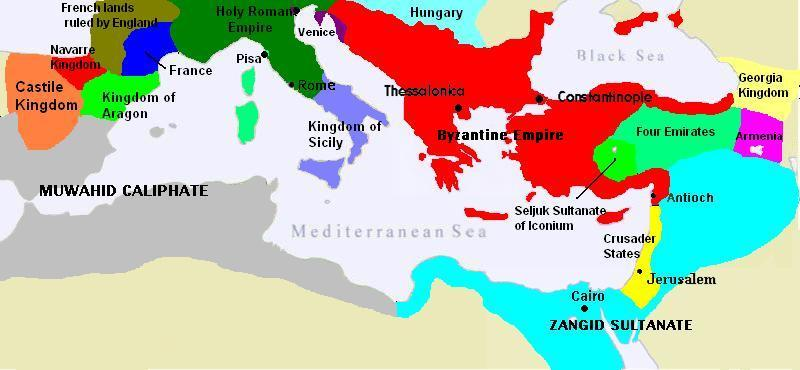
Map of the Mediterranean lands showing Byzantine control of the western Balkans, c. 1170s

The Hungarians sued for peace on Byzantine terms and recognised the empire’s control over Bosnia, Dalmatia, Croatia south of the Krka River as well as the Fruška Gora. They also agreed to provide hostages for good behaviour; to pay Byzantium a tribute and supply troops when requested. The Battle of Sirmium completed Manuel's drive to secure his northern frontier.

When Manuel's own son was born, Béla was deprived of the title despot and his position as heir to the imperial throne. In 1172, Stephen III died and Béla, with the help of Emperor Manuel, seized the throne of the Kingdom of Hungary. Béla had to swear that he would never harm Manuel and he remained loyal to the Empire until Manuel's death, but then he conquered or annexed lands previously held by the Byzantines.

== See also ==
- Komnenian army
- Siege of Braničevo (1154)

== Sources ==
=== Primary ===
- Choniates, Niketas; Magoulias, Harry J. (trans.) (1984). O City of Byzantium: Annals of Niketas Choniates. Detroit, Michigan: Wayne State University Press. ISBN 0-8143-1764-2.
- Kinnamos, John; Brand, Charles M. (trans.) (1976). Deeds of John and Manuel Comnenus. New York, New York: Columbia University Press. ISBN 0-231-04080-6.

=== Secondary ===
- Birkenmeier, John W. (2002). The Development of the Komnenian Army: 1081–1180. Leiden, The Netherlands: Brill. ISBN 90-04-11710-5.
- Haldon, John (2001). The Byzantine Wars: Battles and Campaigns of the Byzantine Era. Stroud, Gloucestershire: Tempus. ISBN 0-7524-1795-9.
- Makk, Ferenc (1989). The Árpáds and the Comneni: Political Relations between Hungary and Byzantium in the 12th century (Translated by György Novák). Akadémiai Kiadó. ISBN 963-05-5268-X.
- Stephenson, Paul (2000). Byzantium's Balkan Frontier: A Political Study of the Northern Balkans, 900–1204. Cambridge University Press. ISBN 978-0-521-02756-4.
- Treadgold, Warren T. (1997). A History of the Byzantine State and Society. Stanford, California: Stanford University Press. ISBN 9780804726306.
