= Szigetújfalu =

- Coat of arms

- Location of Szigetújfalu in Hungary
- Coordinates: 47°14′6″N 18°55′23″E
- Country: Hungary
- Region: Central Hungary
- County: Pest
- Subregion: Ráckevei
- Rank: Village

Area
  - Total: 10.83 km^{2} (4.18 sq mi)

Population (1 January 2008)
  - Total: 2,071
  - Density: 191.2/km^{2} (495.3/sq mi)
- Time zone: UTC+1 (CET)
  - Summer (DST): UTC+2 (CEST)
- Postal code: 2319
- Area code: +36 24
- KSH code: 22114
- Website: www.szigetujfalu.hu

Szigetújfalu is a village in Pest county, Hungary.

== Twin towns – sister cities ==
- Waghäusel, Germany
