= Répcevis =

- Flag Coat of arms

- Location of Győr-Moson-Sopron county in Hungary

- Location of Répcevis
- Coordinates: 47.44369°N 16.67243°E
- Country: Hungary
- County: Győr-Moson-Sopron

Area
  - Total: 6.09 km^{2} (2.35 sq mi)

Population (2004)
  - Total: 392
  - Density: 64.36/km^{2} (166.7/sq mi)
- Time zone: UTC+1 (CET)
  - Summer (DST): UTC+2 (CEST)
- Postal code: 9475
- Area code: 99

Répcevis is a village in Győr-Moson-Sopron county, Hungary.
