= Zemun fortress =

Medieval ruins in Belgrade, Serbia

Zemun fortress Земунска тврђава
- Zemun; Serbia
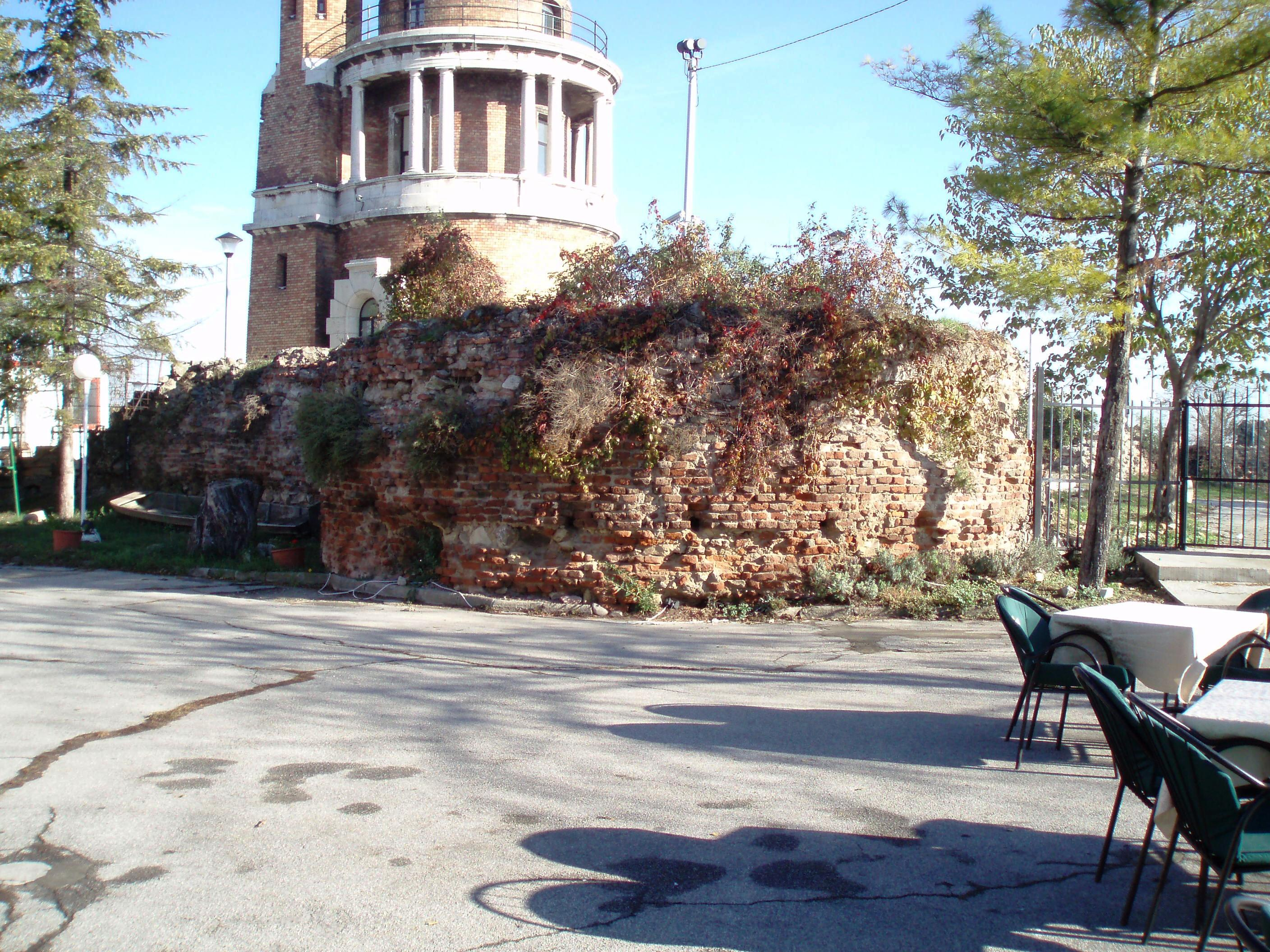
- Remains of the walls

Site information
- Open to the public: Yes

Location
- Coordinates: 44.8483°N 20.4098°E

Site history
- Built: 9th century
- Materials: Stone

The Zemun fortress is a fortification located on a hill in Zemun in Belgrade.

== History ==
Zemun's medieval walls were built on top of the old Celtic, and then Roman town of Taurunum. The medieval walls are believed to be built during the time of the height of the Byzantine Empire, from Constantine I to Justinian I. The first written mentions of the fortress are from the 9th century, and in the late 11th century it suffered great damage during the First Crusade. During the first half of the 12th century, the town is repeatedly mentioned in relation to Byzantine–Hungarian clashes. John Kinnamos mentions that in 1127 the Hungarians captured the Belgrade Fortress, stripping its materials and using stone to build the Zemun fortress. A few decades later, Manuel I Komnenos took Zemun, and reversed the process. He took stones off the Zemun walls, transported them to the other side of the riverbank, and refortified Belgrade. The Ottomans additionally destroyed the town in 1397.

In 1411, Sigismund, the Holy Roman Emperor ceded Zemun to despot Stefan Lazarević. In 1441, it came under the possession of Đurađ Branković.

On 11 August 1456, it was here where John Hunyadi, the famous regent of Hungary, succumbed to his wounds during the Siege of Belgrade. As there were far too many unburied corpses of fighters around the tower, a plague hit the army and the regent shared the same fate as his ill soldiers.

The Ottomans capture Zemun in 1521, in a fierce battle against the Serbian regiments under Marko Skoblić. Since the 18th century, Zemun fortress is in ruins.

== Characteristics ==
Today, there are remains of a square citadel, with four large circular towers in the corners. The length of each wall of the citadel is around 45 meters.
