= Cégénydányád =

- Coat of arms

- Location of Cégénydányád in Hungary
- Coordinates: 47°56′N 22°33′E
- Country: Hungary
- County: Szabolcs-Szatmár-Bereg

Area
  - Total: 12.20 km^{2} (4.71 sq mi)

Population (2001)
  - Total: 735
  - Density: 60.25/km^{2} (156.0/sq mi)
- Time zone: UTC+1 (CET)
  - Summer (DST): UTC+2 (CEST)
- Postal code: 4732
- Area code: 44
- Website: www.cegenydanyad.hu

Cégénydányád is a village in Szabolcs-Szatmár-Bereg county, in the Northern Great Plain region of eastern Hungary. It is best known for its wine region.

== Geography ==
It covers an area of 12.2 km^{2} (5 sq mi) and has a population of 735 people (2001).
