= Béla III of Hungary =

King of Hungary and Croatia from 1172 to 1196

Béla III
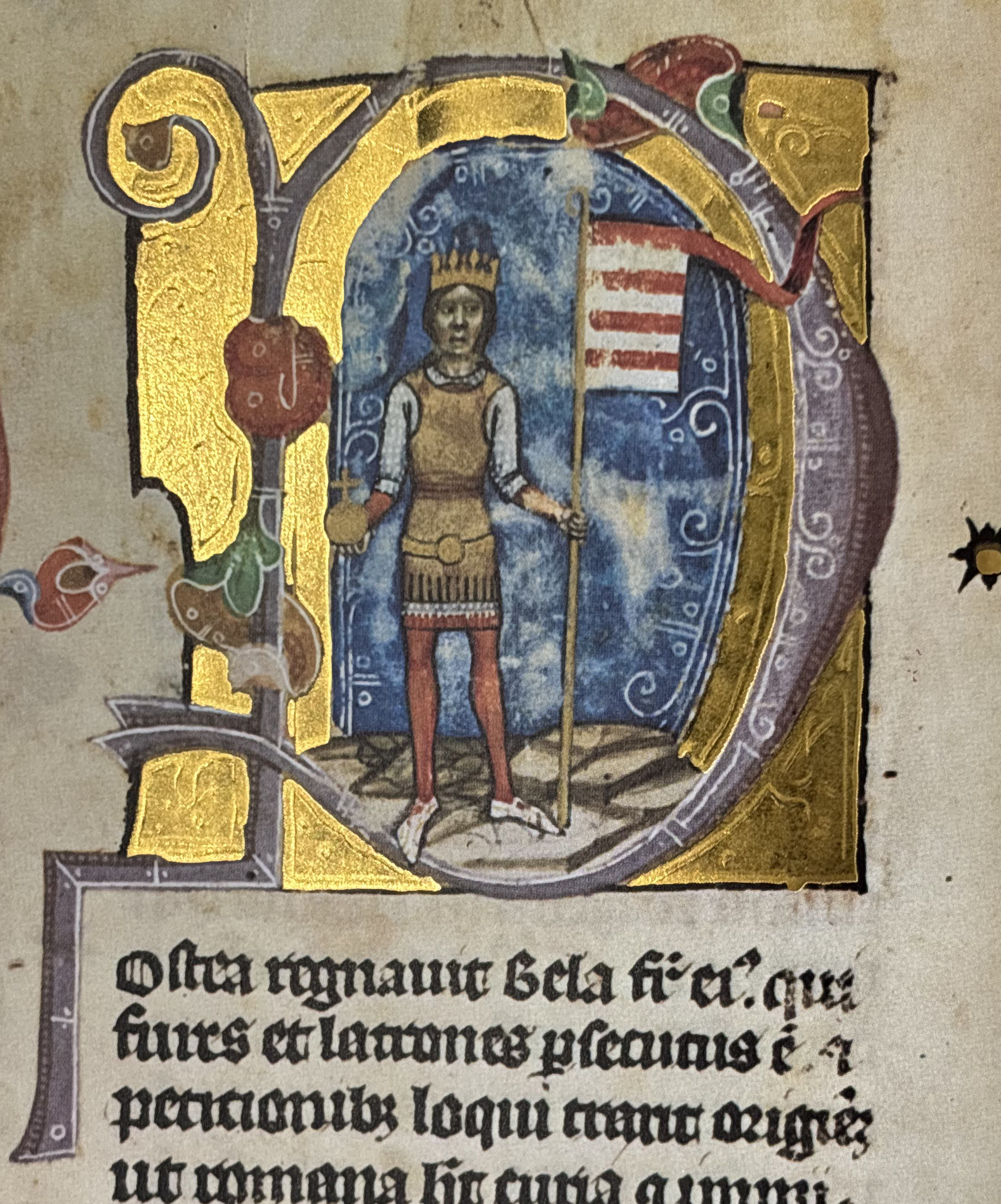
- Bela III from the Illuminated Chronicle

King of Hungary and Croatia
- Reign: 4 March 1172 – 23 April 1196
- Coronation: 13 January 1173, Székesfehérvár
- Predecessor: Stephen III
- Successor: Emeric
- Born: c. 1148
- Died: 23 April 1196 (aged 47–48)
- Burial: Székesfehérvár Basilica reburied at Matthias Church
- Spouses: Agnes of Antioch (m. 1170; died 1184) Margaret of France (m. 1186)
- Issue: Emeric, King of Hungary; Margaret, Byzantine Empress; Andrew II, King of Hungary; Constance, Queen of Bohemia
- Dynasty: Árpád dynasty
- Father: Géza II of Hungary
- Mother: Euphrosyne of Kiev
- Religion: Roman Catholic

Béla III (Hungarian: III. Béla, Croatian: Bela III., Slovak: Belo III.; c. 1148 – 23 April 1196) was King of Hungary and Croatia between 1172 and 1196. He was the second son of King Géza II and Géza's wife, Euphrosyne of Kiev. Around 1161, Géza granted Béla a duchy, which included Croatia, central Dalmatia and possibly Sirmium. In accordance with a peace treaty between his elder brother, Stephen III, who succeeded their father in 1162, and the Byzantine Emperor Manuel I Komnenos, Béla moved to Constantinople in 1163. He was renamed to Alexios, and the emperor granted him the newly created senior court title of despotes. He was betrothed to the Emperor's daughter, Maria. Béla's patrimony caused armed conflicts between the Byzantine Empire and the Kingdom of Hungary between 1164 and 1167, because Stephen III attempted to hinder the Byzantines from taking control of Croatia, Dalmatia and Sirmium. Béla-Alexios, who was designated as Emperor Manuel's heir in 1165, took part in three Byzantine campaigns against Hungary. His betrothal to the emperor's daughter was dissolved after her brother, Alexios, was born in 1169. The emperor deprived Béla of his high title, granting him the inferior rank of kaisar.

Stephen III died on 4 March 1172, and Béla decided to return to Hungary. Before his departure, he pledged that he would never make war against the Byzantine Empire. Although the Hungarian prelates and lords unanimously proclaimed Béla king, Lucas, Archbishop of Esztergom opposed his coronation because of Béla's alleged simony. Finally, the Archbishop of Kalocsa crowned him king on 18 January 1173, with Pope Alexander III's approval. Béla fought with his younger brother, Géza, whom he held in captivity for more than a decade. Taking advantage of the internal conflicts in the Byzantine Empire after Emperor Manuel's death, Béla reoccupied Croatia, Dalmatia and Sirmium between 1180 and 1181. He occupied the Principality of Halych in 1188, but it was lost within two years.

Béla promoted the use of written records during his reign. Hungarian chronicles from the 14th century even state that he was responsible for the establishment of the Royal Chancery. The royal palace built in Esztergom during his reign was the first example of Gothic architecture in Central Europe. He was the wealthiest European monarch of his time, according to a list of his revenues, but the reliability of the list is questioned.

== Early life ==
=== Childhood (c. 1148–1163) ===
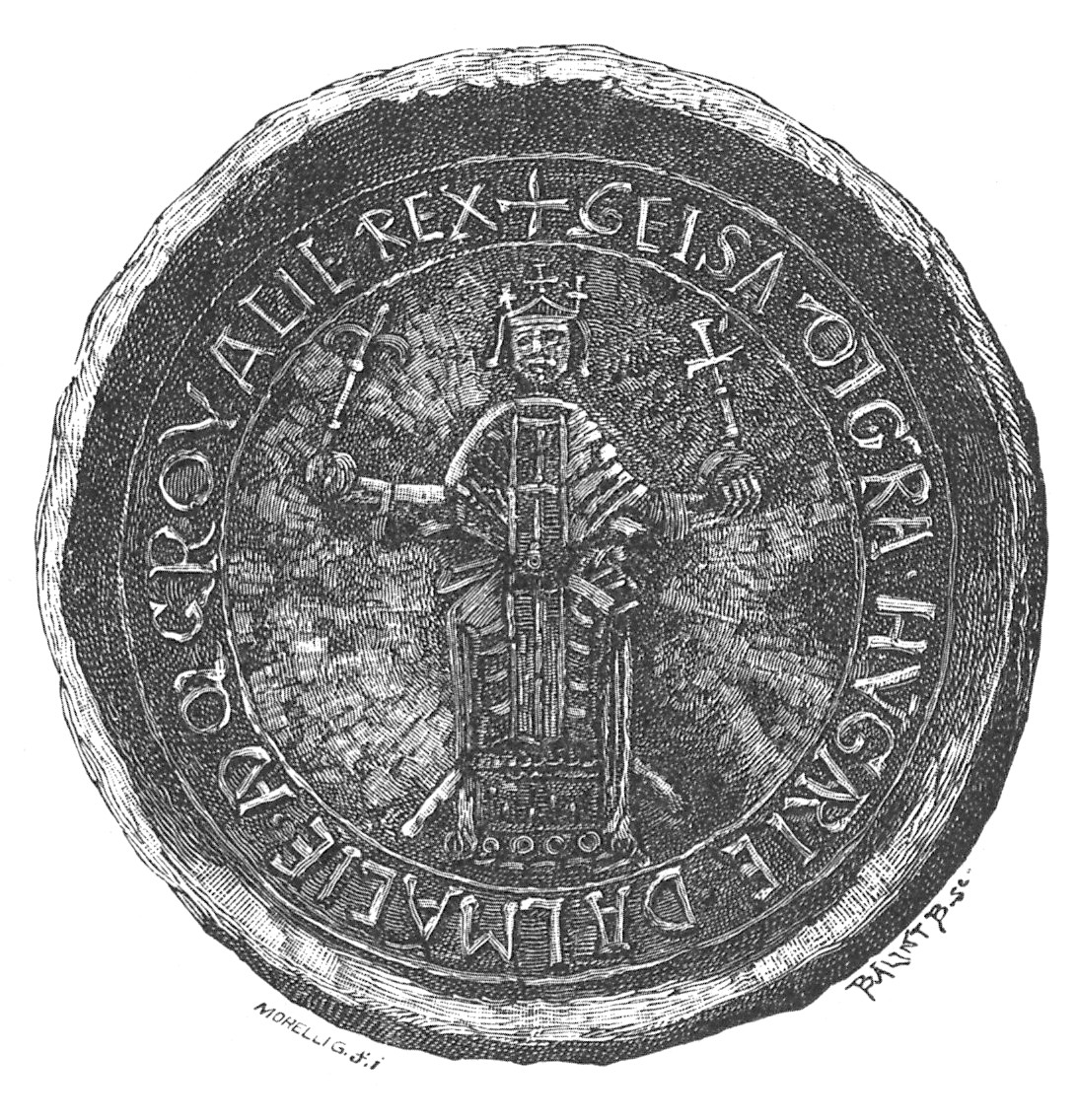
The seal of Béla's father, Géza II of Hungary

Béla was the second son of Géza II of Hungary and Géza's wife, Euphrosyne of Kiev. The date of his birth was not recorded. Studies of his bones show that Béla died in 1196 at around 49 years old, so he must have been born around 1148.

The contemporaneous John Kinnamos's reference to "the territory which his father, while still alive, had apportioned" to Béla shows that Géza II granted a distinct territory as an appanage to his younger son. Béla's patrimony certainly included the central parts of Dalmatia, (which included Šibenik, Split, and Trogir, which had accepted the suzerainty of the Kings of Hungary for decades), because Kinnamos mentioned the province "as Béla's heritage". Historians Ferenc Makk and Gyula Moravcsik agree that Béla also received Croatia from his father. Whether Syrmium was also part of Béla's patrimony, or if he only acquired it after his father's death is subject to scholarly debates. According to historian Warren Treadgold, Béla's patrimony also included Bosnia. The exact date of Géza II's grant cannot be determined, but according to Makk, Béla seems to have received his duchy around 1161.

Géza II, who died on 31 May 1162, was succeeded by his first-born son, Stephen III. Stephen III seems to have confirmed Béla's possession of the duchy, because Kinnamos referred to the land which was "long before granted" to Béla by Géza and Stephen. Shortly after his ascension to the throne, Stephen III was expelled by his uncles, Ladislaus II and Stephen IV. The Byzantine Emperor, Manuel I Komnenos, supported the uncles' takeover, but Stephen III returned to Hungary and regained his crown by force in the middle of 1163. Béla probably remained neutral during his brother's conflict with their uncles, because there is no report of Béla's activities in 1162 and 1163.

In 1163, Emperor Manuel signed a peace treaty with Stephen III, in which he renounced his support of Stephen's opponents. In exchange, Stephen III agreed to send Béla to Constantinople, and to allow the Byzantines to take possession of Béla's duchy. The Emperor also promised that he would betroth his daughter, Maria, to Béla.

"When [Emperor Manuel I] came [to Belgrade] and realized that it was then impossible for [Stephen IV] to rule the Hungarians' land (for already they had hastily installed [Stephen III] son of [Géza II] again), he turned to something else. As stated, he desired with all his might to lay claim to Hungary, which is situated in the midst of the western nations. He therefore intended to unite in marriage Béla, who was [Géza II]'s son after [Stephen III], to his own daughter Maria."

— John Kinnamos: Deeds of John and Manuel Comnenus

=== Despotes Alexios (1163–1169) ===
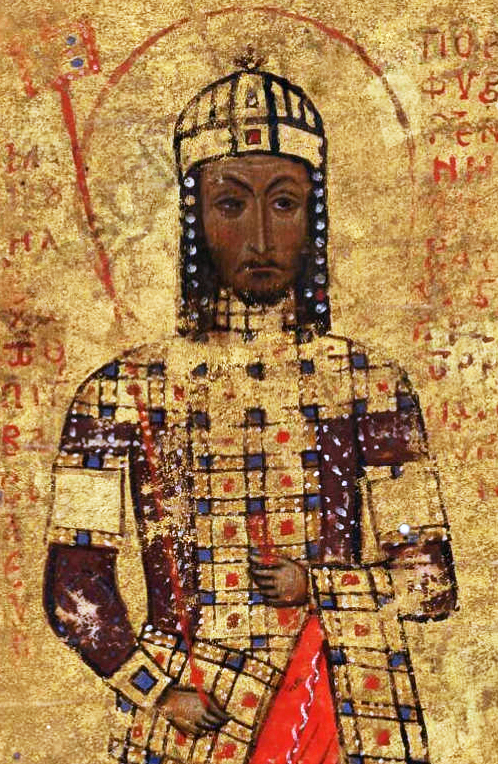
Byzantine Emperor Manuel I Komnenos—Béla-Alexios was the Emperor's designated heir between 1165 and 1169

Emperor Manuel dispatched sebastos George Palaiologos to escort Béla to the Byzantine Empire. Béla arrived in Constantinople around the end of 1163. He was renamed to Alexios, and received the title of despotes ("lord"), which only emperors had used before that time. Béla's betrothal to the emperor's daughter was also officially announced.

Stephen III invaded Syrmium in the summer of 1164. Emperor Manuel led his armies against Stephen, stating that he arrived "not to wage war on the Hungarians but to recover his land for Béla", according to Kinnamos. Béla-Alexios—along with his uncle, Stephen IV, and their distant relative, Stephanos Kalamanos—accompanied the emperor during the campaign. Before long, a new peace treaty was signed, once again forcing Stephen III to renounce Béla's duchy. A Byzantine army occupied Syrmium, which was organized into a Byzantine theme, or district.

Stephen III launched a new invasion against Syrmium in the spring of 1165. Emperor Manuel directed the counter-attack, and Béla accompanied him again. After the imperial army recaptured Zimony (now Zemun in Serbia), Béla persuaded the emperor to prohibit the execution of the Hungarian soldiers who were captured in the fortress. A Byzantine army also occupied Dalmatia. A new peace treaty between Stephen III and Emperor Manuel followed, which confirmed the emperor's suzerainty in Béla's former duchy. Dalmatia and Bosnia were soon converted into Byzantine themes.

Emperor Manuel ceremoniously made his daughter and Béla-Alexios his heirs, and forced the Byzantine notables to swear an oath of fidelity to them in the autumn of 1165. Only the emperor's cousin, Andronikos Komnenos, dared to condemn this act, asking, "What madness is this of the emperor to deem every Roman male unworthy of his daughter's nuptial bed, to choose before all others this foreigner and interloper to be an emperor of the Romans and to sit above all as master?", according to the nearly contemporaneous Niketas Choniates. Béla-Alexios participated in the 1166 Council of Blachernae, together with Emperor Manuel and the Ecumenical Patriarch Luke Chrysoberges. In the spring of 1166, Béla-Alexios accompanied protostrator Alexios Axouch, who led a Byzantine army against Hungary in retaliation for a new Hungarian invasion of Syrmium. On 11 April 1166, although Béla-Alexios and his bride were related to each other, Emperor Manuel confirmed a decision of the Ecumenical Patriarch, which stated that marriages between kin to the seventh degree were void. Manuel even proposed a marriage between his daughter (Béla-Alexios's fiancée) and the new King of Sicily, William II, in the autumn of 1166.

A new war broke out between Hungary and the Byzantine Empire in 1167, because Béla-Alexios "claimed the kingdom" of his brother, according to the contemporaneous Rahewin. Henry of Mügeln also wrote that many Hungarians joined and served the army of Béla-Alexios, stating that "the Kingdom of Hungary belonged to him [Béla-Alexios] by right". On 8 July 1167, the Byzantine army annihilated the Hungarian troops in the Battle of Sirmium. A peace treaty was signed, which put an end to the period of wars between Hungary and the Byzantine Empire, and confirmed the dominion of the Byzantine Empire over central Dalmatia, Bosnia and Syrmium.

=== Kaisar Alexios (1169–1172) ===
Emperor Manuel's wife, Maria of Antioch, gave birth to a son named Alexios on 14 September 1169. The emperor dissolved his daughter's betrothal to Béla-Alexios. The emperor also removed Béla-Alexios's title of despotes, but granted him the inferior rank of kaisar. In the spring of 1170, Béla-Alexios married the emperor's sister-in-law, Agnes of Antioch. The couple went on a pilgrimage to the Holy Land. In Jerusalem, they donated 10,000 bezants to the Knights Hospitaller in compensation for their hospitality. In the charter of grant, Béla-Alexios styled himself "Lord A., Duke of Hungary, Dalmatia and Croatia", ignoring the title that the emperor had recently bestowed upon him.

== Reign ==
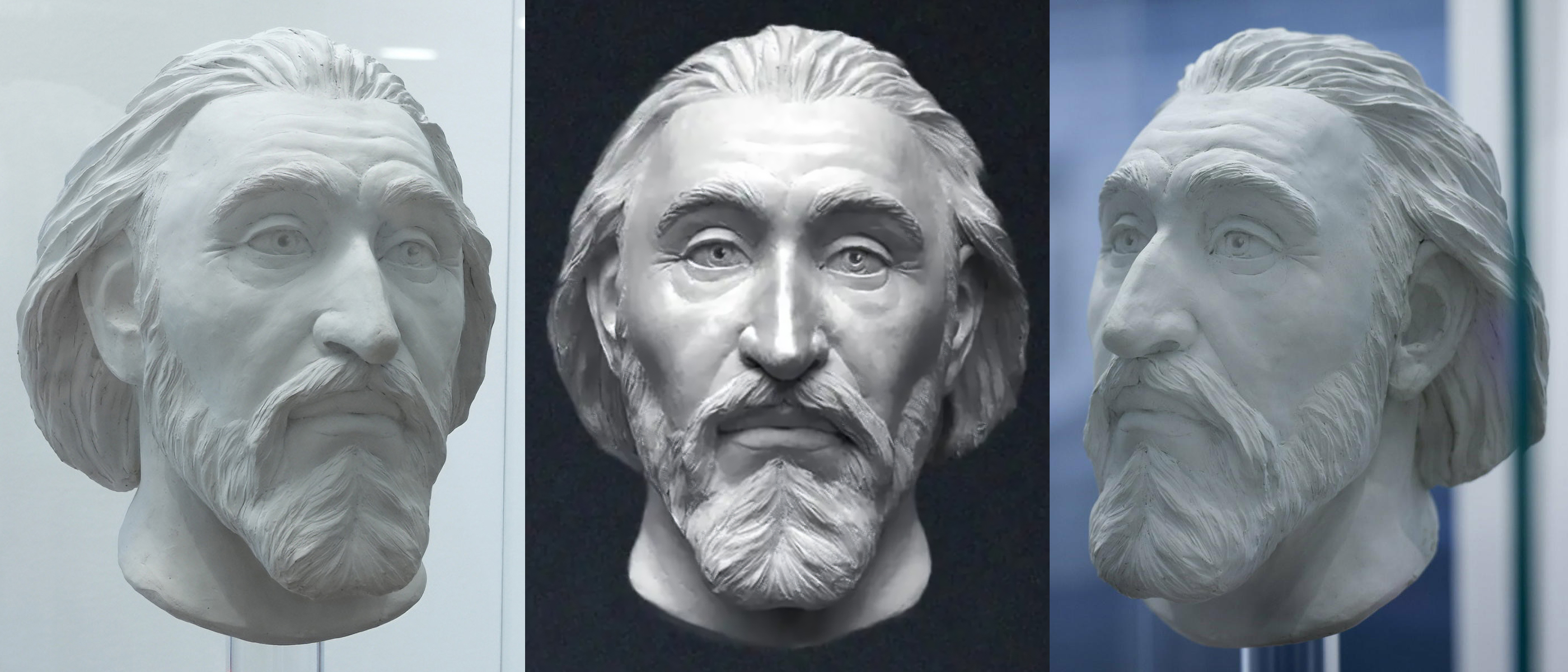
Facial reconstruction of King Béla III of Hungary at an exhibition of the Institute of Hungarian Research (Emese Gábor, 2023)

=== Coronation (1172–1173) ===
Béla's brother, Stephen III, died on 4 March 1172. Arnold of Lübeck, who was staying in Esztergom, recorded a rumor suggesting that Stephen had been poisoned by Béla's supporters, but no other source verifies this hearsay. Stephen III's widow, Agnes, left Hungary, although she was pregnant when her husband died. A Hungarian delegation visited Emperor Manuel and Béla in Sardica (now Sophia in Bulgaria). They demanded that "Béla be dispatched to them as king", because "the principle of justice looked toward him" after his brother's death, according to Kinnamos. Kinnamos also said that Emperor Manuel made Béla king after Béla "promised an oath to observe for the whole course of his life whatever would be beneficial" to the emperor and the Byzantines. A letter written by the Byzantine Emperor Isaac II Angelos in 1196 says that on the same occasion, Béla pledged that he would never support the Serbians if they fought against the Byzantine Empire.

Béla and his wife arrived in Székesfehérvár in late April or early May. Béla was unanimously elected king by the "dignitaries of the Hungarian kingdom", according to a letter written by Pope Alexander III in 1179. However, Béla's coronation was delayed, because Lucas, Archbishop of Esztergom, refused to perform it. The archbishop accused the king of simony, because Béla had given a precious cloak to his delegate. According to a scholarly theory, Archbishop Lucas also feared that the influence of "schismatics" would increase under Béla's rule. Nevertheless, the majority of the barons and prelates remained loyal to Béla. Béla sought the assistance of the Holy See against the Archbishop Lucas. Upon Béla's request, Pope Alexander III authorized the Archbishop of Kalocsa to anoint Béla king and "place the crown on his head". Béla's coronation took place on 18 January 1173. He issued a charter confirming the right of the archbishops of Esztergom to crown the Hungarian monarchs. The unification of the so-called "Greek" and "Latin" crowns into the Holy Crown of Hungary seems to have occurred during his reign.

=== Conflicts (1173–1178) ===
Archbishop Lucas fell out of favor with Béla, and was ignored by him in the first years of his reign. Instead of Lucas, the Archbishop of Kalocsa baptized Béla's first-born son, Emeric, in 1174. However, administering sacraments to members of the royal family had always been the archbishops of Esztergom's job. According to a Bohemian chronicle (Continuatio Gerlaci abbatis Milovicensis), Béla imprisoned his younger brother, Géza, but Géza escaped from prison and fled to Austria in 1174 or 1175. Stephen III's judge royal, Lawrence, accompanied Géza. When Henry Jasomirgott, Duke of Austria, refused to extradite Géza, Béla launched plundering raids into Austria, together with Soběslav II, Duke of Bohemia. Meanwhile, Béla sent reinforcements to Emperor Manuel to help him fight against the Seljuks, but their united forces suffered defeat in the Battle of Myriokephalon on 17 September 1176.

Géza tried to persuade Soběslav II of Bohemia to help him meet Frederick I, Holy Roman Emperor, but Soběslav seized Géza and handed him over to Béla in 1177. Béla once again imprisoned his brother, and he also put their mother, Euphrosyne, in confinement. In retaliation for Soběslav's role in Géza's capture, Emperor Frederick dethroned Soběslav and appointed another member of the Přemyslid dynasty, Frederick, to the position of duke. The Holy Roman Emperor ordered the new Duke of Austria, Leopold V, to storm Bohemia. Béla soon intervened, threatening Leopold V with an invasion, which forced Leopold to leave Bohemia.

=== Expansion and reforms (1178–1194) ===
Béla's long-time favorite, Andrew, Archbishop of Kalocsa, insulted him around 1178. Béla soon deprived him and his supporter, the Provost of Székesfehérvár Chapter, of their offices and seized the Archbishop's revenues. Pope Alexander III punished Béla with ecclesiastic sanctions, but Béla reconciled with Archbishop Lucas of Esztergom, who absolved him and excommunicated Andrew of Kalocsa. The conflict ended with a compromise mediated by the Holy See: Andrew asked Béla to pardon him, and Béla restored him to his position of archbishop.

Upon Béla's invitation, Cistercian monks came from France and set up new Cistercian abbeys at Egres, Zirc, Szentgotthárd and Pilis between 1179 and 1184. In the 1180s, Béla initiated the building of a lofty royal castle and a new cathedral in Esztergom. Nevertheless, he was almost always wandering around the country. According to an inscription on a brick found in Bulkeszi (now Maglić in Serbia), Béla sponsored the baptism of a German "guest settler" in that village.

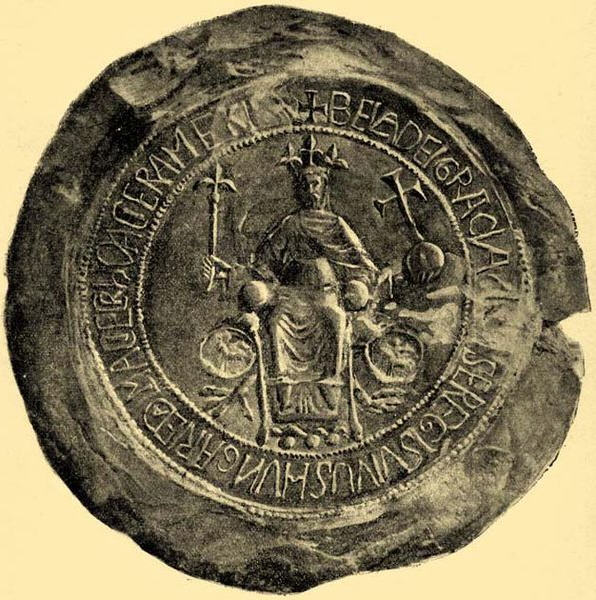
Béla III's seal

In the imperial court of Constantinople, Béla learnt the importance of a well-organized administration. According to the Illuminated Chronicle, Béla "introduced the same form of addressing petitions as was customary in the Roman and imperial court", which suggests that the Royal Chancery began functioning as a separate office during his reign. He emphasized the importance of written records, ordering in 1181 that a charter was to be issued for all transactions proceeding in his presence.

Emperor Manuel I died on 24 September 1180. Within six months, Béla had restored his suzerainty in Dalmatia, but no detailed contemporaneous accounts of the events exist. The citizens of Split "returned to Hungarian lordship" soon after Manuel's death, according to the 13th-century Thomas the Archdeacon. Zadar also accepted Béla's suzerainty in early 1181. Historian John V. A. Fine writes that Béla retook suzerainty of Dalmatia "seemingly without bloodshed and with imperial consent", because the Byzantine authorities preferred that Béla rule the province rather than the Republic of Venice.

The details of the reconquest of Syrmium are also obscure. Andronikos Komnenos accused the mother of the young Byzantine Emperor, Alexios II, of inciting Béla—her brother-in-law—to ravage the region of Belgrade and Barancs (now Braničevo in Serbia) in May 1182, implying that Béla had by that time occupied Syrmium. In the same month, Andronikos Komnenos captured the Dowager Empress and had her murdered by the end of the year. Taking advantage of the emerging anarchy in the Byzantine Empire, Béla advanced as far as Niš and Serdica in the first half of 1183. In Sardica, he seized the casket containing the relics of Saint Ivan of Rila, and ordered it "to be transported with great honors to his land and to be laid down with honor in the church" of Esztergom, according to the saint's Life from the Sofia Prologue. Makk writes that Béla withdrew from the regions south of the Danube, but historian Paul Stephenson says that Béla preserved these lands.

Andronikos Komnenos murdered Emperor Alexios II in late 1183. The contemporaneous Eustathius of Thessalonica writes that Andronikos's opponents sent letters to many monarchs, including Béla III, urging them to attack Andronikos. According to Ansbert and other Western European chroniclers, Béla invaded the Byzantine Empire in early 1185. After Andronikos I fell in September, Béla signed a peace treaty with the new emperor, Isaac II Angelos. Isaac married Béla's daughter, Margaret, and Béla granted the region of Niš and Barancs to Isaac as his daughter's dowry. The relics of Saint Ivan of Rila were also returned to Sardica on this occasion. Béla married Margaret of France, a sister of Philip II of France, in the summer of 1186.

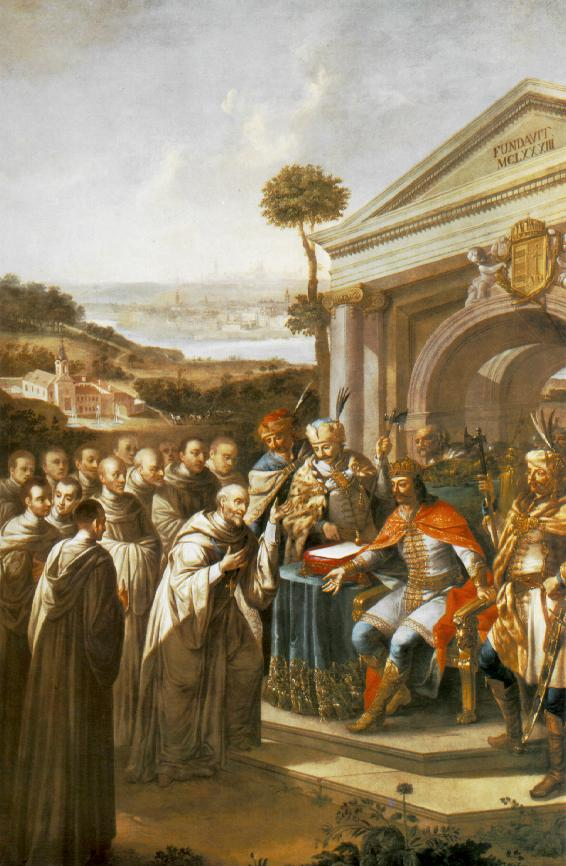
Foundation of the Szentgotthárd Abbey. Painting by Stephan Dorfmeister (c. 1795)

Orio Mastropiero, Doge of Venice, laid siege to Zadar in 1187, but the Venetian fleet could not seize the well-fortified town. Vladimir Yaroslavich, Prince of Halych, fled to Hungary at the end of 1188, because his boyars had rebelled. Roman Mstyslavych, Prince of Vladimir-in-Volhynia, soon occupied Halych, but Béla invaded the principality and expelled him. Instead of restoring Vladimir Yaroslavich to his former position, Béla imprisoned him and granted control of Halych to Andrew, who was Béla's younger son. As a token of his conquest, Béla styled himself as King of Galicia. .

In the summer of 1189, German crusaders marched through Hungary under the command of Frederick I, Holy Roman Emperor. Béla welcomed Frederick, and dispatched a troop to escort the crusaders across the Balkan Peninsula. At Frederick's request, Béla released his imprisoned brother, Géza, who joined the crusaders and left Hungary. Béla mediated a peace treaty between Frederick I and Isaac II, whose mutual distrust had almost caused war between the German crusaders and the Byzantines.

Vladimir Yaroslavich escaped from captivity in early 1189 or 1190. With the assistance of Casimir II of Poland, he expelled Andrew from Halych, and regained control of the principality. In 1191, Béla met his son-in-law, Isaac II, in Philippopolis (now Plovdiv in Bulgaria) and Syrmium, but the results of their negotiations remained unknown. Upon Béla's request, the Holy See approved the canonization of Ladislaus I of Hungary in 1192. Béla invaded Serbia at the beginning of 1193. Isaac II demanded the withdrawal of his troops, and threatened Béla with war. At the same time, Doge Enrico Dandolo attempted to occupy Zadar, but failed. In 1193, Béla granted Modruš County in Croatia to Bartholomew of Krk, a member of the Frankopan family. This is the earliest certain example of an office being granted as a hereditary dignity in the Kingdom of Hungary.

=== Last years (1194–1196) ===
In 1194, Béla appointed his eldest son, Emeric, who had already been crowned as the future king, to administer Croatia and Dalmatia. After a united Bulgarian, Cumanian and Vlach army defeated the Byzantines in the Battle of Arcadiopolis in 1194, Béla was willing to assist the Byzantine Empire. However, his campaign was cancelled, because Béla's son-in-law, Emperor Isaac II, was dethroned by Alexios III Angelos in April 1195. Henry VI, Holy Roman Emperor, was planning to launch a campaign against the Byzantine Empire on behalf of the dethroned emperor, but Béla prohibited his subjects from joining Henry.

Béla took the cross as a token of his desire to lead a crusade to the Holy Land. However, he could not fulfill his oath, because he fell ill and died on 23 April 1196. He was buried in the Székesfehérvár Cathedral. His remains were confidently identified by archeologists during 19th-century excavations, because a contemporaneous source—Richard of London—wrote of Béla's exceptional height. Béla's skeleton shows that he was 190 centimetres (75 in) tall. Béla's remains were reinterred at the Matthias Church in Budapest. The DNA from skeletal remains of Béla and of another presumed member of the Árpád dynasty, scholars propose that the dynasty belonged to Y-haplogroup R1a subclade R-SUR51 > R-ARP.

== Family ==
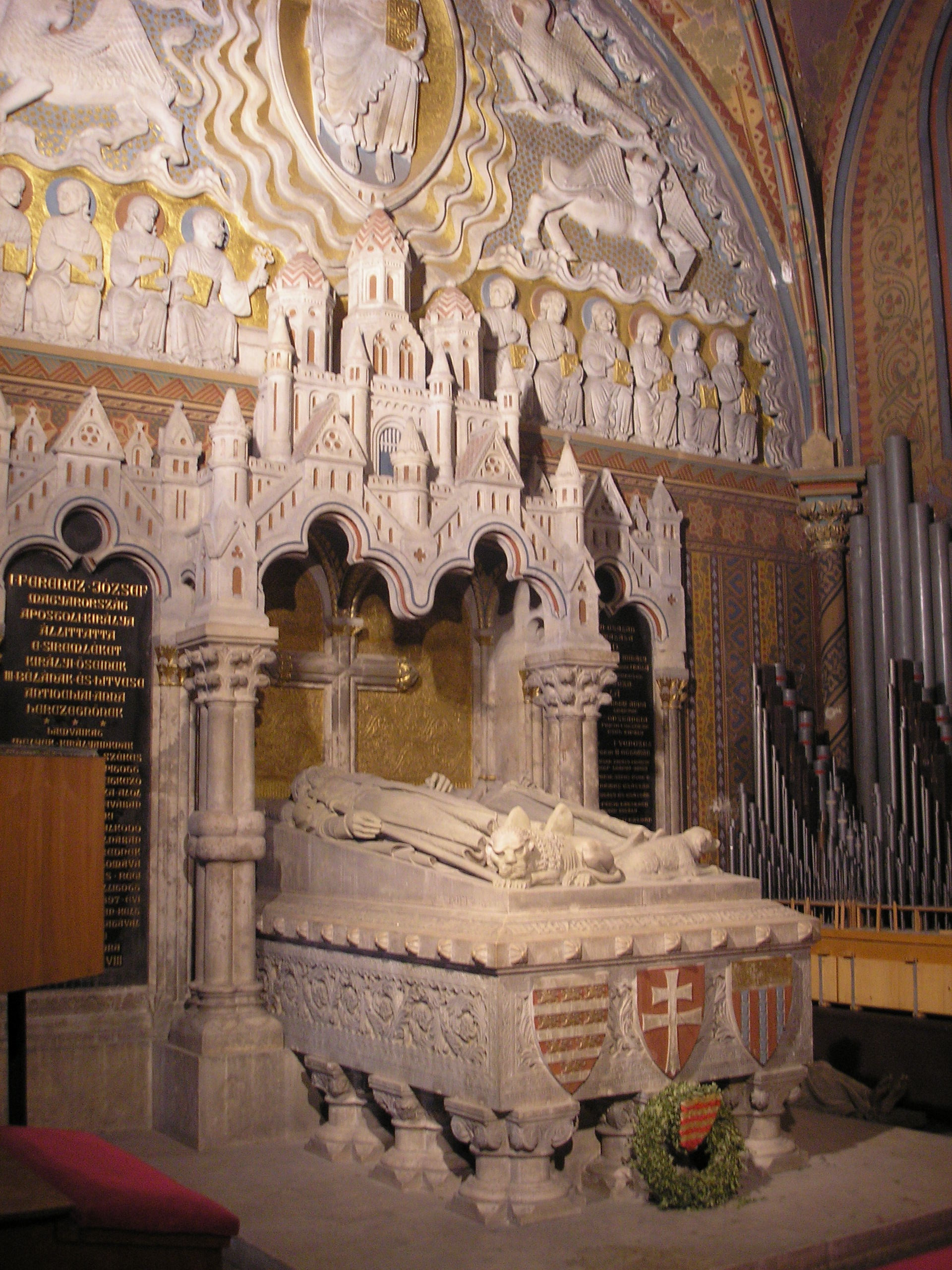
King Béla's III tomb

Béla's first wife, Agnes, was the daughter of Raynald of Châtillon, Prince of Antioch, and Raynald's wife, Constance of Antioch. Agnes was born around 1149 and died around 1184. At the time of her marriage in 1170, she was renamed Anna in Constantinople.

Béla's and Agnes-Anna's first child, Emeric, was born in 1174. Emeric's sister, Margaret, who was renamed Maria in Constantinople, was born in 1175. At the age of nine or ten, she was given in marriage to the Byzantine Emperor Isaac II Angelos, who was about 30 at the time. Maria's husband died in 1204, before the Sack of Constantinople during the Fourth Crusade. Margaret–Maria married one of the leaders of the Crusade, Boniface of Montferrat, who seized Thessaloniki after the fall of the Byzantine Empire. Historian Makk writes that in about 1210, Maria married Nicholas I of Saint Omer after the death of Boniface, but scholar Peter Lock says that Saint Omer's wife and Margaret–Maria were not identical.

The second son of Béla and Agnes-Anna, Andrew, was born around 1177. His two younger brothers, Solomon and Stephen, did not survive infancy. Their younger sister, Constance, married King Ottokar I of Bohemia in about 1198. A third daughter of Béla and Agnes-Anna, whose name is unknown, died in infancy.

After the death of Agnes-Anna, Béla proposed to Theodora, a granddaughter of Emperor Manuel I's sister, Theodora Komnene. However, a synod of the Byzantine Church forbade the marriage in 1185, because Theodora had entered a nunnery. In late 1185 or at the beginning of 1186, Béla asked for the hand of Matilda of Saxony, a daughter of Henry the Lion, Duke of Saxony, but Henry II of England, Matilda's grandfather, hindered this marriage. Finally, Béla married Henry II's widowed daughter-in-law, Margaret of France, in the summer of 1186. She was the daughter of Louis VII of France. Queen Margaret outlived Béla, and moved to the Holy Land after his death.

Ancestors of Béla III of Hungary

16. Géza I of Hungary
8. Álmos, Duke of Hungary and Croatia
17. Sophia
4. Béla II of Hungary
18. Sviatopolk II of Kiev
9. Predslava of Kiev
2. Géza II of Hungary
20. Marko (župan)
10. Uroš I of Serbia
5. Helena of Serbia
11. Anna Diogenissa
1. Béla III of Hungary
24. Vsevolod I of Kiev
12. Vladimir II Monomakh
6. Mstislav I of Kiev
26. Harold Godwinson
13. Gytha of Wessex
27. Edith the Fair
3. Euphrosyne of Kiev
7. Liubava Dmitrievna Zavidich

== Legacy ==
Béla was one of the most eminent medieval monarchs of Hungary. His "rule not only represented the apogee of the kingdom of the Árpádians, but also marked the end of an epoch", according to historian Pál Engel. His establishment of the Royal Chancery contributed to the "expansion of written records" in Hungary; the first charters issued by barons appeared in the 1190s. According to a contemporaneous list of Béla's revenues, his yearly income amounted to almost 170,000 marks (about 23 tonnes of pure silver). If the list is reliable, his income surpassed the revenues of the contemporaneous Kings of France and England, but the reliability of the list has been questioned by many historians, including Pál Engel.

In about 1190, after a fire destroyed Esztergom, Béla invited French masons to rebuild the royal palace and the cathedral. The masons introduced new architectural forms; the new royal palace and cathedral were the earliest examples of Gothic architecture in Central Europe. Coins depicting a two-barred cross, which was primarily used in the Church of the Byzantine Empire, were minted from around 1190, suggesting that the so-called "double cross" became part of the Hungarian royal heraldry under Béla III.

== Sources ==
=== Primary sources ===
- Archdeacon Thomas of Split: History of the Bishops of Salona and Split (Latin text by Olga Perić, edited, translated and annotated by Damir Karbić, Mirjana Matijević Sokol and James Ross Sweeney) (2006). CEU Press. ISBN 963-7326-59-6.
- Deeds of John and Manuel Comnenus by John Kinnamos (Translated by Charles M. Brand) (1976). Columbia University Press. ISBN 0-231-04080-6.
- "Life of John of Rila from the Stishen (Sofia) Prologue". In Petkov, Kiril (2008). The Voices of Medieval Bulgaria, Seventh-Fifteenth Century: The Records of a Bygone Culture. Brill. pp. 265–268. ISBN 978-90-04-16831-2.
- O City of Byzantium, Annals of Niketas Choniatēs (Translated by Harry J. Magoulias) (1984). Wayne State University Press. ISBN 978-0-8143-1764-8.
- The Deeds of Frederick Barbarossa by Otto of Freising and his Continuator, Rahewin (Translated and annotated with an introduction by Charles Christopher Mierow with the collaboration of Richard Emery) (2004). Columbia University Press. ISBN 0-231-13419-3.
- The Hungarian Illuminated Chronicle: Chronica de Gestis Hungarorum (Edited by Dezső Dercsényi) (1970). Corvina, Taplinger Publishing. ISBN 0-8008-4015-1.

=== Secondary sources ===
- Bartl, Július; Čičaj, Viliam; Kohútova, Mária; Letz, Róbert; Segeš, Vladimír; Škvarna, Dušan (2002). Slovak History: Chronology & Lexicon. Bolchazy-Carducci Publishers, Slovenské Pedegogické Nakladatel'stvo. ISBN 978-0-86516-444-4.
- Berend, Nora; Urbańczyk, Przemysław; Wiszewski, Przemysław (2013). Central Europe in the High Middle Ages: Bohemia, Hungary and Poland, c. 900-c. 1300. Cambridge University Press. ISBN 978-0-521-78156-5.
- Curta, Florin (2006). Southeastern Europe in the Middle Ages, 500–1250. Cambridge University Press. ISBN 978-0-521-89452-4.
- Dimnik, Martin (2003). The Dynasty of Chernigov, 1146–1246. Cambridge University Press. ISBN 978-0-521-03981-9.
- Engel, Pál (2001). The Realm of St Stephen: A History of Medieval Hungary, 895–1526. I.B. Tauris Publishers. ISBN 978-1-86064-061-2.
- Fine, John V. A. Jr. (1991) [1983]. The Early Medieval Balkans: A Critical Survey from the Sixth to the Late Twelfth Century. Ann Arbor: University of Michigan Press. ISBN 0-472-08149-7.
- Komatina, Ivana (2018). "On the attack of the Hungarian king Bela III on Serbia in light of the letter of emperor Isaac II to pope Celestine III". Facta Universitatis: Philosophy, Sociology, Psychology and History. 17 (2): 105–110. Archived from the original on 1 September 2020.
- Kontler, László (1999). Millennium in Central Europe: A History of Hungary. Atlantisz Publishing House. ISBN 978-963-9165-37-3.
- Kristó, Gyula; Makk, Ferenc (1981). III. Béla emlékezete [Remembering Béla III] (in Hungarian). Magyar Helikon.
- Kristó, Gyula; Makk, Ferenc (1996). Az Árpád-ház uralkodói [Rulers of the House of Árpád] (in Hungarian). I.P.C. Könyvek. ISBN 978-963-7930-97-3.
- Lock, Peter (1995). The Franks in the Aegean, 1204–1500. Longman. ISBN 978-0-582-05139-3.
- Magaš, Branka (2007). Croatia Through History. SAQI. ISBN 978-0-86356-775-9.
- Magdalino, Paul (1993). The Empire of Manuel Komnenos, 1143–1180. Cambridge University Press. ISBN 978-0-521-52653-1.
- Makk, Ferenc (1989). The Árpáds and the Comneni: Political Relations between Hungary and Byzantium in the 12th century (Translated by György Novák). Akadémiai Kiadó. ISBN 978-963-05-5268-4.
- Makk, Ferenc (1994). "III. Béla". In Kristó, Gyula; Engel, Pál; Makk, Ferenc (eds.). Korai magyar történeti lexikon (9–14. század) [Encyclopedia of the Early Hungarian History (9th–14th centuries)] (in Hungarian). Akadémiai Kiadó. pp. 91–92. ISBN 978-963-05-6722-0.
- Molnár, Miklós (2001). A Concise History of Hungary. Cambridge University Press. ISBN 978-0-521-66142-3.
- Rady, Martyn (2000). Nobility, Land and Service in Medieval Hungary. Palgrave. ISBN 978-0-333-80085-0.
- Runciman, Steven (1989) [1952]. A History of the Crusades, Volume II: The Kingdom of Jerusalem and the Frankish East. Vol. 2. Cambridge: Cambridge University Press. ISBN 978-0-521-06162-9.
- Stephenson, Paul (2000). Byzantium's Balkan Frontier: A Political Study of the Northern Balkans, 900–1204. Cambridge University Press. ISBN 978-0-521-02756-4.
- Treadgold, Warren (1997). A History of the Byzantine State and Society. Stanford, California: Stanford University Press. ISBN 0-8047-2630-2.

Béla III of Hungary House of Árpád Born: 1148 Died: 23 April 1196
Regnal titles
New creation	Duke of Croatia and Dalmatia c. 1161–1172	Vacant Title next held by Emeric
Preceded by Stephen III	King of Hungary and Croatia; 1172–1196	Succeeded by Emeric
