= Afshin Bey =

Seljuk military commander (died c. 1077)

- Born: 1033
- Died: c. 1078 (aged 61–62)
- Military career
- Allegiance: Seljuk Empire
- Rank: Military Commander
- Conflicts: Battle of Manzikert; Afshin Bey's invasion of Anatolia

Afshin ibn Bakji Bey (Turkish: Afşin Bey; fl.1033–1078) was a Turkoman general of the Seljuk Empire in the 11th century. He served Chaghri Beg, Alp Arslan and Malik-Shah I.

== Life ==
=== Early career and character ===
The young Afshin joined the service of Chaghri bin Mika'il bin Saljûk in 1033 and assisted him in his campaigns. Afshin had a volatile temper which often resulted in excessive cruelty to his enemies and his own occasional disgrace.

=== Raids in Byzantium ===
In 1066, Alp Arslan appointed Gumush-Tekin and Afshin to invade Byzantium and lead raids into Anatolia. They set out from Khlat and took over small fortresses between the Murat and Tigris rivers, but failed to take Nisibis. They then crossed the Euphrates and begun raiding Hisn-Mansur, where they defeated the Doux of Edessa, Aruandanos, and ransomed him.

When they returned to Khlat, Afshin killed Gumush-Tekin for killing his brother in a dispute. He then fled from Alp Arslan and allied himself with the Mirdasid Emirate of Aleppo and Ibn Khan. He established his base on Mount Amanaus, where he burned and pillaged many villages and monasteries, selling his plunder and captives to Aleppo. He returned in August 1067 to Anatolia, and after raiding Cilicia, he sacked Caesarea and destroyed its Church of Saint Basil. There, the Seljuks looted and carried away all the holy items, and even tried to break into the structure housing the Saint’s remains. Following these raids, Alp Arslan pardoned Afshin of his crime in April 1068.

He sacked the city of Amorium in 1068, but was defeated by Manuel Komnenos in 1069. He sacked Iconium a few months later, either killing or enslaving their residents, while avoiding confrontation with the Byzantine emperor Romanos IV Diogenes, who hoped to defeat him in battle, in order to restore his legitimacy.

Following the Battle of Sebasteia in 1070, and the defection of Chrysoskoulos, Alp Arslan's brother-in-law, to the Byzantine side, Afshin was ordered to chase after him and Manuel. Afshin conducted a pursuit, while raiding the surroundings of Caesarea, Sebasteia, Akroinon, Temenothyra, Hierapolis, Laodicea and Ankyra. He then sacked Chonae, pillaged the large church of Archangel Michael, and massacred the city's population. However, Chrysoskoulos and Manuel successfully reached Constantinople, so Afshin went to Chrysopolis and demanded for Chrysoskoulos to be given to him, but was refused by the Byzantines. As retaliation, he raided more Byzantine lands, before retreating to Khlat to inform the Sultan. A year later, he participated in the Battle of Manzikert in 1071.

=== Raids in Syria ===
In 1077, Malik Shah I shifted several commanders including Afshin Bey to be under the command of his brother Tutush, to aid him in the conquest of Syria. Afshin earned a reputation for the devastation his men wrought between Aleppo and Ma'arrat al Nu'man. However, after Tutush killed a certain Turkoman leader, Afshin rebelled against him and raided the land, before fleeing again and disappearing from the historical records.

== In popular culture ==
He was depicted in Diriliş: Ertuğrul, a historical docudrama. His character was played by Turgut Tunçalp.

== See also ==
- List of fugitives from justice who disappeared

== Sources ==
- Akyıldız, Selçuk (2023). Anadolu'yu Fetheden Selçuklu Komutanları ve Emirleri (Thesis) (in Turkish). Dokuz Eylül Üniversitesi.
- Basan, Osman Aziz (June 2010). The Great Seljuqs: A History. Routledge. ISBN 9781136953934.
- Baynes, Thomas Spencer (1889). "Anni". Encyclopædia Britannica. Vol. 2 (9th ed.). Adam and Charles Black.
- Matthew of Edessa's Chronicle Volume II. Translated by Bedrosian, Robert. Sophene. 2017. ISBN 978-1-925937-71-8.
- Beihammer, Alexander Daniel (2017). Byzantium and the Emergence of Muslim-Turkish Anatolia, Ca. 1040-1130 Volumen 20 de Birmingham Byzantine and Ottoman Studies. Taylor & Francis. ISBN 9781351983860.
- Finlay, George (1854), History of the Byzantine and Greek Empires from 1057 to 1453, vol. 2, William Blackwood & Sons
- Kaldellis, Anthony (2017). Streams of Gold, Rivers of Blood: The Rise and Fall of Byzantium, 955 A.D. to the First Crusade. Oxford University Press. ISBN 978-0190253226.
- Nicolle, David; Hook, Christa (illust.) (2013). Mantzikert 1071: The breaking of Byzantium. Bloomsbury Publishing. ISBN 9781780965048.
- Vryonis, Speros (1971). The Decline of Medieval Hellenism in Asia Minor and the Process of Islamization from the Eleventh through the Fifteenth Century. University of California Press. ISBN 0-520-01597-5.
- Yakupoğlu, Cevdet (2022). Malazgirt Savaşı Öncesi Anadolu'ya Yapılan Türk Akınları (in Turkish). Boğaziçi Yayınları.
