= Alp Arslan's raids into Anatolia =

Military campaigns, 1063–1070

- Part of Byzantine–Seljuk wars
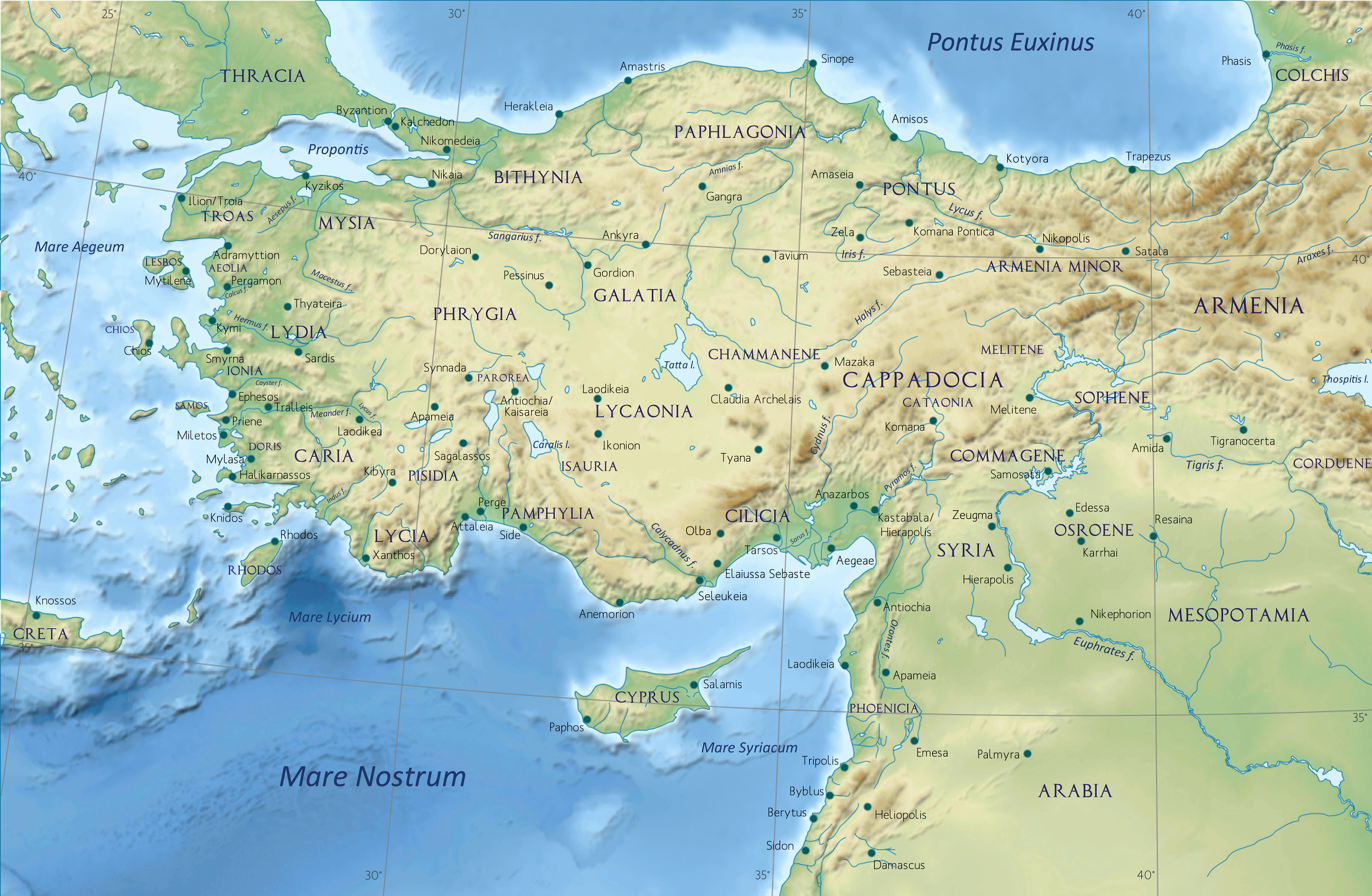
- A map showing the location of Anatolia
Date	1063–1070
Location	Anatolia, Turkey
Result	See § Result

Belligerents
Seljuk Empire; Mirdasid Emirate	Byzantine Empire

Commanders and leaders
Alp Arslan; Chrysoskoulos; Gumush-Tekin; Afshin; Khurasan Salar; Samuh; Amertikes; Sunduk; Ahmedsah; Arslantas; Duduoglu; Serhengoglu; Turkman; Dilmacoglu Mehmed; Uvakoglu Atsiz; Uvakoglu Cavli; Has Inal; Han Oglu Harum	Constantine X Doukas; Romanos IV Diogenes; Nikephoros Botaneiates; Manuel Komnenos (POW); Nikephoros Melissenos (POW); Philaretos Brachamios; Aruandanos (POW); Chatatourios; Basil Alousianos; Chrysoskoulos

Strength
Unknown	Unknown

Casualties and losses
Unknown	Unknown
- The cities of Caesarea, Neocaesarea, Amorium, Iconium and Chonae were sacked

Alp Arslan's raids into Anatolia were series of military campaigns conducted by the Seljuk Sultan Alp Arslan, and various other Seljuk leaders, against the Byzantine Empire between 1063-1070. These raids were among the first comprehensive Seljuk advances into Anatolia. The Byzantines suffered notable losses as important cities and fortresses were sacked and significant amounts of loot and captives obtained by the Seljuks, while also attempting to stem the attacks with a series of expeditions, of varying success.

== Background ==
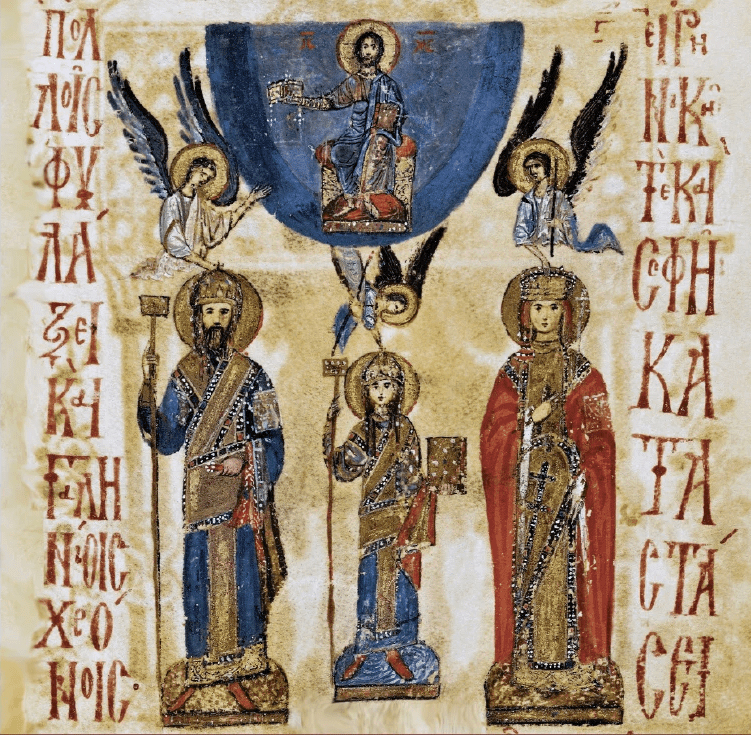
Contemporary portrait of Constantine X, Michael VII and Eudokia

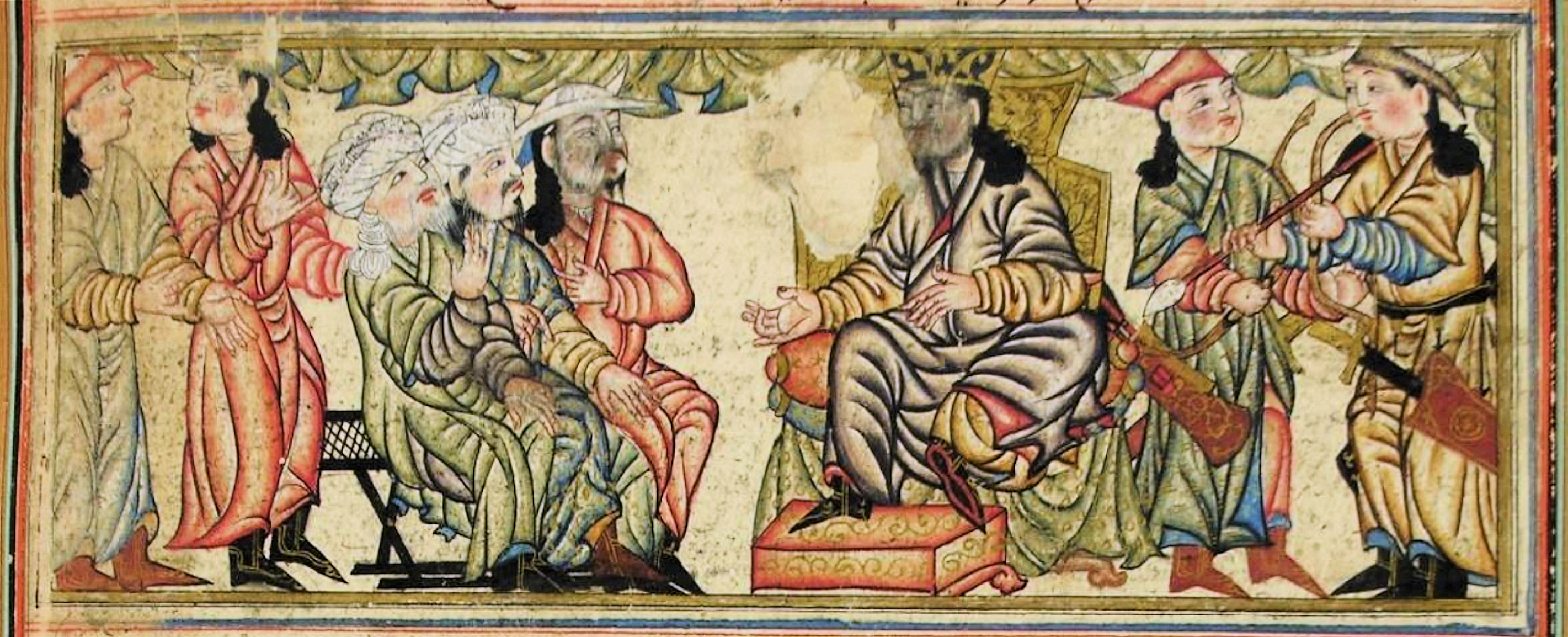
Miniature depicting Tughril I sitting on his throne

By the time emperor Constantine X Doukas ascended the throne, the Seljuks under Sultan Tughril I had already pillaged much of Armenia, along with the themes of Iberia, Mesopotamia, and other frontier regions. In 1058, the first major city in Anatolia to be sacked was Melitene, and in the following year Sebasteia met the same fate. In late 1062, during the last years of Tughril's reign, Seljuk forces intensified their attacks against the Byzantines. The regions of Paghin, T’lmux and Arkin were plundered with large quantities of captives taken.

In response, Emperor Constantine X dispatched his forces under the Doux of Edessa, Dabatenos and the Norman-Byzantine stratelates of the east Hervé Frangopoulos, to repulse the attack. Hesitant to engage in a pitched battle, the Seljuks initiated a withdrawal upon learning of their approach. The Byzantine commanders then marched against Amida (which had rebelled and submitted to the Seljuks), conducting an operation in which they were ultimately victorious, despite the death of Dabatenos in combat. When leading the Byzantine army back, Frangopoulos met a column of the Seljuk army which was attempting to retreat and engaged them near Theodosiopolis. This Seljuk host was annihilated in a pitched battle and the plunder was recovered, with a certain emir Yusuf being slain.

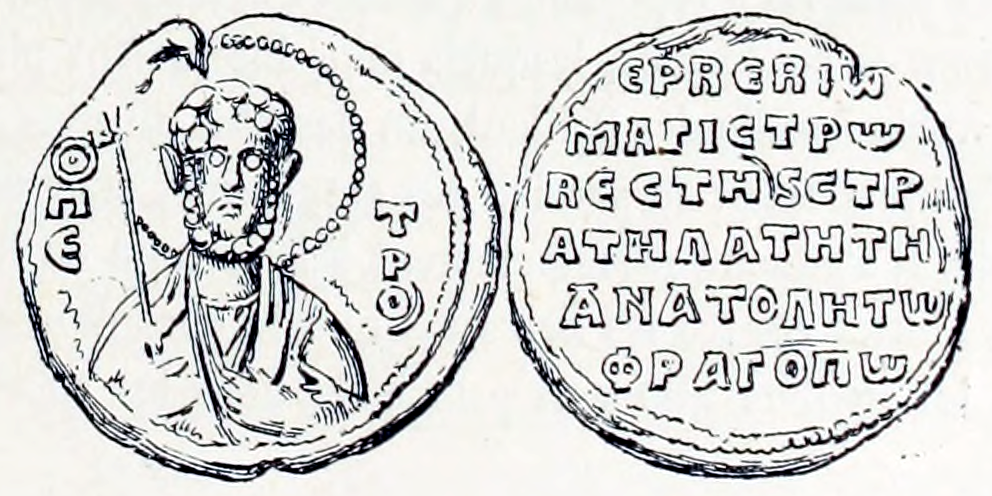
Lead seal of Hervé Frangopoulos, depicting Saint Peter

Despite the defeat of Yusuf's forces, the overall Seljuk raid in that season had been a success in collecting plunder and gathering information about the surrounding area, while the lands that had been pillaged became depopulated.

== Renewed Seljuk Invasions ==
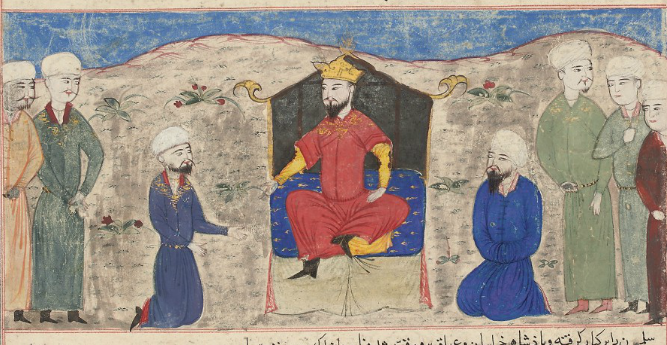
Depiction of Alp Arslan sitting on his throne, from the Mojma al-Tawarikh by Hafiz-i Abru

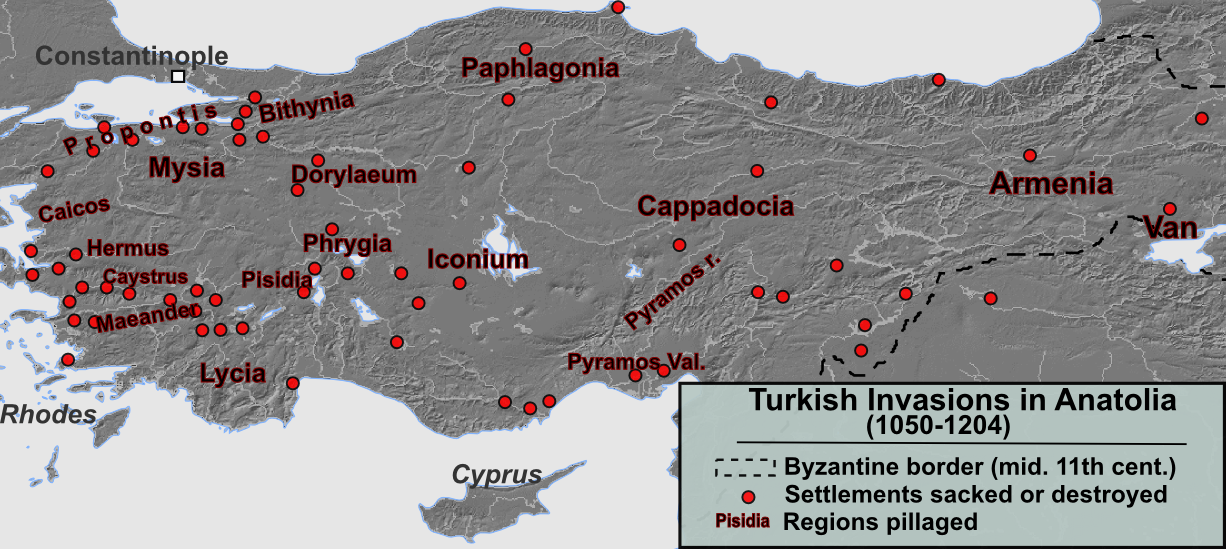
Anatolia during the first waves of Seljuk invasions (11th-13th century)

In 1064, after Alp Arslan became Sultan, the Byzantines suffered a devastating loss when the prosperous city of Ani was sacked by the Seljuks after a siege, with the city devastated and its populace massacred. This victory encouraged further incursions by the Turkomans in the following years.

=== Khurasan Salar ===
In 1065, Khurasan Salar organized another raid against Edessa, where local Byzantine forces faced difficulties with their Franco-Norman mercenaries. As Salar's army advanced, its vanguard attacked the fortress of Sewawerak. There, the Byzantine Garrison, numbering at 200 and mostly composed of Franks, sallied out and defeated the Seljuk vanguard, forcing it to abandon the attack. Upon witnessing the arrival of the much larger main body of Turkomans however, the Franks abandoned their pursuit and withdrew to the fortress. The Seljuk army bypassed Sewawerak to advance against Edessa. A Byzantine relief force under the Doux of Antioch arrived and attempted to coordinate a surprise attack against Salar's camp, but the disobedience of the Frankish troops garrisoning Edessa, who refused to join the attack, caused the failure of this endeavor. Later in the campaign, the forces from Edessa attempted to intercept Salar again, only for the Frankish troops to turn tail and flee before battle had even been joined. Jonathan Harris notes that the increasing importance of Frankish mercenaries among the Byzantine armies at this time a factor in the decline in tactical capabilities of the Byzantine military, contributing to their increasing inability to counter the Turks. Having witnessed the state of disarray of the Byzantine forces stationed in Edessa, the Seljuks were encouraged to renew their raids into this area.

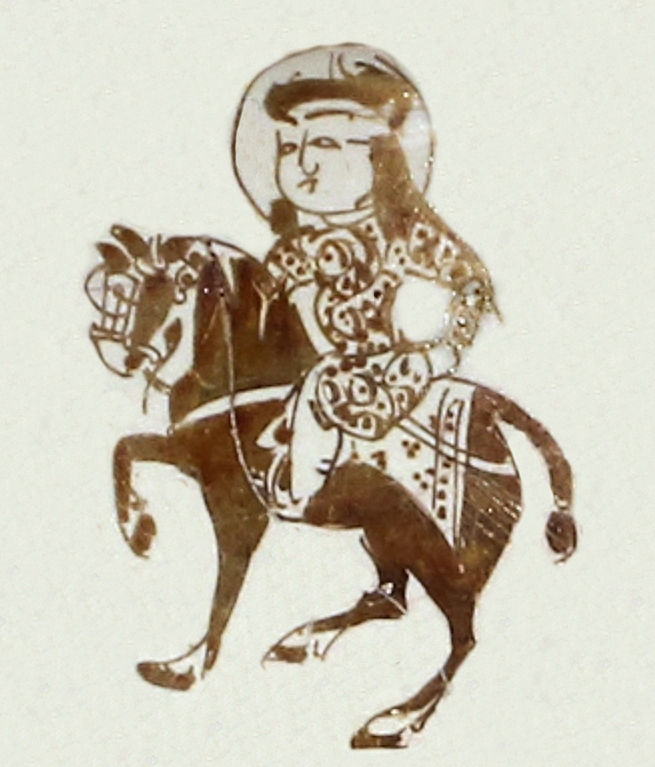
Depiction of a Seljuk horserider

=== Gumush ===
In 1066, upon the orders of the Sultan, the Seljuk chieftains Gumush-Tekin and Afshin set out from Khlat, followed the Murat and Tigris rivers and conquered many small fortresses along their way. Gumush raided into T’lmux, where he captured the fort of Tle't'ut' and killed everyone inside. He then moved against the area surrounding Edessa, where he unsuccessfully besieged the city of Nisibis for a few days. After the siege failed, he crossed the Euphrates river and begun raiding Hisn-Mansur. The doux of Edessa, Aruandanos, marched against the Seljuks with a relief force. A battle was fought near the fortress of O'she'n, in which Aruandanos attempted to lure the Turkomans into pursuit with a feigned retreat, only for his cavalry formation to break down. The inability to perform this maneuvre previously mastered by the Byzantines in earlier times is indicative of the decline in the quality of their armed forces during the 1060s, and possibly of further problems resulting from reliance on mercenary contingents. Aruandanos was captured, but later released in exchange for 40,000 dahekans.

=== Afshin ===
As a result of a disagreement among the Seljuk Turkomans in Ahlat, Gumush killed Afshin's brother, whereupon Afshin killed Gumush. Fearing the reaction of Alp Arslan, Afshin retreated to Mount Amanaus, where he burned and plundered many monasteries and villages, and established his headquarters, allying himself with the Mirdasids. From there, he would conduct raids from 1066 to 1067, attacking the areas around Antioch and Melitene. In 1067 he raided Cilicia and sacked the city of Caesarea, burned it to the ground, destroyed the shrine of Saint Basil, and either killed or enslaved its inhabitants. After pillaging these regions, Afshin, and the Turkomans under his command, headed to Aleppo to sell the goods and captives they had seized. Alp Arslan welcomed these events and pardoned Afshin of his crime.

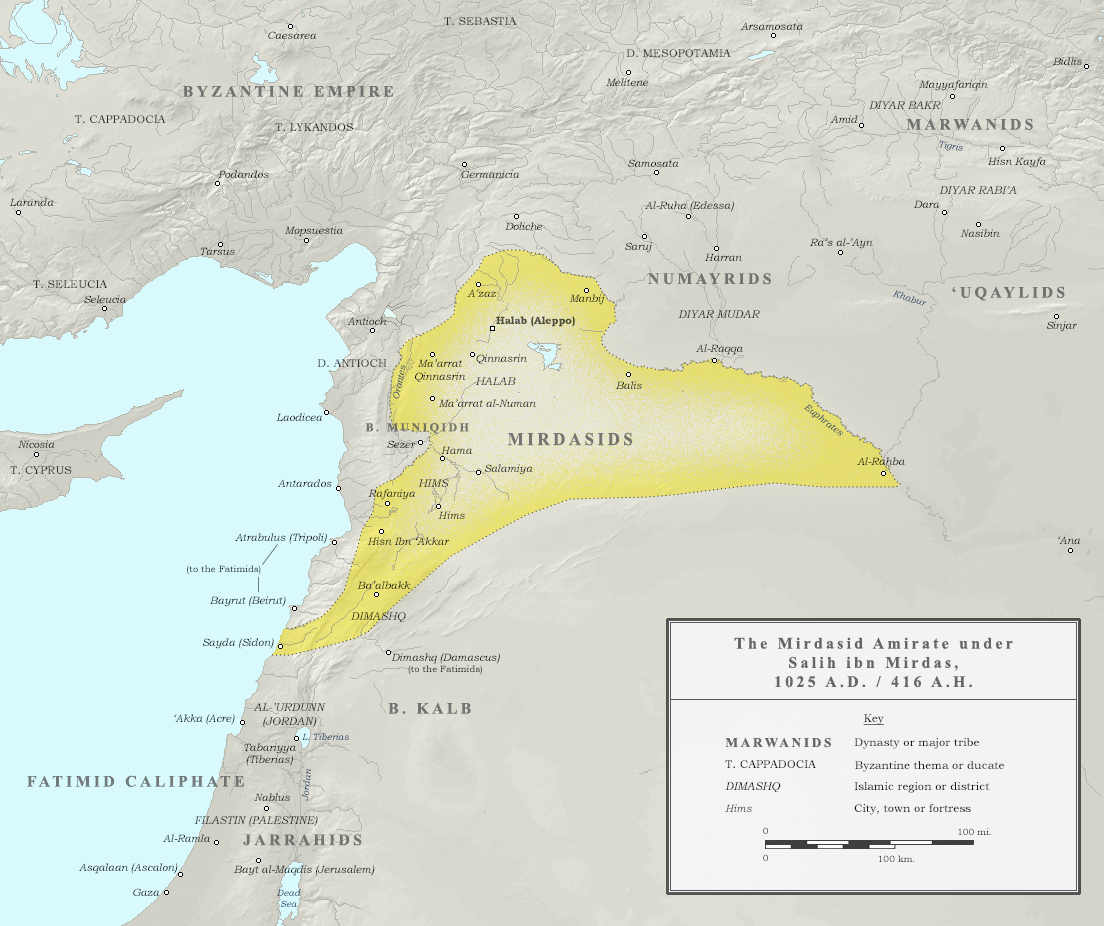
The Mirdasid Emirate in 1025

=== Other Raids ===
Around the same time, Samuh was pillaging the areas around Sebasteia, Salar was raiding the regions of Thelkum, Nisibis and Seveverek, while Amertikes, the Byzantine renegade who had joined the Seljuks, was active in southern Anatolia and northern Syria. Other Seljuk chieftains who were active in those years include: Sunduk, Ahmedsah, Arslantas, Duduoglu, Serhengoglu, Turkman, Dilmacoglu Mehmed, Uvakoglu Atsiz, Uvakoglu Cavli, Has Inal and Han Oglu Harum.

== Byzantine response ==
=== Ascension of Romanos IV Diogenes ===
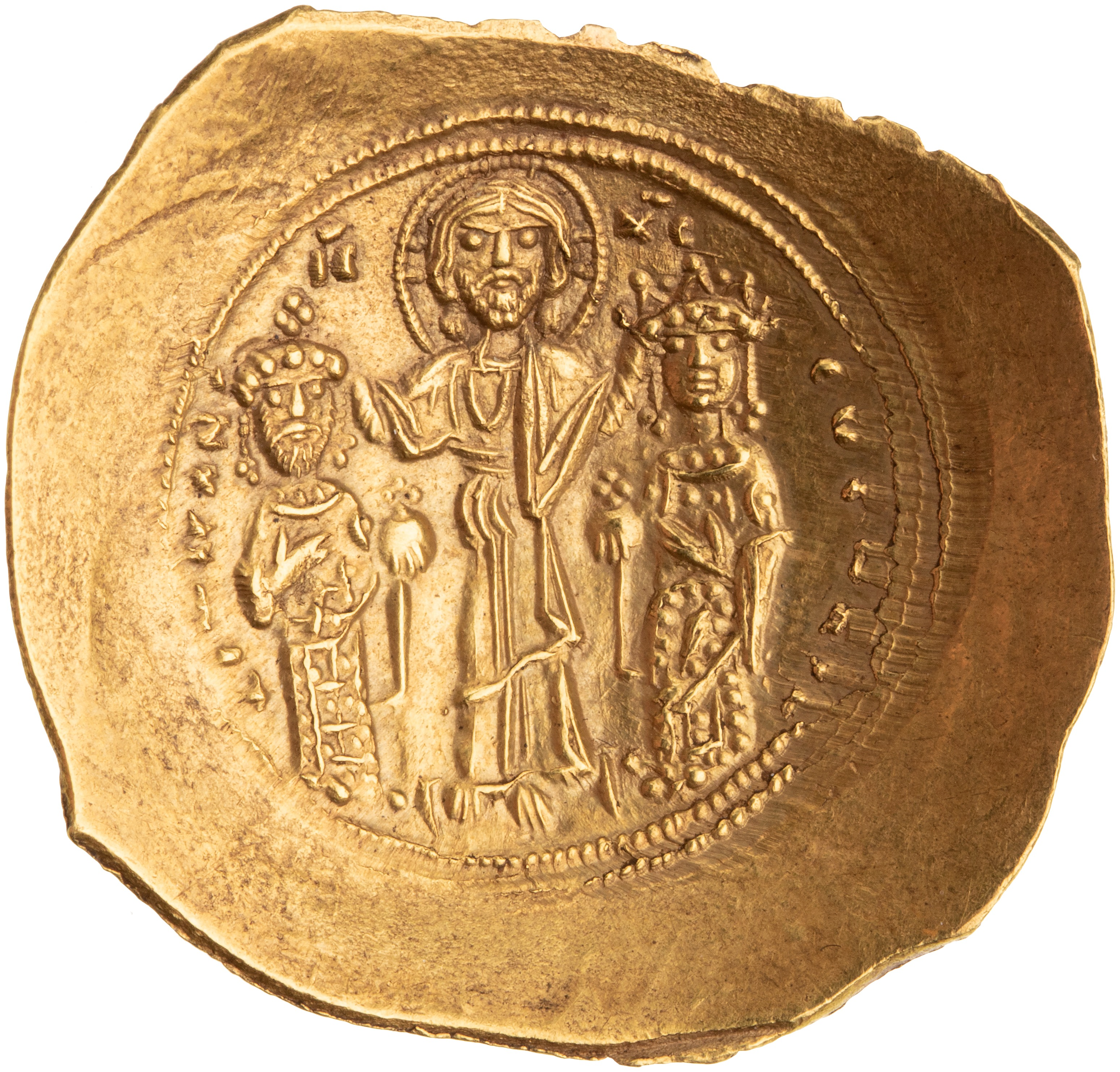
Gold histamenon depicting Romanos and Eudokia crowned by Christ

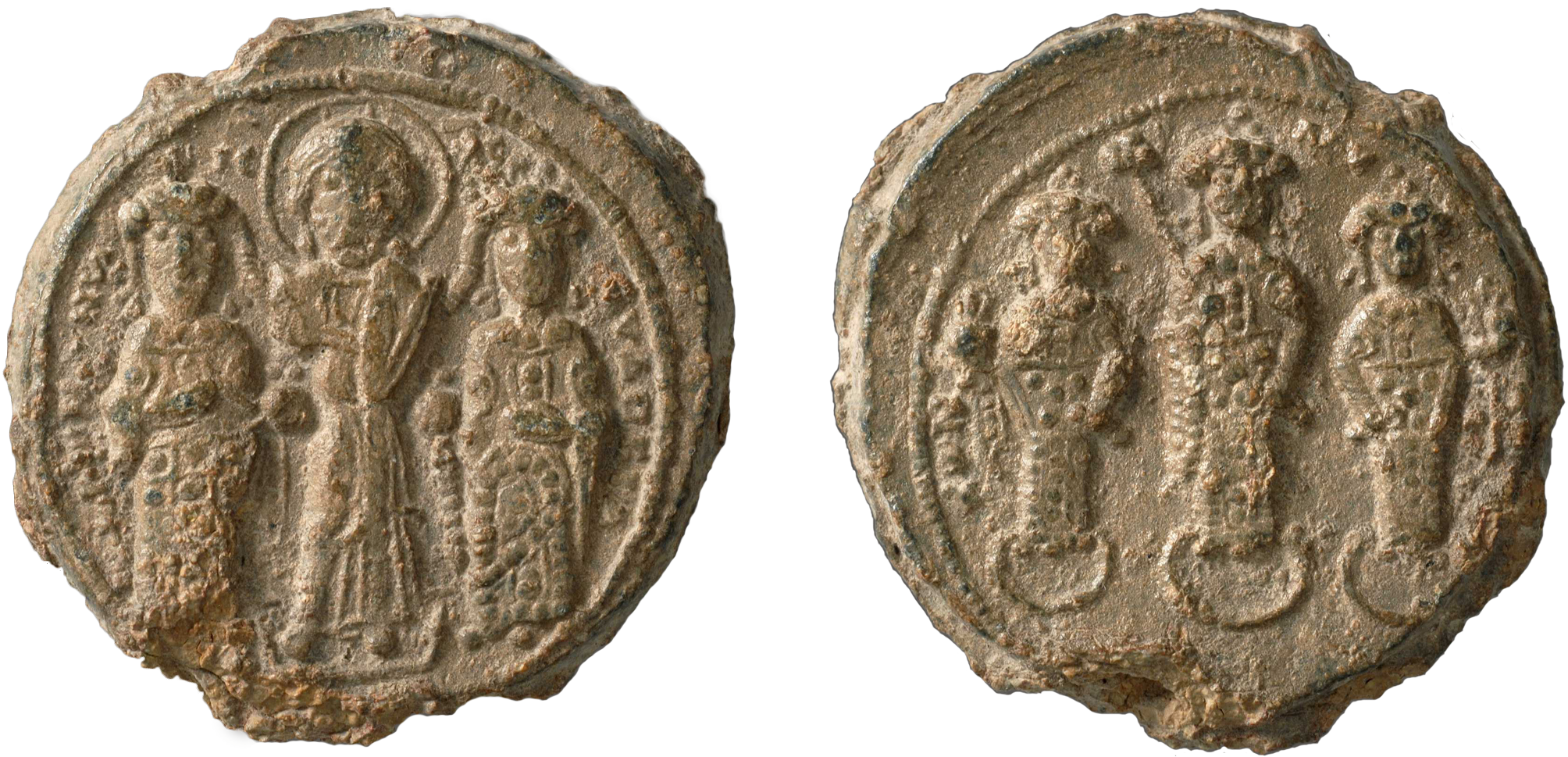
Seal of Romanos with Eudokia Makrembolitissa and her three sons

Facing difficulties due to the raids of the Turkomans, the Byzantine Empress Eudokia Makrembolitissa married Romanos Diogenes in 1068 to resolve the internal problems within the empire and to stop the Seljuk raids. Romanos was a veteran commander who had some experience in facing nomadic threats, having previously defeated a Pecheneg invasion of the Byzantine Balkans, as strategos in 1066. However, the Byzantine army of the late 1060s was in a poor condition. It was described by Michael Attaleiates as numerically weak with men poorly armed, underarmourd, and underpaid. The recent setbacks against the Seljuks and other enemies had further degraded its strength and morale. Emperor Romanos set about reorganizing the military, but was forced to hastily assemble his forces into a sizeable field army and lead it on an expedition to the east to confront the Seljuks. This army's units varied in quality, included many mercenaries, and had little experience in battlefield maneuvre. Despite these deficiencies, after setting out from Caesarea, the Byzantines managed to win an early victory over a Seljuk raiding army in a cavalry battle near Sebasteia, during which the light cavalry of the Byzantines managed to force the Seljuks into close quarter combat.

Following this initial success, Emperor Romanos begun marching torwards the southeast, but around that time the Seljuks captured and plundered Neocaesarea. After learning this, Romanos immediately selected a small mobile force and marched towards Sebasteia (where he left his infantry and baggage), and then to Tephrike, pursuing the Seljuks for eight days. He surprised the Seljuks, killed many of them, and forced the rest to abandon their plunder and release their prisoners, though a large number of nomads managed to escape.

At around the same time 1067-1068, the Doux of Antioch Nikephoros Botaneiates organised defences against Seljuk and Mirdasid attacks from Syria. A company of fresh recruits were despatched to reinforce him by the regency government of Constantinople, but due to their ill-equipped nature and poor fighting quality Botaniates disbanded and dismissed these men. Instead, he enrolled and drilled units of local men to complement his own elite retinue. This Byzantine force subsequently achieved successes in defeating the Turkish raiders, which temporarily halted their incursions around Antioch.

=== Expedition to Hierapolis ===
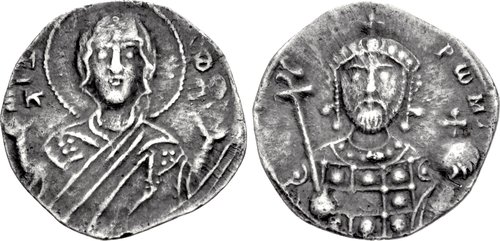
One third Miliaresion depicting the Theotokos on the obverse, Romanos on the reverse

In 1068 Romanos marched towards Hierapolis and captured the city. However, the forces of the Emir of Aleppo, Nasr ibn Mahmud, supported by Seljuk contingents, rushed to oppose him. Near the city, a contingent of Byzantine cavalry faced the Turkomans as they feigned retreat to lure the Byzantines, and then annihilated this squadron once its formation was broken. The next day however, a decisive battle occurred between the two sides. This time the Byzantine infantry in the center broke the line of their Arab-Seljuk opponents, putting the enemy to flight. In a short pursuit that followed, they inflicted severe losses upon the defeated Mirdasids and Seljuks. The expedition ended in success and restored morale within the army.

Romanos then learned that Afshin and Ahmedsah had attacked Amorium, sacking the city and killing most of its population. However, by that point the nomads had already withdrawn from the region and headed back to their base. Despite the sack, the general Manuel Komnenos managed to thwart a Seljuk attack against Iconium with a counterattack. After continuing his Syrian campaign until the onset of Winter, with a series of skirmishes and minor sieges against the Mirdasids, Romanos brought his army homewards, crossing the Taurus mountains to dismiss his men to their winter quarters in central Anatolia, before the Emperor himself reached Constantinople in January 1069.

=== Second Expedition ===
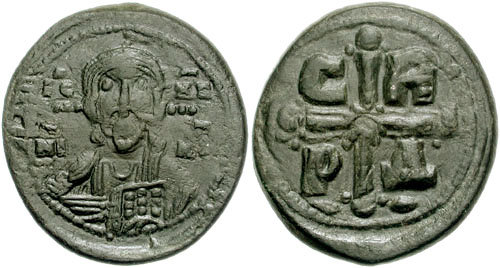
Copper follis depicting Christ Pantokrator on the obverse, while the reverse depicts a cross quartered with the letters ϹΒΡΔ for the motto "Thy Cross aid the Lord Romanos"

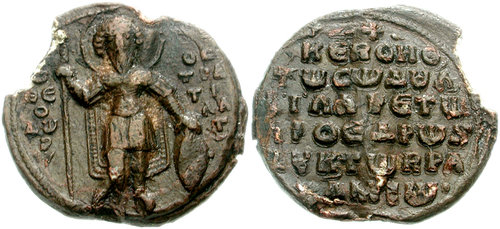
Lead seal of Philaretos Brachamios, depicting Saint Theodore Stratelates

In 1069, after dealing with the rebellion of the Norman mercenary Robert Crispin, Romanos begun his second campaign against the nomads. He caught and destroyed a group of Seljuks in the mountains near Larissa, and then chased Afshin from Melitene, back over the Euphrates river. At this point a separate Seljuk detachment attempted to attack the Byzantine marching camp, but was thwarted. Romanos then decided to split his forces, with one army focused on countering the Seljuks in Cilicia, and the second one headed towards Khlat. The second force, placed under the Armenian commander Philaretos Brachamios, suffered a defeat in Meletine by Afshin, who proceeded to sack Iconium. The first force however, led by Romanos himself, defeated the Seljuks near Seleucia with the help of reinforcements from the Armenian Doux Chatatourios, forcing the nomads to abandon their plunder and flee. However, most of the horsemen survived and managed to retreat to Aleppo, while pillaging Byzantine territories along the way.

Having driven out the nomads from Cilicia, Romanos was forced to redirect his expedition back against Seljuk raiders in central Anatolia. In this expedition, Romanos won further battles and skirmishes against the Turkomans in the vicinity of Caesarea, Palu and Sebasteia, and took a number of them captive, but as the swiftness of the Seljuk horsemen allowed most of them to escape even in defeat, the Byzantines were unable to secure a strategically decisive victory. To compound matters, Romanos began to face rebellion among his own troops around this time. Having driven away the Seljuks for the time being, Romanos stationed men from his army to reinforce the eastern defences and ended his expedition, retiring to Constantinople in autumn 1069.

=== Chrysoskoulos ===
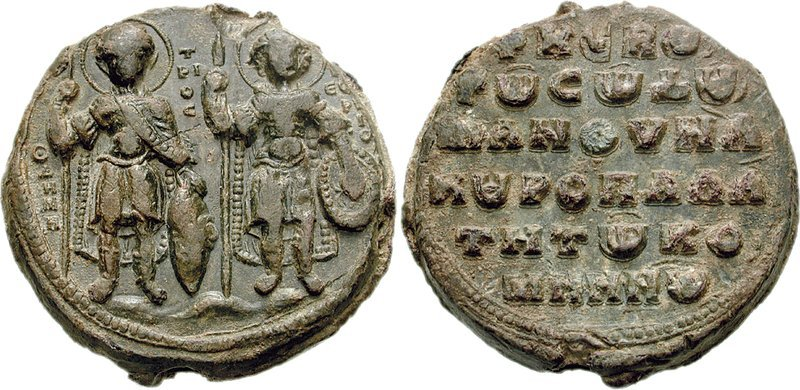
Lead seal of Manuel Komnenos, depicting Saints Demetrius and George

Arisighi, later baptized as Chrysoskoulos, was the son-in-law of Alp Arslan. He had openly revolted against him, was defeated in battle, and was forced to flee to Cappadocia, where he began raiding Byzantine lands. Alp Arslan dispatched Afshin to hunt him down. In 1070, Chrysoskoulos was confronted by Manuel Komnenos, who had previously faced some success against the Seljuks in Caesarea. In the battle of Sebasteia that followed, Manuel was defeated and captured, but managed to convince Chrysoskoulos to defect to the Byzantines. Chrysoskoulos provided the Byzantines with information about Seljuk tactics and politics, and was honoured by the emperor, given gifts and converted to Christianity. According to Turkish researcher Selcuk Akyildiz: "This was the first time a Seljuk dignitary had sought refuge in Byzantium".

Hearing of these events, Afshin conducted a pursuit of Manuel and Chrysoskoulos, raiding the surroundings of Caesarea, Sebasteia, Akroinon, Temenothyra, Hierapolis, Laodicea and Ankyra. In 1070 he sacked Chonae, looted the large church of Archangel Michael, and massacred much of the city's population. He eventually reached Chrysopolis, where he sent an envoy to Emperor Romanos demanding that Chrysoskoulos and his men to be given to him, but the Byzantines refused, causing Afshin to plunder more Byzantine settlements. Afshin subsequently retired to Khlat and informed Alp Arslan about Chrysoskoulos' defection.

== Result ==
As a result of these extensive and continuous raids by the Seljuks, much of Byzantine Anatolia was severely shaken, with multiple regions pillaged and many important cities destroyed. Despite Romanos Diogenes' efforts, and despite conducting a relatively successful campaign in 1068, he was unable to score a decisive victory in 1069, failing at securing the campaign's main objective.

Though they gained a number of limited victories, the Byzantine armies were unable to decisively check the Seljuk onslaught, while the Byzantine defeats exposed the organisational problems they faced. The troops and garrisons in the region were exhausted, and issues of morale and obedience, such as with Frankish mercenaries, further hindered their ability to respond to the Seljuk attacks. In 1070, Romanos funded the construction of forts in Asia Minor. According to historian Anthony Kaldellis: "two which are known epigraphically guard passes between the center and the coastal lands, indicating that strategically all of Asia Minor was now believed to be a potential war zone".

== Aftermath ==
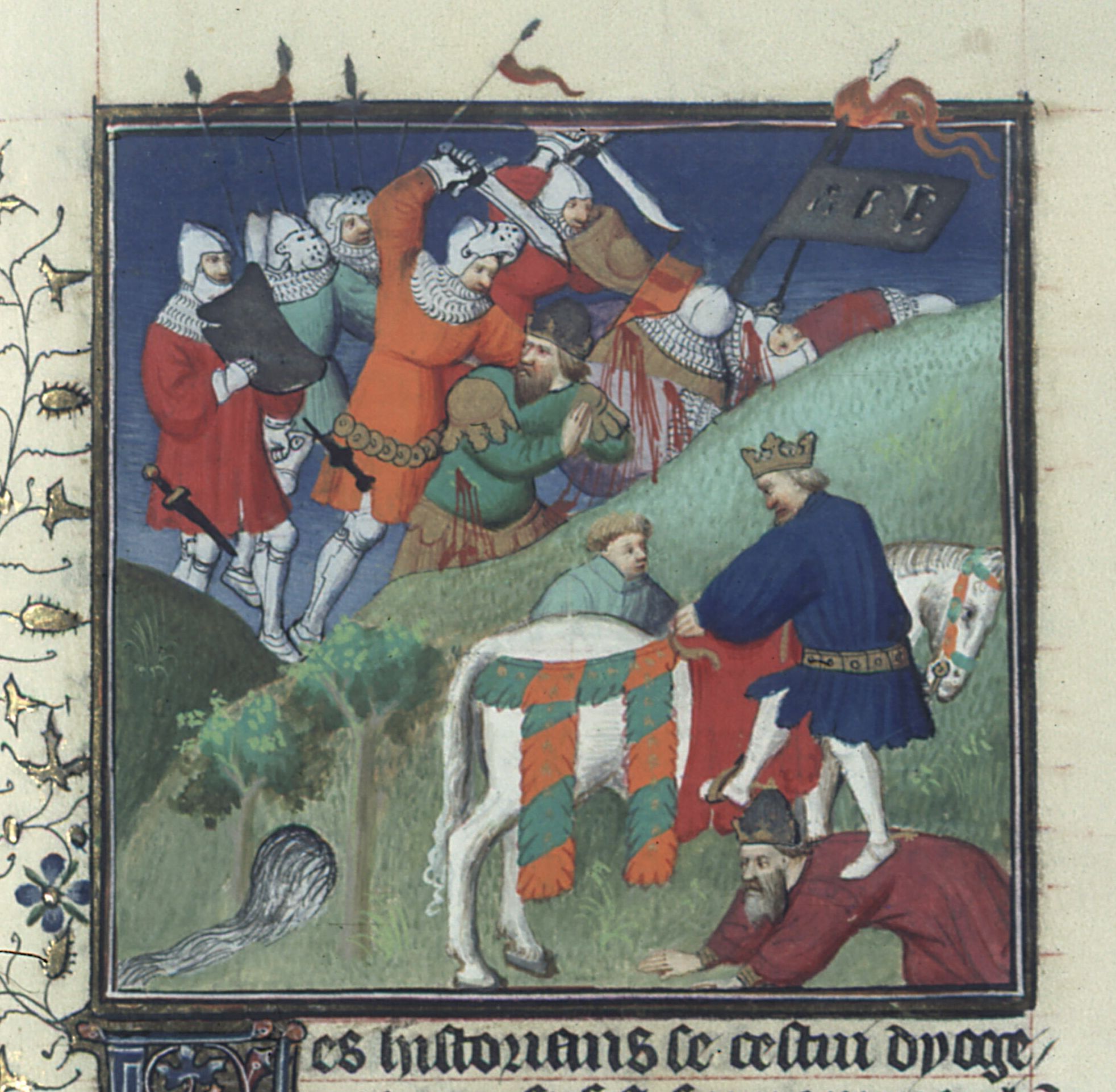
Depiction of the Battle of Manzikert from 15th century France

In early 1070, Alp Arslan personally led a campaign into Byzantine Mesopotamia, capturing many small forts. He besieged, but could not capture Edessa, following an almost 50-day siege, thanks to the efforts of its Doux, Basil Alousianos, who was a descendant of Bulgarian Tsars, however the Sultan did force the city to pay 50,000 dinars to lift the siege. In spring 1071, Alp Arslan changed his focus to the Fatimid Caliphate and attacked Aleppo. Following a small siege, its governor, Emir Mahmud, made peace with, and submitted to the Sultan. Romanos observed that the Seljuks were occupied with the Fatimids, and saw that as an opportunity to lead a large army into eastern Anatolia and Armenia, to recover lost fortresses and drive out the invading nomads. This third campaign would lead to the decisive Battle of Manzikert.

== Bibliography ==
- Akyıldız, Selçuk (2023). Anadolu'yu Fetheden Selçuklu Komutanları ve Emirleri (Thesis) (in Turkish). Dokuz Eylül Üniversitesi.
- Baynes, Thomas Spencer (1889). "Anni". Encyclopædia Britannica. Vol. 2 (9th ed.). Adam and Charles Black.
- Matthew of Edessa's Chronicle Volume II. Translated by Bedrosian, Robert. Sophene. 2017. ISBN 978-1-925937-71-8.
- Beihammer, Alexander Daniel (2017). Byzantium and the Emergence of Muslim-Turkish Anatolia, Ca. 1040-1130 Volumen 20 de Birmingham Byzantine and Ottoman Studies. Taylor & Francis. ISBN 9781351983860.
- Finlay, George (1854), History of the Byzantine and Greek Empires from 1057 to 1453, vol. 2, William Blackwood & Sons
- Grant, R. G. (2005). Battle a Visual Journey Through 5000 Years of Combat. London: Dorling Kindersley. p. 77. ISBN 1-74033-593-7.
- Harris, Jonathan (2014), Byzantium and the Crusades (2nd ed.), Bloomsbury Academic, ISBN 978-1780938318
- Kaldellis, Anthony (2017). Streams of Gold, Rivers of Blood: The Rise and Fall of Byzantium, 955 A.D. to the First Crusade. Oxford University Press. ISBN 978-0190253226.
- Kaldellis, Anthony (2024). The New Roman Empire: A History of Byzantium. Oxford University Press. ISBN 978-0-19-754932-2.
- Maynard, Daniel (2021). The Last Bringer of Victory: Nikephoros III Botaneiates AD1078-1081.
- McMahon, Lucas (2015). The past and future of De Velitatione Bellica and Byzantine Guerrilla Warfare (PDF). Budapest, Hungary: Central European University.
- Merçil, Erdoğan (2013). Müslüman Türk Devletleri Tarihi (in Turkish). İstanbul: Bilge Kültür Sanat Yayınları. ISBN 978-605-5261-85-6.
- Paroń, Aleksander (2021). The Pechenegs: Nomads in the Political and Cultural Landscape of Medieval Europe. Translated by Anessi, Thomas. Leiden, Boston: Brill. ISBN 978-90-04-44109-5.
- Sevim, Ali; Merçil, Erdoğan (1995). Selçuklu Devletleri Tarihi: Siyaset, Teşkilat ve Kültür (in Turkish). Ankara: Türk Tarih Kurumu. ISBN 978-975-16-0690-7.
- Sümer, Faruk. "Afşin". Türkiye Diyanet Vakfı İslâm Ansiklopedisi (in Turkish). Vol. 1. Archived from the original on 14 February 2021.
- Theotokis, Georgios; Mesko, Marek (2020). War in Eleventh-Century Byzantium. Taylor & Francis. ISBN 9780429576881.
- Turan, Osman (2019). Selçuklular Tarihi ve Türk-İslâm Medeniyeti (in Turkish) (22 ed.). Istanbul: Ötüken. ISBN 978-975-437-470-4.
- Vaughan, Louis Bréhier; translated by Margaret (1977). The life and death of Byzantium. Amsterdam: North-Holland Pub. Co. ISBN 9780720490084.
- Vryonis, Speros (1971). The Decline of Medieval Hellenism in Asia Minor and the Process of Islamization from the Eleventh through the Fifteenth Century. University of California Press. ISBN 0-520-01597-5.
- Yakupoğlu, Cevdet (2022). Malazgirt Savaşı Öncesi Anadolu'ya Yapılan Türk Akınları (in Turkish). Boğaziçi Yayınları.
