= Battle of Iconium =

Battle of Iconium may refer to:

- Siege of Iconium (1069), part of the Byzantine–Seljuq wars
- Battle of Iconium (1190), part of the Third Crusade
