= Chrysoskoulos =

Seljuk emir and Byzantine official

- Born: Unknown
- Died: After 1078
- Allegiance: Seljuk Empire (until 1070); Byzantine Empire (after 1070)
- Rank: Emir; Proedros
- Conflicts: Byzantine-Seljuk Wars: Alp Arslan's raids into Anatolia; Battle of Sebasteia; Rebellion of Nikephoros Botaneiates

Chrysoskoulos (Greek: Χρυσόσκουλος) or Erisigi/Erbasgan (Turkish: Erisığı/Erbasgan) or Arîsîaghî/Arîsîghî (Arabic: أريزغن/أرسكي) or Ktrič (Armenian: Կտրիճ) was a Turkoman emir, chieftain of the Navekkiye tribe, and brother-in-law of the Seljuk Sultan Alp Arslan. He participated in the Byzantine-Seljuk Wars and defected to the side of the Byzantine Empire.

== Biography ==
=== Early activity ===
Chrysoskoulos was a noble of the Seljuk Empire, the son of Yunus, and the grandson of the dynasty's founder Seljuk. He first appears in the historical records as an emir and brother-in-law of Alp Arslan, whom he rebelled against and lost. After his defeat, the sultan ordered his general Afshin to pursue him, so he and his army retreated into Byzantine Anatolia, where they proceeded to raid and pillage the Armeniakon Theme and the region of Cappadocia. The Kouropalates Manuel Komnenos learned of the group while withdrawing to Hierapolis, and rushed his small force in order to repel them. Chrysoskoulos ambushed Manuel at the Battle of Sebasteia and captured him, along with his subcommanders. According to Matthew of Edessa, following the battle, the Armenian king and princes allied themselves with the young emir.

=== Alignment with the Byzantines ===
During his captivity, Manuel successfully managed to convince Chrysoskoulos to join the side of the Byzantines. Together, they raced towards Constantinople, while Afshin chased after them, raiding the countryside during the pursuit. Eventually though, they managed to reach the Byzantine capital. Once Afshin arrived at Chrysopolis, in the opposite side of the Bosporus Strait, he demanded for Chrysoskoulos and his men to be given to him, but the Byzantines refused. In frustration, Afshin plundered more Byzantine lands while on his retreat back to Khlat, where he informed Alp Arslan about the situation. According to Turkish researcher Selcuk Akyildiz: "This was the first time a Seljuk dignitary had sought refuge in Byzantium".

After a few days of waiting in the Byzantine capital, and after the Emperor Romanos IV Diogenes had finished discussing with the senate, Chrysoskoulos was welcomed and honoured by the emperor with gifts and titles, and was even given the rank of proedros. He gave the Byzantines information regarding Seljuk politics and battle tactics, converted to Christianity and was given the name Chrysoskoulos.

=== Romanos IV's third campaign ===
Routes of Emperor Romanos IV Diogenes and of Sultan Alp Arslan before the Battle of Manzikert

In 1071, he accompanied Romanos IV in his third campaign against the Seljuks. When Manuel Komnenos died of illness early in the campaign, Chrysoskoulos, who had become his friend, mourned him and was so upset he wished to die himself. When the imperial army reached Sebasteia, Emperor Romanos heard from local Byzantines that they had been mistreated by the Armenians following the previous year's battle. Romanos originally ordered for the city to be looted in revenge, but was dissuaded by Chrysoskoulos, who defended the Armenians by saying that those of them who had survived the battle against him had continued to aid the emperor afterwards. After the army recaptured the city of Manzikert, the emperor sent Chrysoskoulos back to Constantinople, before preparing his forces for the upcoming battle. (Note: Around that time, the emperor had learned that the Turkic mercenaries in his army had been secretly conversing with Alp Arslan, and either due to suspicion or for protection, he sent Chrysoskoulos away to the capital.)

=== Later activity ===
In 1078, Chrysoskoulos saved Nikephoros Botaneiates from getting captured by the Turkomans Suleiman close to Nicaea. He became an intermediary between the two and managed to convince his relative to support Botaneiates with soldiers, contributing to his success in seizing the throne and becoming emperor the same year.

== Appearance and personality ==
Michael Attaleiates records that he was young, of small of stature—a pygmy—and had a "Scythian and ungraceful appearance". Matthew of Edessa describes him as a "benevolent man".

== Sources ==
- Akyıldız, Selçuk (2023). Anadolu'yu Fetheden Selçuklu Komutanları ve Emirleri (Thesis) (in Turkish). Dokuz Eylül Üniversitesi.
- Matthew of Edessa's Chronicle Volume II. Translated by Bedrosian, Robert. Sophene. 2017. ISBN 978-1-925937-71-8.
- Kaldellis, Anthony (2017). Streams of Gold, Rivers of Blood: The Rise and Fall of Byzantium, 955 A.D. to the First Crusade. Oxford University Press. ISBN 978-0190253226.
- Kaldellis, Anthony (2024). The New Roman Empire: A History of Byzantium. Oxford University Press. ISBN 978-0-19-754932-2.
- Leveniotis, Georgios Athanasios (2007). The Political Collapse of Byzantium in the East: The Eastern Frontier and Central Asia Minor During the Second Half of the 11th Century (PhD thesis) (in Greek). Aristotle University of Thessaloniki. doi:10.12681/eadd/19246. hdl:10442/hedi/19246.
- Neville, Leonora (2012). Heroes and Romans in Twelfth-Century Byzantium. The Material for History of Nikephoros Bryennios. Cambridge University Press. ISBN 978-1-107-00945-5.
- Sevim, Ali; Merçil, Erdoğan (1995). Selçuklu Devletleri Tarihi: Siyaset, Teşkilat ve Kültür (in Turkish). Ankara: Türk Tarih Kurumu. ISBN 978-975-16-0690-7.
- Shukurov, Rustam (2016). The Byzantine Turks, 1204-1461. BRILL. ISBN 9789004307759.
- Turan, Osman (2019). Selçuklular Tarihi ve Türk-İslâm Medeniyeti (in Turkish) (22 ed.). Istanbul: Ötüken. ISBN 978-975-437-470-4.
- Varzos, Konstantinos (1984). Η Γενεαλογία των Κομνηνών [The Genealogy of the Komnenoi] (PDF) (in Greek). Vol. A1. Thessaloniki: Centre for Byzantine Studies, University of Thessaloniki.
- Vasilakidou, Elizavet (2009). The Reign of Romanos IV Diogenes (1068-1071) (PDF) (Thesis) (in Greek). Aristotle University of Thessaloniki. Department of Philosophy, History and Archaeology.
- Vryonis, Speros (1971). The Decline of Medieval Hellenism in Asia Minor and the Process of Islamization from the Eleventh through the Fifteenth Century. University of California Press. ISBN 0-520-01597-5.
- Yakupoğlu, Cevdet (2022). Malazgirt Savaşı Öncesi Anadolu'ya Yapılan Türk Akınları (in Turkish). Boğaziçi Yayınları.
