= Battle of Sebasteia (1070) =

1070 battle between Byzantines and Turkomans

- Part of Byzantine–Seljuk wars
Date	1070
Location	Sebasteia, modern day Sivas
Result	Navekkiye victory

Belligerents
Byzantine Empire	Navekkiye tribe

Commanders and leaders
Manuel Komnenos (POW); Nikephoros Melissenos (POW); Michael Taronites (POW)	Erbasgan

Strength
Unknown	Many

Casualties and losses
Unknown; 3,000 captured	Unknown

The Battle of Sebasteia (1070) was a military engagement of the Byzantine–Seljuk wars, fought near the city of Sebasteia between a Byzantine detachment under Manuel Komnenos and a Turkoman Navekkiye army led by the Emir Erbasgan.

== Prelude ==
In 1070, the Byzantine emperor, Romanos IV Diogenes, appointed the Proedros Manuel Komnenos, the nephew of the former emperor, Isaac I Komnenos, as a general to the Byzantine armies in Anatolia against the Seljuks. Initially, Manuel achieved some success, thwarting a Seljuk attack against Iconium with a counterattack. While he was withdrawing to the city of Hierapolis, he learned that a group of Seljuks under Erbasgan was raiding Byzantine territory in the Armeniakon Theme.

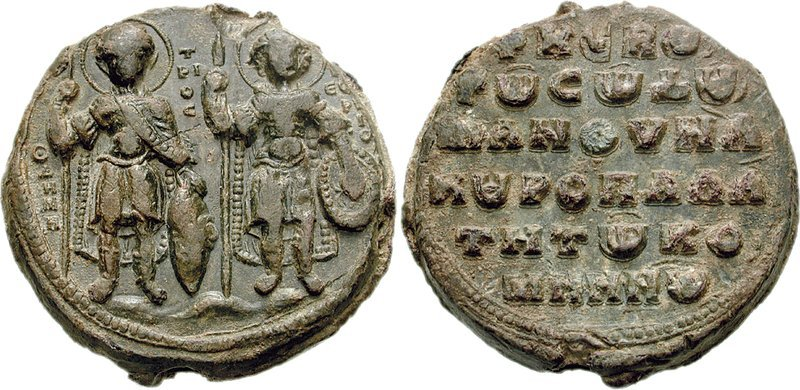
Lead seal of Manuel Komnenos, depicting Saints Demetrius and George

Erbasgan was the brother-in-law of the Seljuk Sultan Alp Arslan, and had openly revolted against him. Alp Arslan had defeated him and forced him to retreat with his men into Cappadocia. There, he encountered the Byzantine force led by Manuel close to the city of Sebasteia.

== Battle ==
Manuel rushed his force to repel the Seljuks. Following an initial battle close to Sebasteia, the Turkomans staged a feigned retreat. After approaching the deserted enemy camp, the Byzantines were ambushed, and many of their troops were killed. The survivors of the ambush retreated behind the walls of Sebasteia. Manuel Komnenos and his subcommanders were captured. According to Matthew of Edessa, 3,000 Byzantine soldiers were captured in total. He also states that the Armenian princes Atom and Abu Sahl allied themselves with Erbasgan following the battle.

During his captivity, Manuel managed to convince Erbasgan to join the Byzantines, as Alp Arslan had dispatched a force under Afshin to chase him. Both of them set off for Constantinople, and after a pursuit by Afshin, successfully reached the capital.

== Aftermath ==
=== Reception to Constantinople ===
Erbasgan was honoured by the Byzantine Emperor Romanos IV Diogenes with gifts and titles. He gave the Byzantines information regarding Seljuk politics and battle tactics, converted to Christianity and was renamed to Chrysoskoulos. According to Turkish researcher Selcuk Akyildiz: "This was the first time a Seljuk dignitary had sought refuge in Byzantium".

Afshin pursued Manuel and Chrysoskoulos, sacking multiple settlements along the way, but was unable to reach them. When he arrived at Chrysopolis, he demanded for Chrysoskoulos and his men to be given to him, but the Byzantines refused, so Afshin plundered more Byzantine lands in retaliation on his retreat. Afshin eventually reached to Khlat and informed Alp Arslan about Chrysoskoulos' defection.

=== Expedition of 1071 ===
According to Matthew of Edessa, when the army of Romanos reached Sebasteia during his third expedition against the Seljuks, they discovered the dead bodies left from the battle. At first, the emperor was welcomed by the Armenian lords, but relations soon became strained when the local Byzantines came to the emperor and complained that the Armenians had "destroyed them more than the Turks". When Romanos heard this, he ordered for his army to pillage Sebasteia in revenge. However, the emperor stopped the looting once Chrysoskoulos defended the Armenians, saying that those who had survived the battle against him had continued to aid the emperor afterwards. Modern historians however consider the account exaggerated.

== Bibliography ==
- Akyıldız, Selçuk (2023). Anadolu'yu Fetheden Selçuklu Komutanları ve Emirleri (Thesis) (in Turkish). Dokuz Eylül Üniversitesi.
- Matthew of Edessa's Chronicle Volume II. Translated by Bedrosian, Robert. Sophene. 2017. ISBN 978-1-925937-71-8.
- Beihammer, Alexander Daniel (2017-02-17). Byzantium and the Emergence of Muslim-Turkish Anatolia, ca. 1040-1130. Routledge. ISBN 978-1-351-98385-3.
- Elizabeth, Vasilakidou (2009). The Reign of Romanos IV Diogenes (1068-1071) (PDF) (Thesis) (in Greek). Aristotle University of Thessaloniki. Department of Philosophy, History and Archaeology.
- Grant, R. G. (2005). Battle a Visual Journey Through 5000 Years of Combat. London: Dorling Kindersley. p. 77. ISBN 1-74033-593-7.
- Kaldellis, Anthony (2024). The New Roman Empire: A History of Byzantium. Oxford University Press. ISBN 978-0-19-754932-2.
- Kaldellis, Anthony (2017). Streams of Gold, Rivers of Blood: The Rise and Fall of Byzantium, 955 A.D. to the First Crusade. Oxford University Press. ISBN 978-0190253226.
- Leveniotis, Georgios Athanasios (2007). The Political Collapse of Byzantium in the East: The Eastern Frontier and Central Asia Minor During the Second Half of the 11th Century (PhD thesis) (in Greek). Aristotle University of Thessaloniki. doi:10.12681/eadd/19246. hdl:10442/hedi/19246.
- Sevim, Ali; Merçil, Erdoğan (1995). Selçuklu Devletleri Tarihi: Siyaset, Teşkilat ve Kültür (in Turkish). Ankara: Türk Tarih Kurumu. ISBN 978-975-16-0690-7.
- Varzos, Konstantinos (1984). Η Γενεαλογία των Κομνηνών [The Genealogy of the Komnenoi] (PDF) (in Greek). Vol. A1. Thessaloniki: Centre for Byzantine Studies, University of Thessaloniki.
- Vryonis, Speros (1971). The Decline of Medieval Hellenism in Asia Minor and the Process of Islamization from the Eleventh through the Fifteenth Century. University of California Press. ISBN 0-520-01597-5.
- Yakupoğlu, Cevdet (2022). Malazgirt Savaşı Öncesi Anadolu'ya Yapılan Türk Akınları (in Turkish). Boğaziçi Yayınları.
