= Manuel Komnenos (kouropalates) =

11th-century Byzantine aristocrat and military leader

- Μανουήλ Κομνηνός
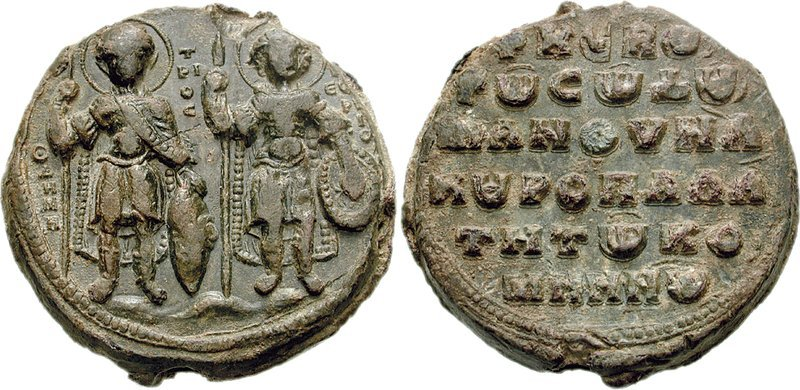
- Lead seal of Manuel Komnenos with his title of kouropalates, showing the military saints Demetrius of Thessalonica and Saint George
- Born: c. 1045
- Died: 17 April 1071
- Relatives: John Komnenos (Father), Anna Dalassene (Mother), Alexios I Komnenos and Isaac Komnenos (Brothers), Alexios Charon (Grandfather), Manuel Erotikos Komnenos (Grandfather)
- Military career
- Conflicts: Byzantine–Seljuk wars; Alp Arslan's raids into Anatolia; Battle of Iconium; Battle of Sebasteia (POW)

Manuel Komnenos (Greek: Μανουήλ Κομνηνός, romanized: Manouēl Komnēnos; c. 1045 – 17 April 1071) was a Byzantine aristocrat and military leader, the oldest son of John Komnenos and brother of the future emperor Alexios I Komnenos. A relative, by marriage, of Emperor Romanos IV Diogenes, he was placed in charge of expeditions against Seljuk raids from 1070, until his sudden death by illness in April 1071.

== Origin and marriage ==
Manuel was the first-born child of John Komnenos and his wife Anna Dalassene. The date of his birth is unknown, but he was described as a youth in 1068, so he must have been born around 1045. He was named after his grandfather, Manuel Erotikos Komnenos. As a child, as was customary for children of the Byzantine aristocracy, Manuel was trained in warfare by his father, who at the time was domestikos ton scholon (commander-in-chief) of the eastern field army.

In 1057, his uncle, Isaac I Komnenos, became emperor, but abdicated in 1059 and was succeeded by Constantine X Doukas (r. 1059–1067) after Manuel's father refused to take the throne. Manuel's mother, Anna Dalassene, refused to acquiesce to her husband's decision, however, and developed a deep enmity towards the Doukas family. After John died in 1067, she began plotting against the Doukas with the ultimate aim of raising one of her sons to the throne. She thus backed the assumption of power by Romanos IV Diogenes (r. 1068–1071), and soon after, married both Manuel and his sister Theodora to relatives of the new emperor as a sign of their political alliance. By 1068, Manuel held the high court rank of protoproedros, and on the occasion of his marriage, Diogenes promoted him further to kouropalates. The couple had at least one daughter, most likely named Anna, after Manuel's mother.

== Military career ==
The emperor also gave Manuel the military rank of protostrator—a dignity that by this time had grown in importance sufficiently to only be awarded to individuals of exceptionally high social standing. Manuel was also made commander-in-chief (strategos autokrator) of the eastern field army, although unlike his father he does not appear to have held the corresponding rank of domestikos ton scholon. In this capacity, Manuel confronted the raids of the Seljuks into eastern Asia Minor. He successfully defended much of Cappadocia, and defeated Afshin at the Battle of Iconium in 1069.

However, in the Battle of Sebasteia in 1070, he pressed ahead to the enemy camp, and was captured after a bitter struggle. He was captured with his two lieutenants, and brothers-in-law, Michael Taronites and Nikephoros Melissenos. Brought before the Turkoman leader, a certain Arisighi (later known as Chrysoskoulos), Manuel managed to convince him to join the Byzantines, as he had already rebelled against Alp Arslan. Chrysoskoulos and Manuel avoided the Seljuk forces of Afshin and reached the Byzantine capital of Constantinople, where Diogenes received them with much honour. Chrysoskoulos was given gifts by the emperor, and gave the Byzantines information regarding Seljuk internal politics and battle tactics, and converted to Christianity.

== Death ==
In spring 1071, Manuel and Chrysoskoulos went on campaign together against the Seljuks, but in Bithynia Manuel fell severely ill with an ear infection. His mother hurried to his side at the monastery of Theotokos of Alypos on Mount Azalas, but arrived barely in time for him to bid her farewell before he died. Chrysoskoulos, who had become his friend, also mourned him and was so upset he wished to die himself.

According to the early 12th-century typikon (foundational charter) of the Monastery of Christ Philanthropos, founded by Empress Irene Doukaina, wife of Manuel's younger brother Alexios I Komnenos , he died on 17 April (the day when he is commemorated). In the typikon, he is listed as sebastos, one of the most exalted court ranks at the time the typikon was written, but this is an anachronism reflecting later practice.

== Sources ==
- Garland, Lynda (1999). Byzantine Empresses: Women and Power in Byzantium, AD 527–1204. London and New York: Routledge. ISBN 978-0-415-14688-3.
- Guilland, Rodolphe (1967). "Le Domestique des Scholes". Recherches sur les institutions byzantines, Tome I (in French). Berlin: Akademie-Verlag. pp. 426–468.
- Guilland, Rodolphe (1967). "Le Protostrator". Recherches sur les institutions byzantines, Tome I (in French). Berlin: Akademie-Verlag. pp. 478–497.
- Kouroupou, Matoula; Vannier, Jean-François (2005). "Commémoraisons des Comnènes dans le typikon liturgique du monastère du Christ Philanthrope (ms. Panaghia Kamariotissa 29)" [Commemorations of the Komnenoi in the liturgical typikon of the Monastery of Christ Philanthropos (ms. Panaghia Kamariotissa 29)]. Revue des études byzantines (in French). 63: 41–69. doi:10.3406/rebyz.2005.2305.
- Kaldellis, Anthony (2017). Streams of Gold, Rivers of Blood: The Rise and Fall of Byzantium, 955 A.D. to the First Crusade. Oxford University Press. ISBN 978-0190253226.
- Varzos, Konstantinos (1984). Η Γενεαλογία των Κομνηνών [The Genealogy of the Komnenoi] (PDF) (in Greek). Vol. A1. Thessaloniki: Centre for Byzantine Studies, University of Thessaloniki.
- Neville, Leonora (2012). Heroes and Romans in Twelfth-Century Byzantium. The Material for History of Nikephoros Bryennios. Cambridge University Press. ISBN 978-1-107-00945-5.
- Vryonis, Speros (1971). The Decline of Medieval Hellenism in Asia Minor and the Process of Islamization from the Eleventh through the Fifteenth Century. University of California Press. ISBN 0-520-01597-5.
