= Battle of Iconium (1069) =

Byzantine-Seljuk battle near Iconium

- Part of the Byzantine–Seljuk wars
Date	1069
Location	Near Iconium, modern day Konya
Result	Byzantine victory

Belligerents
Byzantine Empire	Seljuk Empire

Commanders and leaders
Manuel Komnenos	Afshin

Strength
Unknown	Unknown

Casualties and losses
Unknown	Unknown

The Battle of Iconium was an unsuccessful attempt by the Seljuk Empire to capture the Byzantine city of Iconium, during Alp Arslan's raids into Anatolia.

When the Byzantine emperor Romanos IV Diogenes was busy campaigning in Hierapolis against the Mirdasids (who were allies of the Seljuks), the Turkoman commander Afshin, who had previously sacked the cities of Caesarea and Amorium, attempted to attack Iconium. There, the general Manuel Komnenos, counter-attacked him and defeated him in battle in late 1069.

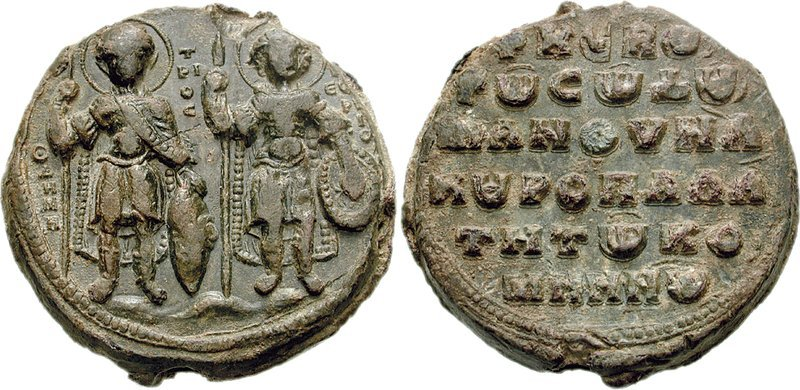
Lead seal of Manuel Komnenos, depicting Saints Demetrius and George

However, Afshin returned a few months later and defeated the commander Philaretos Brachamios near Melitene, after which he sacked Iconium.

== Sources ==
- Finlay, George (1854), History of the Byzantine and Greek Empires from 1057 to 1453, vol. 2, William Blackwood & Sons
- Grant, R. G. (2005). Battle a Visual Journey Through 5000 Years of Combat. London: Dorling Kindersley. p. 77. ISBN 1-74033-593-7.
- Kaldellis, Anthony (2017). Streams of Gold, Rivers of Blood: The Rise and Fall of Byzantium, 955 A.D. to the First Crusade. Oxford University Press. ISBN 978-0-19-754932-2.
- Lock, Peter (2006). The Routledge Companion to the Crusades. Routledge. ISBN 978-1135131371.
