= Temenothyra =

Ancient city of Asia Minor

Coordinates: 38°40′56″N 29°24′29″E

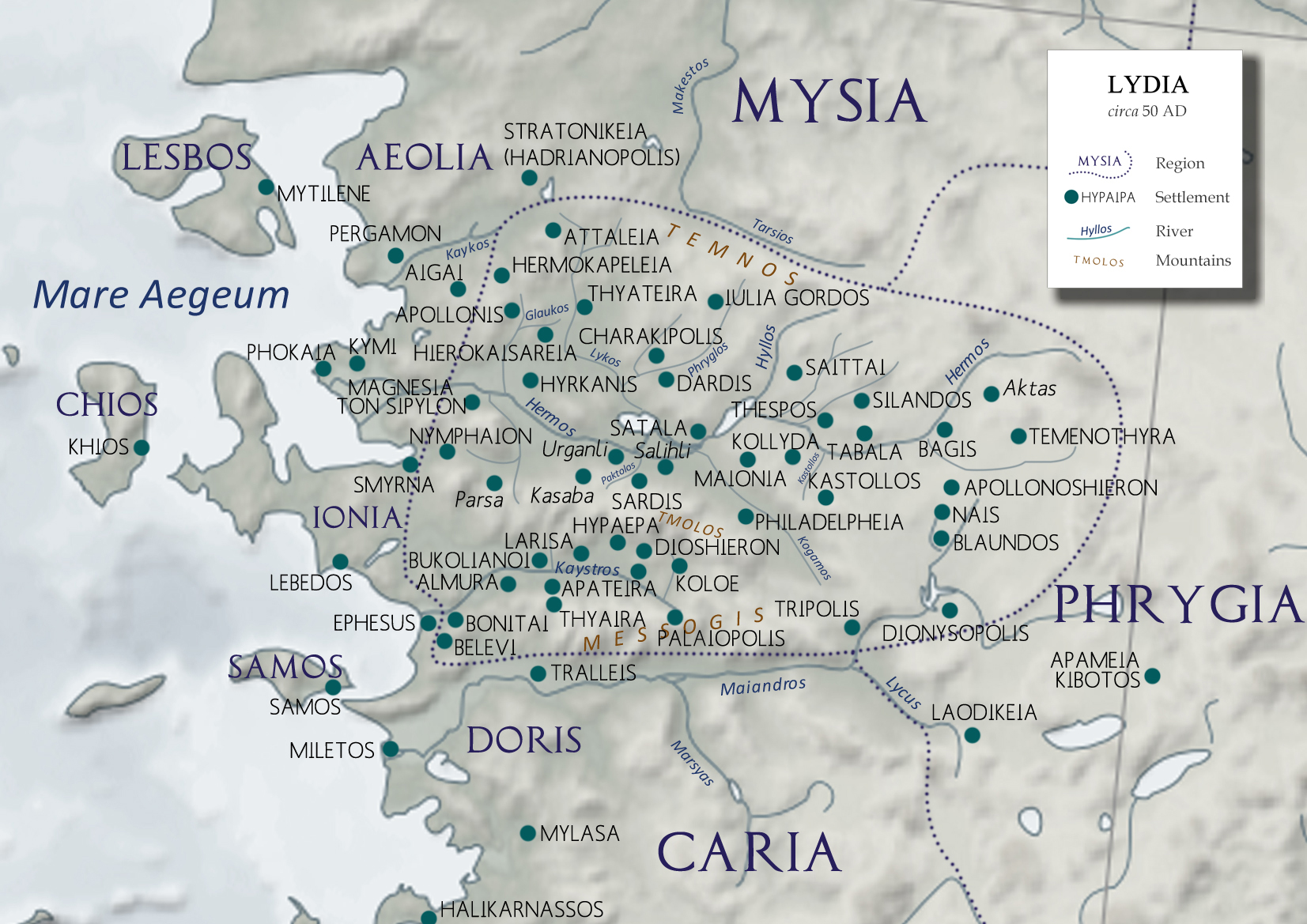
Lydia in about 50 CE.

Temenothyra (Ancient Greek: Τημενοθύρα), or Temenothyrae or Temenothyrai (Ancient Greek: Τημενοθύραι or Τημένου θύραι, romanized: Temenou Thyrae, Temenouthyrai), was a town of ancient Lydia, or of Phrygia, inhabited during Roman and Byzantine times. It is now Uşak, Turkey.

It became a bishopric; no longer the seat of a residential bishop, Temenothyrae is now a titular see of the Roman Catholic Church.
