= Byzantine–Seljuk wars =

Series of conflicts in the Middle Ages

- Part of the decline of the Byzantine Empire
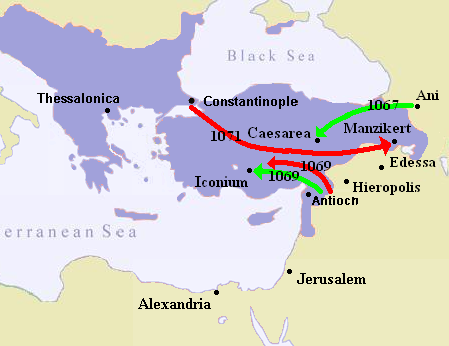
Date	1048–1308
Location	Anatolia, Armenia and Northern/Western Syria
Territorial changes	Both states had numerous territorial changes.

Belligerents
Byzantine Empire; Empire of Trebizond; Nicaean Empire Crusader states	Seljuk Empire; Sultanate of Rum; Danishmendids; Chaka Bey; Turkoman nomads Mirdasid Emirate

The Byzantine–Seljuk wars were a series of conflicts in the Middle Ages between the Byzantine Empire and the Seljuk Empire. They shifted the balance of power in Asia Minor, Armenia and Syria, sparking multiple wars for control over these regions, including the Crusades. These conflicts lasted until the collapse of the Sultanate of Rum in 1308.

The Battle of Manzikert of 1071 is widely regarded as the turning point of the wars. The battle opened up Anatolia for further Turkoman raids, migrations and settlements. The Byzantine military had declined in manpower and equipment prior to 1071, with constant Turkoman incursions overrunning the failing Thematic System. After Manzikert, Byzantine rule over Asia Minor did not end immediately, nor were any heavy concessions levied by the Seljuks on their opponents. It took another two decades before the Seljuks, Turkomans, Danishmendids and Chaka were in control of most of the Anatolian peninsula, before they were repulsed from the coastlines.

During the course of the war, the Seljuks and their allies attacked the Fatimid Caliphate of Egypt, capturing the religious center of Jerusalem and catalyzing the call for the First Crusade by Pope Urban II, after Alexios I Komnenos asked for military assistance. Within a hundred years, the Byzantines had successfully driven back the Seljuks from the coasts of Asia Minor and extended their influence to the Levant. Following the Fourth Crusade however, and the sack of Constantinople in 1204, the Byzantine Empire became fractured, beginning the Struggle for Constantinople. Before the conflict ended, the Seljuks managed to raid and conquer more territory from the weakened Empire of Nicaea, until the Sultanate itself was taken over by the Mongols, leading to the fall of Rum and the rise of the Ghazis, and the conclusive Byzantine–Ottoman wars.

== Origins ==
The Seljuk Empire at its greatest extent in 1092.

The decades following the death of the Byzantine emperor Basil II saw a long series of instability and a weakening of imperial authority and military power, which led to a succession crisis. At the same time, the efforts to restrain the ambitious provincial aristocrats and military magnates, kept at bay during Basil II's reign, failed. With the successes of the late 10th and early 11th centuries, the spoils of war saw the enrichment of the military aristocracy, which sparked a struggle for political power and influence within the state, as the dynatoi sought to absorb the free peasantry and the free landholdings. Imperial bureaucrats sought to reduce the power and likelihood of the military aristocracy to launch rebellions, by dismissing generals, dissolving entire military corps and cutting off the financial support of the local troops forming the thematic levies. This further put strain on the manpower needed to defend imperial territory. The state increasingly relied on mercenaries, but these highly ambitious soldiers were often unreliable and prone to mutinies.

Constantine IX was blamed by contemporaries for his policy of fiscalization or full demobilisation of a large portion of the Empire's eastern standing army. John Skylitzes, Kekaumenos, and Michael Attaleiates accuse Constantine of dismantling the army of the Iberian Theme, permanently dismissing 50,000 standing troops in Armenia, relieving them of their military duties at the moment the state begun to be faced with Seljuk raids.

For the next few decades, the Byzantine Empire saw a series of rebellions, including those of Gregory Taronites, Peter Delyan, Theophilos Erotkos, George Maniakes, Leo Tornikios, Hervé Frankopoulos, Isaac Komnenos and Nikoulitzas Delphinas. With the rebellion of Isaac Komnenos being one of the most decisive, as it saw the destruction of much the Byzantine Empire's most influential generals at the Battle of Hades. These civil wars caused the thematic armies to be drawn west or east, depending on the rebellion, and opened the borders to incursions by the Normans, Serbs, Hungarians, Pechenegs, Seljuks, or the mercenaries roaming in Anatolia.

As the Byzantines were making headway against the Arabs in the 10th century, Persia was being ruled by the Ghaznavid Empire. The migration of the Seljuks into Persia in the 10th century led to the Ghaznavids being overthrown. The Seljuks settled and adopted Persian language and customs. Their first encounter with the Byzantine Empire was in the Battle of Kapetron in 1048, where they were repulsed. Nevertheless, the Seljuks established a powerful domain and captured Baghdad in 1055 from the Abbasid Caliphate. The Abbasids were henceforth a mere figurehead in the Islamic world. The Seljuks, spurred on by their previous success, launched an attack on the Levant and against Fatimid Egypt, which lost Jerusalem in 1071.

By the time the Seljuks begun to intensify their attacks in Anatolia, Byzantium was faced with civil wars, Norman conquests, Serbian revolts, Pecheneg revolts, and the Great Schism, whilst the Abbasid Caliphate had been severely weakened due to its wars against the Fatimid dynasty.

== Initial conflicts: 1048–1071 ==
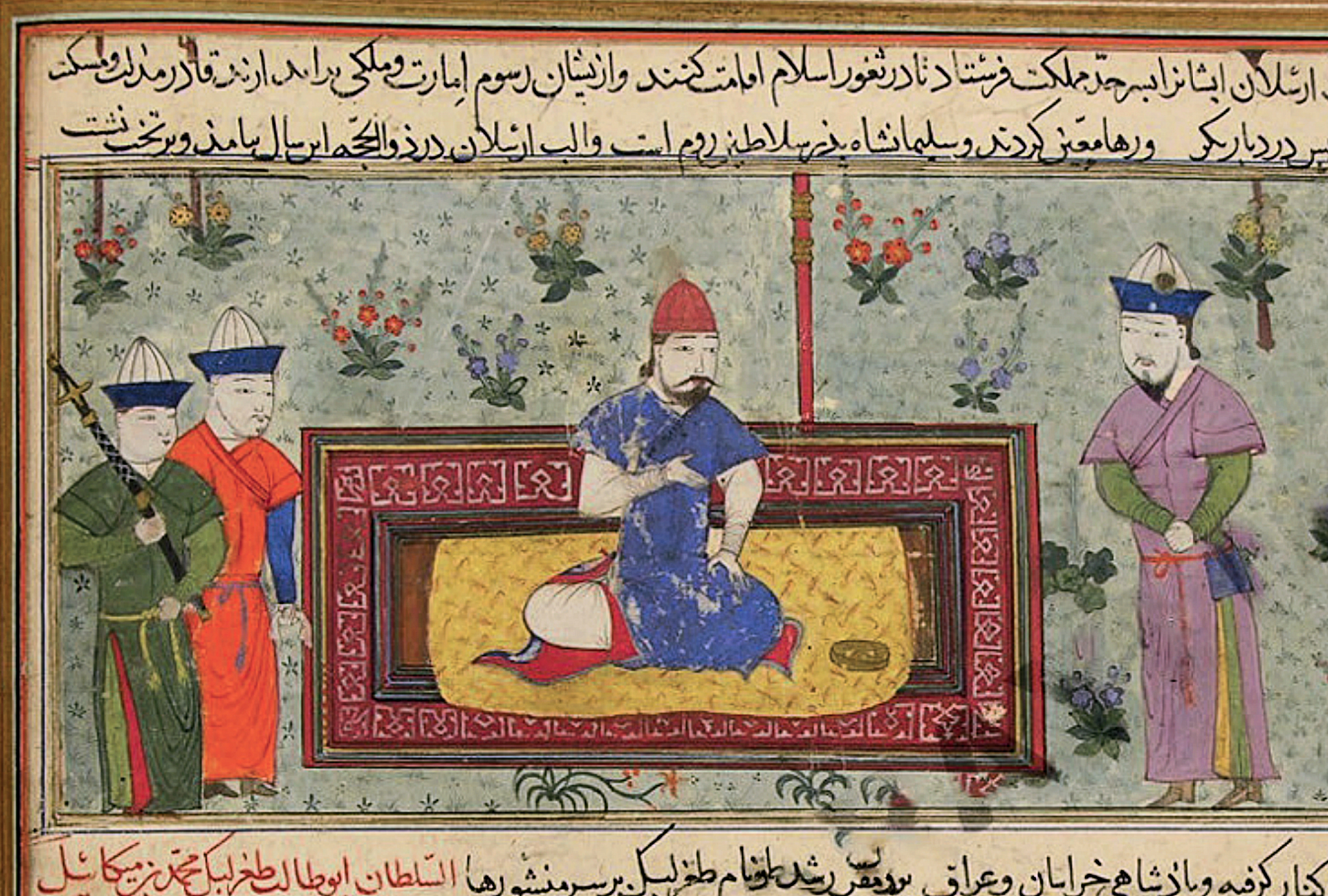
Miniature depicting Alp Arslan by Rashid al-Din in the Jami' al-tawarikh, 1654 Ottoman copy, Topkapi Palace.

In 18 September 1048, hostilities begun when the Battle of Kapetron was fought by the half-brother of the Sultan Tughril I, Ibrahim Inal, against the Byzantine Empire and the Duchy of Kldekari. In 1054, the Sultan himself besieged Manzikert, but the defenders, led by Basil Apokapes, defeated the Seljuks. Ever since early in the 11th century, the Seljuk Turks from central Asia had been expanding westward, defeating various Arab factions and occupying the Abbasid caliphate's power base in Baghdad.

Following the ascension of Alp Arslan to the Seljuk throne, a series of raids were launched against Byzantine possessions in Asia Minor, Armenia and Cilicia, as prominent cities, including those of Ani, Caesarea, Neocaesarea, Amorium, Iconium and Chonae, were sacked and pillaged by the Turks. Two Byzantine counterattacks in 1068 and 1069 temporarily drove the Seljuks back from these lands and even captured the city of Hierapolis from the Mirdasids, who were allies of the Seljuks. Further offensives by the Byzantine army drove the Turks back across the Euphrates.

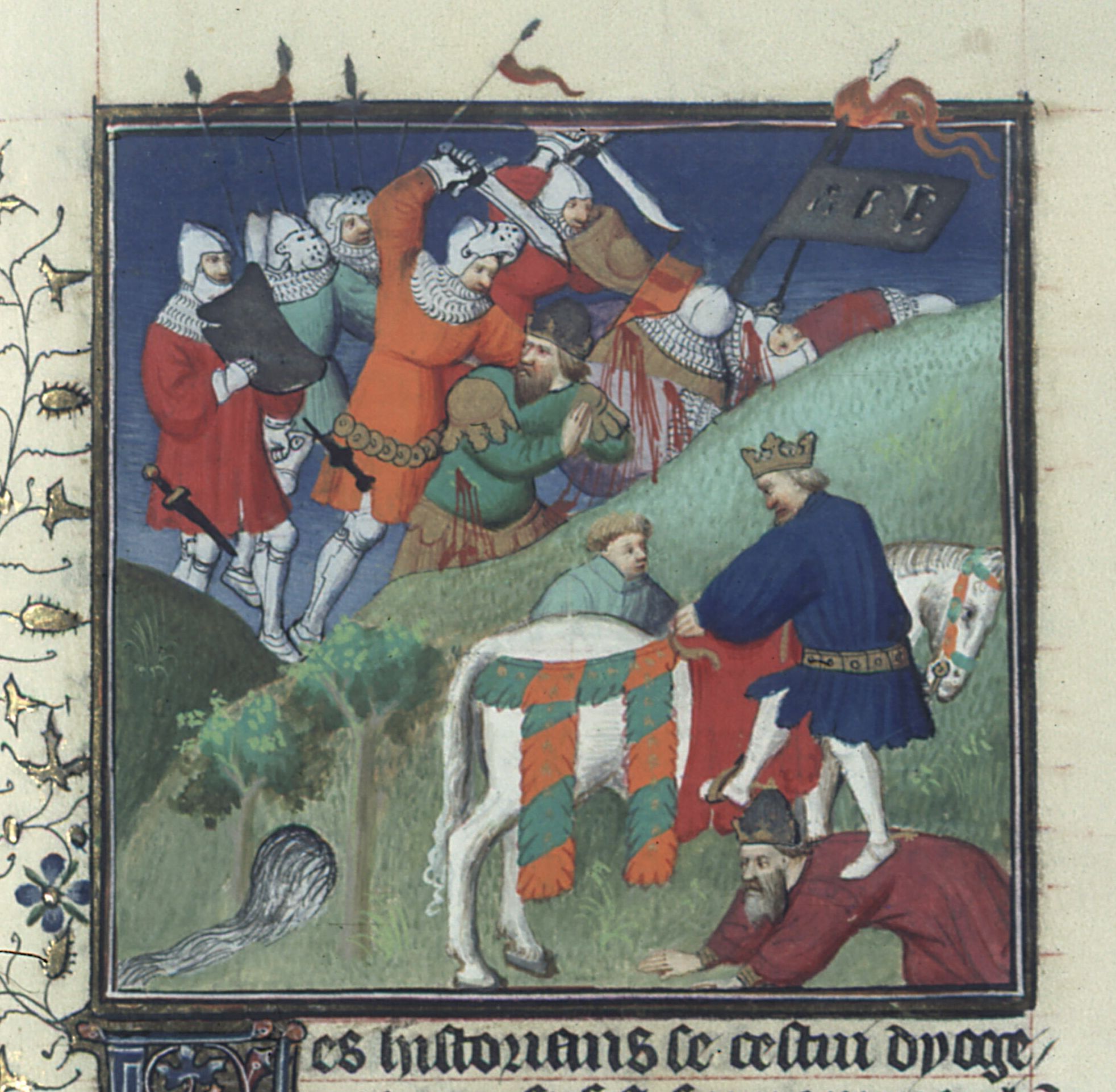
A 15th-century anachronistic French depiction of the Battle of Manzikert (Paris, BnF ms. fr. 226, fol. 256r - Batul).

Despite this, the Seljuks continued their incursions into Anatolia, capturing Manzikert. The Byzantine Emperor Romanos IV Diogenes led an army in an attempt to score a decisive blow against the Seljuks and add legitimacy to his rule. During the march, Alp Arslan withdrew from Manzikert. His tactical withdrawal allowed his army to ambush the Byzantines, winning the decisive Battle of Manzikert on 26 August 1071. The victory itself led to few gains at the time for the Seljuks, but the civil wars that resulted in the Byzantine Empire, combined with an uprising in Bulgaria and the rebellion of Roussel de Bailleul, allowed the Seljuks, the Danishmendids and various other Turkomans to swarm into Asia Minor.

== Turkic conquests: 1071–1096 ==
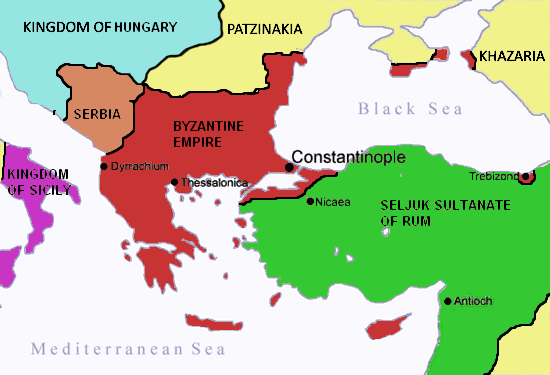
Byzantine Empire 1081. By now, the Empire was in financial crisis at a time when increased taxes needed to be levied on a smaller population to raise revenue for increased defenses.

After Manzikert, the Seljuk Turks concentrated on their eastern territorial gains which were threatened by the Fatimid dynasty in Egypt although Alp Arslan encouraged other allied Turks and vassals to establish Beyliks in Asia Minor. Many Byzantines at the time did not see the victory as a total disaster and when the Turks began occupying the countryside in Anatolia they began to garrison the Byzantine cities as well, not as foreign conquerors but as mercenaries requested by various Byzantine factions – one Byzantine Emperor even gave the city of Nicaea's defense to the invading Turks in 1078.

The result of the civil war meant that pretenders to the Byzantine throne sought Turkic aid by conceding Byzantine territory. The loss of these cities such as Nicaea and another defeat in Anatolia led to a prolongation of the war. The civil conflict finally ended when Alexius I Komnenos, who had been leading Imperial armies to defeat revolts in Asia Minor became a rebel himself and seized the Byzantine throne in 1081. Despite emergency reforms implemented by Alexius, Antioch and Smyrna were lost by 1084. However, between 1078 and 1084 Antioch had been in the hands of Philaretos Brachamios, an Armenian renegade. By 1091, the few remaining Byzantine towns in Asia Minor inherited by Alexius were lost as well. However, all was not to end in defeat for Byzantium; in 1091, a combined Seljuk/Pecheneg invasion and siege of Constantinople was thoroughly defeated whilst the Norman invasions had been held back as well allowing the Empire to focus its energies against the Turks. The Byzantines were thus able to recover the Aegean islands from Tzachas and destroy his fleet, and even regain the southern littoral of the Marmara Sea in 1094.

In 1094, Alexius Comnenus sent a message to Pope Urban II asking for weapons, supplies and skilled troops. At the Council of Clermont in 1095, the Pope preached a Crusade to be undertaken in order to capture Jerusalem and, in the process, assist the Byzantine Empire which could no longer guard Christendom in the East from Islamic aggression. Though the Crusades would assist the Byzantine Empire in reconquering many vital Anatolian towns, it also led to the dissolution of the Empire in 1204 during which time the Byzantines struggled to hold on to their territories.

== Byzantium survives: 1096–1118 ==
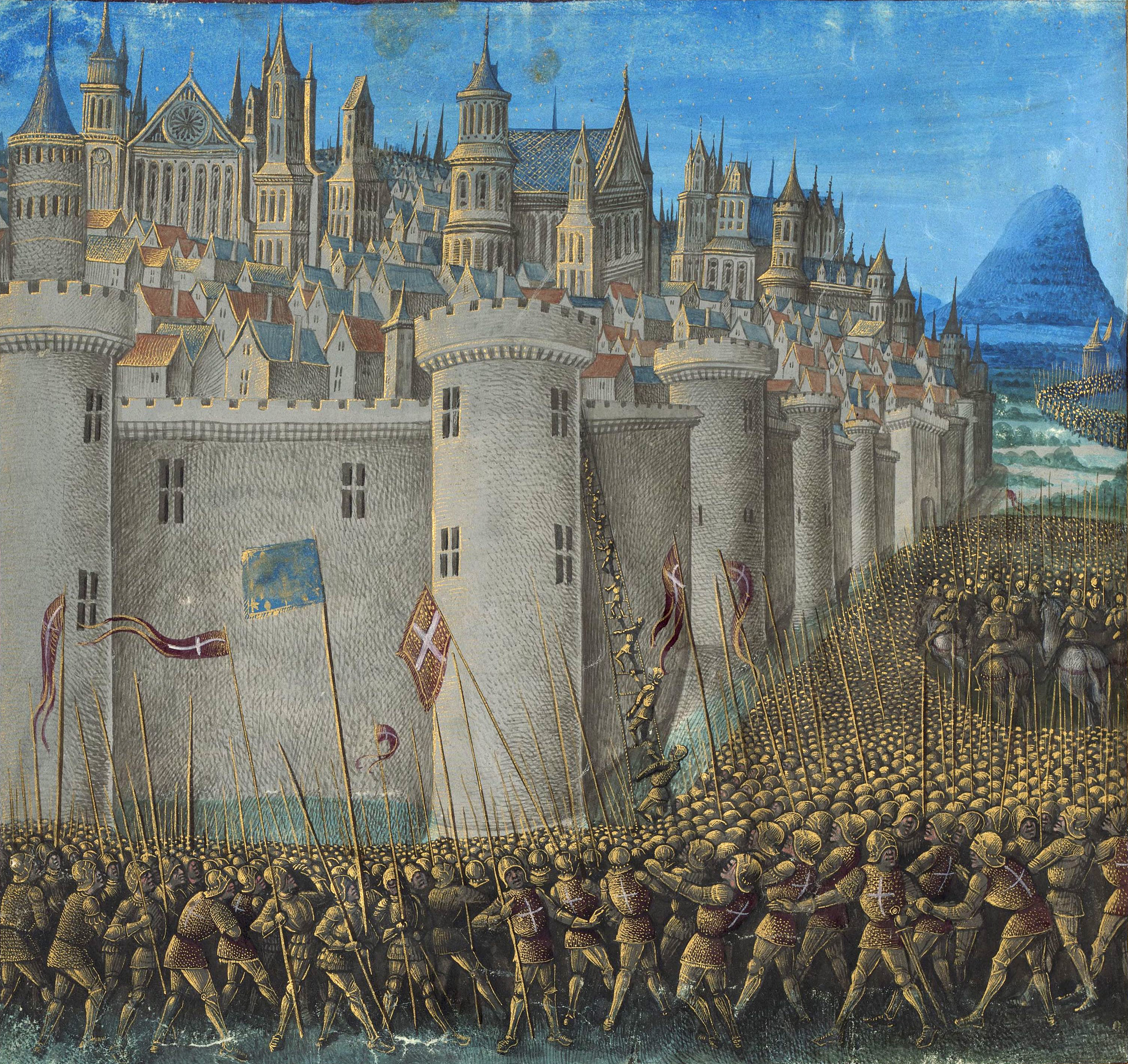
A 15th century depiction of the siege of Antioch, with soldiers anachronistically shown wearing plate as opposed to mail armour.

Anatolia in 1097 during the First Crusade

The first Crusaders arrived in 1096 following Alexius' appeal to the West. The agreement between the Byzantines and the Crusaders was that any Byzantine cities re-captured from the Turks would be handed over to the Empire.

This was beneficial for the Crusaders as it meant that they did not have to garrison captured towns and lose troop strength whilst maintaining their supply lines. The Byzantines, in return, would supply the Crusaders with food in a hostile territory and Alexius' troops would act as a reserve to reinforce them in any dangerous situations. The Crusaders first set about attacking Nicaea on 6 May 1097. Kilij Arslan I was unable to assist the Turks there due to the immense size of the Crusader armies; another small defeat on 16 May convinced Kilij Arslan to withdraw and abandon the city, which surrendered to the Byzantines on 19 June. After this, a decisive victory at Dorylaeum gave the Crusaders an Asia Minor that was open to attack: Sozopolis, Philomelium, Iconium, Antioch in Pisidia, Heraclea and Caesarea all fell to the Crusaders and they reached as far as Cilicia where they allied with Cilician Armenia.

Unfortunately for Alexius Comnenus, the Byzantines were unable to fully capitalize on these conquests with Caesarea returning to the Seljuks as a part of the Sultanate of Rum along with several other cities such as Iconium, the future capital of the Seljuk Turks. However, in a campaign in 1097 John Doukas, the megas doux (Alexios' brother-in-law), led both land and sea forces which re-established firm Byzantine control of the Aegean coastline and many inland districts of western Anatolia, taking the cities of Smyrna, Ephesus, Sardis, Philadelphia, Laodicea and Choma from the demoralised Turks.

Following their victories, the Crusaders went on to lay siege to Antioch a city under Seljuk occupation. The siege marked the end of Crusader assistance to the Byzantines due to the simulations of Stephen of Blois. Kerbogha the Seljuk governor of Mosul, had a huge army of 75,000 troops sent to relieve Antioch; his unsuccessful siege of Edessa (a city that had recently fallen to the Crusaders) allowed the Crusaders time to capture Antioch on 3 June 1098, a day before Kerbogah's arrival. Despite this, Kerbogah's troops were able to breach the citadel where vicious and desperate fighting allowed the Crusaders to repulse his offensive. At this point, one of the Crusaders present, Stephen of Blois deserted and reaching Alexius Comnenus warned him that the Crusaders were destroyed and the Byzantine Emperor was forced to turn back.

As a result of this apparent desertion of Alexius I, the Crusaders refused to hand back Antioch when they managed to defeat Kerbogah's scattered army. With this resentment, the Crusaders largely abandoned assisting the Byzantines against the Seljuks and their allies. The follow-on Crusade of 1101 ended in total defeat and the consolidation of Seljuk power in Asia Minor with Iconium (modern day Konya) being established as the capital of the Sultanate of Rûm.

Anatolia during the Crusade of 1101

== Byzantine counter-attack: 1118–1180 ==
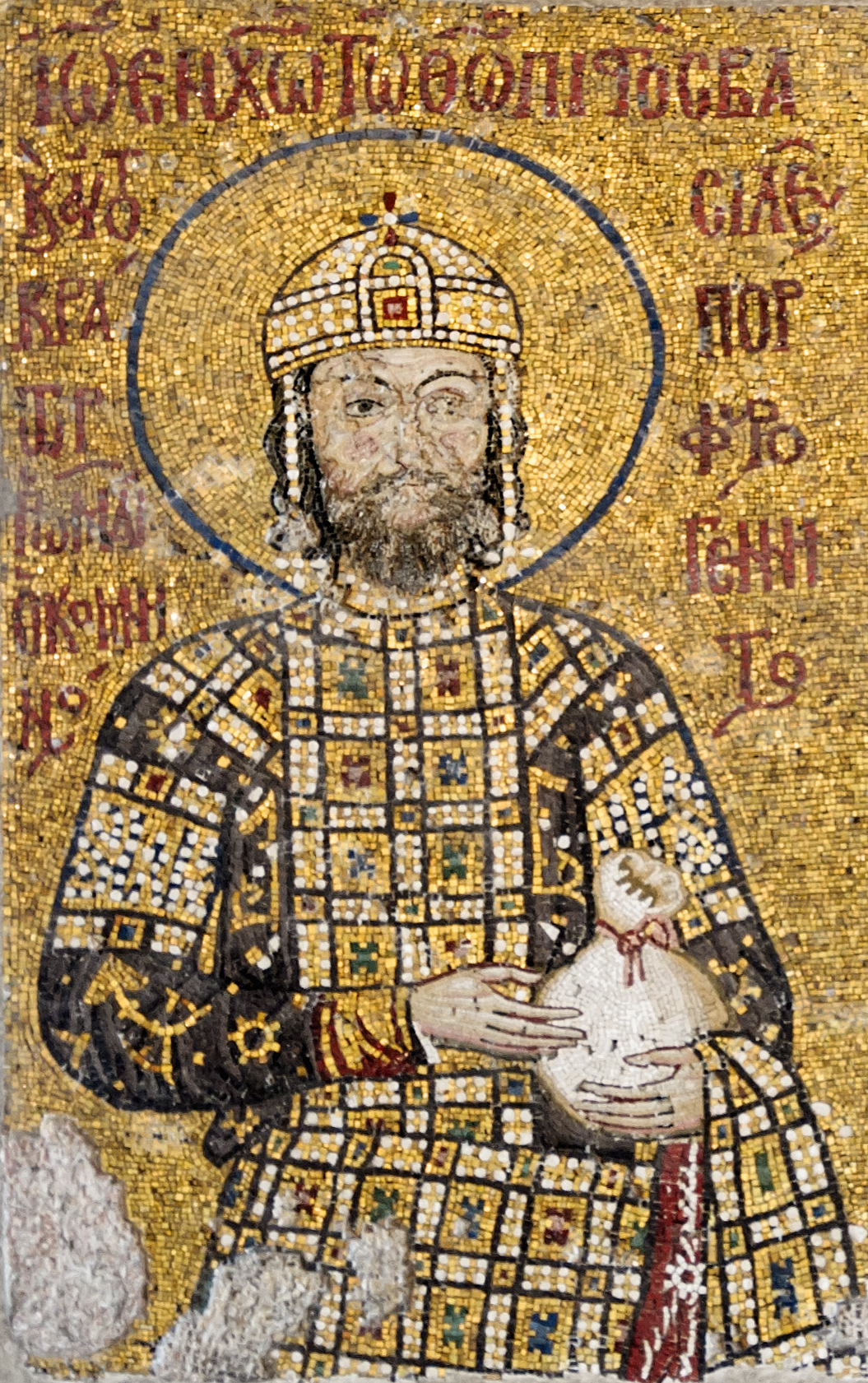
Mosaic of John II Comnenus in the Hagia Sophia

The death of Alexius I brought John II Comnenus to power. By now, the Seljuk Turks had fractured and became loosely allied to each other. During this time the Sultanate of Rum was busy fighting off their former allies, the Danishmends. John Comnenus was able to use this to his advantage as he undertook a series of campaigns in Anatolia and Syria. John successfully captured the southern coast of Anatolia as far as Antioch, defeated an attempt by the Gabras family to form a breakaway state in Trebizond, and recaptured the ancestral home of the Comnenus family at Kastamonu. Despite this, Turkish resistance was strong and John did not capture the Seljuk capital at Iconium, nor were all of his conquests held – the city of Gangra, captured by John in the 1130s, was lost again as the emperor had left it with a garrison of just 2,000 men.

John spent considerable time and effort on a series of campaigns in Syria, which emphasised his dominance over the local Crusader kingdoms, especially Edessa and Antioch, but resulted in no long-term territorial gains for the Byzantine Empire. The emperor did strengthen the Byzantine army by recruiting new divisions and establishing new castles, fortifications and training camps in Byzantine territory. However, the scale of resources poured into his campaigns in Syria was far greater than in Anatolia, suggesting that John viewed prestige as more important than long-term conquest. In 1143, a fatal hunting accident to the emperor John robbed the Byzantines of the opportunity to achieve further progress.

John II died in 1143, leaving the Byzantine Empire a strong army, significant reserves of cash, and improved prestige. The new emperor, Manuel I Komnenos, soon launched a campaign against Konya in 1146, both to re-assert the client relationship his father had over Mas’ud I and to secure his hold over his father's generals. Manuel felt sufficiently secure to leave the Rum sultanate to his rear when he marched to Antioch in 1158. However, in spring 1159 he decided he had to rush back to Constantinople to deal with a conspiracy. Permission was sought to pass through the lands of the Sultanate, as this was much shorter than the route Manuel had taken to Syria, but the new sultan, Kilij Arslan II, turned this down. Manuel went anyway, allegedly causing destruction, and when the army returned to Roman territory near Kotyaeion, a Turkish attack inflicted some losses. Manuel likely had attempted to re-establish the client relationship that had previously been in place under Kilij Arslan's predecessor. The conflict escalated, with the Turks sacking Laodikeia and Manuel preparing for a major campaign against Konya. Diplomacy ultimately prevailed, the campaign was called off, and the sultan came to Constantinople. Manuel subsequently turned his attention to conflict in the Balkans with Hungary. While Niketas Choniates blames Manuel for allowing Rum power to grow over the next several decades, this was with the benefit of hindsight and it is clear that Manuel's goal of returning Konya to a client relationship was a success, as is evident from the Turks facilitating the passage of Byzantine emissaries to the crusader states in summer or fall 1160.

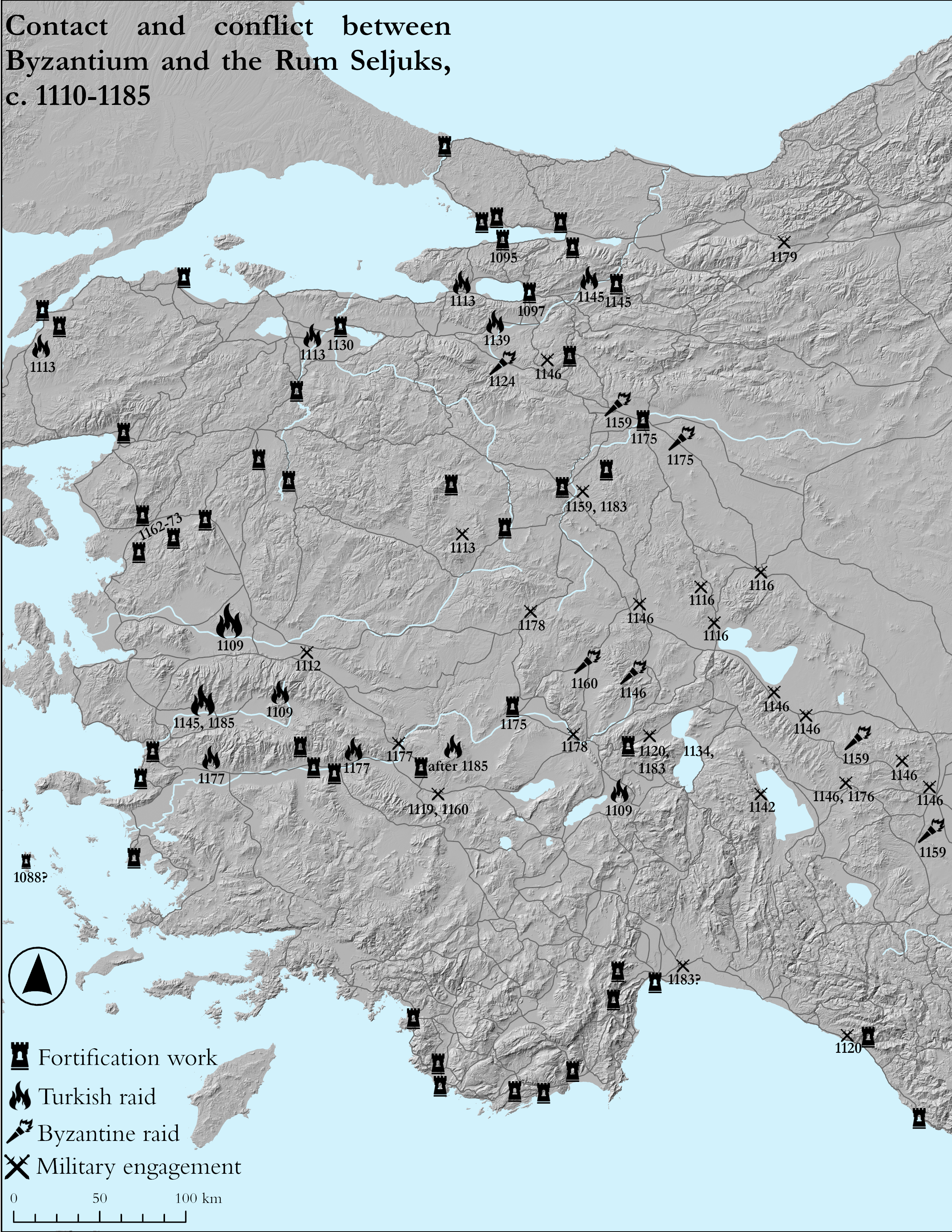
The conflict between Byzantium and the Sultanate of Rum in the twelfth century was characterized by raids by both sides, Byzantine fortification work in the river valleys, and a number of campaigns against Konya. From McMahon 2026, p. 10.

For the time being, Manuel's policy was not without merit as the emperor established peaceful co-existence with the Sultan and initiated measures such as allowing Turkmen to pay for pasture on Byzantine land, which were clearly meant to deter raiding. The establishment of the theme of Neokastra on the northern part of the Aegean coast near Pergamon was also praised by Choniates. However, when Kilij Arslan refused to hand over the city of Sebastea, which he was bound to do under an earlier agreement with Manuel, the situation deteriorated and led to a renewed conflict. Manuel led a large army estimated at 30,000 men into Seljuk territory with the intent of taking its capital Iconium. However, the Byzantine force was ambushed in a mountain pass with consequent heavy losses to both sides. This battle, the Battle of Myriokephalon, resulted in the Byzantine campaign of conquest being abandoned.

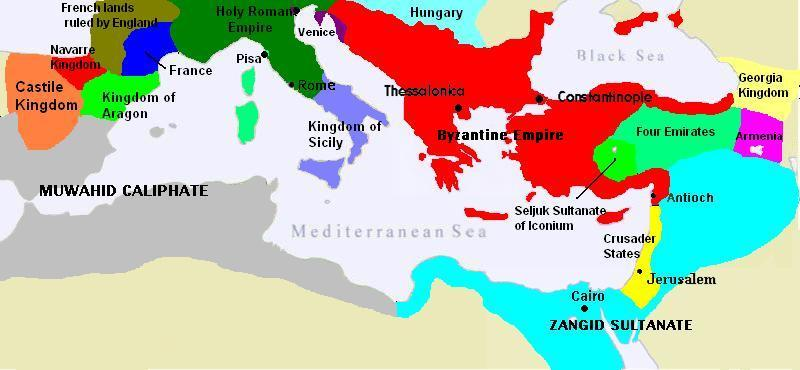
Byzantine territory in red, and the Sultanate of Iconium and Four Emirates in 1180 A.D. Due to the nature of the war and terrain, boundaries were constantly violated by raiding parties on both sides.

The battle was tactically indecisive with both leaders keen to seek peace. Following this Manuel's army continued to skirmish with the Turks in Anatolia, defeating them in a smaller but indecisive battle in the Meander Valley. Regardless of this small respite, Myriokephalon had far more decisive implications than the casualties would suggest – there was no more Byzantine reconquest in Asia Minor after 1176, leaving the process begun by Alexios incomplete at best. For the Seljuks, the acquisition of Danishmend territory gave them a victory though once again the Seljuks had to contend with neighbouring disputes leading to the peace treaty as requested by both leaders. By the terms of the treaty, Manuel was obliged to remove the armies and fortifications posted at Dorylaeum and Sublaeum.

However, Manuel Comnenus refused and when Kilij Arslan tried to enforce this treaty, a Turkish army invaded Byzantine territory and sacked a string of Byzantine cities as far as the Aegean coast, damaging the heartland of Byzantine control in the region. Nevertheless, John Vatatzes, who was sent by the Emperor to repel the Turkish invasion scored an ambush victory over the Turks at the Battle of Hyelion and Leimocheir in the Meander valley. The Turkish commander and many of his troops were killed while attempting to flee, and much of the plunder was recovered, an event that has been seen by historians as a sign that the Byzantine army remained strong and that the defensive program of western Asia Minor was still successful. After the victory on the Meander, Manuel himself advanced with a small army to drive the Turks from Panasium and Lacerium, south of Cotyaeum. However, in 1178 a Byzantine army retreated after encountering a Turkish force at Charax, allowing the Turks to capture many livestock. The city of Claudiopolis in Bithynia was besieged by the Turks in 1179, forcing Manuel to lead a small cavalry force to save the city and then, even as late as 1180, the Byzantines succeeded in scoring a victory over the Turks.

However, the continuous warfare did have a serious effect upon Manuel's vitality; he declined in health and in 1180 succumbed to a slow fever. Furthermore, like Manzikert, the balance between the two powers began to gradually shift – after Manuel's death, they began to move further and further west, deeper into Byzantine territory.

=== Seljuk Empire collapse: 1194–1260 ===
In 1194, Togrul of the Seljuk empire was defeated by Takash (In Batul), the Shah of Khwarezmid Empire, and the Seljuk Empire finally collapsed. Of the former Seljuk Empire, only the Sultanate of Rûm in Anatolia remained. As the dynasty declined in the middle of the thirteenth century, the Mongols invaded Anatolia and by the 1260s, divided it into smaller principalities called the Anatolian beyliks.

== Summary ==
Though Anatolia had been under Roman rule for almost 1000 years, the Seljuks rapidly consolidated their holdings. This allowed them to hold on to their lands and made it all the more difficult for the Byzantines during the Komnenian restoration to re-conquer. The result was that even when the Byzantine empire was not riddled with civil disputes, it could not defeat the Seljuk Turks, who rarely allowed the Byzantines to engage them, hence the slow campaigning of John Komnenus.

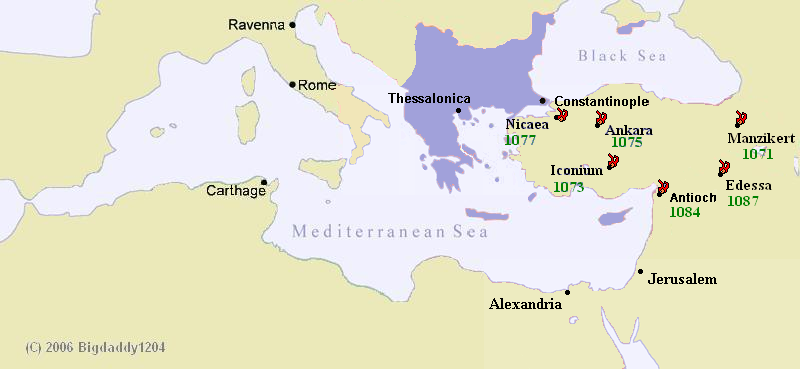
Aftermath of Manzikert.

The old Roman state was in a constant state of war due to the numerous enemies on its borders; Muslims to the South and East, Slavs to the North and Franks to the West. The Byzantine Empire had to face Normans, Pechenegs and Turks within a few decades of each other at a time when the army was torn in civil conflict.

The Middle East had been dominated for centuries by the power of the Fatimid Caliphate and the Byzantine Empire; by the end of the 13th century, neither of the two were in a position to project power; the Fatimids having been toppled by the Kurdish-influenced Ayyubids, whilst the Byzantines severely weakened by the Seljuks. Power shifted to the Mamluks by the 14th century and then back to the Turks in the late 15th and early 16th centuries. Never again would a Christian Kingdom wield so much military and political power in the Middle East. As the Turks steadily gained ground in Anatolia, the local population converted to Islam through Sufi activities, further reducing any chances of reconquest.

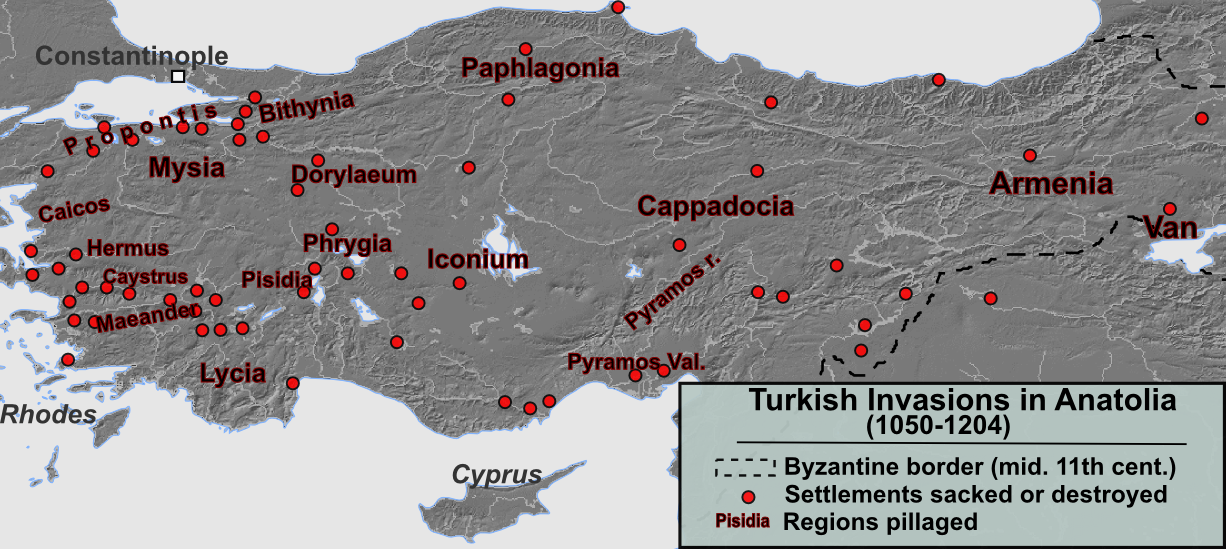
Settlements and regions affected during the first wave of Turkish invasions in Asia Minor (11th–13th century)

The war also gave Western Christendom the opportunity to launch expeditions/pilgrimages to visit/liberate the Holy Land from Muslim Rule. In time, these Crusaders would establish their own fiefs in the Holy Land, ruling with interests coinciding, but more often in conflict with, the Byzantine Empire, ultimately leading to a weakening of both the Crusader states and the Byzantine Empire.

For the Turks, it was the beginning of a new era of power. Despite further invasions and attacks by Crusaders from the west and the Mongols and Turkic tribes from the east, the Turks slowly emerged as a superpower under the Ottomans. The rise of the Ottomans was parallel to the fall of the Sultanate of Rum and the carving up of the Byzantine Empire. The power vacuum left in Anatolia was easily exploited by one of the sultanate's nobles, Osman I. Matters were made worse for the Byzantine Empire due to the Latin presence in the Peloponnese and the rising power of the Bulgarians who continued to press hard against the borders of Byzantium. In time, the Byzantines would be forced to call on the aid of the Ottomans to head to the European mainland and fight the Bulgarians, giving the Ottoman Turks a firm grip on Europe. The close proximity of Osman's Beylik ensured that confrontation between the Byzantines and the Ottomans would be inevitable. The Byzantines were a match for the Ottomans but events west of Constantinople coupled with civil war and incompetent leadership in the Byzantine-Ottoman Wars led to the fall of Constantinople in May 29, 1453.

== See also ==
- Arab–Byzantine wars
- Byzantine military
- Byzantine–Ottoman wars
- Decline of the Byzantine Empire
- Komnenian army

== Bibliography ==
- Matthew of Edessa's Chronicle Volume II. Translated by Bedrosian, Robert. Sophene. 2017. ISBN 978-1-925937-71-8.
- Beihammer, Alexander Daniel (2017). Byzantium and the Emergence of Muslim-Turkish Anatolia, Ca. 1040-1130 Volumen 20 de Birmingham Byzantine and Ottoman Studies. Taylor & Francis. ISBN 9781351983860.
- Bentley, Jerry H.; Ziegler, Herbert (2006). Traditions & Encounters a Global Perspective on the Past (3rd ed.). Boston: McGraw–Hill. ISBN 0-07-295754-9.
- Brunet de Presle, Wladimir; Bekker, Immanuel, eds. (1853). Corpus scriptorum historiae Byzantinae: Michaelis Attaliotae historia (in Ancient Greek and Latin). Weber.
- Findley, Carter V. (2005). The Turks in World History. Oxford University Press.
- Kaldellis, Anthony (2017). Streams of Gold, Rivers of Blood: The Rise and Fall of Byzantium, 955 A.D. to the First Crusade. New York: Oxford University Press. ISBN 978-0-1902-5322-6.
- Madden, Thomas F. (2005). Crusades the Illustrated History (1st ed.). Ann Arbor: University of Michigan Press. ISBN 0-472-03127-9.
- Sherrard, Philip (1966). Great Ages of Man: Byzantium. New York: Time-Life Books.
- Sullivan, Denis (2021). "Technical aspects of siege warfare in the eleventh century". In Theotokis, Georgios; Meško, Marek (eds.). War in Eleventh-Century Byzantium. Routledge. pp. 315–331.
- Vryonis, Speros (1971). The Decline of Medieval Hellenism in Asia Minor and the Process of Islamization from the Eleventh through the Fifteenth Century. University of California Press. ISBN 0-520-01597-5.
- Yakupoğlu, Cevdet (2022). Malazgirt Savaşı Öncesi Anadolu'ya Yapılan Türk Akınları (in Turkish). Boğaziçi Yayınları.
