= Latin Emperor =

Ruler of the Latin Empire (1204–61)

Emperor of Constantinople
- Imperial
- Attributed arms (historically used by Philip of Courtenay)

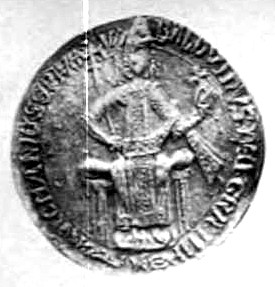
- Last in office Baldwin II; Early 1228 – 24 July 1261

Details
- First monarch: Baldwin I
- Last monarch: Baldwin II
- Formed: 16 April 1204
- Abolished: 25 July 1261
- Residence: Bucoleon Palace

The Latin emperor was the ruler of the Latin Empire, the historiographical convention for the Crusader realm, established in Constantinople after the Fourth Crusade (1204) and lasting until the city was reconquered by the Byzantine Greeks in 1261. Its name derives from its Catholic and Western European ("Latin") nature. The empire, whose official name was Imperium Romaniae (Latin: "Empire of Romania"), claimed the direct heritage of the Eastern Roman Empire, which had most of its lands taken and partitioned by the crusaders. This claim however was disputed by the Byzantine Greek successor states, the Empire of Nicaea, the Empire of Trebizond and the Despotate of Epirus. Out of these three, the Nicaeans succeeded in displacing the Latin emperors in 1261 and restored the Eastern Roman (Byzantine) Empire.

== Latin emperors of Constantinople, 1204–1261 ==
– Co-monarchs

Portrait	Name	Reign	Succession	Life details	Dynasty
bust	Baldwin I Baudouin	9 May 1204 – 14 April 1205 (11 months and 5 days)	Son of Baldwin V, Count of Hainaut and Margaret I, Countess of Flanders. Crowned emperor on 16 May 1204 in the Hagia Sophia	July 1172 – 1205/1206 (aged 33–34) Married to Marie of Champagne (2 daughters). Captured by the Second Bulgarian Empire in the Battle of Adrianople; died in captivity.	House of Flanders
bust	Henry; Henri	20 August 1206 – 11 June 1216 (9 years, 9 months and 22 days)	Brother of Baldwin I; ruled as regent until the news of his brother's death arrived to Constantinople	1178 – 11 June 1216 (aged 37–38) Married to Agnes of Montferrat and Maria of Bulgaria. Died of natural causes	House of Flanders
bust	Yolanda (♀); Yolande	1217 – September 1219 (2 years)	Sister of Baldwin I and Henry	1175 – September 1219 (aged 44) Made an alliance with Theodore I Lascaris of the Empire of Nicaea. Died of natural causes.	House of Flanders
bust	Peter; Pierre	1217 (Less than 1 year)	Brother-in-law of Baldwin I and Henry, son of Peter of Courtenay, also a cousin of King Philip II of France; crowned emperor in Rome by Pope Honorius III on 9 April 1217	Married Yolanda of Flanders (10 children). Captured by the despot of Epirus, Theodore Komnenos Doukas in 1217; died in captivity some time after.	House of Courtenay (Capet)
Regency of Conon de Béthune (1219) and Giovanni Colonna (1220–1221)
bust	Robert I	25 May 1221 – early 1228 (6 years)	Son of Emperor Peter and Yolanda, crowned emperor after an interregnum	Married Lady of Neuville. Died of natural causes in the Principality of Achaea while traveling back to Constantinople.	House of Courtenay (Capet)
bust	Baldwin II; Baudouin	early 1228 – 25 July 1261 (33 years) (24 years, 3 months and 28 days; without Regency)	Son of Emperor Peter and Yolanda. Still a child in 1221, he ruled under John's regency until 23 March 1237	late 1217 – October 1273 (aged 56) Married Marie of Brienne (1 son). Fled during the Reconquest of Constantinople.	House of Courtenay (Capet)
bust	John; Jean	9 April 1229 – 23 March 1237 (7 years, 11 months and 14 days)	Son of Erard II, Count of Brienne, and father-in-law of Baldwin II, crowned senior co-emperor and regent for Baldwin II	1170 – 23 March 1237 (aged 67) Married Stephanie of Armenia (1 son) and Berengaria of León (4 children). Only Latin emperor to die in Constantinople.	House of Brienne

== Latin emperors of Constantinople in exile, 1261–1383 ==
Latin Empire was disestablished in 1261, but Latin states in Greece, also known as Frankokratia, continued to recognize Latin emperors in exile as their overlords until 1383.

– Co-monarchs

Portrait	Name	Reign	Succession	Life details	Dynasty
bust	Baldwin II; Baudouin	25 July 1261 – October 1273 (12 years)	Last reigning Latin emperor; continued to claim the imperial title after the Reconquest of Constantinople	late 1217 – October 1273 (aged 56) Married Marie of Brienne (1 son). Fled during the Reconquest of Constantinople.	House of Courtenay (Capet)
bust	Philip I	1273 – 1283	Son of Baldwin II	1243 – 1283 Married Beatrice of Sicily.	House of Courtenay (Capet)
bust	Catherine I (♀)	1283 – 1307	Daughter of Philip I	1274 – 1307 Married Charles.	House of Courtenay (Capet)
bust	Charles	1301 – 1307	Husband of Catherine I	1270 – 1325 Son of King Philip III of France.	House of Valois (Capet)
bust	Catherine II (♀)	1307 – 1346	Daughter of Catherine I and Charles	1303 – 1346 Married Philip II.	House of Valois (Capet)
bust	Philip II	1313 – 1331	Husband of Catherine II	1278 – 1331 Son of King Charles II of Naples.	House of Anjou (Capet)
bust	Robert II	1346 – 1364	Son of Catherine II and Philip II	1319 – 1364 Married Marie de Bourbon.	House of Anjou (Capet)
bust	Philip III	1364 – 1373	Brother of Robert II	1329 – 1373 Married Maria of Calabria and Elizabeth of Slavonia.	House of Anjou (Capet)
bust	James	1373 – 1383	Nephew of Philip III	1354 – 1383 Married Agnes of Durazzo.	House of Baux

James of Baux willed his titular claims to Duke Louis I of Anjou, also claimant to the throne of Naples, but Louis and his descendants never used the title. However, there was further activity in regards to the imperial prerogatives of Latin Emperors. Louis' widow Marie of Blois claimed Achaea before selling the claim to Juan Fernández de Heredia. In 1494 during his invasion of Naples, a new Capetian pretender King Charles VIII of France planned a crusade to claim Constantinople. While his Neapolitan claim came from Louis' line, the claim on Constantinople came from Byzantine prince Andreas Palaiologos.

In 1396, King Ladislas of Naples sold the rights to the Principality of Achaea to Pedro de San Superano, the leader of the Navarrese Company, ending the principality's formal vassalage to the Angevins. Ultimately, Pedro did not have the funds to pay Ladislas, and through winning a family inheritance dispute that followed Peter's death in November 1402, Centurione II Zaccaria, a relative of Pedro (nephew of his wife) paid the owed sum, and became the new Prince of Achaea as per the original terms of the sale.

By acquiring the title, Centurione gained the automatic right to claim other Angevin interests in the region, including territories and feudal obligations associated with the Angevin Principality of Achaea. Centurione claimed the Latin imperial title "Despotus Romaniae" due to his possession of the principality, which was historically linked to the Angevin legacy and territorial claims, which included the Latin Empire. This title reflected his assertion of this new authority over regions that were part of the broader Angevin interest zone, which demonstrated his ambition to consolidate and expand his influence in the area.

Coat of arms of Carlo I Tocco as count of Cephalonia and ruler of Epirus

These feudal claims exercised over the existing latin vassals of the once Latin Empire included the right to demand loyalty and tribute from the respective lords, such as the Counts of Cephalonia and Zakynthos, based on previous feudal contracts. one of whom, Carlo I Tocco simply usurped Centurione's title of "Despotus Romaniae" and also began to use it along with the similar but separate title of "Despotus Romeorum," which in fact was later confirmed by the Byzantine Emperor Manuel II Palaiologos.

== See also ==
- List of Latin empresses
- List of Roman emperors
- List of Byzantine emperors

== Sources ==
- Zečević, Nada (2014) [1968]. The Tocco of the Greek Realm: Nobility, Power and Migration in Latin Greece (14th – 15th Centuries). Makart. ISBN 978-8687115118.
