= Louis of Brienne =

13th-century prince

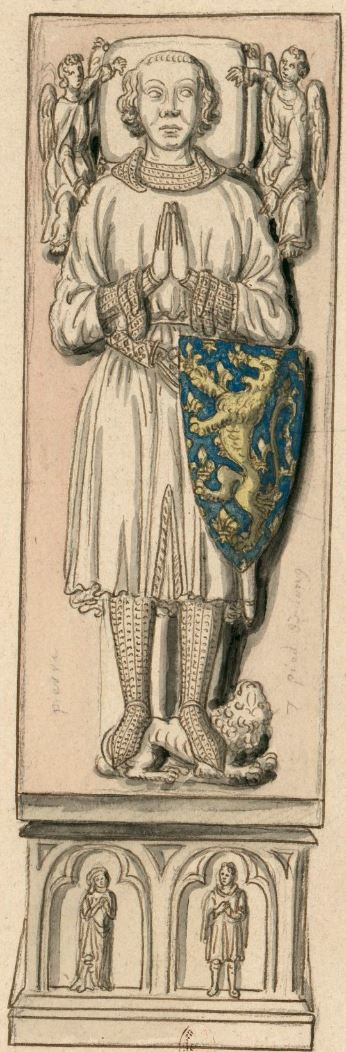
Gisant de Louis de Brienne (originally in the abbey of Etival-en-Charnie).

Louis of Brienne, also known as Louis of Acre (died in 1297), was viscount of Beaumont-sur-Sarthe in Maine, France.

== Early life ==
Louis was the second son of John of Brienne and his third wife, Berengaria of León. Louis and his two brothers, Alfonso and John, were commonly labelled as "of Acre" for the capital of the Kingdom of Jerusalem, although they were born years after their father had ruled the kingdom.

The barons of the Latin Empire of Constantinople offered to elect John of Brienne co-ruler of their minor emperor, Baldwin II, in 1229. John accepted the offer, and the terms of his election were included in a treaty in Perugia in April 1229. The treaty stipulated that John's three sons were entitled to rule Epirus and Macedonia if he could occupy the two regions from the Greek ruler, Theodore Komnenos Doukas. John and his family moved to Constantinople, where Baldwin II married John's daughter, Marie, and John was crowned co-emperor in July 1231.

Louis and his two brothers left Constantinople in the retinue of Baldwin II, who went on a tour in Europe to seek military assistance against the enemies of the Latin Empire in 1236. The French chronicler Guillaume de Nangis noted that the three brothers were still "very young". The chronicler also recorded that King Louis IX of France, who was the three brothers' cousin, received them "honourably and graciously". They grew up in the French royal court in Paris. They participated in the King's crusade against Egypt.

== Viscount of Beaumont ==
Louis married an heiress, Agnes of Beaumont. Through his marriage, Louis became the viscount of Beaumont-sur-Sarthe in Maine and a vassal of Louis IX's brother, Charles of Anjou. Being closely related to King Alfonso X of Castile, Louis and his brothers often visited the Castilian royal court, where they witnessed a series of royal charters between around 1250 and 1270.

== Marriage and children ==
Louis and his wife Agnes of Beaumont had:

- John, d. early 1300s, married (1)Jeanne of Guerche, (2)Matilda of Mechelen
- Louis, Bishop of Durham
- Henry, d. 1340, married Alice Comyn heiress of Buchan
- Margaret, Countess of Tripoli, d.1328, married Bohemond VII of Antioch
- Isabella, married John of Vescy
- Joan d.1323, married Guy VIII de Laval
- Mary, married Henri III d'Avaugour

== Sources ==
- Lock, Peter (1995). The Franks in the Aegean, 1204–1500. Longman. ISBN 0-582-05140-1.
- Perry, Guy (2018). The Briennes: The Rise and Fall of a Chempenois Dynasty in the Age of the Crusades, c. 950–1356. Cambridge University Press. ISBN 978-1-107-19690-2.
- Pollock, M.A. (2015). Scotland, England and France after the Loss of Normandy, 1204-1296: 'Auld Amitie'. The Boydell Press. ISBN 978-1-84383-992-7.
