= List of Latin empresses =

The following is a list of the Latin empresses consort of Constantinople.

== Latin Empresses consort of Constantinople ==
– Consort of co-emperor

Picture	Name	Father	Birth	Marriage	Became Empress	Coronation	Ceased to be Empress	Death	Spouse
	Marie of Champagne	Henry I, Count of Champagne (Blois)	1174	6 January 1186	9 May 1204	Never crowned	9 August 1204		Baldwin I
	Agnes of Montferrat	Boniface I, Marquess of Montferrat (Aleramici)	1187	4 February 1207		Never crowned	1207/1208		Henry
	Maria of Bulgaria	Kaloyan of Bulgaria (Asen)	-	1213		Never crowned	after 1216		Henry
	Lady of Neuville	Baldwin of Neuville in Artois	1175	1227		Never crowned	1228		Robert
	Berengaria of León	Alfonso IX of León (Anscarids)	1204	1224	1229 husband's accession	Never crowned	12 April 1237		John
	Marie of Brienne	John of Brienne (Brienne)	April 1225	1234		Never crowned	25 July 1261; Fall of Constantinople	after 5 May 1275	Baldwin II

== Latin Empresses consort of Constantinople in exile ==
- Marie of Brienne (1261–1273)
- Beatrice of Sicily (1273–1275)
- Marie de Bourbon (1347–1364)
- Maria of Calabria (1364–1366)
- Elizabeth of Slavonia (1370–1374)
- Agnes of Durazzo (1382—1383)

== See also ==
- Latin Emperor
- List of Roman and Byzantine empresses
- List of exiled and pretending Byzantine Empresses
- List of Queens of Jerusalem
- List of Queens of Cyprus
- Princess of Antioch
- Princess of Achaea
