= Emperor Henry =

Emperor Henry may refer to:

- Henry the Fowler (876–936), King of Germany but Holy Roman Emperors were numbered as if he had been Emperor
- Henry II, Holy Roman Emperor (972–1024)
- Henry III, Holy Roman Emperor (1017–1056)
- Henry IV, Holy Roman Emperor (1050–1106)
- Henry V, Holy Roman Emperor (1081–1125)
- Henry VI, Holy Roman Emperor (1165–1197)
- Henry VII, Holy Roman Emperor, (c. 1274–1313)
- Henry of Flanders (c. 1174–1216), Latin Emperor of Constantinople
- Puyi, the last Chinese Emperor
