= Lewis de Beaumont =

14th-century Bishop of Durham

- Bishop of Durham
- Appointed: 9 February 1317
- Term ended: 24 September 1333
- Predecessor: Richard Kellaw
- Successor: Richard de Bury

Orders
- Consecration: 26 March 1318

Personal details
- Born: before 1270 France
- Died: 24 September 1333
- Denomination: Catholic

Lewis de Beaumont (/ˈboʊmɒnt/ BOH-mont; died 1333) was Bishop of Durham during the last half of the First War of Scottish Independence.

== Ancestry ==
Lewis was born before 1270, son of Louis de Brienne and Agnès de Beaumont-au-Maine and grandson of John of Brienne, King of Jerusalem by his third wife, Berengaria of Leon, making him a second cousin of Edward II. His brother Henry de Beaumont was a central figure in the Scottish Wars who claimed the title of Earl of Buchan through his marriage to John Comyn's niece Alice and his sister was Isabella de Beaumont, wife of John de Vesci.

== Career and Life ==
In 1316 Lewis was certified as one of the Lords of the Nottinghamshire towns of North Leverton, Habilsthorp and Cotes.

Lewis was serving as Treasurer of Salisbury when he was nominated to be Bishop of Durham on 9 February 1317, thanks to the efforts of his countrywoman, Queen Isabella. He was confirmed at Westminster on 11 September 1317 and was consecrated in Durham on 26 March 1318. Despite being accused of being illiterate, Lewis was appointed in the hope of providing strong military leadership in his diocese which sat on the dangerous Scottish border, much in the same way as his brother, Henry, had done for the past twenty years. It was a questionable choice on the part of King Edward as Lewis was reported to be lame in both feet and his lack of mobility would seriously limit his ability to lead armed forces against the guerrilla tactics of Robert the Bruce.

In early 1317 Edward appealed to Pope John XXII to excommunicate Bruce and to end his attacks. The pope was keen to gather support for a crusade to recover the Holy Land and so sent two cardinals to persuade Bruce to accept a truce and to excommunicate him if he refused. In August 1317 the cardinals set off from England escorted by Lewis de Beaumont and his brother Henry. Disaster struck when they reached anarchic Northumberland where a local knight and brigand, Gilbert Middleton, and his large mob kidnapped and imprisoned them in Mitford Castle. The cardinals were soon released and met with Bruce but no truce was forthcoming. Lewis and his brother were held prisoner until December when Middleton himself was captured and hung, drawn and quartered in London following several months of violent rebellion.

In 1319 Lewis appointed Thomas Grey of Heaton as Sheriff of Norham and Islandshire and Constable of Norham Castle. Grey had served under Lewis' brother Henry and saved his life at the siege of Stirling Castle in 1304.

In 1322 Lewis was ordered to muster one thousand soldiers with the assistance of the castellan of Norham Castle, William Rydel. The king chose Andrew Harclay, the hero of the Battle of Boroughbridge, to lead the men and Lewis was sidelined. Later that year the king rebuked Lewis for turning down his offer to bolster the garrison of Norham Castle which had been the subject of repeated attacks and by the end of the year he was reduced to providing administrative support to Ralph Neville for future military operations.

The king was said to be disappointed with Lewis' lack of success in suppressing the Scots but his performance was repeated by other northern lords who grew tired of war and had little support from Edward whose concentration was focused on suppressing rebellions in England and Wales and would shortly turn back to France and the prelude to the Hundred Years War.

Lewis died on 24 September 1333.

== Citations ==
Catholic Church titles
| Preceded by Richard Kellaw | Bishop of Durham; 1317–1333 | Succeeded by Richard de Bury |
