= Beatrice of Sicily, Latin Empress =

Titular Latin Empress from 1273 to 1275

Beatrice of Sicily

Latin Empress consort of Constantinople
- Tenure: 15 October 1273 – 1275
- Born: c. 1252
- Died: 17 November/12 December 1275 (aged 23)
- Spouse: Philip I, Latin Emperor (m. 1273)
- Issue: Catherine I of Courtenay
- House: Anjou-Sicily
- Father: Charles I of Sicily
- Mother: Beatrice of Provence

Beatrice of Sicily (c. 1252 – 17 November/12 December 1275) was titular Latin Empress as the wife of Philip of Courtenay. Her parents were Charles I of Sicily and Beatrice of Provence.

Under the Treaty of Viterbo (27 May 1267), Baldwin II of Courtenay transferred much of the rights to the Latin Empire to Charles I. Charles was to be confirmed in possession of Corfu and some cities in Albania. He was also given suzerainty over the Principality of Achaea and sovereignty of the Aegean Islands, excepting those held by Venice and Lesbos, Chios, Samos, and Amorgos. The same treaty arranged the marriage of Philip of Courtenay, heir apparent to the Latin Empire, and Beatrice, second daughter of Charles. If the marriage was childless, Philip's rights would be inherited by Charles I. Beatrice was approximately fifteen years old at the time of her betrothal.

On 15 October 1273, Beatrice and Philip were married in Foggia. The bride was twenty-one years old and the groom thirty. Her father-in-law died days later. Philip was proclaimed emperor with Beatrice as empress. The marriage was harmonious and produced a daughter, Catherine I of Courtenay, born on 25 November 1274.

Beatrice died in late 1275 after a short illness.

Titles in pretence
Preceded by Marie of Brienne	— TITULAR — Latin Empress consort of Constantinople; 1273–1275; Reason for succession failure: Conquest by Empire of Nicaea in 1261	Succeeded by Marie of Bourbon
