= Catherine of Courtenay =

Titular Latin Empress from 1283 to 1307

Catherine
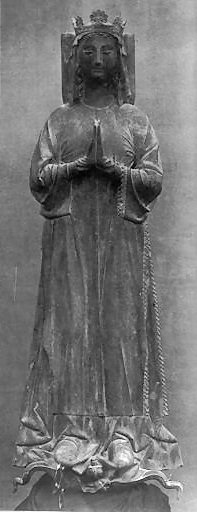

Latin Empress of Constantinople
- Reign: 15 December 1283 – 11 October 1307
- Predecessor: Philip I
- Successor: Catherine II
- Co-ruler: Charles (1301–1307)
- Born: 25 November 1274
- Died: 11 October 1307 (aged 32); Paris, France
- Burial: Maubuisson Abbey, Paris
- Spouse: Charles, Count of Valois
- Issue: John, Count of Chartres; Catherine, Princess of Taranto; Joanna, Countess of Beaumont; Isabella of Valois
- House: Courtenay
- Father: Philip I, Latin Emperor
- Mother: Beatrice of Sicily

Catherine of Courtenay (25 November 1274 – 11 October 1307), also known as Catherine I, was the claimant to the defunct Latin Empire from 1283 to 1307, although she lived in exile and only held authority over crusader states in Greece. In 1301, she became the second wife of Count Charles of Valois, by whom she had one son and three daughters; the eldest of these, Catherine of Valois-Courtenay, succeeded her as titular empress.

== Life ==
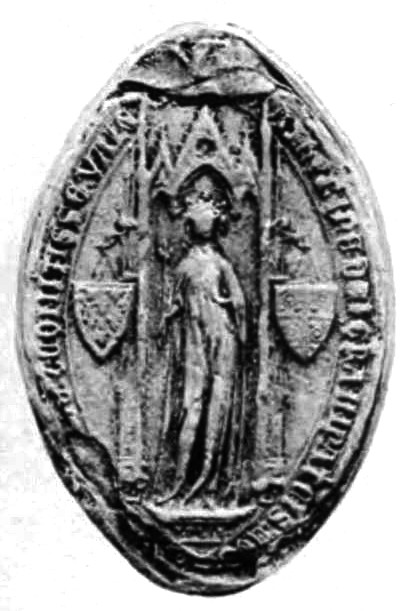
Seal of Catherine of Courtenay

She was born on 25 November 1274, the only daughter and heir of the titular Latin emperor of Constantinople, Philip of Courtenay, by Beatrice of Sicily.

Upon her father's death on 15 December 1283, Catherine inherited his claims to the Latin throne of Constantinople and was recognized as empress by the Latin states in Greece, despite the city having been re-taken by the Empire of Nicaea in 1261.

Catherine was betrothed three times before her marriage:

—Firstly, in 1288, with Michael IX Palaiologos, co-Byzantine Emperor; this union was proposed by the intended groom's father Emperor Andronikos II Palaiologos in the hope of reducing the threat of restoring the power of the Latins in the Byzantine Empire and reconciling with both the Holy See and the European monarchs, who frightened Constantinople with a new Crusade; however, after several years of fruitless negotiations and the decisive objection from the French king, the purposed union was abandoned by 1295, when Michael IX was already married.

—Secondly, in June 1295, with Infante Frederick of Aragon, son of King Peter III. As a condition of this betrothal, the intended groom promised to renounce his rights to the Kingdom of Sicily and give help to reconquer the Latin Empire of Constantinople, but this proposal was opposed by the French king and the betrothal was terminated.

—Thirdly, on 24 January 1299 to Infante James of Majorca, son of King James II. Since the couple were too closely related, the condition for the marriage was dispensation from Pope Boniface VIII, which was never granted. Instead, James decided to remove himself from the line of succession of the Kingdom of Majorca and take the habit.

Finally, on 28 February 1301 at the Priory of St. Cloud near Paris, Catherine became in the second wife of Count Charles of Valois, son of King Philip III of France. On 23 April 1301, Charles became titular Latin Emperor with Catherine until her death in Paris on 11 October 1307 at the age of 32. She was buried at the abbey of Maubuisson the following day, 12 October. Jacques de Molay, Grand Master of the Knights Templar served as one of her pallbearers.

== Issue ==
By Charles of Valois, Catherine had four children:

- John, Count of Chartres (1302–1308).
- Catherine, titular Empress of Constantinople (before 15 April 1303 – October 1346). She married Philip I of Anjou, Prince of Taranto and had issue.
- Joan of Valois (1304 – 9 July 1363), married Count Robert III of Artois
- Isabella of Valois (1305 – 11 November 1349), Abbess of Fontevrault.

== See also ==
- Jacques de Molay was arrested by King Philip IV the day after attending her funeral on 12 October 1307 in Paris.

== Sources ==
- Lock, Peter (2013). The Franks in the Aegean: 1204-1500. Routledge.
- Michel, André (1907). "Nouvelles Archéologiques et Correspondance". Revue Archéologique: Quatrième Série (in French). 10 (Juillet-Décembre). Presses Universitaires de France: 445–457.
- Warner, Kathryn (2019). Philippa of Hainault: Mother of the English Nation. Amberley.

Catherine of Courtenay House of Courtenay Cadet branch of the Capetian dynasty Born: 25 November 1274 Died: 11 October 1307
Titles in pretence
Preceded by Philip of Courtenay	— TITULAR — Latin Empress of Constantinople; 1283–1307 with Charles, Count of Valois (1301–1307)	Succeeded by Catherine of Valois
