= Isabella de Beaumont =

French noblewoman and ally of Isabella of France

- Born: circa 1260
- Died: 1334
- Noble family: de Beaumont de Vesci
- Spouse: John, Baron de Vesci
- Father: Sir Louis de Brienne
- Mother: Agnés de Beaumont, Vicomte of Beaumont
- Occupation: Lady-in-waiting to Eleanor of Castile and Isabella of France.

Isabella de Beaumont (died 1334), was an English noblewoman and courtier. She was the lady-in-waiting and ally to Isabella of France during the reign of Edward II of England.

== Reign of Edward I and marriage ==
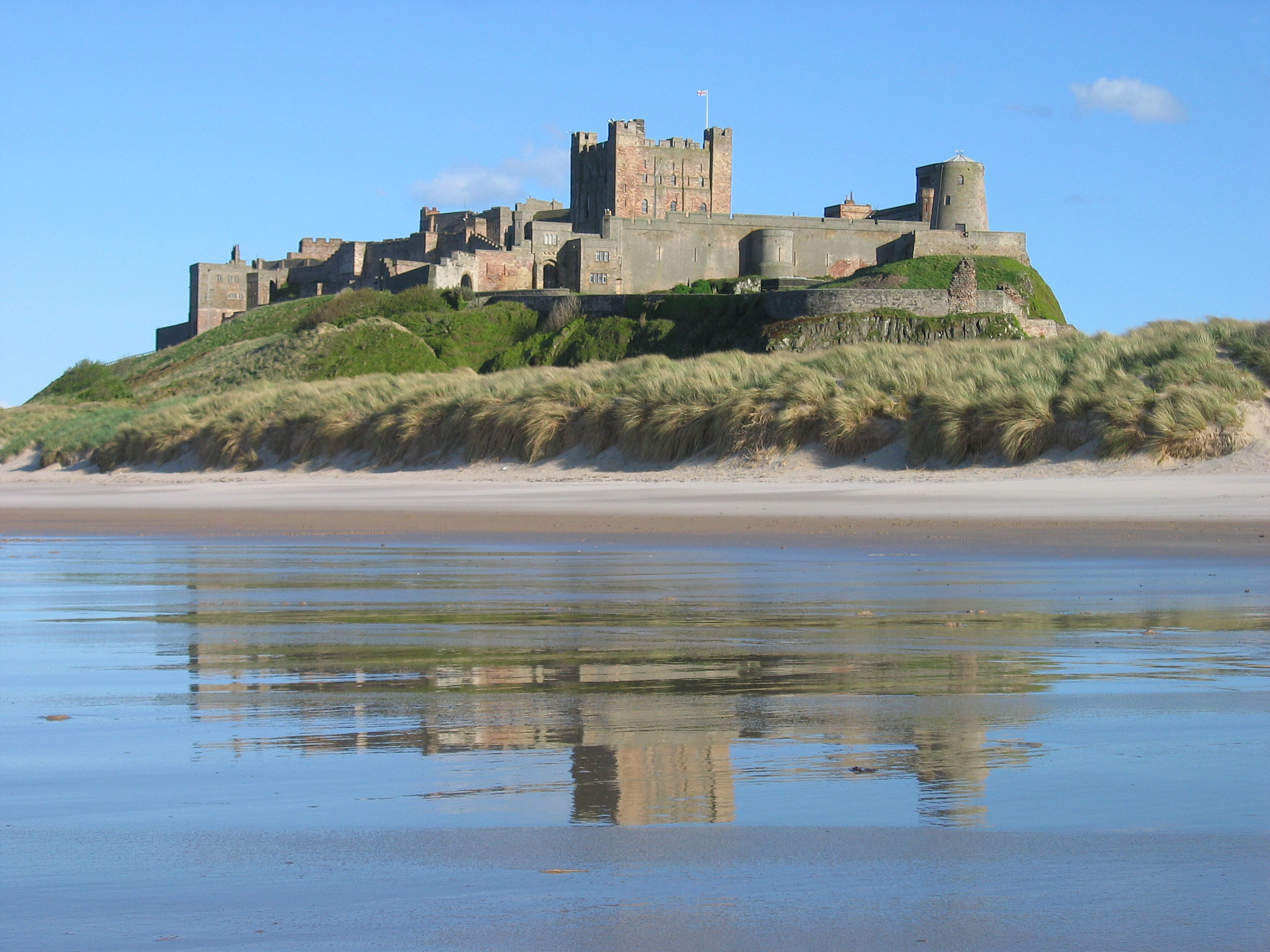
Isabella was the royal governor of both Scarborough and Bamburgh Castle (shown here).

Isabella de Beaumont was the daughter of Sir Louis de Brienne and Agnés de Beaumont, Vicomtesse of Beaumont. The de Beaumonts were a powerful noble family with French origins. Isabella herself was the granddaughter of John of Brienne, King of Jerusalem, by his third wife, Berengaria of Leon, the daughter of Berengaria of Castile. Through her Castilian great-grandmother, Isabella was a cousin of Edward I's wife, Eleanor of Castile. Isabella was therefore a particularly well-connected member of a noble family that stretched across Europe. Isabella arrived in England in either 1278 or 1279, and married John de Vesci, a prominent noble, in either 1279 or 1280, with Edward I's blessing. The marriage was an advantageous one for John de Vesci, but also strengthened Isabella's English credentials at the Plantagenet court, where John – a close associate of both Henry III and Edward I – was a central figure.

Isabella continued to enjoy royal favour; for her wedding, she was given valuable lands by the king to hold in her own right, for example. When Isabella and her husband travelled to Gascony in France in 1288, Edward arranged for them to have apartments next to his own royal lodgings and had them specially decorated for Christmas. Isabella was one of the closest friends of the Queen of England, right to Eleanor's death in 1290. Isabella de Beaumont was also made the governor of two royal castles, Scarborough Castle in Yorkshire and Bamburgh Castle in Northumberland, her main power base, subject to her remaining single and unmarried. Being granted governorships of castles close to conflict areas was unheard of for a woman of the period, and Edward probably did so on the basis of Isabella's personal loyalty to him. Nonetheless, the actual appointment to Bamburgh was not done entirely regularly – the Great Seal was not applied to the appointment – and this would cause Isabella later problems.

John de Vesci died in 1289, and after Isabella took her brother in law, William de Vesci to court over various of John's lands, she was left a major landowner in England. Isabella's lands stretched from Scotland to Kent, and after William de Vesci's disastrous fall from royal favour in Ireland, Isabella effectively became the most senior member of the Beaumont/Vescy family alliance. In 1300, Isabella's brother, Henry de Beaumont, arrived in England, where Isabella convinced the king to grant him lands formerly owned by her late husband. Isabella was also responsible for organising the marriage of her brother Henry to the niece of John Comyn, Earl of Buchan, in turn ensuring that Henry inherited the earldom and many Scottish properties. In combination, the de Beaumont family also held numerous properties in the disputed kingdom of Scotland, which would come to influence later events.

== Early years under Edward II ==
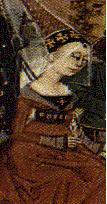
Isabella of France, Queen to Edward II of England; Isabella de Beaumont was a close friend to her, but would ultimately turn against the Queen in 1330.

Isabella, together with her brother, Henry de Beaumont, in due course became important figures at the court of Edward II of England after the death of Edward in 1307. Her other immediate family included Louis de Beaumont. Isabella de Beaumont became a lady-in-waiting and close friend to the young Isabella of France when she came from France to marry Edward in 1308. The two Isabellas frequently corresponded when apart, which was quite frequent as, like other members of Queen Isabella's court, Isabella de Beaumont had feudal responsibilities elsewhere in the kingdom.

Isabella de Beaumont played a role in many key political events. Politics under the early reign of Edward II saw huge tensions between different factions within England. Edward, at this stage with the support of his young wife Queen Isabella, had formed a close attachment to his favourite Piers Gaveston. Opposing Edward was a Lancastrian faction of powerful barons, as well as groupings of Marcher lords in Wales and further factions in Kent. The de Beaumonts had allied themselves to Queen Isabella, who – in the early part of Edward's reign – was perceived by the Lancastrians as an ally of Gaveston. Further more, Thomas of Lancaster himself perceived Isabella and Henry as unwelcome newcomers in the north of England – the de Vesci had a long history there, longer than Lancaster's own, but Isabella was a foreigner, come to wealth and power by royal favour. Lancaster also disliked the close friendship that had existed between Isabella and his father-in-law, Henry de Lacy. As a result, when the Lancastrians pushed through the Ordinances of 1311, which sought to circumscribe royal power, Isabella and her brother were banished from court. Isabella was accused of giving "evil council" and illegally securing writs for her clients, and returned to her home in Yorkshire for a short period.

Baronial attempts were made to remove Isabella from her governorship of Bamburgh castle; Edward II wrote to her instructing her to delay as long as possible, and Isabella hung on, eventually agreeing to surrender the castle in exchange for lands in Lincolnshire and Dorset. Even then, she handed the castle over to one of Edward's clerks, not a baron. Isabella de Beaumont soon engineered her return to court in 1313, overturning the ordinances, and in the coming years, Isabella and Henry increasingly relied upon Queen Isabella for protection and support, in return supporting her politically. The Queen sent Isabella many gifts, including brie cheese from France and wild boar meat. Isabella accompanied the King and Queen on diplomatic visits to France. Through the Queen, Isabella was instrumental in getting another of her brothers, the extravagant and illiterate Louis de Beaumont, another opponent of the Lancastrians, appointed Bishop of Durham in 1317. Louis assured the king that he would form a "stone wall" against any Scottish invasion from the north.

== Opposition to the Despensers ==
After 1322 and the Despenser War, Edward II had temporarily quashed the Lancastrian factions; his new favourite, Hugh Despenser the Younger had replaced the late Piers Gaveston. Edward and Queen Isabella became increasingly divided, however, with matters coming to a head after Edward's failed invasion of Scotland, which led to Queen Isabella being effectively abandoned by Edward and the Despensers, and almost captured by the Scots who pursued her across Yorkshire. Queen Isabella blamed Edward and the Despensers; the king blamed Louis de Beaumont, whose "stone wall" was clearly less robust than hoped, and Isabella de Beaumont – as Louis's sister and a close friend of Queen Isabella – lost the favour they had previously enjoyed with Edward. Indeed, both Queen Isabella and the de Beaumonts rapidly found themselves on the wrong side of the Despensers' increasingly despotic regime. Isabella has been described as a "silent partner" in Queen Isabella's increasing hostility toward the king.

By 1326 Queen Isabella had grown desperate and left for Paris, ostensibly to conduct diplomacy over the disputed province of Gascony, but in reality in an attempt to raise a rebellion against Edward and the Despensers. Isabella de Beaumont and Henry had meanwhile turned openly against Edward; royal officials were being attacked by de Vesci forces across Yorkshire. Isabella invaded England shortly afterwards, accompanied by her lover, Roger de Mortimer, deposing Edward – the de Vesci family now looked forward to enjoying the support of the court once more. One of the first acts of the new regime was to appoint the late earl of Atholl's young son to the custodianship of Isabella, who then married him to one her nieces, thereby giving her and Henry control of two out of the five Scottish earldoms.

== Isabella and the fall of Queen Isabella ==
One of the major political dilemmas of Queen Isabella's new regime was the problem of the Scottish wars – England could not easily afford to continue them, but any peace with the Scots could have major implications for English landowners with estates in the north. Queen Isabella and Mortimer opted for peace, with the result that families such the Beaumonts lost considerable property. This marked the end of Isabella's friendship with Queen Isabella, and Isabella and Henry broke with the new court and increasingly became part of the opposition movement.

In 1330, Edmund of Kent attempted to lead an uprising against Queen Isabella, with the aim of restoring Edward II, whom many believed still to be alive at this time. Isabella had a key part in this conspiracy, using her confessor to send messages between Edmund and William Melton, the archbishop of York. Queen Isabella and Mortimer uncovered the plot and executed Edmund, but Isabella herself escaped arrest. Edward III overthrew Mortimer later in the year, and Isabella de Beaumont therefore found herself back in royal favour for the last few years of her life, receiving additional lands in North Wales. Isabella died without issue in 1334, being buried at the Black Friars abbey at Scarborough; her brother Henry inherited her lands.

== Bibliography ==
- Doherty, Paul. (2003) Isabella and the Strange Death of Edward II. London: Robinson.
- Mitchell, Linda Elizabeth. (2003) Portraits of medieval women: family, marriage, and politics in England, 1255–1350. New York: Palgrave Macmillan.
- Parsons, John Carmi. (1998) Eleanor of Castile: Queen and Society in Thirteenth-Century England. New York: St Martin's Press.
- Philipot, John. (1776) Villare cantianum: or, Kent surveyed and illustrated. King's Lynn: Whittingham and associates.
- Prestwich, Michael. (1971) Isabella de Vesci and the Custody of Bamburgh Castle. BIHR 44 (1971), 148–52.
- Stopes, Charlotte Carmichael. (2009) British Freewomen. Charleston: BiblioLife. ISBN 1-110-64852-9.
- Smith, Brendan, ed. (1999). Britain and Ireland, 900–1300: Insular Responses to Medieval European Change. Cambridge University Press.
  - Stringer, Keith J. "Nobility and identity in medieval Britain and Ireland: the de Vescy family, c.1120–1314". In Smith (1999).
- Tout, Thomas Frederick. (2010) France and England Their Relations in the Middle Ages and Now. Manchester University Press.
- Warner, Kathryn (2016). Isabella of France: The Rebel Queen. Amberley Publishing.
