= Emperor Baldwin =

Emperor Baldwin may refer to:

- Baldwin I, Latin Emperor
- Baldwin II, Latin Emperor
