= Marie de Bourbon, Princess of Achaea =

Princess of Achaea (r. 1364–1387), titular Latin Empress (1347–1364)

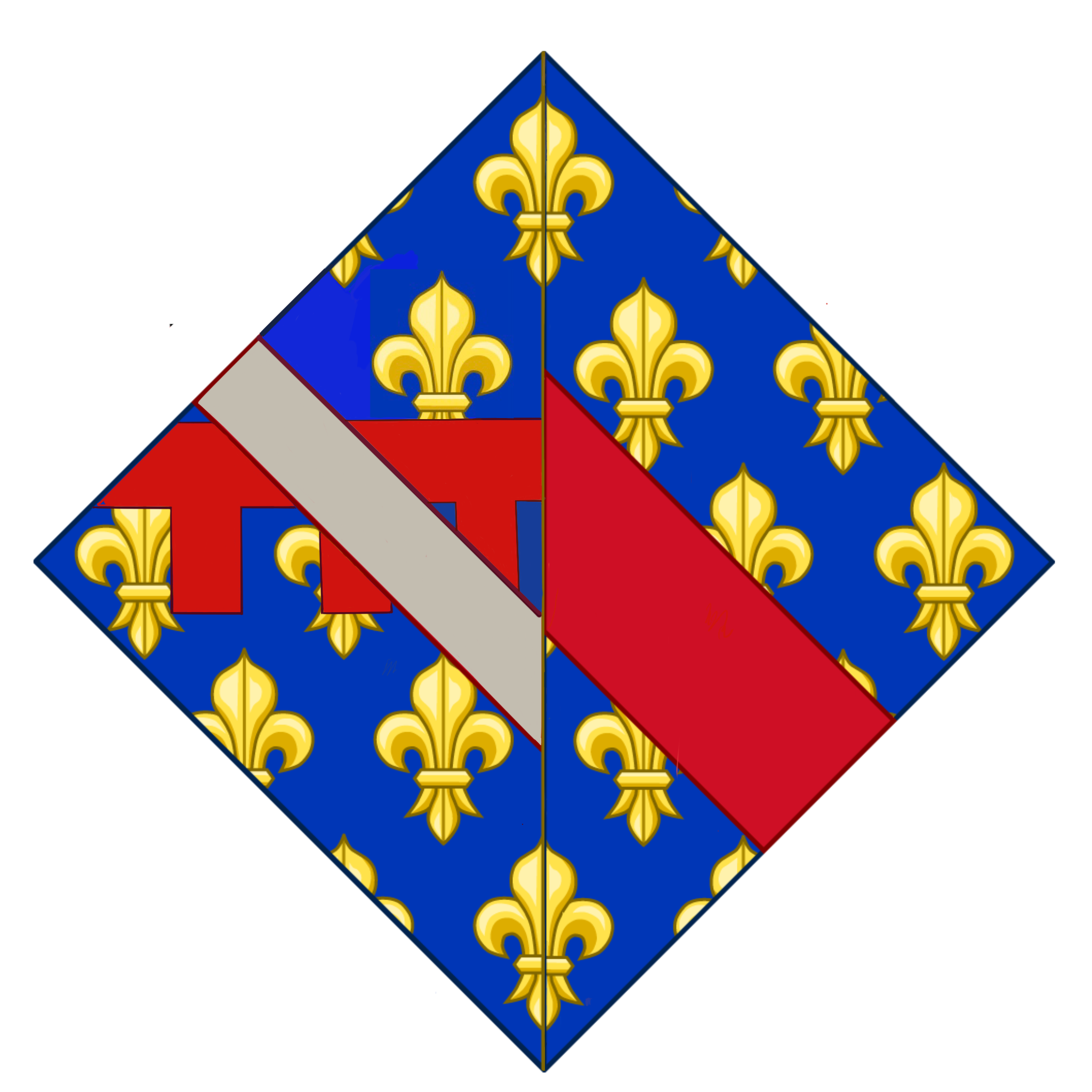
Coat of arms of "Maria van Bourbon"

Marie of Bourbon (c. 1315–1387) was the sovereign baroness of Vostitsa from 1359 to 1370. She was princess consort of Achaea and titular Latin Empress consort by marriage to Robert of Taranto, Prince of Achaea and titular Latin Emperor of Constantinople. Upon the death of Robert in 1364, she became princess regnant of Achaea until her death.

== Life ==
She was a daughter of Louis I, Duke of Bourbon and Mary of Avesnes. She was a younger sister of Peter I, Duke of Bourbon and an older sister of James I, Count of La Marche.

=== First marriage ===
On 29 November 1328, Marie was betrothed to Guy of Lusignan, titular Prince of Galilee at the Château de Bourbon. He was the son of Hugh IV of Cyprus and his first wife Marie d'Ibelin. On 20 December 1328, Marie and Guy were married by proxy. The Chronicle of Amadi records her arrival at Famagusta, Kingdom of Cyprus in June 1329. On 31 January 1330, Marie and Guy were married in person at the Santa Sophia in Nicosia.

Hugh of Lusignan, their only known son, was born in about 1335. Her husband was appointed constable of Cyprus between 1336 and 1338. He died in 1343 from unstated causes. The correspondence of Pope Clement VI includes a letter of condolences for the death of Guy, dated to 24 September 1343. The actual death likely occurred in the months preceding the letter. The widowed Marie was not allowed to leave Cyprus until 1346 by orders of her father-in-law.

=== Second marriage ===
In 1346, Marie and her son left Cyprus in exile. By 1347, they had settled in Naples, Kingdom of Naples, at the court of Queen Joan I of Naples. On 9 September 1347, Marie married her second husband Robert of Taranto, a first cousin, once removed to Joan. Her new husband was the claimant to the throne of the Latin Empire while holding both the Principality of Taranto and the Principality of Achaea. He had also been appointed a captain general in the military of Naples.

They were soon separated for a number of years. Joan was a main suspect for orchestrating the assassination of her first husband Andrew, Duke of Calabria. On 3 November 1347, Louis I of Hungary, older brother of Andrew, invaded the Italian Peninsula in a retaliation campaign. While Joan and her second husband Louis of Taranto, younger brother of Robert, managed to flee Naples, Robert did not. He was arrested at Aversa. In 1348, the Black Death reached the Italian Peninsula, forcing Louis I and the majority of his army to retreat back to the Kingdom of Hungary in hope of escaping the spreading epidemic. Robert was among the prisoners following Louis I to Hungary. He spent about four years in captivity and only returned to his wife in Naples during March, 1352.

In 1353, Robert initiated a campaign in the Ionian Sea, attempting to re-establish his authority over a number of the Ionian Islands. By 1354, he had managed to secure control of Corfu, Kefalonia and Zante. He added to his titles the newly coined Duke of Leucas before returning to Naples.

=== Reign ===
Marie benefited by the brief campaign as Robert transferred to her lands in Corfu, Kefalonia and the fiefdom of Kalamata (part of the Principality of Achaea). She would proceed to purchase the rights to the Baronies of Vostitsa and Nivelet by 1359.

On 10 September 1364, Robert of Taranto died. His marriage with Marie had been childless and his legal heir was his younger brother Philip II of Taranto. However Marie contested the succession. By 1364, Marie owned sixteen castles in Achaia and thus controlled a considerable section of the Principality. She kept the title of Princess of Achaia and put forth her son Hugh as her own candidate for the throne of the principality. Hugh was still unable to claim the throne of Cyprus but his uncle Peter I named him Prince of Galilee in 1365. In 1366, Hugh invaded the Peloponnese at the head of 12,000 mercenaries, initiating a war of succession for Achaia.

On 17 January 1369, Peter I of Cyprus was assassinated by three of his own knights, in his bed at the Palace of La Cava, Nicosia. He was succeeded by his son Peter II of Cyprus. Hugh saw another opportunity to claim the throne of Cyprus and left the Peloponnese to travel to Nicosia, effectively abandoning his campaign. Marie continued the civil war until 1370.

Unable to secure victory, Marie sold her rights to Philip II, Prince of Taranto for 6,000 gold pieces. Her fiefdoms of Vostitsa and Nivelets were sold to Nerio I Acciaioli, later Duke of Athens. She only retained her fiefdom of Kalamata.

Hugh of Lusignan married Marie de Morphou, a daughter of Jean de Morphou, Count of Roucha, but seems to have died childless. He predeceased his mother c. 1385. The last will and testament of Marie named her nephew Louis II, Duke of Bourbon as her sole heir.

== Sources ==
- Edbury, Peter W. (1991). The Kingdom of Cyprus and the Crusades, 1191–1374. Cambridge: Cambridge University Press. ISBN 0-521-26876-1.
- Sturdza, Mihail-Dimitri (1983). Dictionnaire historique et Généalogique des grandes familles de Grèce, d'Albanie et de Constantinople (in French). Mihail-Dimitri Sturdza.
- Topping, Peter (1975). "The Morea, 1311–1364". In Hazard, Harry W. (ed.). A History of the Crusades, Vol. III: The Fourteenth and Fifteenth Centuries. Madison: University of Wisconsin Press. ISBN 978-0299066703.

Titles in pretence
Preceded by Beatrice of Sicily	— TITULAR — Latin Empress consort of Constantinople; 1347–1364; Reason for succession failure: Conquest by Empire of Nicaea in 1261	Succeeded by Maria of Calabria
