= Richard Kellaw =

14th-century Bishop of Durham

- Bishop of Durham
- Elected: 31 March 1311
- Term ended: 9 October 1316
- Predecessor: Antony Beck
- Successor: Lewis de Beaumont

Orders
- Consecration: 30 May 1311

Personal details
- Died: 9 October 1316
- Buried: chapter house in Durham Cathedral
- Denomination: Catholic

Richard Kellaw or Richard de Kellawe (died 1316) was an English Benedictine monk and Bishop of Durham. He was elected on 31 March 1311, and was consecrated on 30 May 1311. He died on 9 October 1316. In the 19th century, a grave identified as his was excavated in the Durham Cathedral Chapter House.

== Citations ==
Catholic Church titles
Preceded by Antony Bek	Bishop of Durham; 1311–1316	Succeeded by Lewis de Beaumont
