= Philip of Courtenay =

Titular Latin Emperor from 1273 to 1283

Philip I
- Emperor and Autocrat of the Romans
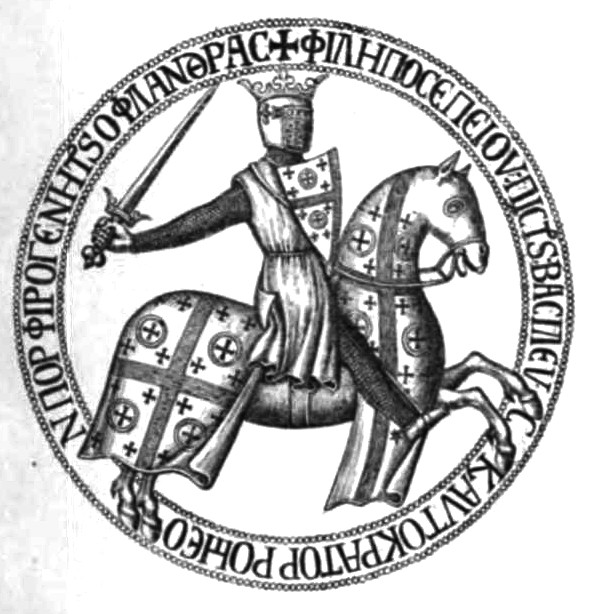
- Seal of Philip of Courteney

Latin Emperor of Constantinople
- Reign: October 1273 – 12 December 1283
- Predecessor: Baldwin II
- Successor: Catherine I
- Born: 1243; Constantinople
- Died: 15 December 1283 (aged 40); Viterbo
- Spouse: Beatrice of Sicily (m. 1273; died 1275)
- Issue: Catherine I, Latin Empress
- House: Courtenay
- Father: Baldwin II, Latin Emperor
- Mother: Marie of Brienne

Philip I, also Philip of Courtenay (1243 – 15 December 1283), held the title of Latin Emperor of Constantinople from 1273–1283, although Constantinople had been reinstated since 1261 to the Byzantine Empire; he lived in exile and only held authority over Crusader States in Greece. He was born in Constantinople, the son of Baldwin II of Constantinople and Marie of Brienne.

In his youth, his father was forced to mortgage him to Venetian merchants to raise money for the support of his empire, which was lost to the Empire of Nicaea in 1261.

By the Treaty of Viterbo in 1267, his father agreed to marry him to Beatrice of Sicily, daughter of Charles I of Sicily and Beatrice of Provence.

The marriage was performed in October 1273 at Foggia; shortly thereafter, Baldwin died, and Philip inherited his claims on Constantinople. Although Philip was recognized as emperor by the Latin possessions in Greece, much of the actual authority devolved on the Angevin kings of Naples and Sicily. Philip died in Viterbo in 1283.

Philip and Beatrice had a daughter:

- Catherine (25 November 1274 – 11 October 1307, Paris), married Charles, Count of Valois in 1301

== Sources ==
- Lock, Peter (2013). The Franks in the Aegean: 1204-1500. Routledge. ISBN 978-0-582-05139-3.
- Nicol, Donald M. (1988). Byzantium and Venice: A Study in Diplomatic and Cultural Relations. Cambridge: Cambridge University Press. ISBN 0-521-34157-4.

== See also ==
- Wolff, Robert L. (1954). "Mortgage and Redemption of an Emperor's Son: Castile and the Latin Empire of Constantinople". Speculum. 29 (1): 45–84. doi:10.2307/2853868. JSTOR 2853868. S2CID 164166886.

Philip of Courtenay House of Courtenay Born: 1243 Died: 1283
Titles in pretence
Preceded by Baldwin II of Constantinople	— TITULAR — Latin Emperor of Constantinople; 1273–1283	Succeeded by Catherine of Courtenay
