= Marie of Brienne =

Latin Empress from 1234 to 1261

- Empress and Autocratess of the Romans
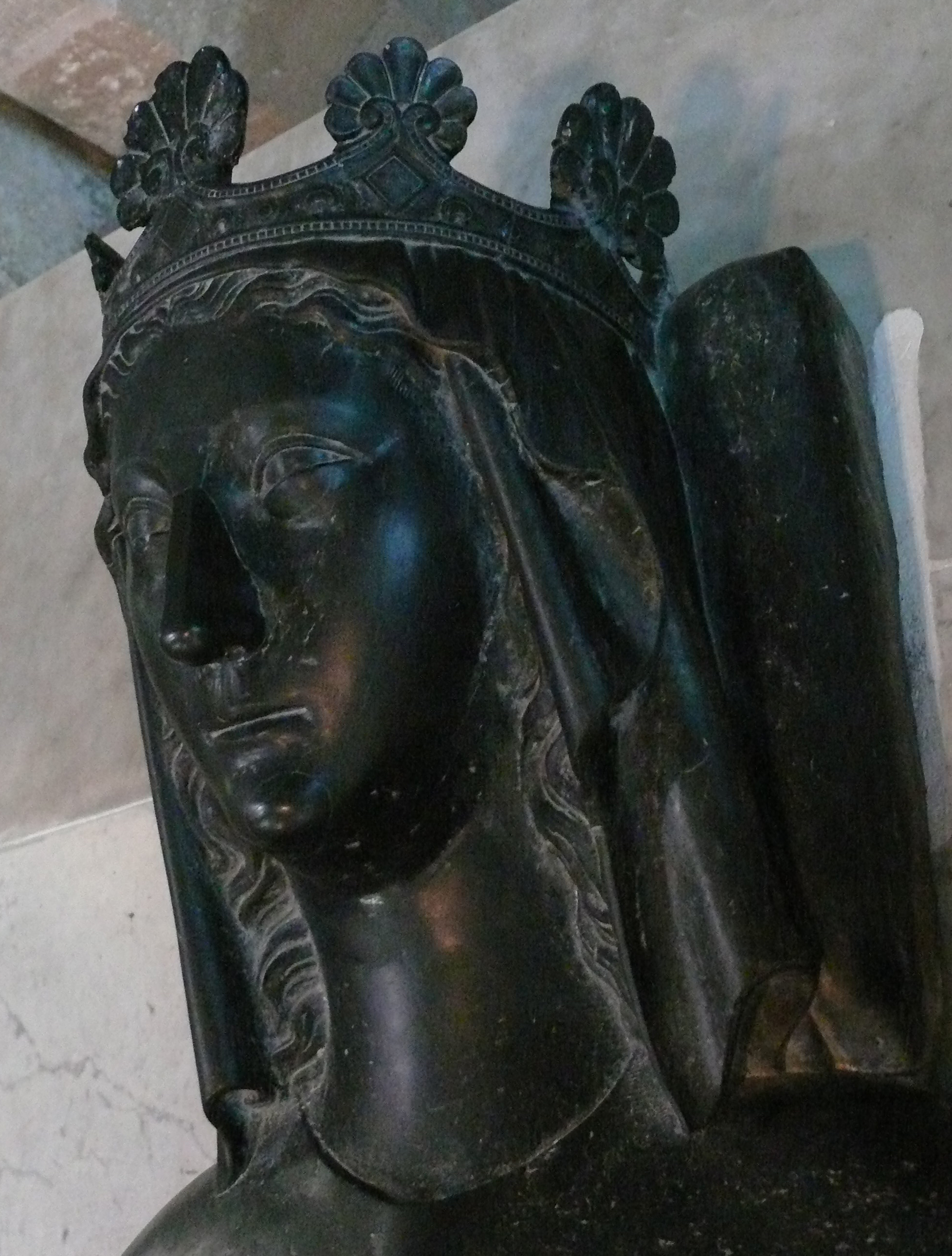

Latin Empress consort
- Tenure: 1234–1261 (in exile 1261–1273)
- Born: c. 1224; Capua
- Died: after 5 May 1275 (aged 51) in Italy
- Burial: Assisi
- Spouse: Baldwin II, Latin Emperor (m. 1234; died 1273)
- Issue: Philip of Courtenay
- House: Brienne
- Father: John, Latin Emperor
- Mother: Berengaria of León

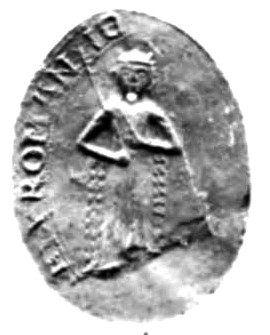
Seal of Marie of Brienne.

Marie of Brienne (c. 1224–1275) was Latin Empress as the wife of Baldwin II of Courtenay. She served as regent during the absence of Baldwin II twice: in 1237–1239, and in 1243–1257.

== Family ==
Marie of Brienne was a daughter of John of Brienne and his third wife Berenguela of Leon. Marie was a younger, paternal half-sister of Isabella II of Jerusalem. She was also a sister of Alphonso of Brienne.

== Marriage ==
On 19 April 1229, Marie was betrothed to Baldwin II, junior co-ruler of her father as Emperor of the Latin Empire. The marriage was intended to establish a dynastic alliance between the two co-rulers. Marie was at most five years old at the time of her betrothal, her parents having married in 1224.

Their marriage took place in 1234. The bride was about ten years old, the groom seventeen. Their marriage was recorded in the chronicle of Alberic of Trois-Fontaines. By her marriage, Marie became the junior co-empress of the Latin Empire, the senior one being her mother.

== Empress ==
In 1235-36, Constantinople was besieged by the combined forces of Ivan Asen II of Bulgaria and John III Doukas Vatatzes of the Empire of Nicaea. The city was defended by only its small garrison of knights, the fleet of the Republic of Venice and a minor force sent by Geoffrey II of Villehardouin, Prince of Achaea to reinforce the defense. The city was only spared conquest because of a quarrel between the two allies over who would receive command of the city in the event of a success. John V. A. Fine has suggested that Ivan Asen realised the greater threat posed to the Second Bulgarian Empire by the expansion of Nicaea rather than the weakened Latin Empire.

In any case, John of Brienne had taken command of the defense of Constantinople. Baldwin II undertook another mission, heading to Western Europe in attempt of raising the funds and recruiting the armed forces needed to secure the survival of their Empire. John died on 27 March 1237, Berenguela following him on 12 April. The twelve-year-old Marie was left in nominal command of the city, as the sole representative of the imperial family present in it. Baldwin would not return until July 1239.

Baldwin returned at the head of a Crusading force from Western Europe, variously estimated to include as few as thirty thousand men or as many as sixty thousand. This force was joined by a contingent of Cumans, combining to besiege Tzurulum, a Nicaean stronghold in Thrace. The city fell in 1240 but this seems to have been the only success of this force. They are not mentioned afterwards. John V. A. Fine presumes that most of them returned to their homes in Western Europe, only a few of them joining the existing garrison of Constantinople. For the moment, the Latin Empire had ensured its continued survival. Marie was approximately fifteen-year-old at the time her husband returned to his capital.

On 15 April 1240 (Easter), Baldwin II was crowned emperor in Hagia Sophia. Their only known son, Philip I, Latin Emperor, was born in 1243. However this period of relative peace for the couple was not to last. Baldwin left for the Kingdom in France by the end of 1243, intending to seek support from Louis IX of France. In his absence Marie became regent of the Empire, with Philip of Toucy as her initial co-regent. Philip was a son of Narjot of Toucy and his first wife. His mother was a daughter of Theodore Branas and Agnes of France. Baldwin was absent for several years, first staying in France and then joining Louis IX of France in the Seventh Crusade. He returned by 8 October 1248, the date of a charter that empowered her to mortgage his western lands in order to pay the huge debt of 24,000 hyperpers.

Within a month of Baldwin's arrival, Marie left Constantinople for Western Europe. Marie's great-aunt, Blanche of Castile, had arranged for her travel and had given Baldwin 20,000 livres in exchange for two promises: not to sell his properties at Namur, and to send Marie to visit her within a month after his return to Constantinople. Baldwin prepared four armed ships to take Marie and her escort abroad. Marie arrived in Cyprus while Louis IX of France and the Crusaders were stationed there, only to have a strong winds blow her ship free of its anchor, taking it and all its cargo to Acre. This left Marie with only the clothes on her back and a cloak. The Crusaders there took care of her. Soon after leaving Cyprus, Marie arrived in Negropont on 30 January 1249, from where she reached France in May. According to the Chronique de Flandres, Marie stayed with her great-aunt Blanche until Blanche died in 1252.

After this, the Chronique de Flandres reports that Marie went to live in her husband's estates at Namur. For the next years Marie contested unsuccessfully with Henry V of Luxembourg for control of those properties, which were the source of income for both Emperor and Empress, until her cession of these lands and castles 17 June 1258 to Margaret II, Countess of Flanders. Despite this, the Castle of Namur refused to surrender to Henry, the vassal of Margaret of Flanders, until St. Vincent's Day (21 January 1259). After this, she went to the court of Castile where she successfully raised the money to ransom her son Philip, who was held hostage by bankers in Venice and who was released at some date between June 1258 and 1 May 1261.

== Reconquest of Constantinople ==
The imperial couple would not hold their capital for long. In July 1261, Alexios Strategopoulos, a general of Nicaea, was sent with a small advance force of 800 soldiers, most of them Cumans, to keep a watch on the Bulgarians and spy out the defences of the Latins. When the Byzantine force reached the village of Selymbria, they learned from independent local farmers (thelematarioi) that the entire Latin garrison, and the Venetian fleet, were absent conducting a raid against the Nicaean island of Daphnousia. Although initially hesitant, due to both the small size of his force, which might be fatal if the Latin army returned, and because he would exceed his orders, Strategopoulos eventually decided not to lose such a golden opportunity to retake the city.

On the night of 25 July 1261, Alexios and his men approached the city walls and hid at a monastery near the Pege Gate. Alexios sent a detachment of his men, who, led by some of the thelematarioi, made their way to the city through a secret passage. They attacked the walls from the inside, surprised the guards and opened the gate, allowing the Byzantine force entry into the city. The Latins were taken completely by surprise, and after some fighting, the Byzantine force gained control of the land walls. Fearing the revenge the Byzantines would exact upon them, the Latin inhabitants, from Emperor Baldwin II downwards, hurriedly rushed to the harbour, hoping to escape by ship. Thanks to the timely arrival of the returning Venetian fleet, they were evacuated, but the city was lost for good. Marie presumably managed to flee with her husband.

== Exile ==
A Venetian ship took Baldwin and Marie to Euboea, from there proceeding to Athens, Apulia and then back to France. In the following years they survived by selling their de facto and de jure rights to various secondary titles and lands.

On 26 March 1263, their rights to Namur were bought by Guy of Dampierre. Namur was at the time actually held by Henry V of Luxembourg but Guy would successfully conquer it by 1268. In January 1266, their rights to the Kingdom of Thessalonica were bought by Hugh IV, Duke of Burgundy for 13,000 livres tournois. At the time the city was under the control of Michael VIII Palaiologos, the Nicaean emperor who had moved his capital to Constantinople, while the title was also claimed by William VII, Marquess of Montferrat.

On 27 May 1267, the Treaty of Viterbo, transferred much of the rights to the Latin Empire fiefs from Baldwin II to Charles I of Sicily. Charles was to be confirmed in possession of Corfu and some cities in Albania. He was also given suzerainty over the Principality of Achaea and sovereignty of the Aegean Islands, excepting those held by Venice and Lesbos, Chios, Samos, and Amorgos.

Baldwin and Marie spend the rest of their lives in the court of Charles. In October 1273, Baldwin died in Naples. Marie survived him by about two years. She was buried in Assisi.

Royal titles
Preceded by Berenguela of Leon	Latin Empress consort 1234–1261 with Berenguela of Leon (1229–1237)	Fall of Constantinople
Titles in pretence
Loss of title Fall of Constantinople	— TITULAR — Latin Empress consort 1261–1273; Reason for succession failure: Conquest by Empire of Nicaea	Succeeded by Beatrice of Sicily
