= Agnes of Montferrat =

Latin Empress (1187–1207/1208)

Latin Empress consort of Constantinople
- Tenure: 1207 – c. 1208
- Born: c. 1187
- Died: 1207/1208
- Spouse: Henry of Flanders
- House: Aleramici
- Father: Boniface I, King of Thessalonica
- Mother: Helena del Bosco

Agnes of Montferrat (c. 1187 – 1207/1208) was the first empress consort of Henry of Flanders, Latin Emperor of Constantinople.

== Family ==
She was a daughter of Boniface I, Marquess of Montferrat, founder of the Kingdom of Thessalonica, and his first wife Helena del Bosco. Her maternal grandfather was Anselmo, Marquess of Bosco.

She was a sister of William VI, Marquess of Montferrat and Beatrice of Montferrat, wife of Henry II del Carretto, Marquess of Savona. She was also an older, paternal half-sister of Demetrius of Montferrat, King of Thessalonica.

== Empress consort ==
According to Geoffrey of Villehardouin, Agnes was residing in Lombardy until her father summoned her to Thessaloniki in 1206. Boniface proceeded to send Otto de la Roche, megaskyr or grand seignior of Athens, as his envoy to Henry, proposing a marriage between her and the emperor. Henry agreed to the offer.

Boniface sent Agnes to Abydos, Hellespont, Mysia through a galley. His messengers then reached Henry with information to her location. Geoffrey Villehardouin himself and Miles the Brabant of Provins were assigned to escort her. Villehardouin describes Agnes as "very good and fair". Agnes was escorted to Constantinople with no mentioned incident. On 4 February 1207, Agness married Henry of Flanders. According to Villehardouin, the marriage took place in Hagia Sophia, Constantinople on the Sunday following Candlemas. The wedding feast took place in Boukoleon Palace. According to the Dictionnaire historique et Généalogique des grandes familles de Grèce, d'Albanie et de Constantinople (1983) by Mihail-Dimitri Sturdza, the marriage was part of a new alliance between Boniface and Henry against Kaloyan of Bulgaria.

Villehardouin records that in about September, 1207, Henry informed his father-in-law of Agnes being pregnant. A source or rejoicing for both allies. The chronicle ends with the death of Boniface on 4 September 1207 and thus does not report of the conclusion of the pregnancy. As there seems to be no further mention of Agnes, the empress is considered to have died in childbirth, probably along with her child.

In 1208, there is mention by Henri de Valenciennes of a daughter of Henry marrying Alexander, a nephew of Peter IV of Bulgaria, Ivan Asen I of Bulgaria and Kaloyan of Bulgaria. However, as a daughter of Agnes, said daughter would be a newborn, an unlikely age for marriage. She is therefore considered to have been an illegitimate child of Henry by a mistress.

Royal titles
| Preceded by Marie of Champagne | Latin Empress consort of Constantinople; 1207 – c. 1208 | Succeeded by Maria of Bulgaria |
