= Lady of Neuville =

Latin Empress (died 1228)

Latin Empress consort
- Tenure: 25 March 1221 – 1228 (as Empress of Robert I)
- Coronation: 1227
- Predecessor: Maria of Bulgaria, Latin Empress
- Successor: Berengaria of León (as Empress of John of Brienne)
- Died: Possibly County of Artois
- Spouse: Robert of Courtenay
- House: House of Courtenay

Lady of Neuville (French: Madame de Neuville-en-Artois) (died 1228) was the empress consort of Robert of Courtenay, Latin Emperor of Constantinople. Her first name is unknown, though a number of genealogies have assigned her the name Eudoxie (Eudoxia). The name is possibly a confusion with Eudokia Laskarina, a Byzantine princess that was previously betrothed to Robert, whose name is Latinized to Eudoxia.

== Family ==
According to William of Tyre Continuator, a 13th-century continuation of the chronicle of William of Tyre, the Lady was a daughter of Baldwin of Neuville in Artois. Her mother is mentioned but not named. Her further ancestry is unknown, though presumed to be French.

== Empress ==
Robert of Courtenay had been crowned emperor on 25 March 1221. According to George Acropolites he was betrothed to Eudokia Laskarina in 1221. She was a daughter of Theodore I Laskaris and Anna Komnene Angelina. Eudokia was also a younger sister to both Irene Lascarina, wife of John III Doukas Vatatzes and Maria Laskarina, wife of Béla IV of Hungary. However the marriage was opposed by Patriarch Manuel I of Constantinople on grounds of consanguinity. Though not actually closely related by blood, Eudokia was a stepdaughter of Marie de Courtenay who was third wife of Theodore I and sister to Robert. Eudokia was already present in Constantinople. She had been taken there by her paternal uncles Alexios and Isaac Laskaris who had left the Empire of Nicaea following the death of Theodore I. Both uncles joined the military service of the Latin Empire. According to Acropolites, they co-led a Latin force into Bithynia during 1224. They were defeated by their kinsman John III Doukas Vatatzes, captured and blinded.

For some reason the marriage contract with Eudokia was never completed. According to Alberic of Trois-Fontaines, Eudokia was betrothed (or married) to Frederick II, Duke of Austria in 1226. The marriage contract was broken or the marriage annulled by 1229, when Frederick married Agnes of Merania, a daughter of Otto I, Duke of Merania and Beatrice II, Countess of Burgundy. Eudokia went on to marry Anseau de Cayeux, Chamberlain of the Latin Empire.

Robert remained unmarried until about 1227. According to William of Tyre Continuator, Robert and the Lady of Neuville were secretly married, despite her already being the fiancée of a Burgundian gentleman. Both the new wife of the Emperor and her mother were placed in a manor house owned by Robert. The unnamed Burgundian gentleman somehow found out and reportedly organized a conspiracy against Robert and his new wife. The knights of Constantinople partaking in the conspiracy proceeded to capture the Empress and her mother. The lips and nostrils of both women were cut off and then thrown to sea.

Robert left Constantinople following the attack, seeking the assistance of Pope Gregory IX in re-establishing his authority. On his return journey from Rome, Robert visited the court of Geoffrey I of Villehardouin of the Principality of Achaea. There he fell sick and died. He never returned to Constantinople. Their marriage was childless, whether the Lady survived her mutilation is uncertain. However she does not resurface in sources.

== Sources ==
- Angold, Michael (2011). "The Latin Empire of Constantinople, 1204–1261: Marriage Strategies". Identities and Allegiances in the Eastern Mediterranean after 1204. Farnham: Ashgate Publishing Limited. pp. 47–68. ISBN 9781409410980.

Royal titles
Preceded by Maria of Bulgaria, Latin Empress	Latin Empress consort of Constantinople c. 1227–1228	Succeeded by Berenguela of León
