= John II of Brienne =

French nobleman (c.1227–1296)

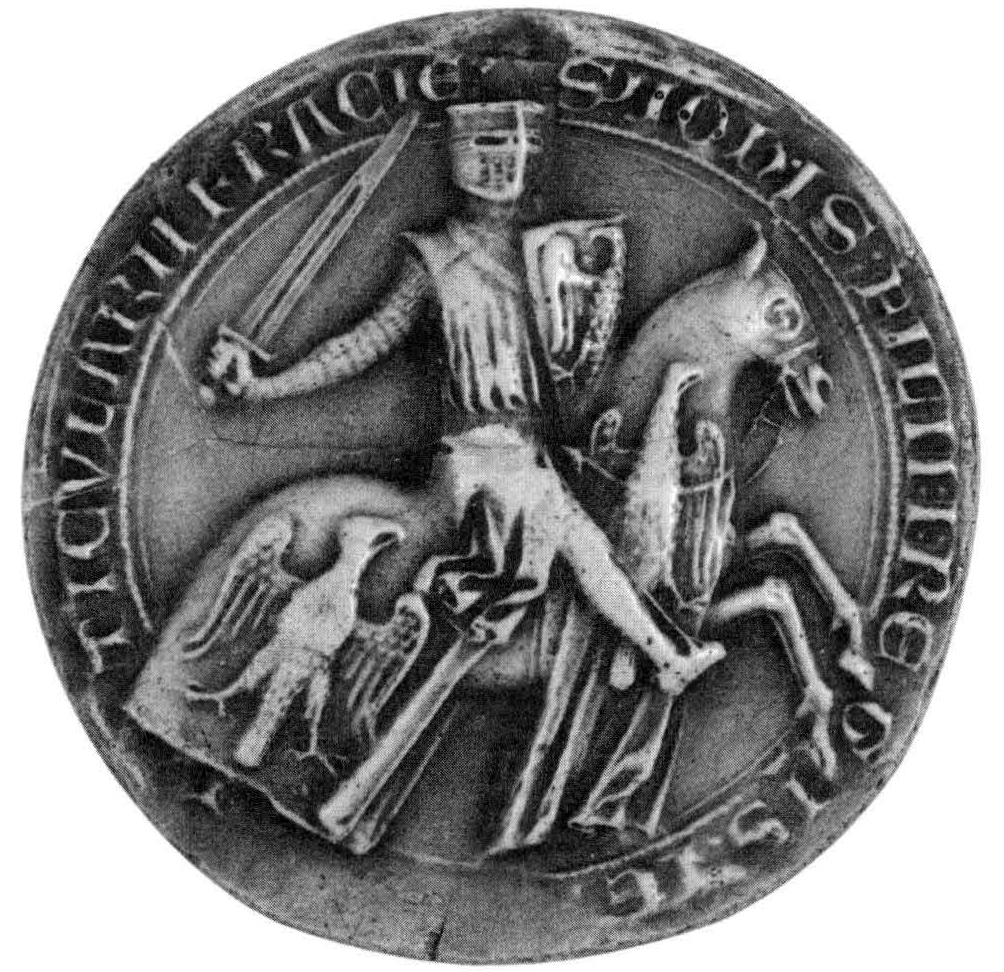
- Seal
- Born: c. 1227
- Died: c.1296
- Buried: Maubuisson Abbey, France
- Noble family: House of Brienne
- Spouses: Jeanne, Dame de Chateaudun (m.1251;d. 1252); Marie de Coucy (m.1257; d. 1285)
- Issue: Blanche de Brienne, Baroness Tingry
- Father: John, Latin Emperor
- Mother: Berengaria of León

Sir John of Brienne (Note: Also Jean de Brienne or Jean de Acre.) (died c. 1296), was a French nobleman who served as Grand Butler of France in 1258.

== Biography ==
Jean was the youngest son of John of Brienne, Latin Emperor of Constantinople and Berengaria of León.

He held the office of Grand Butler of France in 1258, and later the Ambassador to Castile in 1275.

He carried the functions of Governor of the County of Champagne for Edmund Crouchback between 1275 and 1284.

He died in circa 1296 and was buried at the Abbey of Maubuisson, France.

== Marriage and issue ==
John married firstly Jeanne, daughter of Geoffrey VI, Viscount of Châteaudun and Clemence de Roches. They had:

- Blanche

He married secondly Marie, the widow of Alexander II of Scotland, the daughter of Enguerrand III, Lord of Coucy and Marie de Montmirel. They had no issue and later separated when she returned to Scotland to aid her family interests.
