= Reconquest of Constantinople =

1261 battle between the Latin and Nicaean Empires

- Part of Struggle for Constantinople
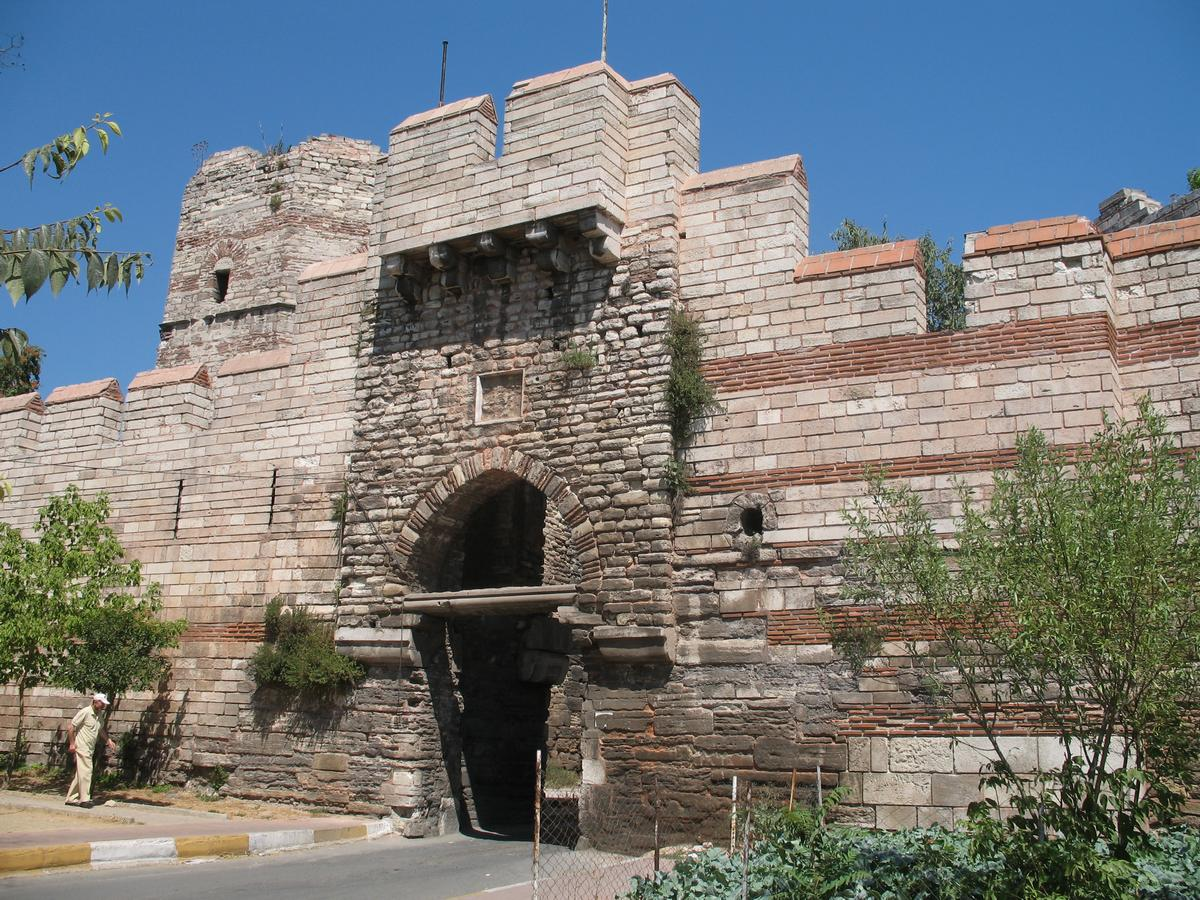
- The Gate of the Spring (Pege) or Selymbria Gate, through which Strategopoulos and his men entered Constantinople on 25 July 1261
Date	25 July 1261 AD
Location	Constantinople
Result	Nicaean victory
Territorial changes	Re-establishment of the Byzantine Empire; End of the Latin Empire; The Latin emperor Baldwin II of Constantinople fled the city by ship

Belligerents
Empire of Nicaea	Latin Empire; Republic of Venice

Commanders and leaders
Alexios Strategopoulos	Baldwin II

Strength
800 soldiers	Small garrison Unknown number of Venetians

Casualties and losses
Minimal	Unknown

Constantinople was recaptured in 1261 from the Latin Empire by Nicaean forces led by the general Alexios Strategopoulos. The reconquest of the city led to the re-establishment of the Byzantine Empire under the Palaiologos dynasty after an interval of 57 years, during which Constantinople had been the capital of the Latin Empire, a crusader state installed by Latin forces of the Fourth Crusade following the sack of Constantinople in 1204.

The recapture of Constantinople ended more than a half century of occupation by the Latin Empire over the Byzantine capital. The reconstituted Byzantine Empire under the Palaiologoi would go on to hold the city successfully for nearly two more centuries, until its fall to the Ottoman Turks in 1453.

== Background ==
Following his victory at the Battle of Pelagonia in 1259 AD against an anti-Nicaean coalition, Nicaean emperor Michael VIII Palaiologos was left free to pursue the reconquest of Constantinople, a primary goal of the Byzantine rump states in both Epirus and Asia Minor since 1204. By 1259 the remnants of the Latin Empire were reduced to the city of Constantinople and its immediate environs, cut off from both the remaining Latin states of Greece and from the Nicaeans' Greek rival, the Despotate of Epirus. As early as 1260, Michael Palaiologos attacked Constantinople, as one of the Latin knights taken prisoner in Pelagonia, whose house was within the city walls, had promised to open a gate for the emperor's troops. He failed to do so, and Palaiologos launched an unsuccessful assault on Galata instead. To strengthen his position, Michael concluded an alliance with Genoa in March 1261. In July 1261, as the one-year truce agreed upon after the failed Nicaean siege of 1260 was nearing its end, the general Alexios Strategopoulos was sent with a small advance force of 800 soldiers (most of them Cumans) to keep a watch on the Bulgarians and to reconnoiter the Latin defenses of the city.

== Capture of Constantinople ==
When the Nicaean force reached the village of Selymbria, some 30 miles (48 km) west of Constantinople, they learned from some independent local farmers (thelematarioi) that the entire Latin garrison, as well as the Latin-allied Venetian fleet, was absent conducting a raid against the Nicaean island of Daphnousia in the Black Sea. Strategopoulos initially hesitated to take advantage of the situation, fearing that his small force might be destroyed if the Latin army returned too soon, and because he would exceed the provisions of the emperor's orders, but eventually decided he could not squander such a remarkable opportunity to seize the city without a prolonged siege.

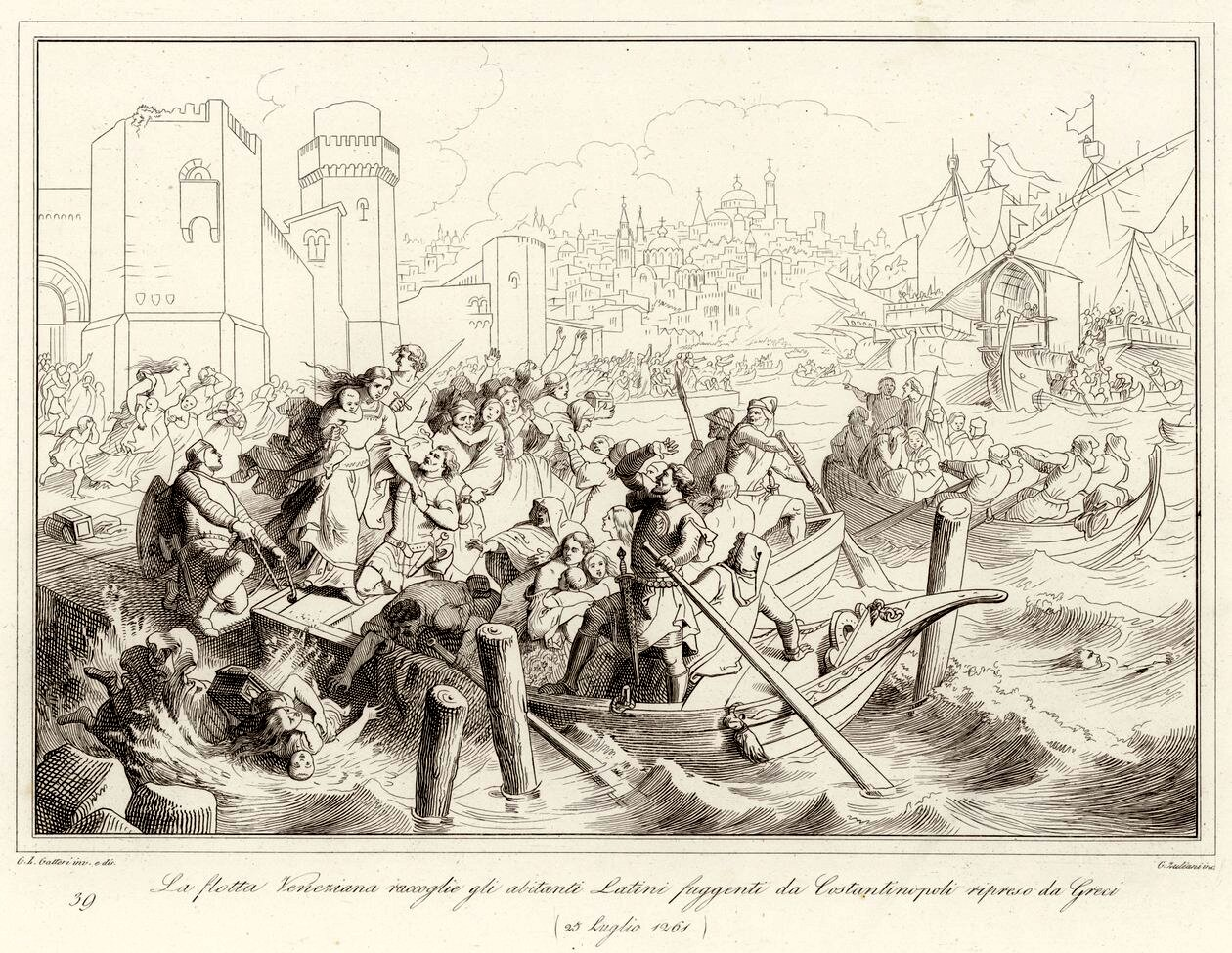
Fanciful depiction of the Venetian fleet rescuing the Latin inhabitants, by Giuseppe Lorenzo Gatteri

On the night of 24/25 July 1261, Strategopoulos and his men approached the city walls and hid at a monastery near the Gate of the Spring. Strategopoulos sent a detachment of his men, led by some of the thelematarioi, to make their way to the city through a secret passage. This afforded them the opportunity to attack the walls from the inside, which surprised the guards and opened the gate, giving the Nicaean forces an entry into the city. The Latins were taken completely unaware, and after a short struggle, the Nicaeans gained control of the Theodosian land walls. As news of this spread across the city, the Latin inhabitants, from Emperor Baldwin II downwards, hurriedly rushed to the harbours of the Golden Horn, hoping to escape by ship. At the same time, Strategopoulos' men set fire to the Venetian buildings and warehouses along the coast to prevent them from landing there. Due to the timely arrival of the returning Venetian fleet, many of the Latins managed to evacuate to the still Latin-held parts of Greece, marking the end of the Latin occupation with the city's restoration to the Byzantines.

== Aftermath ==
The recapture of Constantinople signalled the restoration of the Byzantine Empire, and on 15 August, the day of the Dormition of the Theotokos, Emperor Michael VIII entered the city in triumph and was crowned at the Hagia Sophia. The rights of the legitimate emperor, John IV Laskaris, for whom Palaiologos had been ostensibly ruling as a guardian, were brushed aside, and the boy subsequently was blinded and imprisoned.

== Sources ==
- Bartusis, Mark C. (1997). The Late Byzantine Army: Arms and Society, 1204–1453. University of Pennsylvania Press. ISBN 0-8122-1620-2.
- Geanakoplos, Deno John (1959). Emperor Michael Palaeologus and the West, 1258–1282: A Study in Byzantine-Latin Relations. Cambridge, Massachusetts: Harvard University Press.
- Nicol, Donald M. (1993) [1972]. The Last Centuries of Byzantium, 1261–1453 (Second ed.). Cambridge: Cambridge University Press. ISBN 978-0-521-43991-6.
- Wolff, Robert Lee (1969) [1962]. "The Latin Empire of Constantinople, 1204–1261". In Setton, Kenneth M.; Wolff, Robert Lee; Hazard, Harry W. (eds.). A History of the Crusades, Volume II: The Later Crusades, 1189–1311. Vol. 2 (Second ed.). Madison, Milwaukee, and London: University of Wisconsin Press. pp. 186–233. ISBN 0-299-04844-6.
