= Henry of Flanders =

Latin Emperor from 1206 to 1216

- Emperor and Autocrat of the Romans
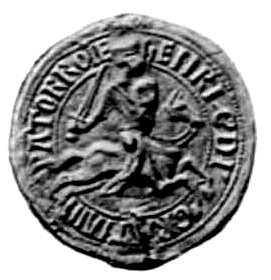
- Seal of Henry of Flanders

Latin Emperor of Constantinople Claimant Byzantine Emperor
- Reign: 1206–1216
- Coronation: 20 August 1206
- Predecessor: Baldwin I
- Successor: Peter and Yolanda

Regent of the Latin Empire
- Regency: 1205–1206
- Born: c. 1178; Valenciennes
- Died: 11 June 1216; Thessaloniki
- Spouses: Agnes of Montferrat; Maria of Bulgaria
- House: House of Flanders
- Father: Baldwin V, Count of Hainaut
- Mother: Margaret I, Countess of Flanders

Henry of Flanders (1178? – 11 June 1216) was Latin emperor of Constantinople from 1206 until his death in 1216. He was one of the leaders of the Fourth Crusade in which the Byzantine Empire was conquered and Latin Empire formed.

== Life ==
Henry was born in Valenciennes, France around 1178. He was the son of Count Baldwin V of Hainaut and Countess Margaret I of Flanders. Henry first married (in 1204) Agnes of Montferrat, daughter of Boniface of Montferrat. Henry's only child by his first wife Agnes died in childbirth with his mother.

Some contemporary historians say that Henry made peace with Bulgarians after the death of Kaloyan, and a marriage was arranged in 1213 between Henry and Maria, daughter of Kaloyan and stepdaughter of Tsar Boril of Bulgaria.

Henry had a daughter with an unnamed mistress. This daughter, whose name is not recorded, probably (Margaret-Isabel) later married Alexius Slav, who established his own state in the Rhodope mountains. He was later given the title of despot.

== Leadership in the Fourth Crusade ==
Having joined the Fourth Crusade in about 1201, he distinguished himself at the siege of Constantinople of 1203 and elsewhere. During the July 1203 siege, Henry was one of eight division generals, the others including Boniface of Montferrat (the crusade leader), Doge Enrico Dandolo (leader of the Venetians), Louis of Blois (one of the first nobles to take the cross), and Henry's own brother, Baldwin IX of Flanders, who controlled the largest division. During the 1204 siege, Henry led a chevauchée expedition to gain supplies and raided a castle in Philia, near the Black Sea with, according to Robert de Clari, about 30 knights and an unspecified number of mounted sergeants. An ambush was laid for him by Emperor Alexius V Ducas, but Henry and his force routed the Greeks soundly, captured a revered icon supposedly containing relics of Christ, and returned to the crusader camp. He soon became prominent among the princes of the new Latin Empire.

== In the Latin Empire ==
When his elder brother, Emperor Baldwin, was captured at the Battle of Adrianople in April 1205 by the Bulgarians, Henry was chosen regent of the empire, succeeding to the throne when the news of Baldwin's death arrived. He was crowned on 20 August 1206.

Upon Henry's ascension as Latin emperor, the Lombard nobles of the Kingdom of Thessalonica refused to give him allegiance. A two-year war ensued and after defeating the Templar-supported Lombards, Henry confiscated the Templar castles of Ravennika and Zetouni (Lamia).

Henry was a wise ruler, whose reign was largely passed in successful struggles with Tsar Kaloyan of Bulgaria and with his rival Emperor Theodore I Lascaris of Nicaea. He later fought against Boril of Bulgaria (1207–1218) and managed to defeat him in the Battle of Philippopolis. Henry campaigned against the Nicean Empire, expanding a small holding in Asia Minor (at Pegai) with campaigns in 1207 (at Nicomedia) and in 1211–1212 (with the Battle of the Rhyndacus), where he captured important Nicean possessions at Nymphaion. Though Theodore I Laskaris could not oppose this later campaign, it appears that Henry decided it best to focus on his European problems, for he sought a truce with Theodore I in 1214, and amicably divided Latin from Nicean possessions to the favour of Nicea.

Domestically, Henry appears to have a different character than many of the other Crusader nobles as seen in his even-handed and pragmatic treatment of the Greeks. George Akropolites, the contemporary 13th-century Greek historian, notes that Henry "though a Frank by birth, behaved graciously to the Romans who were natives of the city of Constantine, and ranked many of them among his magnates, others among his soldiers, while the common populace he treated as his own people." Indeed, when a Papal legate (Pelagio Galvani, Cardinal-Bishop of Albano) arrived in Constantinople in 1213 and began to imprison Orthodox clergy and to close churches on the orders of Pope Innocent III, Henry countermanded the orders on the request of the city's Greek clergy.

Henry appears to have been brave but not cruel, and tolerant but not weak, possessing "the superior courage to oppose, in a superstitious age, the pride and avarice of the clergy." The emperor died, poisoned, it is said, by Oberto II of Biandrate, ex-regent of Thessaloniki, on 11 June 1216. Gardner suggests this happened at the instigation of his wife, Maria of Bulgaria. On his death his brother-in-law Peter was crowned emperor in Rome but never arrived in Constantinople. In the years 1217 to 1219, therefore, the Latin Empire was ruled by Yolanda, Henry's sister and Peter's widow, alone. The last two Latin emperors were Peter and Yolanda's sons, Robert I and Baldwin II.

== Sources ==
=== Primary ===
- Akropolites, George (2007) [c. 1270]. The History. Translated by Macrides, Ruth. Oxford University Press.
- This article incorporates text from a publication now in the public domain: Chisholm, Hugh, ed. (1911). "Henry of Romania". Encyclopædia Britannica. Vol. 13 (11th ed.). Cambridge University Press. p. 280.

=== Secondary ===
- Coureas, Nicholas (2015). "The Latin and Greek Churches in former Byzantine Lands under Latin Rule". In Tsougarakis, Nickiphoros I.; Lock, Peter (eds.). A Companion to Latin Greece. Brill.
- Fine, J. V. A. (1994). The Late Medieval Balkans, A Critical Survey from the Late Twelfth Century to the Ottoman Conquest. University of Michigan Press.
- Gardner, A. (1912). The Lascarids of Nicæa, The Story of an Empire in Exile. Methuen.
- Joinville and Villehardouin (1963). Chronicles of the Crusades. Translated by Shaw, M. R. B. Penguin.
- Nicol, Donald M. (2002). The Last Centuries of Byzantium, 1261–1453. Cambridge University Press.
- Noble, Peter S. (2006). "Henry of Constantinople (d. 1216)". In Murray, Alan V. (ed.). The Crusades: An Encyclopedia. Vol. 2. ABC-CLIO.
- Noble, Peter S. (2019). "Henry of Constantinople". In Tucker, Spencer C. (ed.). Middle East Conflicts from Ancient Egypt to the 21st Century: An Encyclopedia and Document Collection. Vol. II. ABC-CLIO.
- Ostrogorsky, George (1969). History of the Byzantine State. Rutgers University Press.
- Sturdza, M. D. (1999). Dictionnaire Historique et Généalogique des Grandes Familles de Grèce, d'Albanie et de Constantinople (2e ed.). Chez l'auteur.
- Van Tricht, Filip (2011). The Latin "Renovatio" of Byzantium: The Empire of Constantinople (1204–1228). Translated by Longbottom, Peter. Brill.

Henry of Flanders House of Hainaut Born: c. 1176 Died: 11 June 1216
Regnal titles
Preceded by Baldwin I	Latin Emperor of Constantinople; 1206–1216	Succeeded by Peter and Yolanda
