= Maria of Bulgaria, Latin Empress =

Latin Empress from 1213 to 1216

Maria of Bulgaria

Latin Empress consort of Constantinople
- Tenure: c. 1213–1216
- Spouse: Henry of Flanders
- House: Asen dynasty
- Father: Kaloyan of Bulgaria
- Mother: Kumankata

Maria of Bulgaria was the second empress consort of Henry of Flanders, Latin Emperor of Constantinople.

== Family ==
She was a daughter of Kaloyan of Bulgaria. Her mother may have been his wife Anna of Cumania, who went on to marry Boril of Bulgaria, a nephew of her first husband. Her paternal uncles included Peter IV of Bulgaria and Ivan Asen I of Bulgaria.

== Empress consort ==
In 1213, Maria married Henry of Flanders of the Latin Empire. According to The Late Medieval Balkans (1987) by John V. A. Fine, the marriage was part of an alliance between her stepfather Boril and Henry. The alliance would benefit the Latin Empire by securing Thrace and Kingdom of Thessalonica from the threat of invasion from the Second Bulgarian Empire, allowing Henry to turn his attention to facing the Empire of Nicaea instead. On the other hand, Boril had suffered losses in both men and territory while the war continued. Unable at the moment to expand his borders, he might have seen the alliance as a way to secure his own borders from Latin invasion. In any case the marriage concluded the first phase of the Bulgarian–Latin wars.

On 11 June 1216, Henry died in Thessaloniki. Maria was reportedly suspected of having poisoned him. Her further fate is unknown. Their marriage was childless and Henry was succeeded by his brother-in-law Peter II of Courtenay.

== Sources ==
- Fine, John Van Antwerp (1994). The Late Medieval Balkans: A Critical Survey from the Late Twelfth Century to the Ottoman Conquest. Ann Arbor: University of Michigan Press. ISBN 978-0-472-08260-5.

Maria of Bulgaria, Latin Empress Asen Born: ? Died: ?
Royal titles
Preceded by Agnes of Montferrat	Latin Empress consort of Constantinople c. 1213–1216	Succeeded by Lady of Neuville
