= Berengaria of León =

Latin Empress from 1229 to 1237

Latin Empress consort
- Tenure: 1229 – 27 March 1237
- Born: 1204
- Died: 12 April 1237 (aged 32–33); Constantinople, Latin Empire (modern-day Istanbul, Turkey)
- Burial: Constantinople
- Spouse: John, Latin Emperor (m. 1224; died 1237)
- Issue: Marie, Latin Empress; Alphonse, Count of Eu; Louis, Viscount of Beaumont; John, Grand Butler of France
- House: Castilian House of Ivrea
- Father: Alfonso IX of León
- Mother: Berengaria of Castile

Berengaria of León (Note: Martínez calls her Berenguela.) (1204 – 12 April 1237) was the third wife but only empress consort of John of Brienne, Latin Emperor of Constantinople. She was a daughter of Alfonso IX of León and Berengaria of Castile. She was a younger sister of Ferdinand III of Castile and Alfonso of Molina.

== Marriage ==
In 1217, Berengaria's brother Ferdinand III had inherited the throne of the Kingdom of Castile through abdication of their mother.

In 1223, John of Brienne, aged 53, visited Santiago de Compostela, as a supposed pilgrim. He was by then twice a widower. As a consequence of his visit to Santiago de Compostela, Alfonso IX invited him to marry his daughter Sancha and, presumably, through her inherit the Leonese throne. However Berengaria of Castile, a long time divorced and an inheritor in her own right of the Castilian throne, main advisor of her son Ferdinand III, offered one of her own daughters to John instead.

Aging John chose Berengaria of León, from Alfonso's second marriage. The marriage took place at Toledo in 1224.

== Empress ==
In 1229, the throne of the Latin Empire had been inherited by Baldwin II of Constantinople, a twelve-year-old boy. The barons of the Empire decided to secure the safety of the Empire by appointing an Emperor-regent for Baldwin. They chose John who accepted the assignment as a sort of Senior Tutor. In April 1229, John was elected emperor at Perugia. They did not arrive at Constantinople until 1231, when John was officially crowned in his new city.

Baldwin II remained the junior co-emperor and only heir to the throne. By agreement, 12-year-old Baldwin had been betrothed to the 5-year-old Marie of Brienne, the daughter of John and Berengaria, since 19 April 1229 to firmly establish the dynastic alliance of the two co-emperors.

The marriage did not take place until 1234, when Marie was about ten years old and Baldwin was about seventeen.

Alberic of Trois-Fontaines records that John died on 27 March 1237, aged around 61. The "Obituaires de Sens Tome" of the Abbey of Maubuisson record that Berengaria died on 12 April 1237, aged around 33, surviving her husband by only sixteen days.

She is buried in a marble coffin in the Cathedral of Santiago de Compostela, Spain, but many books confuse her coffin with her mother's, Queen Berenguela of Castile.

Other books, however, confuse her coffin as being that of her niece Infanta Berengaria (1228–1288), a nun at the Cistercian monastery Santa María la Real at Las Huelgas.

== Children ==
Berengaria and John had:

1. Berenguela, d. 1236
2. Marie of Brienne (c. 1224–1275), who married Baldwin II of Constantinople
3. Alphonso of Brienne (c. 1220 – 14 September 1270), Count of Eu and Grand Chamberlain of France.
4. John II of Brienne (c. 1230–1296), who in 1258 became Grand Butler of France. Married Jeanne, Dame de Chateaudun, daughter of Geoffrey VI, Viscount of Châteaudun. His second wife was Marie de Coucy, widow of Alexander II of Scotland.
5. Louis of Brienne (died in 1297), Viscount of Beaumont. He was the father of Henry de Beaumont.

== Sources ==
- Martínez, H. Salvador (2021). Berenguela the Great and Her Times (1180–1246). Translated by Cisneros, Odile. Brill.
- Szabolcs de Vajay, "From Alfonso VIII to Alfonso X" in Studies in Genealogy and Family History in Tribute to Charles Evans on the Occasion of his Eightieth Birthday, 1989, pp. 366–417.

Royal titles
Preceded by Lady of Neuville	Latin Empress consort of Constantinople; 1229–1237 with Marie of Brienne (1234–1237)	Succeeded by Marie of Brienne
