= Robert of Courtenay =

Latin Emperor from 1221 to 1228

Robert
- Emperor and Autocrat of the Romans
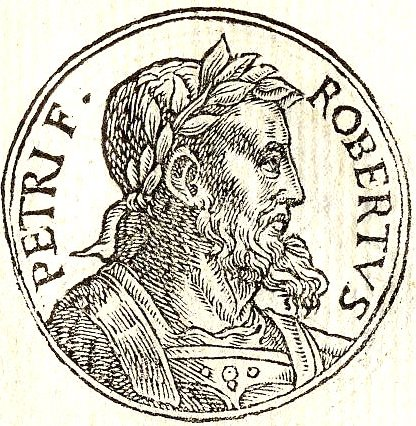

Latin Emperor of Constantinople
- Reign: 25 March 1221 – 1228
- Coronation: 25 March 1221
- Predecessor: Yolande
- Successor: Baldwin II
- Born: 1201
- Died: 1228 (aged 26–27); Morea, Principality of Achaea
- Spouse: Lady of Neuville
- House: Capetian House of Courtenay
- Father: Peter II of Courtenay
- Mother: Yolanda of Flanders

Robert of Courtenay (1201 - 1228), also known as Robert I, was the Latin emperor of Constantinople from 1221 until his death in 1228. He was a younger son of his predecessors, Peter II of Courtenay and Yolanda of Flanders.

After the death of Empress Yolanda in 1219, her eldest son, Marquis Philip II of Namur, renounced the succession to the Latin empire of Constantinople in favor of his brother Robert, who set out to take possession of his distracted inheritance. On the way to his new homeland, Robert stayed in Hungary from autumn 1220 to early 1221, enjoying the hospitality of his brother-in-law Andrew II of Hungary. It is possible that Villard de Honnecourt also belonged to his entourage. Robert and Andrew made political alliance against Theodore Komnenos Doukas, despot of Epirus. Andrew II and his heir Béla escorted Robert until the Bulgarian border. There Robert mediated the wedding between Tsar Ivan Asen II and Andrew's daughter, Anna Maria.

Crowned emperor on 25 March 1221, Robert's first loss was Thessalonica in 1224 to Theodore Doukas of Epirus. Worried about the situation of the Latin Empire, Pope Honorius III called for a crusade for the defense of Thessalonica, but the response was ineffective. In the same year, Robert's empire would suffer another defeat to John III Doukas Vatatzes, emperor of Nicaea, at the Battle of Poimanenos.

Following this defeat Robert was compelled to make peace with John III, who was confirmed in all his conquests. Robert promised to marry Eudokia, daughter of the late emperor of Nicaea, Theodore I Lascaris and Anna Angelina. He had been betrothed to Eudokia on a former occasion; the circumstances surrounding the failed negotiations are unclear, but George Akropolites states that the arrangement was blocked on religious grounds by the Orthodox Patriarch Manuel Sarantenos: Robert's sister Marie de Courtenay was married to Emperor Theodore I Laskaris. Accordingly, Robert, already Theodore's brother-in-law, could not also be his son-in-law. Regardless, Robert soon repudiated this engagement, and married the Lady of Neuville, already the fiancée of a Burgundian gentleman. Heading a conspiracy, the Burgundian drove Robert from Constantinople, he fled to Rome to seek redress from the pope who convinced him to return to Constantinople, but on his return trip, in early 1228, the emperor died in Morea.

== Notes ==
Robert of Courtenay House of Courtenay Died: 1228
Regnal titles
| Vacant Title last held by Yolanda of Flanders | Latin Emperor of Constantinople; 1221–1228 | Succeeded by Baldwin II of Constantinople |
