= Baldwin II, Latin Emperor =

Latin Emperor from 1228 to 1261

Baldwin II
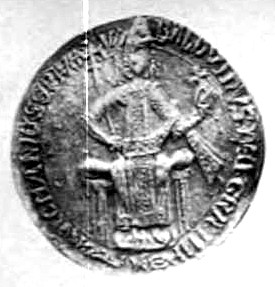
- Seal of Baldwin II

Latin Emperor of Constantinople
- Reign: 1228–1273 (in exile 1261–1273)
- Coronation: 15 April 1240
- Predecessor: Robert of Courtenay
- Successor: Michael VIII (as restored Byzantine emperor); Philip I (as titular)
- Co-emperor: John of Brienne (1229–1237)
- Born: c. 1217; Constantinople (modern-day Istanbul, Turkey)
- Died: October 1273 (aged 55–56); Naples (modern-day Italy)
- Spouse: Marie of Brienne (m. 1234)
- Issue: Philip of Courtenay
- House: Courtenay
- Father: Peter II of Courtenay
- Mother: Yolanda of Flanders

Baldwin of Courtenay (French: Baudouin de Courtenay; Greek: Βαλδουίνος Β΄ του Κουρτεναί; late 1217 – October 1273), also known as Baldwin II, was the last Latin emperor ruling in Constantinople. He was the only Latin emperor born in Constantinople.

== Biography ==
Baldwin II was born in Constantinople, a younger son of Peter II of Courtenay and Yolanda of Flanders, sister of the first two emperors, Baldwin I and Henry. Yolanda had been followed by her son Robert, on whose death in 1228 the succession passed to Baldwin, then an 11-year-old boy.

The barons chose John of Brienne as Baldwin's co-ruler for life. Baldwin was also to marry Marie of Brienne, daughter of John and his third wife, Berenguela of Leon, and on John's death, to enjoy the full imperial sovereignty. The marriage contract was carried out in 1234. Since the death of Baldwin's uncle , Emperor Henry in 1216, the Latin Empire had declined, and the Byzantine (Nicene) power advanced, and the hopes that John of Brienne might restore it were disappointed.

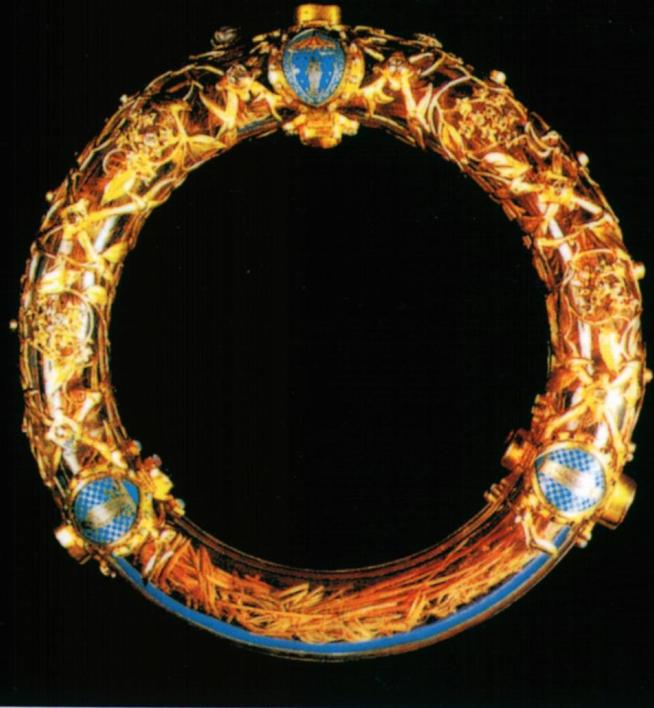
The Holy Crown of Jesus Christ was bought by Louis IX from Baldwin II. It was preserved in a 19th-century reliquary in Notre-Dame Cathedral, Paris, until recently relocating to the Louvre after the 2019 fire.

The realm Baldwin governed contained little beyond than the city of Constantinople. He adopted the Byzantine title of porphyrogenetos. His financial situation was desperate, and his life was chiefly occupied with begging at European courts. He went to the West in 1236, visiting Rome, France, and Flanders, trying to raise money and men to recover the lost territory of his realm. In 1237, with the support of the King of France and the Countess of Flanders, he chased his sister Margaret from power to become the next Marquis of Namur. But Baldwin was practically never present, and after the invasion and conquest of Namur by Henry V, Count of Luxembourg in 1256, he sold the rights on the county to his cousin Guy, Count of Flanders.

In around March 1238, Baldwin II's regency council pawned the Crown of Thorns to the Venetian Podestà of Constantinople for 13,134 hyperpyra from a "consortium of creditors". His efforts met with success, and in 1240 he returned to Constantinople (through Germany and Hungary) at the head of a considerable army. Circumstances hindered him from accomplishing anything with this help, and in 1245 he traveled again to the West, first to Italy and then to France, where he spent two years. The empress Marie and Philip of Toucy governed during his absence. He was happy to be able to get money from King Louis IX in exchange for relics. In 1249 he was with King Louis at Damietta.

The extremity of his financial straits reduced him soon afterwards to handing over his only son, Philip, to Venetian merchants as a pledge for loans of money. Philip was later redeemed by Alfonso X of Castile. Baldwin spent the rest of his reign in mendicant tours in western Europe.

On the night of 24 July 1261, a group of soldiers under Alexios Strategopoulos entered Constantinople through a secret passageway and captured the city. Baldwin was asleep in the Blachernae Palace when the noise of the fighting awoke him; upon seeing the Byzantine troops advance upon him, he fled in such haste that he left his crown and sceptre behind him. Baldwin made his way to the harbor, where he boarded a Venetian galley to Negropont. From there he proceeded to Athens, then to Apulia, and finally to France. As titular emperor, his role was still the same: to beg help from the western powers. In 1267 he went to Italy; his hopes were centred on Charles of Anjou. Charles seriously entertained the idea of conquering Constantinople, though his efforts were destroyed during the Sicilian Vespers, an event perhaps engineered by Michael VIII Palaeologus of Constantinople. To this intent, he signed the Treaty of Viterbo with Baldwin (May 1267). During the next year Baldwin and his son Philip lived on pensions from Charles. In October 1273 Philip married Beatrice, daughter of Charles, at Foggia. A few days later Baldwin died in Naples. Under Baldwin II, Constantinople's population had fallen to a mere 35,000 inhabitants.

== Sources ==
- Angold, Michael (2011). "The Latin Empire of Constantinople, 1204–1261: Marriage Strategies". Identities and Allegiances in the Eastern Mediterranean after 1204. Farnham: Ashgate Publishing Limited. pp. 47–68. ISBN 9781409410980.
- Bury, John Bagnell (1911). "Baldwin II." . In Chisholm, Hugh (ed.). Encyclopædia Britannica. Vol. 3 (11th ed.). Cambridge University Press. p. 245.
- Geanakoplos, Deno John (1953). "Greco-Latin Relations on the Eve of the Byzantine Restoration: The Battle of Pelagonia–1259". Dumbarton Oaks Papers. 7: 99–141. doi:10.2307/1291057. JSTOR 1291057.
- Harris, Jonathan, Byzantium and the Crusades, Bloomsbury, 2nd ed., 2014. ISBN 978-1-78093-767-0
- Lock, Peter (2013). The Franks in the Aegean: 1204–1500. Routledge. ISBN 978-1317899723.
- Nicol, Donald M. (1993). The Last Centuries of Byzantium, 1261-1453 (2 ed.). Cambridge University Press. ISBN 978-0521439916.
- Ostrogorsky, George (1956). History of the Byzantine State. Oxford: Basil Blackwell.
- Perry, Guy (2013). John of Brienne: King of Jerusalem, Emperor of Constantinople, c. 1175–1237. Cambridge: Cambridge University Press. ISBN 9781107043107.
- Rosser, John H. (2001). Historical Dictionary of Byzantium. Scarecrow Press. ISBN 978-0810866218.
- Wolff, Robert L. (1954). "Mortgage and Redemption of an Emperor's Son: Castile and the Latin Empire of Constantinople". Speculum. 29 (29): 45–84. doi:10.2307/2853868. JSTOR 2853868.

Baldwin II, Latin Emperor House of Courtenay Born: 1217 Died: October 1273
Royal titles
Preceded by Robert	Latin Emperor of Constantinople; 1228–1261 with John of Brienne (1229–1237)	Succeeded by Michael VIII Palaiologos as Byzantine Emperor
Preceded by Margaret	Marquis of Namur; 1237–1256	Succeeded by Henry III
Titles in pretence
Loss of title Loss of Constantinople	— TITULAR — Latin Emperor of Constantinople; 1261–1273	Succeeded by Philip
