= Latin Empire =

Crusader state that replaced the Byzantine Empire from 1204–1261

Empire of Romania Imperium Romaniae, Imperium Constantinopolitanum (Latin)
- 1204–1261 (Note: The Byzantines retook Constantinople under Emperor Michael VIII Palaiologos in 1261. Latin possessions remained in Greece until the Ottoman Empire captured the island of Tinos from the Venetians in 1715, and the various surviving Latin states continued to recognize a lineage of Latin Emperors until the death of James of Baux in 1383.)
- Attributed arms (Note: Arms used by Philip of Courtenay, who held the title of Latin Emperor of Constantinople from 1273 to 1283, even though Constantinople had been reinstated to the Byzantines in 1261. This design, was sometimes presented as the "arms of the emperors of Constantinople" in early modern heraldry.)

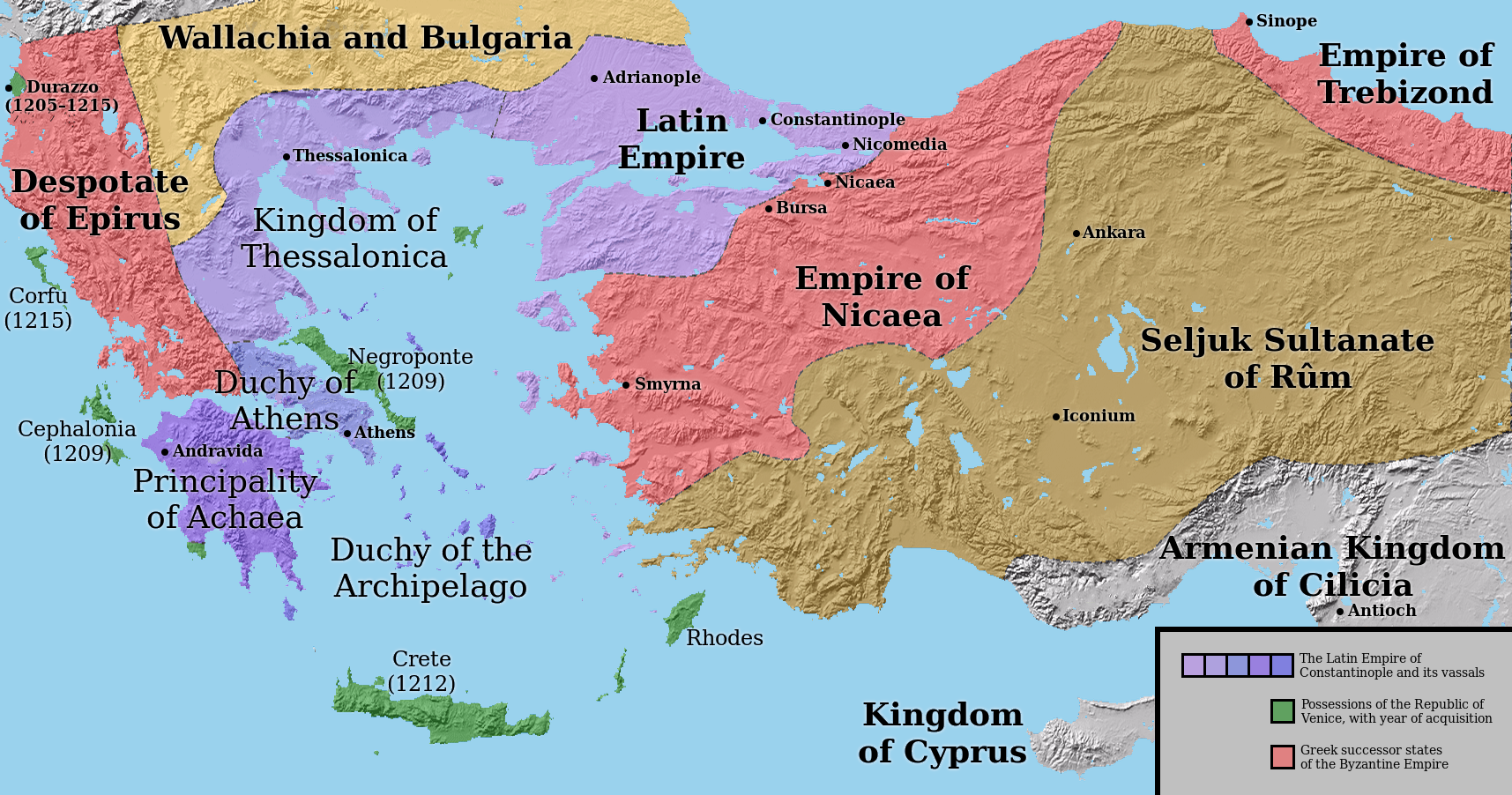
- The Latin Empire (in purple) with its vassals in 1204
- Capital: Constantinople
- Common languages: Latin, Old French (de jure); Greek (de facto)
- Religion: Latin Catholic (official); Greek Orthodox (popular)
- Government: Feudal monarchy
- Emperor
  - 1204–1205: Baldwin I
  - 1205–1216: Henry
  - 1217–1217: Peter
  - 1217–1219: Yolanda
  - 1221–1228: Robert I
  - 1229–1237: John
  - 1228–1261: Baldwin II
- Historical era: High Middle Ages
  - Sack of Constantinople: 1204
  - Joint Nicean-Bulgarian campaign against Empire: 1235
  - Disestablished: 1261 (Note: The Byzantines retook Constantinople under Emperor Michael VIII Palaiologos in 1261. Latin possessions remained in Greece until the Ottoman Empire captured the island of Tinos from the Venetians in 1715, and the various surviving Latin states continued to recognize a lineage of Latin Emperors until the death of James of Baux in 1383.)

Area
- 1204 est.: 179,000 km^{2} (69,000 sq mi)
- 1209 est.: 206,000 km^{2} (80,000 sq mi)
- 1228 est.: 47,000 km^{2} (18,000 sq mi)
- 1260 est.: 14,000 km^{2} (5,400 sq mi)
Preceded by
Byzantine Empire (Angelos dynasty)
Succeeded by
Byzantine Empire (Palaiologos dynasty)
Principality of Achaea
Duchy of Athens
Duchy of the Archipelago

The Latin Empire, also referred to as the Latin Empire of Constantinople or the Constantinopolitan Empire, and officially the Empire of Romania, was a feudal Crusader state founded by the leaders of the Fourth Crusade on lands captured from the Byzantine Empire. It existed from 1204 until its disestablishment in 1261. The Latin Empire was intended to replace the Byzantine Empire as the Western-recognized Roman Empire in the east, with a Catholic emperor enthroned in place of the Eastern Orthodox Roman emperors. The main objective to form a Latin Empire was planned over the course of the Fourth Crusade, promoted by crusade leaders such as Boniface I of Montferrat, as well as the Republic of Venice.

The Fourth Crusade had originally been called to retake the Muslim-controlled city of Jerusalem, but a sequence of economic and political events culminated in the Crusader army sacking the city of Constantinople, the capital of the Byzantine Empire. Originally, the plan had been to restore the deposed Byzantine Emperor Isaac II Angelos to the throne, which had been usurped by Alexios III Angelos. The crusaders had been promised financial and military aid by Isaac's son Alexios IV, with which they had planned to continue to Jerusalem. When the crusaders reached Constantinople, the situation quickly turned volatile, and while Isaac and Alexios briefly ruled, the crusaders did not receive the payment they had hoped for. In April 1204, they captured and plundered the city's enormous wealth.

The crusaders selected their own emperor from among their own ranks, Baldwin IX of Flanders, and divided the territory of the Byzantine Empire into various new vassal crusader states. The Latin Empire's authority was immediately challenged by Byzantine rump states led by the Laskaris family (connected to the Angelos dynasty of 1185–1204) in Nicaea, by the Komnenos family (which had ruled as Byzantine Emperors 1081–1185) in Trebizond, and by the Komnenos Doukas family in Epirus and Thessalonica (especially from 1224 to 1242). The Latin Empire failed to attain political or economic dominance over the other Latin powers that had been established in former Byzantine territories in the wake of the Fourth Crusade, especially Venice, and after a short initial period of military successes, it went into a steady decline due to constant war with Bulgaria to the north and the various Byzantine claimants. Eventually, the Nicene Empire recovered Constantinople and restored the Byzantine Empire under Michael VIII Palaiologos in 1261. The last Latin emperor, Baldwin II, went into exile, but the imperial title survived, with several pretenders to it, until the 14th century.

== Etymology ==
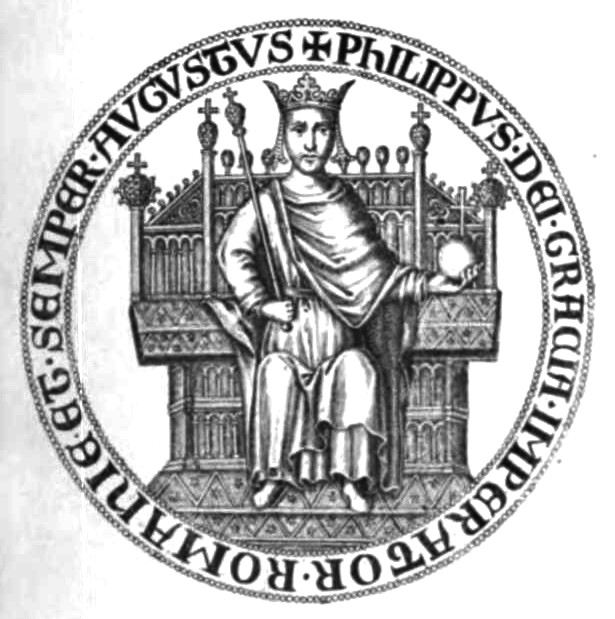
Seal of Philip of Courtenay, Latin Emperor in exile 1273–1283. His title in the seal is Dei gratia imperator Romaniae et semper augustus ("By the Grace of God, Emperor of Romania, ever august").

The term "Latin Empire" was not contemporary, and was first used by historians in the 16th century to distinguish the Crusader state from the classical Roman Empire and the Byzantine Empire, all of which called themselves "Roman". The term "Latin" was chosen because the crusaders (Franks, Venetians, and other Westerners) were Roman Catholic and used Latin as their liturgical and scholarly language in contrast to the Eastern Orthodox locals who used Greek in both liturgy and common speech. The Byzantines referred to the Latin Empire as the Frankokratia 'rule of the Franks', or the Latinokratia 'rule of the Latins'.

Founding treaties issued by the crusaders specifically refer to the empire as the imperium Constantinopolitanum ("Constantinopolitan Empire"). Although this is a marked departure from the standard Byzantine nomenclature and ideology, designating the empire as the Basileía Rhōmaíōn 'Empire of the Romans', imperium Constantinopolitanum was the standard name used for the eastern empire in western sources, such as in papal correspondence, and suggests that the Latin leaders viewed themselves as "taking over" the empire rather than "replacing" it. It would have been difficult for the crusaders to justify referring to the empire as "Roman" considering that Western Europe generally held the Germanic Holy Roman Empire to represent the legitimate Roman Empire. These two conclusions—that for outsiders the Roman identity of this empire remained controversial and that its conquest was considered a takeover, not a replacement—are further supported by an entry in Deeds of the Bishops of Halberstadt, a contemporaneous chronicle made in Germany. When referring to the elevation of the first Latin Emperor, Baldwin I, the chronicle called him imperator Grecorum ("emperor of the Greeks"), the same title used on an earlier page for Alexios I Komnenos. Similarly, the Emperor Isaac Angelos is listed in the chronicle as rex Grecorum ("king of the Greeks").

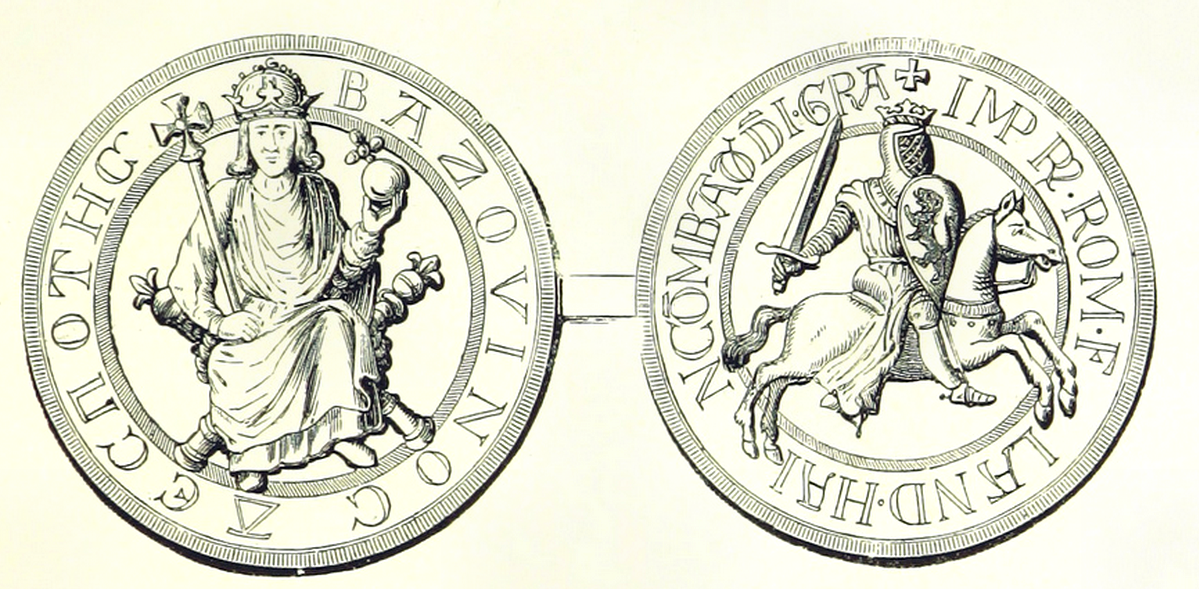
Seal of Baldwin I, the first Latin Emperor. The abbreviation Rom. leaves it open to interpretation if he refers to Romaniae 'Romania' or Romanorum 'the Romans'

The full title Baldwin actually used was dei gratia fidelissimus in Christo imperator a Deo coronatus Romanorum moderator et semper augustus, a near perfect replication of the one used by Alexios IV Angelos, placed on the throne by the crusaders previously, in a letter (only known in its Latin version) to Pope Innocent III: fidelis in Christo imperator a Deo coronatus Romanorum moderator et semper augustus. Letters by Baldwin to Pope Innocent III give his title as imperator Constantinopolitanus, possibly altered by Papal scribes as the Pope recognized the Holy Roman Emperor as the imperator Romanorum. In his seals, Baldwin abbreviated Romanorum as Rom., conveniently leaving it open for interpretation whether he referred to Romaniae 'land of the Romans' or Romanorum 'the Romans'. It is probably more likely that he meant Romanorum. Baldwin's successor Henry called the empire imperium Romanum at least in one letter. A Venetian statesman Marino Sanuto the Elder used yet another appellative, Sebastō Latíno Basilía ton Rhōmaíōn (Σεβαστό Λατίνο βασιλιά των Ρωμαίων, lit. "August Latin Empire of the Romans"). The term "Romania" had been a vernacular name used for centuries by the population of the Late Roman polity for their country.

Three different versions of imperial titulature are attested under Henry; Henricus Dei Gratia Imperator Romaniae 'Emperor of Romania', Henricus Dei Gratia Imperator Romanorum 'Emperor of the Romans' and Henricus Dei Gratia Imperator Constantinopolitani 'Constantinopolitan Emperor', possibly intended for different recipients. Usage of the title Emperor of Constantinople may not just have been to appease the Pope and Western Europe, but might also have been used to legitimize the rule of the Latin Emperors in regards to the Byzantines that they ruled. Possession of the city itself was a key legitimizing factor that set the Latin Emperors apart from Byzantine claimants in Nicaea, Trebizond and Thessalonica.

== History ==
=== Origins ===
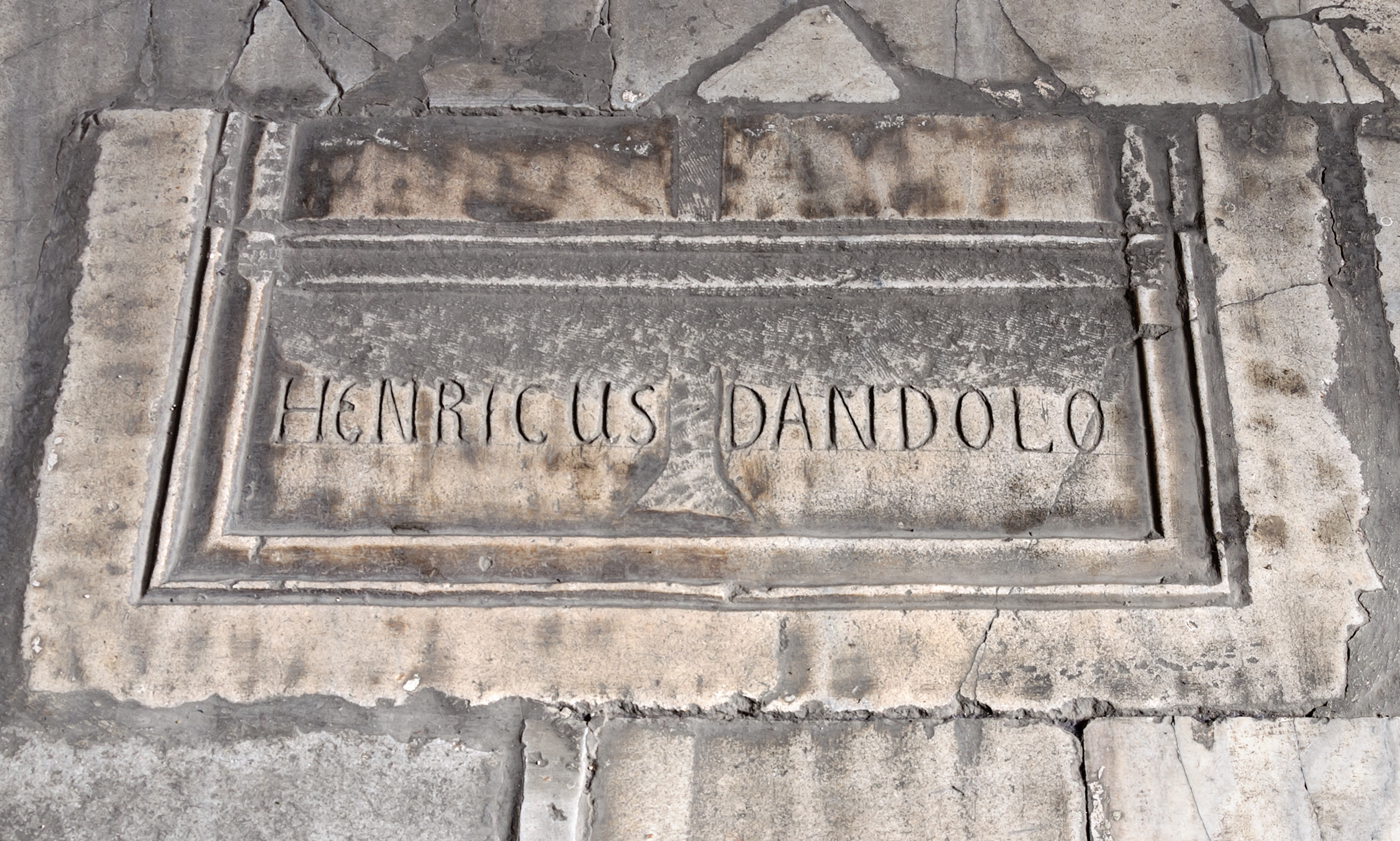
A 19th century tomb marker of the probable location of the tomb of Enrico Dandolo, the leader of the Fourth Crusade and Doge of Venice, inside the Hagia Sophia

After the Sack of Constantinople, the crusaders agreed to divide up Byzantine territory. In the Partitio terrarum imperii Romaniae, signed on 1 October 1204, three eighths of the empire—including Crete and other islands—went to the Republic of Venice. The Latin Empire claimed the remainder and exerted control over:

- areas of Greece, divided into vassal fiefs:
  - the Kingdom of Thessalonica
  - the Principality of Achaea
  - the Duchy of Athens
  - the Duchy of the Archipelago
- the short-lived Duchy of Philippopolis in north Thrace

Further duchies were projected in Asia Minor, at Nicaea (for Louis of Blois), Nicomedia (Thierry de Loos), Philadelphia (Stephen du Perche), and Neokastra. These duchies remained theoretical, due to the establishment of the Empire of Nicaea in the area. Nicaea itself was never occupied and Louis of Blois was killed in 1205. Thierry de Loos was captured by the Nicaeans in 1207 and, although released, left the Latin Empire two years later. After a brief Nicaean reconquest, Nicomedia returned to Latin control, but the ducatus Nichomedie remained part of the Imperial domain. Philadelphia never came under actual Latin control, although the Latin emperor Henry of Flanders laid claim to the region after defeating the local strongman, Theodore Mangaphas, in 1205. The duchy of Neokastra (ducatus Novi Castri) on the other hand was never accorded to a single holder, but was divided among the Knights Hospitaller (one quarter) and other feudatories. The term "duchy" in this case reflects the earlier Byzantine term theme, usually governed by a doux, to designate a province.

The Doge of Venice did not rank as a vassal to the Latin Empire. Still, his position in control of three-eighths of its territory and of parts of Constantinople itself ensured Venice's influence in the Empire's affairs. However, much of the former Byzantine territory remained in the hands of rival successor states led by Byzantine Greek aristocrats, such as the Despotate of Epirus, the Empire of Nicaea, and the Empire of Trebizond, each bent on reconquest from the Latins.

On 9 May 1204, Baldwin I was elected the emperor with Venetian support, and crowned on 16 May in the Hagia Sophia in a ceremony that closely followed Eastern Roman practices. Not long after the coronation, Baldwin ventured out into the Thracian countryside, posturing not as a conqueror but as a legitimate ruler, expecting to be universally acclaimed by the populace as the Emperor of the Romans. The establishment of the Latin Empire had the curious effect of creating five simultaneously existing polities claiming to be the Roman Empire: the Latin empire, the Holy Roman Empire, and the three remnants of the Byzantine Empire, the Despotate of Epirus, the empire of Nicaea, and the empire of Trebizond.

=== In Asia Minor ===
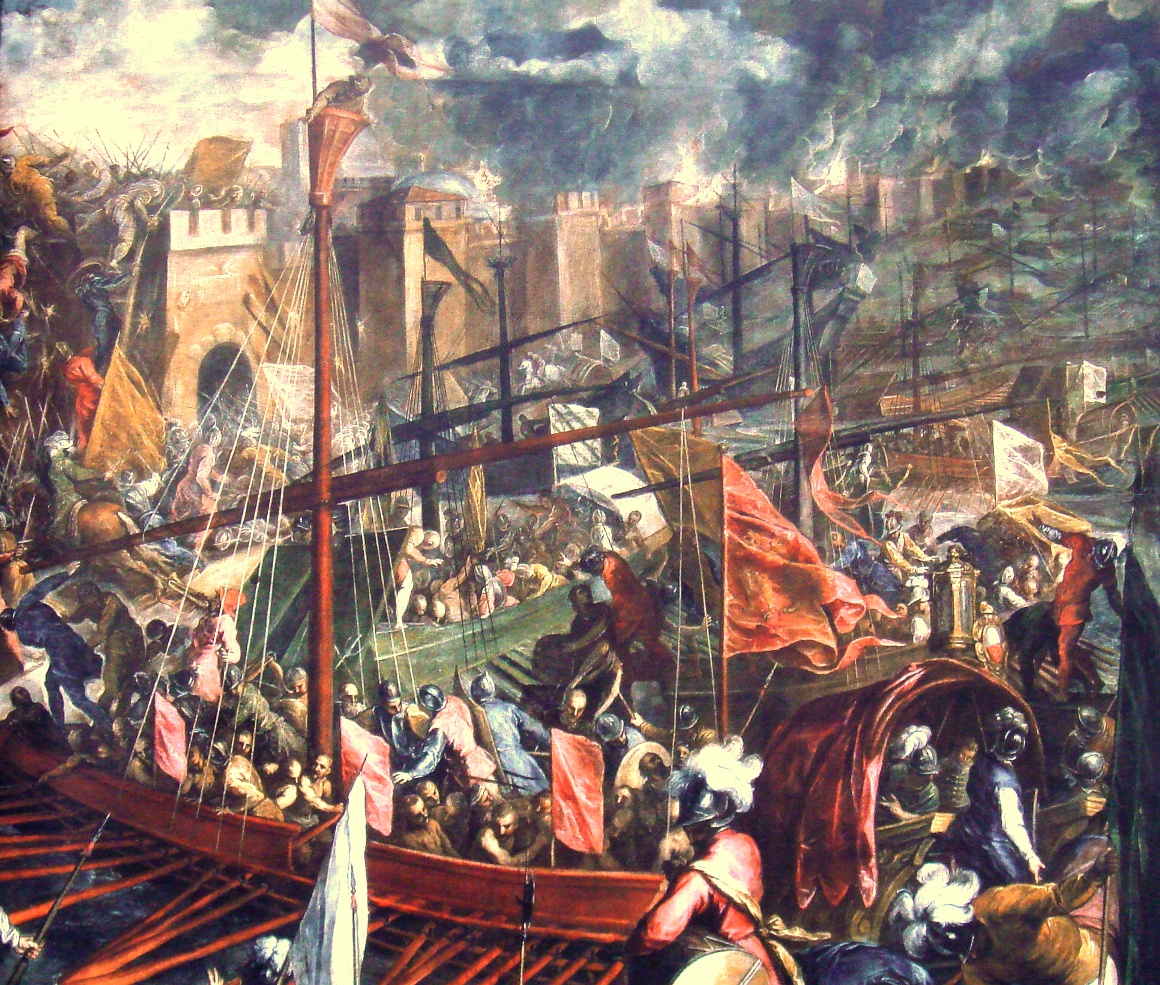
Capture of Constantinople during the Fourth Crusade in 1204.

The initial campaigns of the crusaders in Asia Minor resulted in the capture of most of Bithynia by 1205, with the defeat of the forces of Theodore I Laskaris at Poemanenum and Prusa. Latin successes continued, and in 1207 a truce was signed with Theodore, newly proclaimed Emperor of Nicaea. The Latins inflicted a further defeat on Nicaean forces at the Rhyndakos river in October 1211, and three years later the Treaty of Nymphaeum (1214) recognized their control of most of Bithynia and Mysia.

The peace was maintained until 1222, when the resurgent power of Nicaea felt sufficiently strong to challenge the Latin Empire, by that time weakened by constant warfare in its European provinces. At the battle of Poimanenon in 1224, the Latin army was defeated, and by the next year Emperor Robert of Courtenay was forced to cede all his Asian possessions to Nicaea, except for Nicomedia and the territories directly across from Constantinople. Nicaea turned also to the Aegean, capturing the islands awarded to the empire. In 1235, finally, the last Latin possessions fell to Nicaea.

=== In Europe ===
Unlike in Asia, where the Latin Empire faced only an initially weak Nicaea, in Europe it was immediately confronted with a powerful enemy: the Bulgarian tsar Kaloyan. When Baldwin campaigned against the Byzantine lords of Thrace, they called upon Kaloyan for help. At the Battle of Adrianople on 14 April 1205, the Latin heavy cavalry and knights were crushed by Kaloyan's troops and Cuman allies, and Emperor Baldwin was captured. He was imprisoned in the Bulgarian capital Tarnovo until his death later in 1205. Kaloyan was murdered a couple of years later (1207) during a siege of Thessalonica, and the Bulgarian threat conclusively defeated with a victory the following year, which allowed Baldwin's successor, Henry of Flanders, to reclaim most of the lost territories in Thrace until 1210, when peace was concluded with the marriage of Henry to Maria of Bulgaria, tsar Kaloyan's daughter.

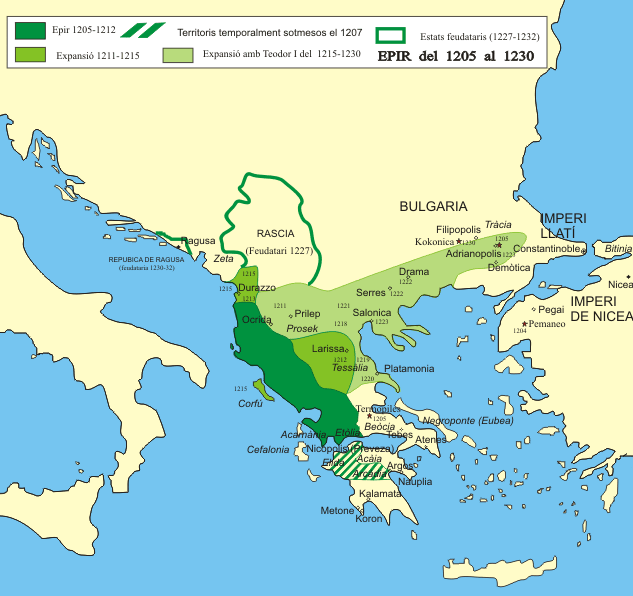
Despotate of Epirus, one of the successor states of the Byzantine Empire

At the same time, another Byzantine successor state, the Despotate of Epirus, under Michael I Komnenos Doukas, posed a threat to the empire's vassals in Thessalonica and Athens. Henry demanded his submission, which Michael provided, giving off his daughter to Henry's brother Eustace in the summer of 1209. This alliance allowed Henry to launch a campaign in Macedonia, Thessaly and Central Greece against the rebellious Lombard lords of Thessalonica. However, Michael's attack on the Kingdom of Thessalonica in 1210 forced him to return north to relieve the city and to force Michael back into submission.

In 1214 however, Michael died, and was succeeded by Theodore Komnenos Doukas, who was determined to capture Thessalonica. On 11 June 1216, while supervising repairs to the walls of Thessalonica, Henry died, and was succeeded in 1217 by Peter of Courtenay, who himself was captured and executed by Theodore. Peter's widow Yolanda of Flanders ruled alone in Constantinople until her death in 1219. Her son Robert of Courtenay being absent in France, the regency passed first to Conon de Béthune, and after his death shortly after, to Cardinal Giovanni Colonna, until 1221, when Robert of Courtenay arrived in Constantinople. Distracted by the renewed war with Nicaea, and waiting in vain for assistance from Pope Honorius III and the King of France Philip II, the Latin Empire was unable to prevent the final fall of Thessalonica to Epirus in 1224. Epirote armies then conquered Thrace in 1225–26, appearing before Constantinople itself. The Latin Empire was saved for a time by the threat posed to Theodore by the Bulgarian tsar Ivan II Asen, and a truce was concluded in 1228.

=== Decline and fall ===
After Robert of Courtenay died in 1228, a new regency under John of Brienne was set up. After the disastrous Epirote defeat by the Bulgarians at the Battle of Klokotnitsa, the Epirote threat to the Latin Empire was removed, only to be replaced by Nicaea, which started acquiring territories in Greece. Emperor John III Doukas Vatatzes of Nicaea concluded an alliance with Bulgaria, which in 1235 resulted in a joint campaign against the Latin Empire, and an unsuccessful siege of Constantinople the same year. In 1237, Baldwin II attained majority and took over the reins of a much-diminished state. The empire's precarious situation forced him to travel often to Western Europe seeking aid, but largely without success. In order to raise funds, he was forced to resort to desperate means, from removing the lead roofs of the Great Palace and selling them, to handing over his only son, Philip, to Venetian merchants as a guarantee for a loan.

By 1247, the Nicaeans had effectively surrounded the main holdings of the Emperor in the new European land system. Following the victory at the Battle of Pelagonia in 1259 Michael VIII Palaiologos of the Nicaean empire had only one obstacle in the Theodosian walls. He had already cut off the Latins from aid from the Latin estates of Greece or the Nicaeans rivals and also a successor state to the Byzantines the Despotate of Epirus.

The first attempt to take Constantinople occurred in 1260 when a Latin knight taken prisoner in Pelagonia, whose house was in the city walls, promised to open a gate for the emperor's troops. He failed to do so, and Palaiologos launched an unsuccessful assault on Galata Instead. In preparation for another attempt, an alliance with Genoa was concluded in March 1261, and in July 1261

As the one-year truce concluded after the failed Nicaean attack was nearing its end, the general Alexios Strategopoulos was sent with a small advance force of 800 soldiers (most of them Cumans) to keep a watch on the Bulgarians and spy out the defences of the Latins.

When the Nicaean force reached the village of Selymbria, some 30 miles (48 km) west of Constantinople, they learned from some independent local farmers (thelematarioi) that the entire Latin garrison, as well as the Venetian fleet, were absent conducting a raid against the Nicaean island of Daphnousia. Strategopoulos initially hesitated to take advantage of the situation, since his small force might be destroyed if the Latin army returned too soon, and because he would exceed the emperor's orders, but eventually decided he could not squander such a golden opportunity to retake the city.

On the night of 24/25 July 1261, Strategopoulos and his men approached the city walls and hid at a monastery near the Gate of the Spring. Strategopoulos sent a detachment of his men, led by some of the thelematarioi, to make their way to the city through a secret passage. They attacked the walls from the inside, surprised the guards and opened the gate, giving the Nicaean force entry into the city. The Latins were taken completely unaware, and after a short struggle, the Nicaeans gained control of the land walls. As news of this spread across the city, the Latin inhabitants, from Emperor Baldwin II downwards, hurriedly rushed to the harbours of the Golden Horn, hoping to escape by ship. At the same time, Strategopoulos' men set fire to the Venetian buildings and warehouses along the coast to prevent them from landing there. Thanks to the timely arrival of the returning Venetian fleet, many of the Latins managed to evacuate to the still Latin-held parts of Greece, but the city was lost.

Nicaean general Alexios Strategopoulos found an unguarded entrance to the city, and entered it with only 800 troops, restoring the Byzantine Empire for his master, Michael VIII Palaiologos.

The remaining Latin states ruled territories of present-day Greece, some of them until the 18th century, and are known as Latinokratia.

=== Titular claimants ===
Following the Byzantine recovery of Constantinople in 1261, Baldwin II and his successors continued to claim the imperial title and successive titular claimants sought military assistance in exchange for prospective political and commercial concessions. The title passed from Baldwin to his son Philip of Courtenay and subsequently through the female line to the Angevin princes of Taranto.

In 1373, James of Baux inherited the last imperial title from his uncle Philip II of Taranto. In 1380, the Navarrese Company entered the Morea in his service as he asserted a competing claim to the Principality of Achaea against Joanna I of Naples. He was recognised as prince of Achaea from 1381 until his death at Taranto on 7 July 1383.

== Organization and society ==
=== Administration ===
The empire was formed and administered on Western European feudal principles, incorporating some elements of the Byzantine bureaucracy. The emperor was assisted by a council, composed of the various barons, the Venetian Podestà of Constantinople and his six-member council. This council had a major voice in the governance of the realm, especially in periods of regency, when the Regent (moderator imperii) was dependent on their consent to rule. The podestà, likewise, was an extremely influential member, being practically independent of the emperor. He exercised authority over the Venetian quarters of Constantinople and Pera and the Venetian dominions within the empire, assisted by a separate set of officials. His role was more that of an ambassador and vicegerent of Venice than a vassal to the empire. The podestà was granted the title of Governor of One-Fourth and One-Half of the Empire of Romania, and was entitled to wearing the imperial crimson buskins like the emperor.

=== Economy ===
The Latins did not trust the professional Greek bureaucracy, and in the immediate aftermath of the conquest completely dismantled the Greek economic administration of the areas they controlled. The result was disastrous, disrupting all forms of production and trade. Almost from its inception the Latin Empire was sending requests back to the papacy for aid. For a few years, the major commodities it exported from the surrounding region of Thrace were wheat and furs; it also profited from Constantinople's strategic location on major trade routes. While the empire showed some moderate vitality while Henry of Flanders was alive, after his death in 1216 there was a major deficit in leadership. By the 1230s, Constantinople – even with its drastically reduced population – was facing a major shortage of basic foodstuffs. In several senses, the only significant export on which the economy of the Latin Empire had any real basis was the sale of relics back to Western Europe which had been looted from Greek churches. For example, Emperor Baldwin II sold the relic of the Crown of Thorns while in France trying to raise new funds.

=== Society ===
The elite of the empire were the Frankish and Venetian lords, headed by the emperor, the barons and the lower-ranking vassals and liege lords, including many former Byzantine aristocrats. The bulk of the people were Orthodox Greeks, still divided according to the Byzantine system in income classes based on land ownership.

=== Church ===
A Latin Catholic ecclesiastical hierarchy was established in the empire, alongside houses belonging to Western religious orders, including the Cistercians, Franciscans and Dominicans. The Greek bishops who accepted papal supremacy and the authority of the Latin patriarch could retain their sees, while Greek parish priests continued to serve the predominantly Orthodox population. Greek clergy nevertheless occupied a subordinate position within the Latin ecclesiastical order. Ecclesiastical administration was initially divided between the Latin patriarch of Constantinople and independently appointed papal legate. In 1231, Pope Gregory IX also conferred the legatine office upon the Latin patriarch, Simon of Tyre.

The Greek clergy retained elements of its rite, including a married priesthood. Pope Innocent III instructed the Latin patriarch, Thomas Morosini, to tolerate the Greek rite where its adherents could not be brought into conformity with Roman practice. Nevertheless, disputes continued over ordination, ecclesiastical jurisdiction and the collection of tithes.

=== Art ===
Known examples of artwork produced within the Latin Empire are almost non-existent. André Grabar speculated that this was either because they were destroyed, their production was disrupted by the suppression of the Greek clergy, or because they are difficult to distinguish from imitative artwork produced abroad. However, crusader rule over Constantinople led to an increasing awareness of Byzantine art in Italy, and contributed significantly to the Italo-Byzantine style. Prominent examples include the Italian painting Virgin and Child by Berlinghiero c.1230, which was modelled on a Byzantine icon type called the Hodegetria. After Constantinople was sacked by the Ottoman Turks in 1453 the original Hodegetria icon that was stored in the Hodegon Monastery is believed to have been destroyed.

== See also ==
- Timeline of the Latin Empire
- Succession of the Roman Empire

== Bibliography ==
- Angold, Michael (2011). "The Latin Empire of Constantinople, 1204–1261: Marriage Strategies". Identities and Allegiances in the Eastern Mediterranean after 1204. Farnham: Ashgate Publishing Limited. pp. 47–68. ISBN 9781409410980.
- Choniates, Nicetas (1984). O City of Byzantium, Annals of Niketas Choniatēs. Translated by Harry J. Magoulias. Detroit: Wayne State University Press. ISBN 0-8143-1764-2.
- Fine, John V. A. (1994) [1987]. The Late Medieval Balkans: A Critical Survey from the Late Twelfth Century to the Ottoman Conquest. Ann Arbor, Michigan: University of Michigan Press. ISBN 978-0-472-10079-8.
- Geanakoplos, Deno John (1953). "Greco-Latin Relations on the Eve of the Byzantine Restoration: The Battle of Pelagonia–1259". Dumbarton Oaks Papers. 7: 99–141. doi:10.2307/1291057. JSTOR 1291057.
- Geanakoplos, Deno John (1959). Emperor Michael Palaeologus and the West, 1258–1282: A Study in Byzantine-Latin Relations. Cambridge, Massachusetts: Harvard University Press.
- Hendrickx, Benjamin (2015). "Les duchés de l'Empire latin de Constantinople après 1204: origine, structures et statuts" [The Duchies of the Latin Empire of Constantinople after 1204. Origin, Structures and Statutes]. Revue belge de philologie et d'histoire (in French). 93 (2): 303–328. doi:10.3406/rbph.2015.8837.
- Jacoby, David (1999). "The Latin Empire of Constantinople and the Frankish States in Greece". In Abulafia, David (ed.). The New Cambridge Medieval History, Volume 5, c.1198–c.1300. Cambridge: Cambridge University Press. pp. 525–542. ISBN 978-1-13905573-4.
- Miller, William (1908). The Latins in the Levant: A History of Frankish Greece (1204–1566). London: John Murray.
- Nicol, Donald M. (1993) [1972]. The Last Centuries of Byzantium, 1261–1453 (Second ed.). Cambridge: Cambridge University Press. ISBN 978-0-521-43991-6.
- Ostrogorsky, George (1956). History of the Byzantine State. Oxford: Basil Blackwell.
- Perry, Guy (2013). John of Brienne: King of Jerusalem, Emperor of Constantinople, c. 1175–1237. Cambridge: Cambridge University Press. ISBN 9781107043107.
- Setton, Kenneth M. (1976). The Papacy and the Levant (1204–1571), Volume I: The Thirteenth and Fourteenth Centuries. Vol. 1. Philadelphia: The American Philosophical Society. ISBN 0-87169-114-0.
- Wolff, Robert Lee (1969) [1962]. "The Latin Empire of Constantinople, 1204–1261". In Setton, Kenneth M.; Wolff, Robert Lee; Hazard, Harry W. (eds.). A History of the Crusades, Volume II: The Later Crusades, 1189–1311. Vol. 2 (Second ed.). Madison, Milwaukee, and London: University of Wisconsin Press. pp. 186–233. ISBN 0-299-04844-6.
- Lock, Peter (2014) [1995]. The Franks in the Aegean, 1204–1500. London: Routledge. doi:10.4324/9781315846057. ISBN 9781315846057.
