= House of Laskaris =

Byzantine Greek noble family; ruling dynasty of the Empire of Nicaea (1204–1261)

Laskaris Λάσκαρις Laskarid dynasty
- Imperial dynasty
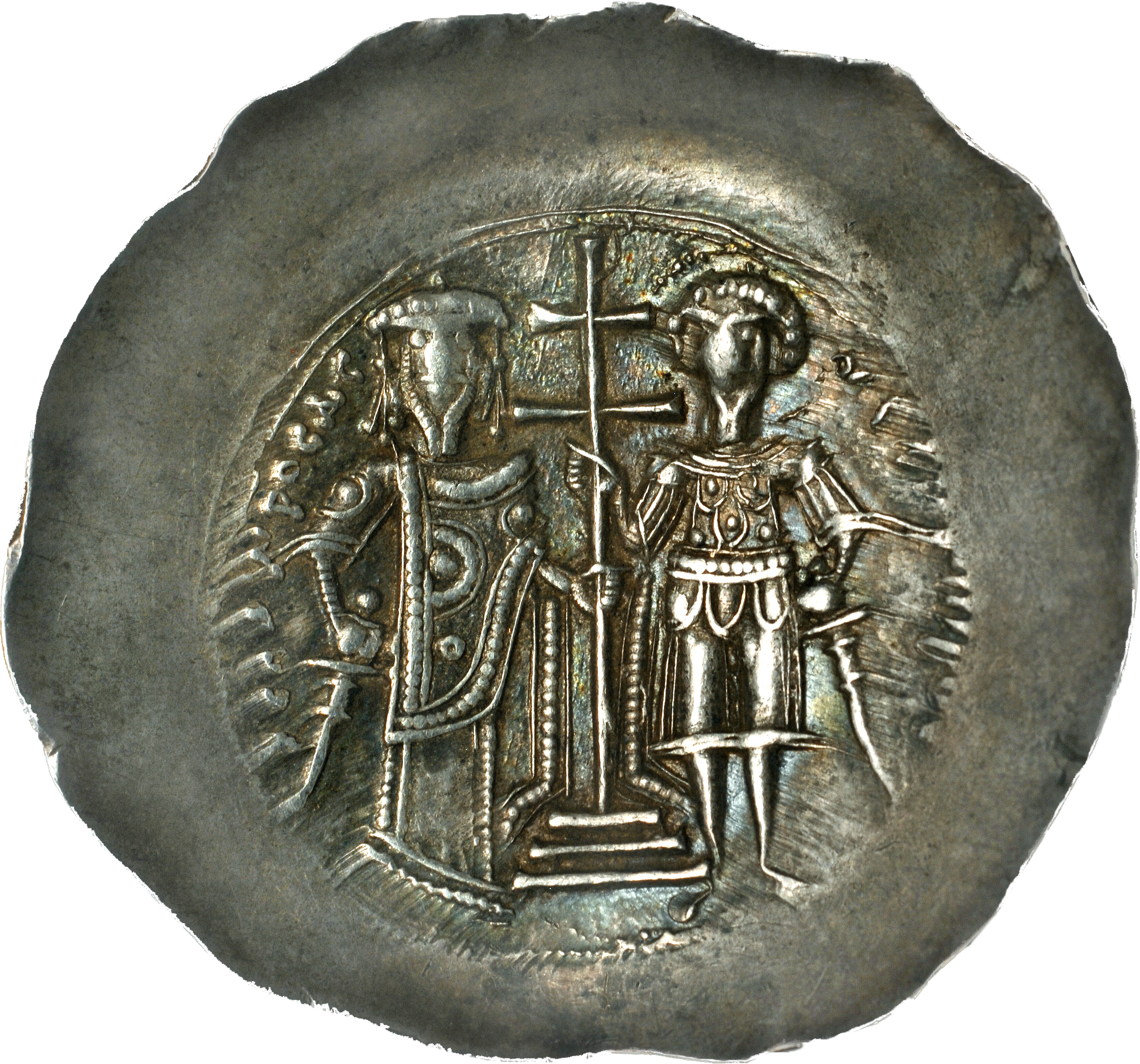
- Aspron of Theodore I Laskaris (r. 1205–1221)
- Country: Byzantine Empire; Empire of Nicaea
- Origin: Constantinople
- Founded: 1205; 821 years ago (Note: Constantine Laskaris was briefly elected Byzantine emperor in 1204. After the sack of Constantinople, Theodore was proclaimed emperor of Nicaea in 1205 and he was officially crowned in 1208.) (as imperial family)
- Founder: Theodore I Laskaris
- Final ruler: John IV Laskaris
- Titles: Byzantine Emperor; Emperor of Nicaea
- Traditions: Greek Orthodoxy
- Deposition: 1261; 765 years ago (Empire of Nicaea)

The Laskaris (Greek: Λάσκαρις (Láskaris), later Λάσκαρης; feminine form Laskarina; Greek: Λασκαρίνα), Latinized as Lascaris, was a Byzantine Greek noble family which rose to prominence during the late Byzantine period. The members of the family formed the ruling dynasty of the Empire of Nicaea, a Byzantine rump state that existed from the 1204 sack of Constantinople by the Fourth Crusade until the restoration of the Empire under the Palaeologan dynasty in 1261.

Upon the sack of the Byzantine capital by the Crusaders, Alexios V Doukas was overthrown and the Latin Empire was established in most of his former lands. Byzantine nobility would flee the Latin territories and establish the three independent Greek states that rivaled the Crusaders. After a successful resistance in Asia Minor, Theodore I Laskaris founded the Empire of Nicaea and laid claims to the Byzantine throne, along with the Angelos family of Epirus and the Komnenoi of Trebizond. The Byzantine Greek population of Asia Minor sought refuge to Theodore's empire, which gradually acquired control over much of western Anatolia. The empire was further strengthened after the military victories of Theodore's successor, John III Vatatzes. John's son, Theodore II Laskaris, maintained the empire's strength until the throne was passed to his underage son, John IV Laskaris. In 1259 John fell victim to an aristocratic conspiracy which managed to establish Michael Palaiologos as his regent and co-emperor.

The Nicaeans recaptured Constantinople in 1261 and Michael established the Palaiologos family as the new imperial dynasty. Under the Palaeologan rule, the Lascarids remained among the senior nobility up to the dissolution of the Byzantine Empire, whereupon many of them emigrated to Italy. Advertising their ties to the Komnenoi, early family members used the name 'Komnenos Laskaris', while two were additionally called 'Tzamantouros'.

== Name ==
The origin of the name is unclear. In 1928, the Greek scholar Phaedon Koukoules proposed an origin from daskaris (δάσκαρης), a Cappadocian variant for "teacher", but the δ>λ shift in Cappadocian is attested only in the late 19th century, so that its application to the mid-11th century or earlier is dubious. A year later, G. Stamnopoulos proposed an alternative etymology from the name Laskas (Λάσκας) or Laskos (Λάσκος) and the -aris (-άρις) ending borrowed from the Latin -arius, but the Greek linguist K. Menas considered such an etymological evolution as unlikely. The Greek historian D. Theodoridis instead suggested a derivation from the Arabic al-ʿashqar, "ruddy, blond", or also "sorrel". According to the Oxford Dictionary of Byzantium, the "most probable" etymology is the one proposed by B. Hemmerdinger in 1969, according to which the name derives from the Persian word Lashkarī (لشگری, also Arabic: عسکری, ʿaskarī), meaning "warrior, soldier". However, this interpretation is open to question since "the first known members of the Laskaris family [...] were simple peasants".

== Early history ==
=== Family and ascension ===
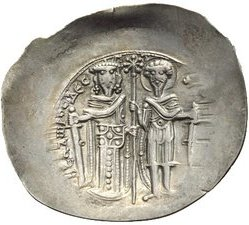
Aspron of Theodore I Laskaris (r. 1205–1221), first emperor of Nicaea and founder of the dynasty.

The first occurrence of the name is in 1059, in a will by Eustathios Boilas, but the people mentioned there were simple peasants. In 1180, a Michael Laskaris appears to have had significant influence in Thessalonica, while another Michael Laskaris, perhaps his descendant, is mentioned in 1246 conspiring in Thessalonica against Demetrios Angelos Doukas. The relation of these individuals to the imperial dynasty, if any, is unclear.

The first Laskaris of note were the brothers Theodore and Constantine, members of an obscure aristocratic family with ties to the imperial Komnenos clan. Their dynasty made a late appearance on the Byzantine political scene. The names of their parents or any other 12th century member of their family are not recorded. If Theodore followed the Byzantine custom of giving his father's name to his firstborn son, his father was called Nicholas. Their mother belonged to an unidentified branch of the Komnenos family and they proudly adopted her surname. They had no less than five brothers; Manuel, Michael, George, Alexios, and Isaac. George Pachymeres calls Manuel and Michael 'Tzamantouros', possibly a surname indicating that they were born to a different mother, or alternatively a nickname. The family was connected to western Asia Minor and Constantinople. Both Theodore and Constantine had a seal representing Saint George and bearing the inscription 'Diasorites'. The seal expressed their connection to the monastery of Saint George Diasorites, located in Pyrgion in the valley of the river Kaistros. Theodore rose to prominence in Constantinople through his familial ties with the Komnenoi. After Theodore's marriage to Anna Komnene Angelina, daughter of emperor Alexios III Angelos, in 1200, the 'Komnenos Laskaris' family became connected to the ruling Angelos dynasty. Theodore soon acquired the title of despot and was elevated to the first position of the imperial line of succession.

=== Fourth Crusade ===
Upon the sack of Constantinople on April 1204, the emperor Alexios V Doukas fled the city seeking refuge to Alexios III Angelos, but the latter blinded him and he was eventually taken captive by the Latins. According to Niketas Choniates, as the Crusaders captured Constantinople on April 12, an emergency assembly was gathered in Hagia Sophia with the aim to declare the new Byzantine emperor between Constantine Laskaris and Constantine Doukas. The former was elected emperor by the people, but declined the imperial insignia and instead urged resistance against the crusaders. Given Constantine's apparent subordinate role under Theodore in 1205, some historians such as Sir Steven Runciman and Donald Queller, held that it could have been Theodore, instead of Constantine, who was nominated as emperor and succeeded Alexios V on the day of the sack. According to other accounts, Theodore had left before the fall of the city, right after he escaped from prison sometime before September 1203; he then moved to Asia Minor with a small group of trusted soldiers and his close family. Whatever the case, Constantine had no option but to quickly flee the capital and on the following day of the sack he sailed to the Asian side of the Bosporus strait. Constantinople fell to the Crusaders and an ill-fated Latin Empire was erected. On May 1204, Count Baldwuin IX of Flanders was officially crowned emperor at the church of Hagia Sophia. Meanwhile, in Asia Minor the Latin rule found resistance by local Greek magnates trying to transform their estates into autonomous units. The most determined of them was proven to be Theodore, Constantine's brother, whose resistance movement succeeded in establishing a new principality in exile.

== Empire of Nicaea ==
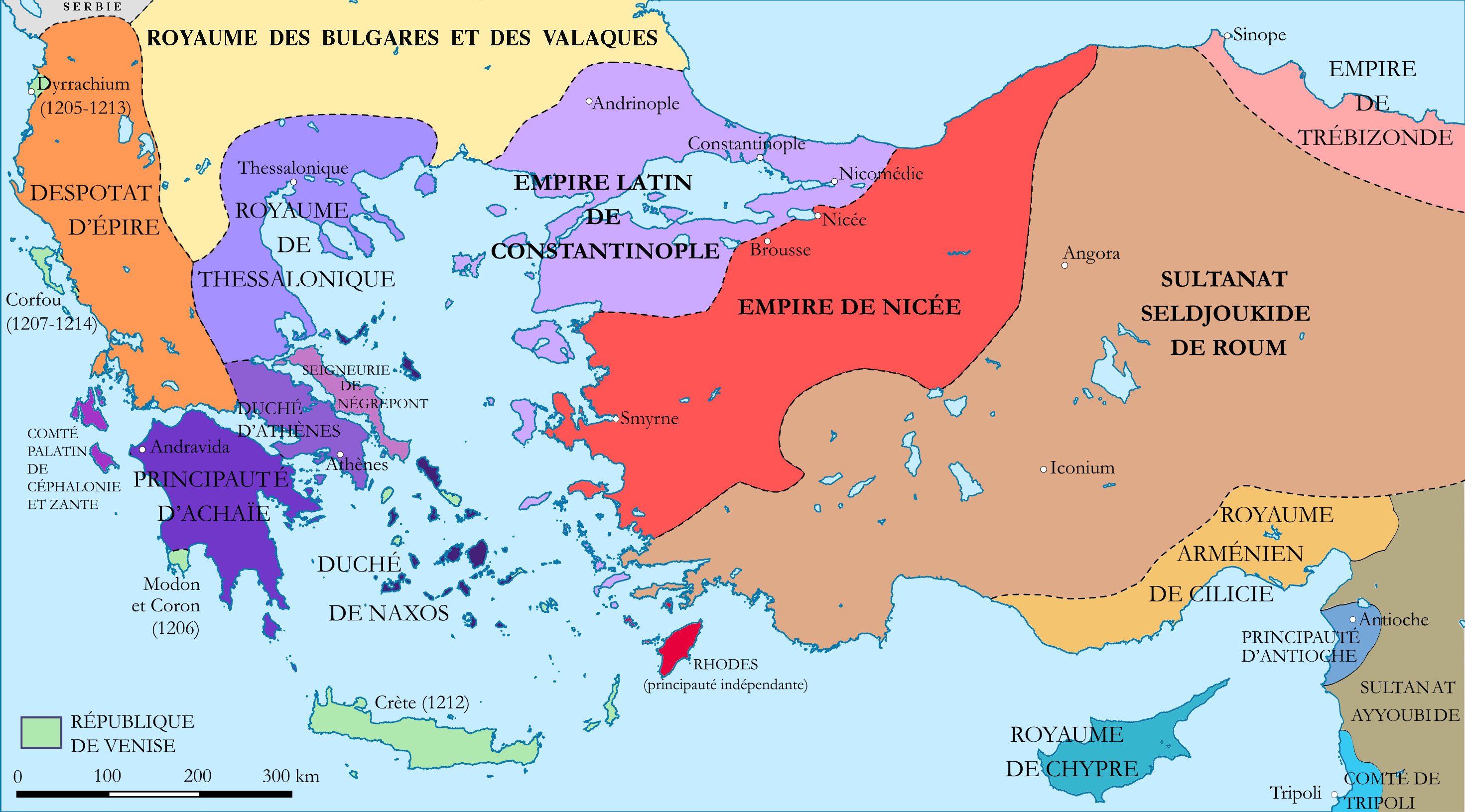
Empire of Nicaea shown in red; one of the three Byzantine successor states, along with Epirus and Trebizond.

In the years after the fall of the Byzantine capital in 1204, Theodore managed to drive out the Latins from the territory he occupied in western Anatolia and create a duplicate of the former Byzantine state. Initially a local lord (acknowledged as strategos "military leader" in Bithynia), he ascended to power by allying with politically powerful refugees and local elites who helped him in the reestablishment of the imperial government. His brother Constantine aided him in his military campaigns, as well as his diplomatic relations. In the Empire of Nicaea the idea of Greek unification and restoration of the Byzantine rule was soon formed and strengthened. As Theodore's state begun to consolidate its rule in northwest Anatolia, more Greeks begun to settle in his realm from the European territories that were now under Latin rule. As a result, the Byzantine successor states largely consisted of a homogenous Greek population. In 1205 Theodore assumed the title of emperor (basileus), but he was officially crowned by the new patriarch in 1208. The coronation took place in the city of Nicaea, an event that turned the city into the center of the empire, as well as of the Orthodox Church. Theodore had to defend his empire not only against the Crusaders but also against David Komnenos, a rival Greek emperor in Trebizond to the east on the Black Sea. During his reign Laskaris undertook the task of expanding the borders of his empire, facing the forces of the Latins and the Seljuks on several occasions, while at the same time he laid the foundations of the internal administration of the newly formed state. Soon the goal of the empire's foreign policy became the recapture of Constantinople, an act that would indisputably legitimize the new state as the rightful successor of the old Empire.

Theodore I, whose sons, Nikolaos and John both died before 1213, was succeeded in 1221 by his son-in-law, John III Doukas Vatatzes, who had married Theodore's daughter Irene Laskarina. Vatatzes had to fight off a rival claim by Theodore's brothers, Isaac and Alexios, who fled to the Latin Empire and sought aid in order to depose him. Nevertheless, Vatatzes' victory at Poemanenum in 1224 was decisive; it strengthened his own position and heralded a long and successful Nicaean offensive against the Latin holdings. Throughout his reign, Vataztes' main rivals were the Bulgarian tsar Ivan Asen II and the Latin rulers of Constantinople to the west, as well as the Sultanate of Rum to the east. The Greek lords of Epirus and Trebizond, including Theodore Komnenos Doukas, were also his adversaries for the Byzantine throne. In a series of successful military campaigns, Vatatzes expanded the Nicaean borders to encompass parts of Macedonia and Thrace. His expansion into the Balkan peninsula culminated in 1246 with the capture of Thessalonica, which was until then controlled by the Komnenodoukas dynasty of Epirus. Vatatzes had previously compelled the dynasty to abandon the imperial title (basileus), allowing them to maintain only the title of 'despot'. Under the reign of Vatatzes, the Greeks regained nearly the whole of western Anatolia from the Turks, while the Latin empire was significantly reduced to Constantinople and its surroundings. Through a series of military victories, successful diplomacy, and beneficial policies, Vatatzes managed to significantly strengthen his empire, while also gaining popularity among the Byzantines, which resulted in his canonization as a saint by the Orthodox Church.

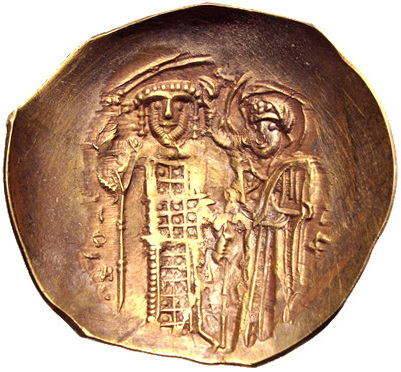
Hyperpyron of Theodore II Lascaris (r. 1254–1258)

Vatatzes died in 1254 leaving his only son Theodore II Laskaris on the throne. Though his reign was short-lived compared to his predecessors, Theodore II was proven to be an able ruler and a man of letters. He envisioned to rule as a Platonic philosopher king and wrote several works on theology, rhetoric, and politics. Under the Laskarids, Nicaea became the center of Hellenic education and acquired the nickname "the new Athens". During his four year reign Theodore II initiated a series of reforms aimed at curtailing the role of the aristocratic families in the internal affairs of the state. Theodore dismissed high officials of aristocratic origin and favoured local lineages of low birth. He was aware of the significance of the imperial office, and he personally administered the state. Theodore ruled until his death in 1258 leaving his eight year old son John IV Laskaris as the legal heir to the imperial throne. A few days before his death, Theodore appointed the Laskarid loyalist George Mouzalon and Patriarch Arsenios as John's guardians and regents. Mouzalon's lowly origins were viewed with discontent by the Byzantine aristocracy, who was reminded of the Laskarid policy that aimed to regulate their power. As a result, the aristocratic faction around Michael Palaiologos orchestrated a coup d'état that took control from Mouzalon and installed Palaiologos as regent of John in 1258 and eventually as co-emperor in 1259. In the same year, Michael was in charge of the army that defeated an anti-Nicaean coalition at the battle of Pelagonia, a victory that enabled him to recapture Constantinople in 1261. Following the reconquest of the city, Palaiologos was crowned alone as emperor, while John IV was ignored. Soon after, John was blinded, an act that triggered reactions in Asia Minor, where the imperial Laskaris family was particularly popular among the people. John likely lived under restraint until his death in c. 1305.

== Later history ==
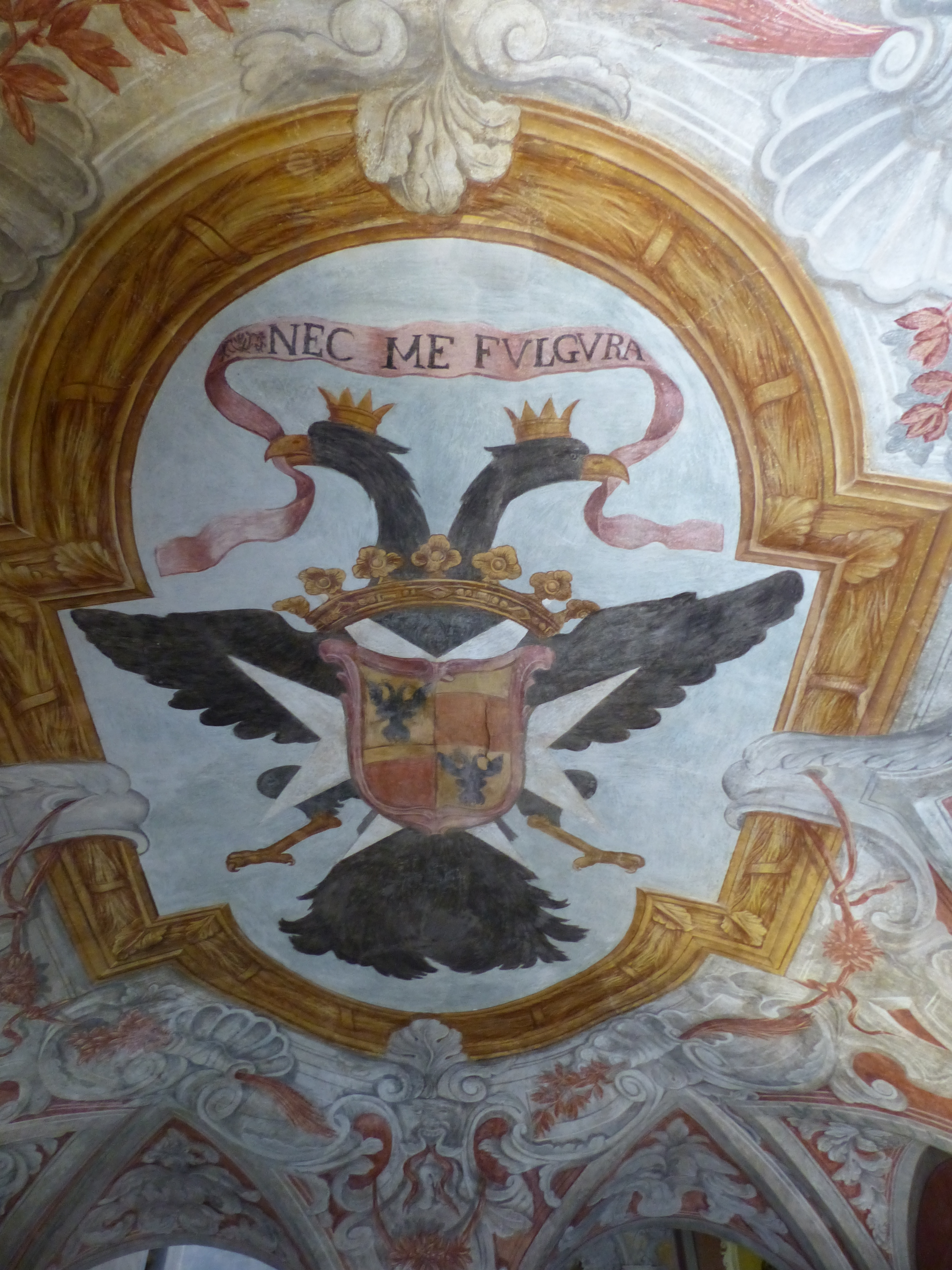
Arms of Lascaris di Ventimiglia at the Palais Lascaris, Nice, France

Under the new Palaiologos dynasty, the population of Asia Minor continued to react to the deposition of the Laskarids. Patriarch Arsenios excommunicated Michael VIII Palaiologos for the blinding of John IV—for which Arsenios was later deposed—while Laskarid supporters in Asia Minor backed the rebellion of Alexios Philanthropenos against Andronikos II Palaiologos in 1295. The followers of Arsenios, known as the Arsenites, did not reconcile with the Palaiologoi until 1310. In the 14th century, John IV was venerated as a saint in the monastery of saint Demetrios in Constantinople. Under the Palaiologoi, the Laskarids retained a certain prominence, although their role now evidently diminished. Several members of the Laskaris family became local governors, imperial courtiers, and wealthy landowners. Among the most notable members were Manuel Laskaris, domestic of the schools c. 1320, and Alexios, a megas hetaireiarches c. 1370. The scholars Constantine Lascaris and John Ryndakenos Laskaris were among the emigres who fled the fall of the Byzantine Empire to the Ottomans and found refuge in Italy. In the 15th century, Laskaris Kananos wrote an account of his travels in northern Europe.

In 1269 the daughter of Emperor Theodore II Laskaris, Eudossia Laskaris, married Gugliemo Pietro I Balbo, Count of Ventimiglia. In the past, Guglielmo had been imprisoned following his participation at the battle of Pelagonia against the Byzantines, but he managed to be released thanks to his close connections with the Geneose. From the union of Eudossia and Guglielmo came the dynasty of the Lascaris of Ventimiglia, who governed the sovereign County of Tenda until 1501 when the last of them, Anna Lascaris, married Renato of Savoy (French: René de Savoie) and transferred the County to his cadet branch of the Savoy dynasty. The most famous member of Ventimiglia branch of Lascaris was Giovanni Paolo Lascaris, Grand Master of the Knights of Malta. He constructed the Lascaris towers of Malta and attempted to create for Malta a Caribbean colonial empire.

== Emperors ==
Portrait	Name	Reign
	Theodore I Laskaris; Θεόδωρος Λάσκαρις	May 1205 – November 1221 (16 years and 6 months)
	John III Vatatzes; Ἰωάννης Βατάτζης	December 1221 – 3 November 1254 (32 years and 11 months)
	Theodore II Laskaris; Θεόδωρος Λάσκαρις	3 November 1254 – 16 August 1258 (3 years, 9 months and 13 days)
	John IV Laskaris; Ἰωάννης Λάσκαρις	16 August 1258 – 25 December 1261 (3 years, 4 months and 9 days)

== See also ==
- Family tree of the Byzantine emperors
- Giovanni Paolo Lascaris
- Palais Lascaris
- House of Ventimiglia
- Alexander M. Laskaris
- Byzantine literature of the Laskaris and Palaiologos periods

== Sources ==
- Angelov, Dimiter (2019). The Byzantine Hellene, The Life of Emperor Theodore Laskaris and Byzantium in the Thirteenth Century. Cambridge University Press. ISBN 9781108480710.
- Angelov, Dimiter (2021). "Laskaris family, Rulers of the empire of Nicaea (1204-1261)". In Speake, Graham (ed.). Encyclopedia of Greece and the Hellenic Tradition. Taylor & Francis. ISBN 9781135942137.
- Banev, Guentcho (2002a). "John III Vatatzes". Encyclopaedia of the Hellenic World, Asia Minor. Foundation of the Hellenic World.
- Banev, Guentcho (2002b). "Theodore II Lascaris". Encyclopaedia of the Hellenic World, Asia Minor. Foundation of the Hellenic World.
- Bartusis, Mark (2015). The Late Byzantine Army. Arms and Society, 1204-1453. University of Pennsylvania Press, Incorporated. ISBN 9781512821314.
- Bradford, Ernle (1990). The Great Betrayal: The Story of the Fourth Crusade. Dorset Press. ISBN 0880295988.
- Fine, John V. A. (1994) [1987]. The Late Medieval Balkans: A Critical Survey from the Late Twelfth Century to the Ottoman Conquest. Ann Arbor, Michigan: University of Michigan Press. ISBN 978-0-472-10079-8.
- Giarenis, Ilias (2006). "John IV Laskaris". Encyclopaedia of the Hellenic World, Asia Minor. Foundation of the Hellenic World.
- Hendrickx, Benjamin (2006). "Latin Empire of Constantinople". In Murray, Alan (ed.). The Crusades, An Encyclopedia. Vol. [4 Volumes]. Bloomsbury Publishing. ISBN 9781576078631.
- Kazhdan, Alexander, ed. (1991). The Oxford Dictionary of Byzantium. Oxford and New York: Oxford University Press. ISBN 0-19-504652-8.
- Korobeinikov, Dimitri (2014). Byzantium and the Turks in the Thirteenth Century. Oxford University Press. ISBN 9780191017940.
- Macrides, Ruth (2007). George Akropolites: The History, Introduction, Translation and Commentary. Oxford University Press. ISBN 9780191568718.
- Nicol, Donald (1992). Byzantium and Venice, A Study in Diplomatic and Cultural Relations. Cambridge University Press. ISBN 9780521428941.
- Ostrogorsky, George (1956). History of the Byzantine State. Oxford: Basil Blackwell.
- Puech, Vincent (2011). "The Aristocracy of the Empire of Nicaea". In Herrin, Judith; Guillaume, Saint-Guillain (eds.). Identities and Allegiances in the Eastern Mediterranean after 1204. Farnham: Ashgate Publishing. pp. 69–80. ISBN 9781409410980.
- Queller, Donald (1977). The Fourth Crusade: the conquest of Constantinople, 1201-1204. University of Pennsylvania Press. ISBN 0812277309.
- Theodoridis, Dimitri (2004). "Die Herkunft des byzantinischen Familiennamens Λάσκαρις". Revue des études byzantines. 62: 269–273. doi:10.3406/rebyz.2004.2298.
- Van Arsdall, Anne; Moody, Helen, eds. (2018). The Old French Chronicle of Morea, An Account of Frankish Greece After the Fourth Crusade. Taylor & Francis. ISBN 9781134797462.
- Vasiliev, Alexander (1964). History of the Byzantine Empire, 324–1453, Volume II. University of Wisconsin Press. ISBN 0299809269.
- Volkoff, Angelina Anne (2015). "Komnenian Double Surnames on Lead Seals: Problems of Methodology and Understanding". Dumbarton Oaks Papers. 69: 197–208. JSTOR 26497715.
- Vougiouklaki, Pinelopi (2003). "Theodore I Laskaris". Encyclopaedia of the Hellenic World, Asia Minor (in Greek). Foundation of the Hellenic World.
