= Nicholas Mesarites =

Byzantine churchman and writer

Nicholas Mesarites (Greek: Νικόλαος Μεσαρίτης; ca. 1163/4 – after 1216) was a Byzantine Greek churchman and writer, who eventually rose to the office of Metropolitan of Ephesus in the Empire of Nicaea.

== Life ==
Born ca. 1163/4, Mesarites is first recorded in 1200, during the attempted coup of John Komnenos the Fat. At the time, Mesarites was skeuophylax of the Church of the Pharos in the Great Palace of Constantinople, and wrote an eyewitness account of the events.

After the capture of Constantinople by the Fourth Crusade in 1204, he initially remained in the city. In late 1206, along with his brother John he participated in discussions between the Greek Orthodox clergy and the new Latin authorities, represented by the Latin Patriarch of Constantinople Thomas Morosini and the papal legate, Cardinal Benedict of Santa Susanna. The discussion failed to breach the rift between the two parties, as the Greeks refused to subordinate themselves to the Latin clergy. Following the death of his brother in February 1207, Mesarites left for the Empire of Nicaea, where he was appointed Metropolitan of Ephesus soon after.

As Metropolitan of Ephesus, he headed a mission in 1214/5 to Constantinople for discussions with the new papal envoy, Cardinal Pelagius of Albano. Mesarites wrote a report of his discussions with Pelagius, where he highlights his intransigence, intolerance towards the Greek Orthodox clergy and insistence on Papal primacy. In 1216 he officiated at the marriage of Irene Laskarina, the eldest daughter of the Nicaean emperor Theodore I Laskaris, and Andronikos Palaiologos.

== Writings ==
Mesarites' writing style, distinguished by "his interest in vivid details and in his own role in the events" (A. Kazhdan), marks a conscious departure from the conventions of Byzantine literature, which he on occasion mocks. This is particularly evident in his description of the 1200 coup, which is far more vivid and immediate than the far more stylized and abstract treatments of the same event by other contemporary writers. The epitaph he composed for his brother contains also an eyewitness account of the fall of Constantinople and contemporary events. Mesarites also left a valuable description of the Church of the Holy Apostles, and of the school that functioned in its premises.

=== Editions ===
- August Heisenberg, Nikolaos Mesarites. Die Palastrevolution des Johannes Komnenos, Würzburg, 1907.
- August Heisenberg, Der Epitaphios des Nikolaos Mesarites auf seinen Bruder Johannes, in Neue Quellen zur Geschichte des lateinischen Kaisertums und der Kirchenunion I, Sitzungsberichte der bayerischen Akademie der Wissenschaften, Munich, 1922.
- August Heisenberg, Die Unionsverhandlungen von 30. August 1206. Patriarchenwahl und Kaiserkrönung in Nikaia 1208, in Neue Quellen zur Geschichte des lateinischen Kaisertums und der Kirchenunion II, Munich, 1923.
- August Heisenberg, Der Bericht des Nikolaos Mesarites über die politischen und kirchlichen Ereignisse des Jahres 1214, in Neue Quellen zur Geschichte des lateinischen Kaisertums und der Kirchenunion III, Munich, 1923.
- Glanville Downey, Nikolaos Mesarites. Description of the Church of the Holy Apostles at Constantinople, Philadelphia, American Philosophical Society, 1957.

== Sources ==
- Harris, Jonathan (2003). Byzantium and the Crusades. London and New York: Hambledon and London. ISBN 1-85285-298-4.
- Kazhdan, Alexander; Epstein, Ann Wharton (1985). Change in Byzantine Culture in the Eleventh and Twelfth Centuries. Berkeley and Los Angeles: University of California Press. ISBN 0-520-05129-7.
- Kazhdan, Alexander (1991). "Mesarites, Nicholas". In Kazhdan, Alexander (ed.). The Oxford Dictionary of Byzantium. Oxford and New York: Oxford University Press. p. 1346. ISBN 0-19-504652-8.
- Macrides, Ruth (2007). George Akropolites: The History – Introduction, Translation and Commentary. Oxford: Oxford University Press. ISBN 978-0-19-921067-1.
