= Lascaris =

Lascaris or Laskaris (Greek: Λάσκαρης) is a Greek surname first documented in the eleventh century. The Byzantine feminine form is Laskarina or Laskara.

It is the surname of:

- House of Laskaris, Byzantine imperial dynasty.
  - Theodore I Laskaris (c. 1175–1221), emperor.
  - Isaac Laskaris, brother of Theodore I, sebastokrator.
    - Nicholas Laskaris (died 1210), son of Theodore I and co-emperor.
    - Maria Laskarina (1206–1270), daughter of Theodore I, queen of Hungary.
    - Irene Laskarina (c. 1194-9 – 1240), daugher of Theodore I and was Empress consort of Nicaea.
      - Theodore II Laskaris (c. 1222–1258), son of Irene, emperor.
      - Eudoxia Laskarina or Irene Laskaris (c. 1245–1311), daughter of Theodore II.
        - Lascaris di Ventimiglia, also known as Lascaris de Vintimille, Lascaris-Ventimiglia, or Ventimiglia-Lascaris, the branch of the Ventimiglia family descended from Eudoxia.
          - Vataça Lascaris di Ventimiglia, (c. 1272– 1336) daughter of Eudoxia, Italian princess and Portuguese aristocrat.
          - Anne Lascaris (1487–1554), 8th-generation descendant of Eudoxia, French aristocrat.
          - Giovanni Paolo Lascaris (1560–1657), 10th-generation descendant of Eudoxia, Italian nobleman and Grand Master of the Knights of Malta.
  - John IV Laskaris (1250–c. 1305), emperor.
  - Pseudo-John IV Laskaris (fl. 1262), imperial pretender.
  - Michael Laskaris (fl. 1254–1272), aristocrat and military commander.
- John Laskaris (composer) (fl. 15th century), Byzantine music theorist and composer.
- Janus Lascaris, also called John Rhyndacenus (c. 1445–1535), Greek scholar in the Renaissance.
- Constantine Lascaris (1434–1501), Greek scholar in the Renaissance.
- Eugenio Láscaris, born Eugenio Lascorz y Labastida, Spanish lawyer and imperial pretender as Eugene II Lascaris Comnenus.
- Teodoro Láscaris or Teodoro Láscaris-Comneno (1921–2006), Spanish professor of philosophy and imperial pretender as Theodore IX Lascaris Comnenus.
- Christos Laskaris (1931–2008), Greek poet.
- Zoe Laskari (1942–2017) Greek actress.
- Dimitri Lascaris (1963–) Canadian lawyer, journalist, political activist.
- Alexander M. Laskaris (born 1967), American diplomat.
- Pavlos Laskaris (born 1996), Greek professional footballer.

== Etymology ==
The name likely comes from the Persian lashkarī 'warrior'.

== Buildings ==
- Palais Lascaris A seventeenth-century aristocratic building in Nice, France

== See also ==
- Lascaris War Rooms, military complex in Malta
- Demetrios Laskaris Leontares (died 1431), Byzantine statesman and military leader
- Laskaris Kananos, 15th-century Greek traveler
- John Laskaris Kalopheros (1325/30–1392), Byzantine aristocrat
- Alexios Laskaris Philanthropenos (fl. 1429–1449), Byzantine official and governor of the Morea
- John Doukas Angelos Palaiologos Raoul Laskaris Tornikes Philanthropenos Asen (c. 1400), Byzantine noble child
