= Andronikos Palaiologos (son-in-law of Theodore I) =

Andronikos Palaiologos (Greek: Ἀνδρόνικος Παλαιολόγος; died c. 1216) was the son-in-law and heir-apparent of Theodore I Laskaris, Emperor of Nicaea, in the 1210s.

== Life ==
Andronikos is a very obscure figure. As R. Macrides writes, "almost everything that is known about him [...] has been disputed: his identity/name, the date of his marriage, the date of his death, the cause of his death". Nothing is known of his origin and early life, and even his name is uncertain, as the metropolitan of Ephesus, Nicholas Mesarites, who officiated at his marriage, calls him "Constantine Doukas Palaiologos" in a sermon of his. All Byzantine chroniclers on the other hand, beginning with George Akropolites who is the main source on his life, call him Andronikos, and it is usually supposed that the different name in Mesarites' account is a transcription error by a later copyist.

Andronikos is first mentioned by Akropolites as participating in the 1211 campaign against the Latin Empire, which ended with the Nicaean defeat at the Battle of the Rhyndacus. During the course of the campaign, the Latin Emperor Henry of Flanders also took the cities of Lentiana and Poimanenon. Andronikos was evidently one of the main commanders during the siege of Lentiana, and was captured but later released by the Latins. Due to the chronological order of Akropolites' narrative, the marriage of Andronikos with Irene Laskarina, the eldest daughter of the Nicaean emperor Theodore I, was earlier regarded as contemporary with the 1211 events, but is now placed in February 1216. After his marriage Andronikos was elevated to the supreme rank of despot and became Theodore's heir-apparent, since the latter had no sons. He died soon after, however, from an unidentified "sexual condition" according to Akropolites, and Irene was remarried to John Doukas Vatatzes, who eventually succeeded Theodore I as emperor.

== Sources ==
- Cheynet, Jean-Claude; Vannier, Jean-François (1986). Études Prosopographiques (in French). Paris: Publications de la Sorbonne. ISBN 978-2-85944-110-4.
- Macrides, Ruth (2007). George Akropolites: The History – Introduction, Translation and Commentary. Oxford: Oxford University Press. ISBN 978-0-19-921067-1.
