= Isaac Laskaris =

Member of Byzantine imperial family

Isaac Laskaris (Greek: Ισαάκιος Λάσκαρις) was a brother of Nicaean emperor Theodore I Laskaris, who along with his brother Alexios Laskaris fled to the Latin Empire and unsuccessfully tried to topple Theodore's successor, John III Doukas Vatatzes, in 1224.

== Life ==
Isaac was one of at least six brothers of Theodore I Laskaris, and had been honoured by the latter with the title of sebastokrator, a title habitually bestowed on brothers of the emperor. When Theodore I died in November 1221, he had no male heirs, and was succeeded by the husband of his eldest daughter, John III Vatatzes. This development displeased Theodore's brothers, and Isaac, together with his brother Alexios, also a sebastokrator, fled to the Latin Empire, taking along with them Theodore's daughter Eudokia, Shortly before his death, Theodore had tried to arrange a marriage between Eudokia and the Latin Emperor, Robert of Courtenay, and the brothers evidently hoped to use her to secure Latin assistance against Vatatzes. In the end, the marriage did not come to pass. Two other brothers, Michael and Manuel, also sought exile during John III's reign, perhaps in connection with the defection of Alexios and Isaac, but later returned to Nicaea and were active in the reign of John III's son, Theodore II Laskaris.

Robert did, however, provide refuge and an appropriate place in his court to the two brothers, with whom he was related through the marriage of his sister Maria to Theodore Laskaris. Furthermore, one of the two brothers had already had considerable contact with the Latin court, having spent time at Constantinople as a prisoner ca. 1220–21. This act soured relations between Nicaea and the Latins, and in 1224 the two brothers Alexios and Isaac found themselves at the head of the Latin army sent to confront Vatatzes. In the resulting Battle of Poimanenon in 1224, however, Vatatzes secured a decisive success: in a hard-fought battle, the Latin army was defeated, the brothers were captured, and Vatatzes proceeded to reduce most of the fortresses the Latins held in northwestern Asia Minor. After his victory, Alexios and Isaac were blinded.

== Sources ==
- Macrides, Ruth (2007). George Akropolites: The History - Introduction, translation and commentary. Oxford University Press. ISBN 978-0-19-921067-1.
- Van Tricht, Filip (2011). The Latin Renovatio of Byzantium: The Empire of Constantinople (1204–1228). Leiden: Brill. ISBN 978-90-04-20323-5.
