= John III Doukas Vatatzes =

Emperor of Nicaea from 1221 to 1254

- Emperor and Autocrat of the Romans
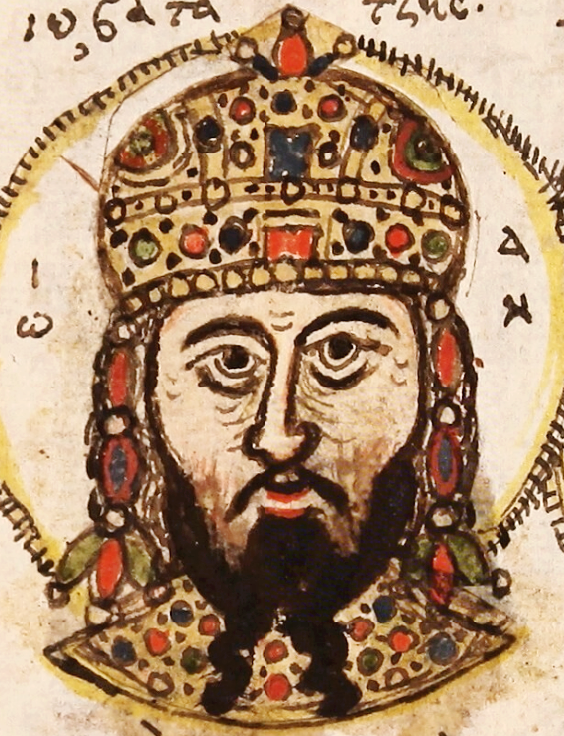
- 15th-century portrait of John III (from a 15th-century codex containing a copy of the Extracts of History by Joannes Zonaras)

Emperor of Nicaea Claimant Byzantine Emperor
- Reign: December 1221 – 3 November 1254
- Predecessor: Theodore I Komnenos Laskaris
- Successor: Theodore II Doukas Laskaris
- Born: c. 1192; Didymoteicho, Byzantine Empire
- Died: 3 November 1254 (aged 62); Nymphaion, Byzantine Empire
- Burial: Monastery of Sosandra, region of Magnesia
- Spouses: Irene Laskarina; Anna of Hohenstaufen
- Issue: Theodore II Doukas Laskaris
Names
- John Doukas Vatatzes; Ἰωάννης Δούκας Βατάτζης
- House: Vatatzes
- Father: Basil Vatatzes (?)
- Mother: ... Angelina (?)
- Religion: Eastern Orthodox

John III Doukas Vatatzes, Latinized as Ducas Vatatzes (Greek: Ἰωάννης Γ´ Δούκας Βατάτζης, romanized: Iōánnēs Doúkās Vatatzēs; c. 1192 – 3 November 1254), was Emperor of Nicaea from 1221 to 1254. He was succeeded by his son, known as Theodore II Doukas Laskaris.

== Life ==
John Doukas Vatatzes, born c. 1192 in Didymoteicho, was probably the son of the general Basil Vatatzes, who was killed in battle in 1194, and his wife, a cousin of the Emperors Isaac II Angelos and Alexios III Angelos. John Doukas Vatatzes had two older brothers. The eldest was Isaac Doukas Vatatzes (1188–1261), while his younger brother died at a young age. Through his marriage to Eudokia Angelina he fathered Theodora Doukaina Vatatzaina, who later married Michael VIII Palaiologos. The middle brother's name is unknown, but his daughter married the protovestiarios Alexios Raoul.

A successful soldier from a military family, John had risen to the position of protovestiarites when he was chosen c. 1216 by Emperor Theodore I Komnenos Laskaris as the second husband for his daughter Irene Laskarina, following the death of her first husband, Andronikos Palaiologos. As husband of Laskaris' firstborn, who had no son of his own, John may have been the de facto heir to the throne, though the question of succession was left open; Laskaris may have hoped his own marriage to Maria of Courtenay in 1219 would produce a male heir. As a result, when John III became emperor in December 1221, (Note: Jean Darrouzès dated the coronation of John III to c. 15 December. However, as Dimiter Angelov points out, "the logic of his calculations is questionable". George Akropolites notes that he was still "completing his thirty-third year" at the time of his death, which is corroborated by another source that gives him a reign of 32 years and 11 months. Another chronicle states that he reigned 18 years and 3½ months from 1221 to 1 March 1239 (actually 1240). This should give mid-November 1221, but Darrouzès dates it to "around 15 December".) following Theodore I's death in November, he had to suppress opposition to his rule by Laskaris' brothers, Alexios and Isaac. The struggle ended with the Battle of Poimanenon in 1224, in which his opponents were defeated in spite of support from the Latin Empire of Constantinople. John III's victory led to territorial concessions by the Latin Empire in 1225, followed by John's incursion into Europe, where he seized Adrianople.

John III's possession of Adrianople was terminated by Theodore Komnenos Doukas of Epirus and Thessalonica, who drove the Nicaean garrison out of Adrianople and annexed much of Thrace in 1227. The elimination of Theodore by Ivan Asen II of Bulgaria in 1230 put an end to the danger posed by Epirus, and John III made an alliance with Bulgaria against the Latin Empire.

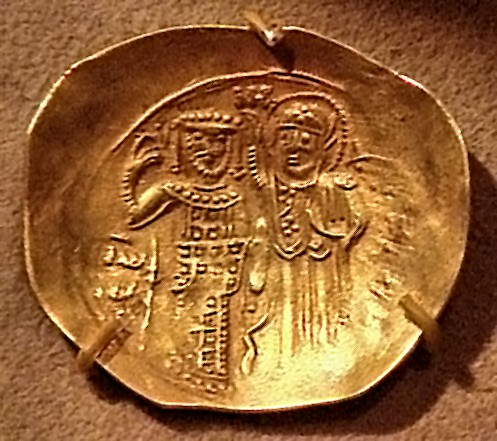
Gold hyperpyron of John III Vatatzes

In 1235 this alliance resulted in the restoration of the Bulgarian patriarchate and the marriage between Elena of Bulgaria and Theodore II, respectively Ivan Asen II's daughter and John III's son. In that same year, the Bulgarians and Nicaeans campaigned against the Latin Empire, and in 1236 they attempted a joint siege of Constantinople. Subsequently, Ivan Asen II adopted an ambivalent policy, effectively becoming neutral and leaving John III to his own devices.

John III Vatatzes was greatly interested in the collection and copying of manuscripts, and William of Rubruck reports that he owned a copy of the missing books from Ovid's Fasti. Rubruck was critical of the Hellenic traditions he encountered in the Empire of Nicaea, specifically the feast day for Saint Felicity favored by John Vatatzes, which Friedrich Risch suggests would have been the Felicitanalia, practiced by Sulla to venerate Felicitas in the 1st century with an emphasis on inverting social norms, extolling truth and beauty, reciting profane and satirical verse and wearing ornamented "cenatoria", or dinner robes during the day.

In spite of some reverses against the Latin Empire in 1240, John III was able to take advantage of Ivan Asen II's death in 1241 to impose his own suzerainty over Thessalonica (in 1242), and later to annex this city, as well as much of Bulgarian Thrace in 1246. By 1247 he had established an effective stranglehold on Constantinople. In the last years of his reign Nicaean authority extended far to the west, where John III attempted to contain the expansion of Epirus. Michael's allies Golem of Kruja and Theodore Petraliphas defected to John III in 1252. John III died in Nymphaion in 1254, and was buried in the monastery of Sosandra, which he had founded, in the region of Magnesia.

== Alliance with Frederick II ==
Frederick II's domains as Holy Roman Emperor and King of Sicily

In an attempt to save the ailing Latin empire after the joint Nicaean-Bulgarian siege of Constantinople in 1236, Pope Gregory IX called for a crusade against Nicaea and wrote to John III in 1237 informing him of the impending crusader army. In the face of Bulgarian neutrality, John III sought allies elsewhere, turning to the Holy Roman Emperor Frederick II von Hohenstaufen. Frederick II was the most powerful in Europe and had become the hated enemy of the papacy, having already been excommunicated by Gregory IX in 1227. In a letter composed sometime before his second excommunication in 1239, Frederick II wrote to John III lamenting the power of the pope in the west and praising John III for the power of the Byzantine emperor over the clergy.

Warm relations between the two Roman empires had already begun after the Sixth Crusade (1228–1229), undertaken by Frederick II to lift his first excommunication, when Frederick II received a Nicaean embassy bringing gold coins, gold-embroidered silk and horses, among other gifts. By 1238, the two emperors had concluded an alliance. Frederick II agreed to recognize John III as the legitimate Byzantine emperor, albeit with the title "Emperor of the Greeks" (Grecorum imperator / Γραικῶν βασιλεύς), in exchange for mutual aid. That same year, John III sent Nicaean troops to participate in the Siege of Brescia and Frederick II forestalled Gregory IX's crusade headed by the Latin emperor Baldwin II in north Italy, forcing the crusaders to eventually take the overland route to Constantinople in 1239.

In early 1240, John III's wife Irene Lascarina died, and later that year John III married Frederick II's 10-year-old daughter Constance II of Hohenstaufen to cement their alliance, who took the Greek name Anna. Despite the lack of children from the marriage and John III's affair with his wife's lady-in-waiting, the alliance between the two emperors continued until Frederick II's death in 1250.

After Gregory IX's death in 1241, the new pope Innocent IV continued the policies of his predecessor, and attempted to wage war on both emperors. At the Council of Lyon in 1245, Frederick was declared deposed as emperor and excommunicated, for, among a multitude of other reasons, marrying his daughter to John III who was called by Innocent IV "that enemy of God and the church." The illegal papal deposition of Frederick II was widely regarded as illegitimate and no European monarch offered support for Innocent’s anti-Staufen crusade. Frederick remained the preeminent monarch in the west. In the east, the pope called for another crusade against John III and entered into negotiations with the Mongols to invade Nicaea, but both efforts were unsuccessful. In the west, Innocent IV was more successful against Frederick II, and a papal-supported rebellion defeated the imperial army at the Battle of Parma in 1248. However, this and other setbacks notwithstanding, the situation remained fluid and Frederick managed to maintain his dominance in Italy. John III continued to send troops, including archers and infantryman, and subsidies to Frederick via Epirus between 1247 and 1250 to aid his father-in-law, who finally checked papal forces in central Italy at the Battle of Cingoli in August 1250 and avenged his reversals in Lombardy. His anti-imperial crusade seemingly crumbling, Innocent’s position in Lyon was dire. During 1250, Frederick had mostly recovered from his recent setbacks and enjoyed relative imperial ascendancy across Italy; however, the great Hohenstaufen emperor died of dysentery in December of that year.

After Frederick II's death, diplomatic activity briefly continued between the two empires, with John III's son Theodore II Doukas Laskaris delivering a memorial speech in which he admired Frederick II's struggle against the hostility of the western aristocracy and clergy. Frederick's son and successor Conrad IV sent an embassy to Nicaea in 1253 in order to return Constance-Anna's exiled family back to Italy, but Conrad IV and John III's deaths in 1254 ensured that a possible continuation of the imperial alliance never ensued; after Conrad's IV death, the Holy Roman Empire and the Kingdom of Sicily were divided. Frederick's other son Manfred, the last Hohenstaufen king of Sicily, was to prove hostile to the Nicaean cause, invading Nicaea's Albanian coast in 1257 and allying with Michael II Komnenos Doukas against Nicaea in 1259, providing troops for the Battle of Pelagonia. After the Nicaean victory, Michael VIII Palaiologos attempted to marry the widowed Constance-Anna, who had remained at the Nicaean court during the reigns of her stepson and stepgrandson, in order to secure an alliance with Manfred. However, Constance-Anna refused and moved to her brother's court in Sicily in 1261, thus severing all ties with Byzantium and formally ending the alliance started by John III and Frederick II.

== Family ==
John III Doukas Vatatzes married first Irene Lascarina, the daughter of his predecessor Theodore I Komnenos Laskaris in 1212. They had one son, the future Theodore II Doukas Laskaris. Irene fell from a horse and was so badly injured that she was unable to have any more children.

Irene retired to a convent, taking the monastic name Eugenia, and died there in summer of 1240.John III married as his second wife Constance II of Hohenstaufen, an illegitimate daughter of Emperor Frederick II by his mistress Bianca Lancia. They had no children.

== Legacy ==
Saint John Vatatzes the Merciful, Emperor of the Romans
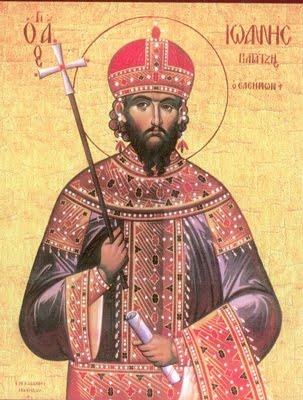
- St. John Vatatzes the Merciful King, Emperor of Nicaea and "the Father of the Greeks"

Emperor
- Venerated in: Eastern Orthodox Church
- Major shrine: Didymoteicho, Western Thrace and Nymphaion (Ionia) modern-day Kemalpaşa, Turkey
- Feast: 4 November
- Attributes: Imperial Vestment

John III Doukas Vatatzes was a successful ruler who laid the groundwork for Nicaea's recovery of Constantinople. He was successful in maintaining generally peaceful relations with his most powerful neighbors, Bulgaria and the Sultanate of Rum, and his network of diplomatic relations extended to the Holy Roman Empire and the Papacy. Among the armed forces he used were the large Cuman communities he had settled to guard Western Anatolia against invasions by Oghuz-Turkmens.

John III effected Nicaean expansion into Europe, where by the end of his reign he had annexed his former rival Thessalonica and had expanded at the expense of Bulgaria and Epirus. He also expanded Nicaean control over much of the Aegean and annexed the important island of Rhodes, while he supported initiatives to free Crete from Venetian occupation aiming toward its re-unification with the Byzantine empire of Nicaea. Styling himself the true inheritor of the Roman Empire, John III encouraged justice and charity, and provided active leadership in both peace and war despite his epilepsy. He carefully developed the internal prosperity and commerce of his realm, which became known for bountiful harvest festivals reportedly drawing on traditions from the Felicitas feast days described in the missing 11th book of Ovid's Book of Days.

A half-century after his death, John III was canonized as a saint, under the name John Vatatzes the Merciful (Note: Not to be confused with John the Merciful) and is commemorated annually on 4 November. George Akropolites mentions that the people saw to the construction of a temple in his honour in Nymphaeum, and that his cult as a saint quickly spread to the people of western Asia Minor. On the same day, since 2010, the Vatatzeia festival is organized at Didymoteicho by the local metropolitan bishop. Alice Gardiner remarked on the persistence of John's cult among the Ionian Greeks as late as the early 20th century, and on the contrast she witnessed where "the clergy and people of Magnesia and the neighbourhood revere his memory every fourth of November. But those who ramble and play about his ruined palace seldom connect it even with his name."

His feast day is formally an Eastern Orthodox holiday, although it is not commemorated with any special liturgy; there are two known historical akolouthiai for him, including an 1874 copy of an older Magnesian menaion for the month of November, which shows that in the 15th and 16th century, he was venerated as "the holy glorious equal of the Apostles and emperor John Vatatzes, the new almsgiver in Magnesia." The relevant hymns are preserved in only one known manuscript in the library of the Leimonos monastery on Lesbos, Greece, and include references to the feast day for the almsgiver John Vatatzes. John III Vatatzes' feast day has largely fallen out of favor other than in the church dedicated to him in his birth city of Didymoteicho.

The generations after John Vatatzes looked back upon him as "the Father of the Greeks." (Note: "Apostolos Vacalopoulos notes that John III Ducas Vatatzes was prepared to use the words 'nation' (genos), 'Hellene' and 'Hellas' together in his correspondence with the Pope. John acknowledged that he was Greek, although bearing the title Emperor of the Romans: "the Greeks are the only heirs and successors of Constantine", he wrote. In similar fashion John’s son Theodore II, acc. 1254, who took some interest in the physical heritage of Antiquity, was prepared to refer to his whole Euro-Asian realm as "Hellas" and a "Hellenic dominion". (What Vacalopoulos does not examine is whether, like the Latins, they also called their Aegean world 'Roman-ia').") It is also the case that many in the religious and academic community consider John Vatatzes to be the best candidate for the identity of the "Marble Emperor" in direct contrast with those who claim that Constantine XI is in fact the legendary reposed king.

== Sources ==
=== Primary ===
- Macrides, R. J., ed. (2007). George Akropolites: The History: Introduction, translation and commentary. OUP Oxford. ISBN 978-0-19-921067-1.

=== Secondary ===
- Agelarakis, P. A. (2012). "Cretans in Byzantine foreign policy and military affairs following the Fourth Crusade". Cretika Chronika. 32: 41–78.
- Angelov, Dimiter (2019). The Byzantine Hellene: The Life of Emperor Theodore Laskaris and Byzantium in the Thirteenth Century. Cambridge University Press. ISBN 978-1-108-48071-0.
- Borgolte, Michael; Schneidmüller, Bernd, eds. (2010). Hybride Kulturen im mittelalterlichen Europa/Hybride Cultures in Medieval Europe. Akademie Verlag. ISBN 9783050049663.
- Brownworth, Lars (2010). Lost to the West: the Forgotten Byzantine Empire That Rescued Western Civilization. Broadway Books. ISBN 9780307407962.
- Carr, John (30 April 2015). Fighting Emperors of Byzantium. Pen and Sword. ISBN 978-1473856400.
- Ciolfi, Lorenzo M. (2017). "From Byzantium to the Web: The Endurance of John III Doukas Vatatzes' Legacy". Revue des études sud-est européennes. 55: 59–71.
- Ciolfi, Lorenzo M. (2014). "John III Vatazes, Byzantine imperial saint?" (PDF). Bulletin of British Byzantine Studies.
- Darrouzès, Jean (1978). "Peter Schreiner, Die byzantinischen Kleinchroniken. II". Revue des études byzantines (in French). 36: 276–277.
- de Montor, Artaud (1911). The Lives and Times of the Popes: Sergius IV. Catholic Publication Society of America.
- Fine, John V. A. (1994) [1987]. The Late Medieval Balkans: A Critical Survey from the Late Twelfth Century to the Ottoman Conquest. Ann Arbor, Michigan: University of Michigan Press. ISBN 978-0-472-10079-8.
- Ellis, Steven G.; Klusáková, Lud'a (2007). Imagining Frontiers, Contesting Identities. Edizioni Plus. ISBN 978-88-8492-466-7.
- Gardiner, Alice (1912). The Lascarids of Nicaea: The Story of an Empire in Exile. Amsterdam: Methuen.
- Herrin, Judith; Saint-Guillain, Guillaume (2011). Identities and Allegiances in the Eastern Mediterranean After 1204. Ashgate Publishing. ISBN 1409410986.
- Munitiz, Joseph A. (1988). Nikephoros Blemmydes: A Partial Account. Spicilegium Sacrum Lovaniense. ISBN 978-9042928114.
- Murata, Koji; Ichikawa, Kohei; Fujii, Yuri I.; Hayakawa, Hisashi; Cheng, Yongchao; Kawamoto, Yukiko; Sano, Hidetoshi (2021). "Cometary records revise Eastern Mediterranean chronology around 1240 CE". Publications of the Astronomical Society of Japan. 73 (1): 197–204. arXiv:2012.00976. doi:10.1093/pasj/psaa114.
- O'Rourke, Michael (2010). Byzantium From Recovery to Ruin, A Detailed Chronology: AD 1220–1331 (Thesis). Canberra, Australia.
- Ostrogorsky, George (1969). History of the Byzantine State. New Brunswick: Rutgers University Press. ISBN 9780813511986.
- Polemis, Demetrios (1983). "Remains of an acoluthia for the emperor John Ducas Vatatzes". In Mango, C.; Pritsak, O. (eds.). Okeanos. Essays Presented to Ihor Sevcenko on His Sixtieth Birthday by His Colleagues and Students. Ukrainian Research Institute, Harvard University.
- Polemis, Demetrios I. (1968). The Doukai: A Contribution to Byzantine Prosopography. London: The Athlone Press.
- Risch, Friedrich, ed. (1930). Geschichte der Mongolen und Reisebericht, 1245–1247. Leipzig: E. Pfeiffer.
- Treadgold, Warren (1997). A History of the Byzantine State and Society. Stanford, California: Stanford University Press. ISBN 0-8047-2630-2.
- Varzos, Konstantinos (1984). Η Γενεαλογία των Κομνηνών [The Genealogy of the Komnenoi] (PDF) (in Greek). Vol. B. Thessaloniki: Centre for Byzantine Studies, University of Thessaloniki.
- Vasiliev, Alexander (1964). History of the Byzantine Empire, 324–1453. Vol. II. University of Wisconsin Press.
- Wood, Christopher S. (2008). Wood, Forgery, Replica, Fiction: Temporalities of German Renaissance Art. University of Chicago Press. ISBN 9780226905976.
- Yalvar, Cihan (2022). "Anadolu'da son Türk İskâni: İznik imparatorluğu'nda Kuman-Kipçaklar ve Yalova Kazimiye (Yortan) ile Elmalik (Saruhanli) Köylerindeki varliklari" [The last Turkish settlement in Anatolia: The Cuman-Kipchaks in the Iznik Empire and their presence in the villages of Yalova Kazimiye (Yortan) and Elmalik (Saruhanli)]. Türk Dünyası Araştırmaları. 127 (250): 11–36.

John III Doukas Vatatzes Laskarid dynasty Born: unknown 1192 Died: 3 November 1254
Regnal titles
Preceded by Theodore I Komnenos Laskaris	Emperor of Nicaea; 1221–1254	Succeeded by Theodore II Doukas Laskaris
