= Anna of Hohenstaufen =

Empress of Nicaea, from 1244 to 1254

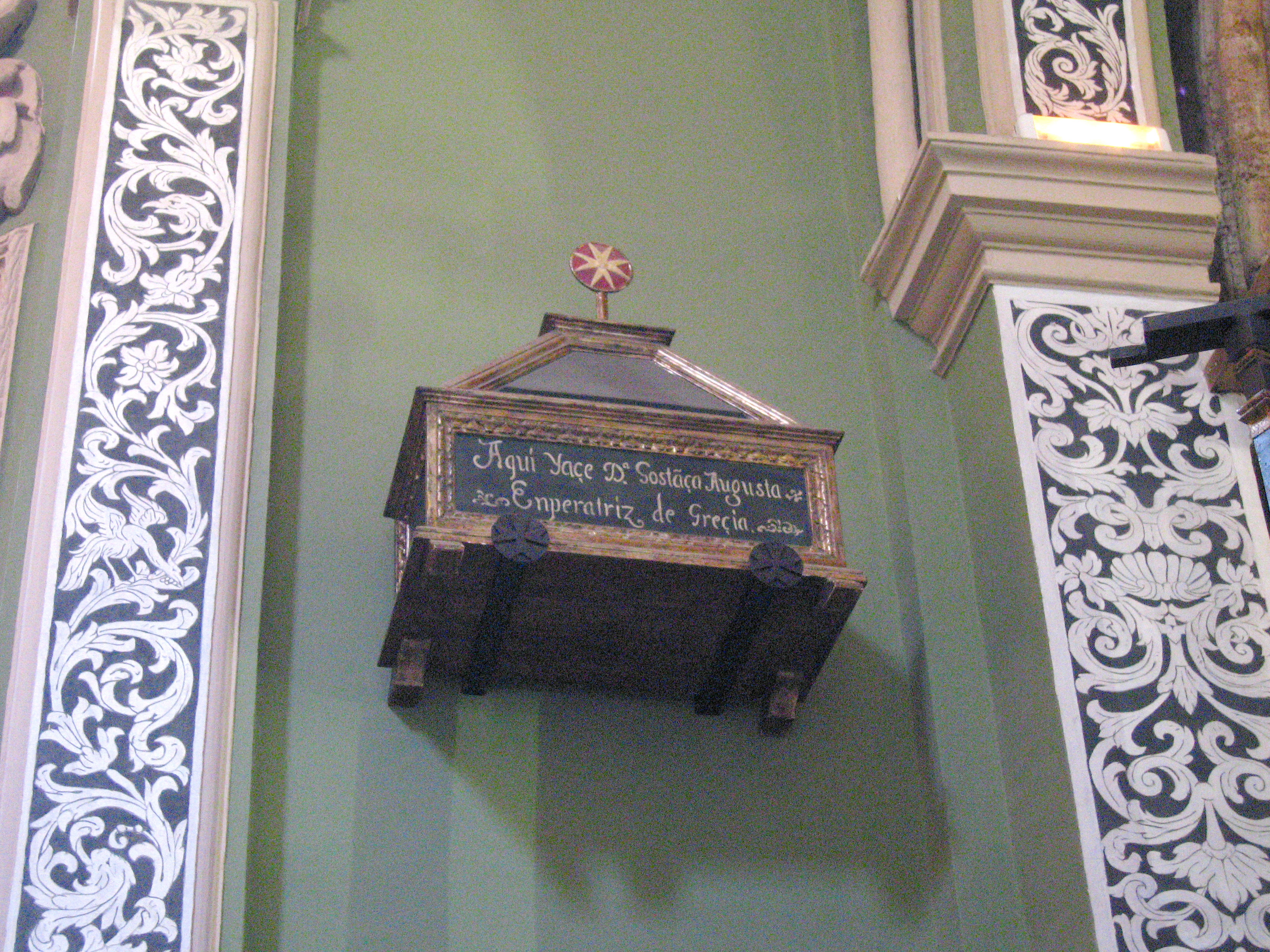
- Sepulchre of Constance in the Church San Juan del Hospital (Valencia). The inscription translates as Here lies Lady Constance Augusta, Empress of Greece

Empress consort of Nicaea
- Tenure: 1244–1254
- Born: 1230
- Died: April 1307 (age 76–77)
- Spouse: John III Doukas Vatatzes
- Father: Frederick II, Holy Roman Emperor
- Mother: Bianca Lancia

Anna of Hohenstaufen (1230 – April 1307), born Constance, was an Empress of Nicaea. She was a daughter of Frederick II, Holy Roman Emperor and Bianca Lancia.

== Empress ==
She married Nicaean Emperor John III Doukas Vatatzes as part of an alliance between her father and her husband. Some historians regard the alliance as a result of their common hostility to the papacy. The marriage occurred in 1244; it is recorded by the chronicles of both George Acropolites and George Pachymeres. Constance took the name Anna following her marriage. Constance was only 14, and was accompanied to Nicaea by a governess, the Marchesa della Fricca. According to George Acropolites the governess became the mistress of John III and "rival in love" of Anna.

In time the Marchesa came to have considerable influence at court. Nicephorus Blemmydes called her "rival empress". However Blemmydes' negative criticism resulted in an attempt at his life by her followers. Blemmydes survived, and Marchesa lost the favor of John III, who dismissed her from court. Blemmydes' account was later included in his autobiography.

== Widow ==
Constance remained empress until the death of her husband on 3 November 1254. Her stepson Theodore II Laskaris succeeded to the throne. By that time Frederick II had also died. Pachymeres records her staying in Nicaea through the reigns of both Theodore II (1254–1258) and her step-grandson John IV Laskaris (1259–1261). Alice Gardner suggested that she was still politically useful as a hostage against the remaining members of the House of Hohenstaufen, particularly her brother Manfred of Sicily.

John IV was underage through his brief reign. His regent and co-ruler was Michael VIII Palaiologos, who maneuvered John IV aside. After the Nicaeans regained Constantinople and re-established the Byzantine Empire, Michael deposed John IV and later blinded him. According to Pachymeres, around this time Michael fell in love with Anna and attempted to marry her, but the widowed Empress rejected him. Deno Geanakoplos points out "what militates against Pachymeres' statement, however, is the question why Michael, merely for love of Anna, would be willing to risk almost certain excommunication by the Patriarch Arsenios without the gaining of an important political benefit." Michael's aim was to gain an alliance with Manfred, but with Anna's refusal, the anger of his own wife, and threat of ecclesiastical censure by Arsenios, Michael dropped the proposal. She was given magnificent presents and allowed to leave the new court for the Kingdom of Sicily in 1263. This gesture secured the release of Michael's general Alexios Strategopoulos, who had been captured by the Despot of Epirus, Michael II Komnenos Doukas.

Again known as Constance, she joined the court of Manfred. When he was killed at the Battle of Benevento (1266) and was succeeded by his victorious enemy Charles of Anjou, Constance fled Sicily for Aragon, where her niece, Manfred's daughter Constance, was the consort of Crown Prince Peter. She remained for some time at the court of King James I of Aragon, but eventually retired as a nun to a monastery in Valencia, where she died.

== Notes ==
Anna of Hohenstaufen House of Hohenstaufen Born: 1230 Died: 1307
Royal titles
Preceded by Irene Lascarina	Empress consort of Nicaea c. 1244–1254	Succeeded by Elena of Bulgaria
