= Battle of Poimanenon =

AD 1224 battle between the Latin Empire and the Nicaean Empire

- Part of the Nicaean-Latin Wars
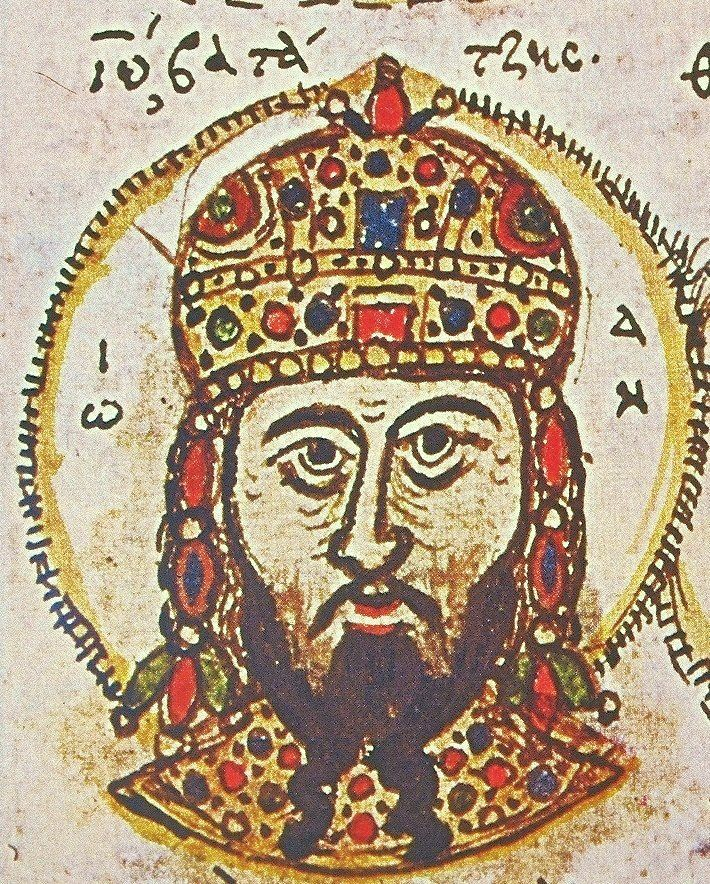
- John III Doukas Vatatzes, Emperor of Nicaea (1222–1254)
Date	1223/1224
Location	Poimanenon
Result	Nicaean victory

Belligerents
Empire of Nicaea	Latin Empire

Commanders and leaders
John III	Robert I, Latin Emperor; Alexios Laskaris (POW); Isaac Laskaris (POW)

The Battle of Poimanenon or Poemanenum was fought in early 1224 (or possibly late 1223) between the forces of the two main successor states of the Byzantine Empire; the Latin Empire and the Byzantine Greek Empire of Nicaea. The opposing forces met at Poimanenon, south of Cyzicus in Mysia, near Lake Kuş.

== Background and battle ==
Since the Treaty of Nymphaeum in 1214, the Latin Empire had controlled the northwestern littoral of Asia Minor, from Nicomedia to Adramyttium, as well as the Mysian plain. In November 1221, the energetic founder of the Nicaean Empire, Theodore I Laskaris, died, and was succeeded by his son-in-law, John III Doukas Vatatzes, who had emerged as the victor out of the civil strife that had commenced since the death of Theodore I Laskaris. The succession was disputed by Theodore's brothers, the sebastokratores Alexios Laskaris and Isaac Laskaris, who rose up in revolt and requested the aid of the Latin emperor, Robert of Courtenay. At the head of a Latin army, they marched against Vatatzes. The two armies met at Poimanenon, near a church dedicated to the Archangel Michael. In the ensuing battle, Vatatzes achieved a decisive victory; among the captives taken were the two Laskaris brothers, who were blinded. The 13th-century Byzantine historian George Akropolites says that Emperor John, "... won a victory by storm". His narration describes the Nicaean army as being almost defeated, before the Emperor, with a few men, turned the tide, "For he took hold of a spear and struck the enemy".

== Aftermath ==
Summing up the importance of this battle, George Akropolites wrote that "Since then (this battle), the state of the Italians [the Latin Empire] ... began to decline".

The news about the defeat at Poimanenon caused panic in the Latin imperial army besieging Serres from the Despotate of Epirus, which withdrew in chaos in the direction of Constantinople and was therefore defeated decisively by the troops of the Epirote ruler, Theodore Komnenos Doukas. This victory opened up the way for the recovery of most of the Latin possessions in Asia. Threatened both by Nicaea in Asia and Epirus in Europe, the Latin emperor sued for peace, which was concluded in 1225. According to its terms, the Latins abandoned all their Asian possessions except for the eastern shore of the Bosporus and the city of Nicomedia with the surrounding region.

== Sources ==
- Abulafia, David, ed. (1999). The New Cambridge Medieval History, Volume 5, c.1198–c.1300. Cambridge: Cambridge University Press. ISBN 978-1-13905573-4.
- Macrides, Ruth (2007). George Akropolites: The History - Introduction, translation and commentary. Oxford University Press. pp. 165–169. ISBN 978-0-19-921067-1.
- Rakova, Snezhana (2002). "Battle of Poimanenon, 1224". Encyclopaedia of the Hellenic World, Asia Minor. Foundation of the Hellenic World. Archived from the original on 3 March 2016.
- Setton, Kenneth M. (1976). The Papacy and the Levant (1204–1571), Volume I: The Thirteenth and Fourteenth Centuries. Vol. 1. Philadelphia: The American Philosophical Society. p. 52. ISBN 0-87169-114-0.
- Van Tricht, Filip (2011). The Latin Renovatio of Byzantium: The Empire of Constantinople (1204–1228). Leiden: Brill. ISBN 978-90-04-20323-5.
