= Empire of Nicaea =

Byzantine rump state (1204–1261)

Empire of Nicaea Βασιλεία Ῥωμαίων Ἑλλάς (Greek)
- 1204–1261
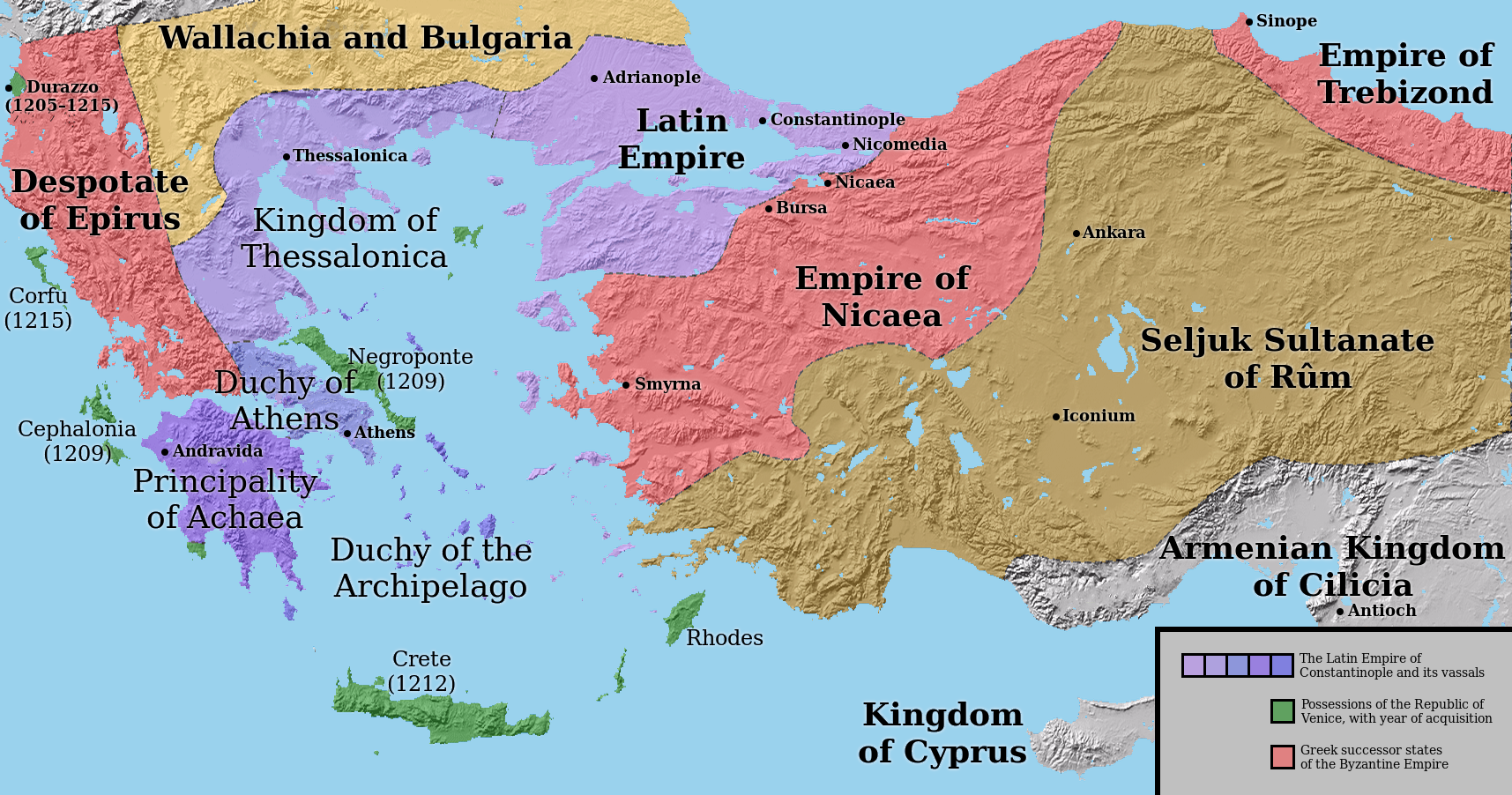
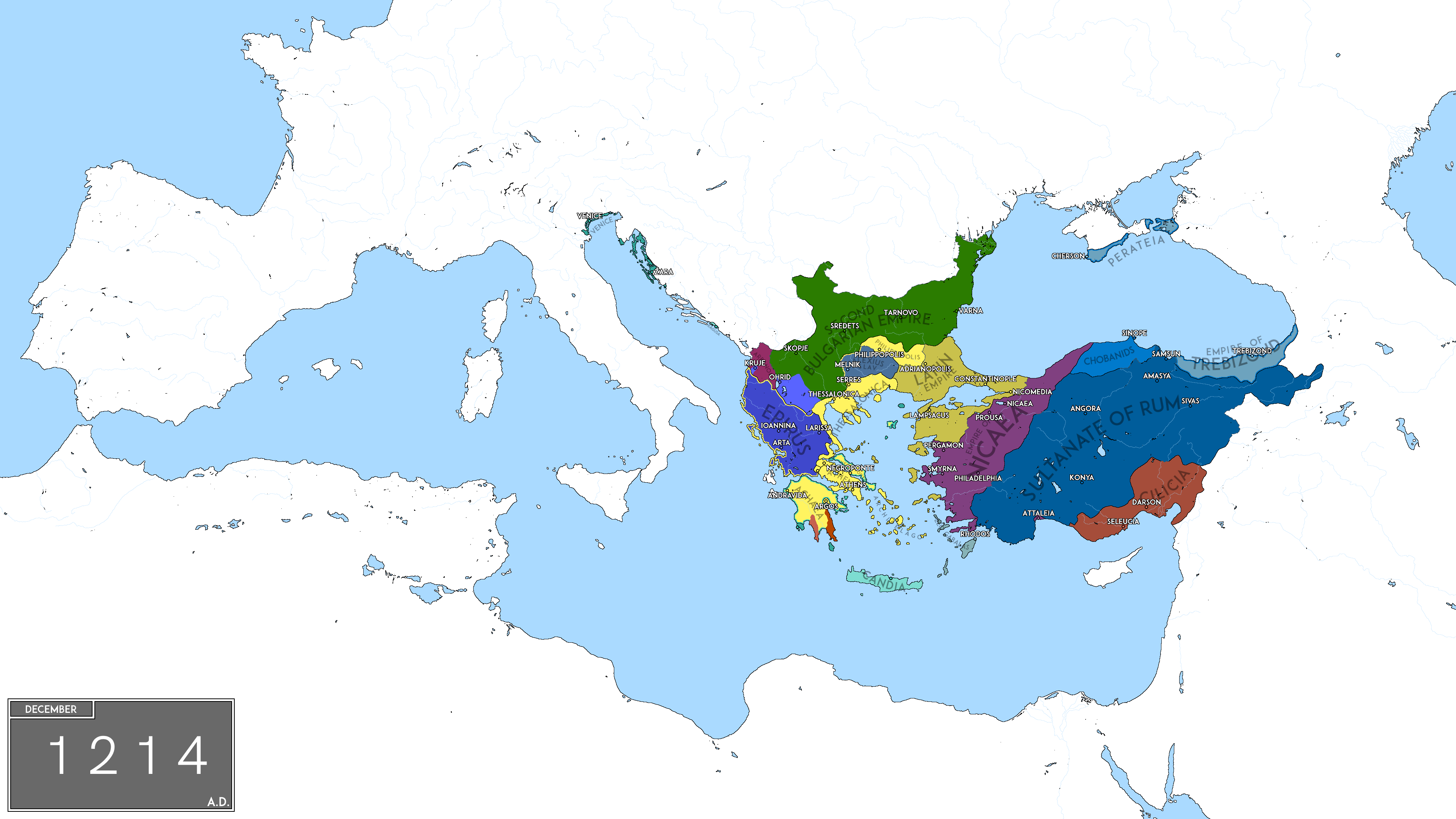
- Status: Rump and Successor state of the Byzantine Empire
- Capital: Nicaea (İznik) (de jure); Nymphaion (Kemalpaşa) (de facto)
- Common languages: Byzantine Greek
- Religion: Greek Orthodoxy (official)
- Demonyms: Romaios, Hellene
- Government: Monarchy
- Emperor
  - 1204–1222: Theodore I Laskaris
  - 1222–1254: John III Doukas Vatatzes
  - 1254–1258: Theodore II Laskaris
  - 1258–1261: John IV Laskaris
  - 1259–1261: Michael VIII Palaiologos
- Historical era: High Middle Ages
  - Established: 1204
  - Disestablished: July 1261
Preceded by	Succeeded by
Byzantine Empire under the Angelos dynasty; Empire of Thessalonica	Byzantine Empire under the Palaiologos dynasty

The Empire of Nicaea (Greek: Βασιλεία Ῥωμαίων), also known as the Nicene Empire, was the largest of the three Greek rump states founded by the aristocracy of the Byzantine Empire that fled when Constantinople was occupied by Western European and Venetian armed forces during the Fourth Crusade, a military event known as the Sack of Constantinople. Like the other Byzantine rump states that formed due to the 1204 fracturing of the empire, such as the Empire of Trebizond and the Despotate of Epirus, it was a continuation of the eastern half of the Roman Empire that survived well into the Middle Ages. A fourth state, known in historiography as the Latin Empire, was established by an army of Crusaders and the Republic of Venice after the capture of Constantinople and the surrounding environs.

The Empire of Nicaea was established by the Laskaris noble family in the Byzantine holdings of northwestern Anatolia, and lasted from 1204 to 1261, when it recaptured Constantinople and restored the empire. Thus, the Nicene Empire is seen as a direct continuation of the Byzantine Empire, as it fully assumed the traditional titles and government of the Byzantines in 1205, and recaptured the original capital in 1261. The Despotate of Epirus (1204-1479) initially contested this claim, especially after the capture of Thessalonica in 1224, but the Despotate was forced to renounce its claim in 1242. The Empire of Trebizond (1204-1461), which had declared its independence a few weeks before the Sack of Constantinople in 1204, withdrew its claim in the Treaty of 1282.

== History ==
=== Foundation ===
In 1204, Byzantine emperor Alexios V Doukas Mourtzouphlos fled Constantinople after crusaders invaded the city. Soon after, Theodore I Laskaris, the son-in-law of Emperor Alexios III Angelos, was proclaimed emperor, but he too, realizing the situation in Constantinople was hopeless, fled to the city of Nicaea in Bithynia.

The Latin Empire, established by the Crusaders in Constantinople, had poor control over former Byzantine territory, and Greek successor states of the Byzantine Empire sprang up in Epirus, Trebizond, and Nicaea. Trebizond had broken away as an independent state a few weeks before the fall of Constantinople. Nicaea, however, was the closest to the Latin Empire and was in the best position to attempt to re-establish the Byzantine Empire.

Theodore Laskaris was not immediately successful, as Henry of Flanders defeated him at Poimanenon and Prusa (now Bursa) in 1204. But Theodore was able to capture much of northwestern Anatolia after the Bulgarian defeat of Latin Emperor Baldwin I in the Battle of Adrianople, because Henry was recalled to Europe to defend against invasions from Tsar Kaloyan of Bulgaria. Theodore also defeated an army from Trebizond, as well as other minor rivals, leaving him in charge of the most powerful of the successor states.

Numerous truces and alliances were formed and broken over the next few years, as the Byzantine successor states, the Latin Empire, the Bulgarian Empire and the Seljuks of Iconium (whose territory also bordered Nicaea) fought each other. In 1211, at Antioch on the Meander, Theodore defeated a major invasion by the Seljuks, who were backing a bid by Alexios III Angelos to return to power. The losses suffered at Antioch, however, led to a defeat at the hands of the Latin Empire at the Rhyndacus River and the loss of most of Mysia and the Marmara Sea coast in the subsequent Treaty of Nymphaeum. The Nicenes were compensated for this territorial loss when, in 1212, the death of David Komnenos allowed their annexation of his lands in Paphlagonia.

In 1205, Theodore assumed the traditional titles of the Byzantine emperors. Three years later, he convoked a church council to elect a new Orthodox patriarch of Constantinople. The new patriarch crowned Theodore emperor and established his seat at Theodore's capital, Nicaea. In 1219, he married the daughter of Latin Empress Yolanda of Flanders, but he died in 1221 and was succeeded by his son-in-law, John III Doukas Vatatzes.

=== Expansion ===
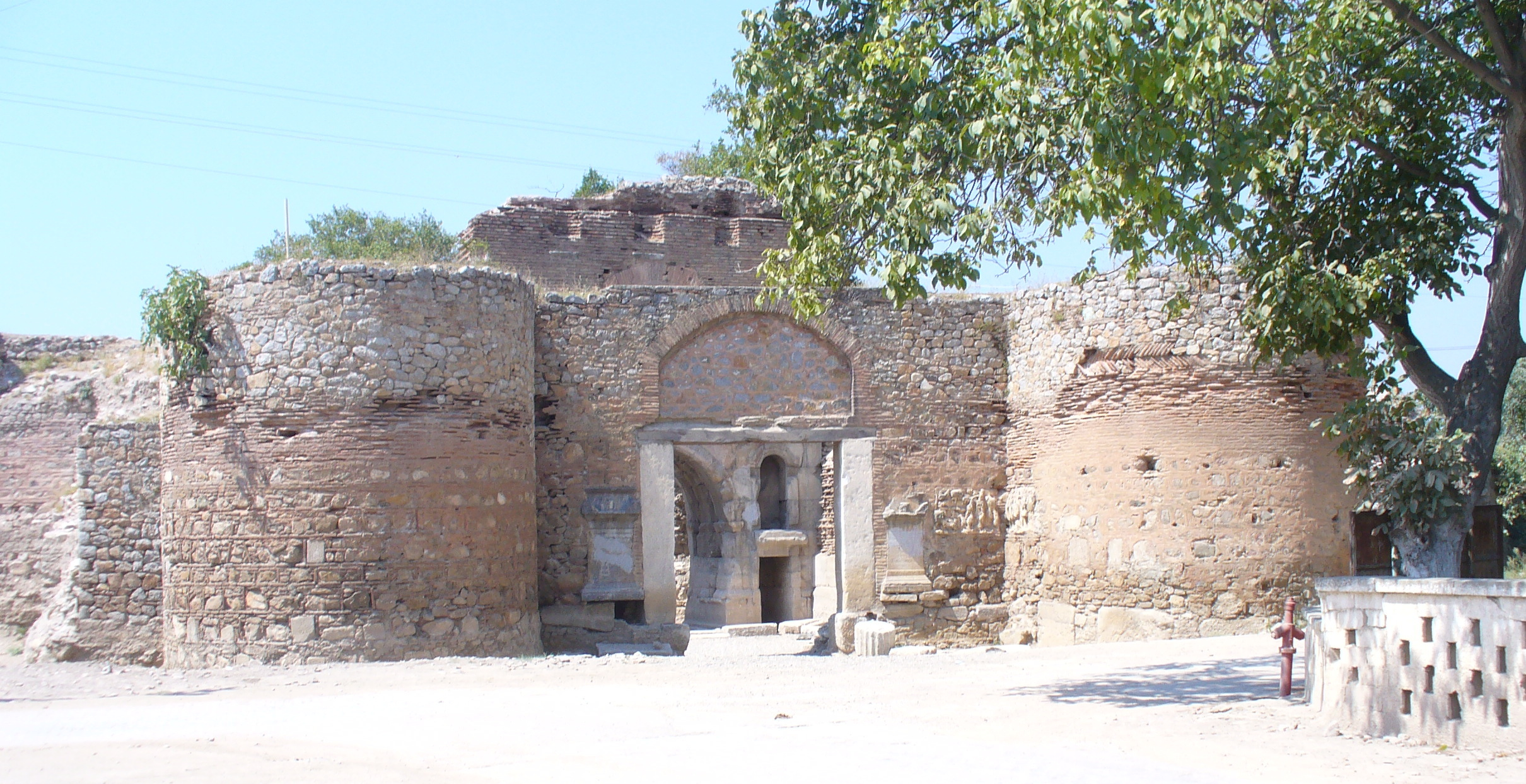
Nicaea city wall, Lefke gate; Iznik, Turkey

The accession of Vatatzes was initially challenged by the Laskarids, with the sebastokratores Isaac and Alexios, brothers of Theodore I, seeking the aid of the Latin Empire. Vatatzes prevailed over their combined forces, however, in the Battle of Poimanenon, securing his throne and regaining almost all of the Asian territories held by the Latin Empire in the process.

In 1224, the Latin Kingdom of Thessalonica was captured by the Despot of Epirus Theodore Komnenos Doukas, who crowned himself emperor in rivalry to Vatatzes and established the Empire of Thessalonica. It proved short-lived, as it came under Bulgarian control after the Battle of Klokotnitsa in 1230. With Trebizond lacking any real power, Nicaea was the only effective Byzantine state left, and John III expanded his territory across the Aegean Sea. In 1235, he allied with Ivan Asen II of Bulgaria, allowing him to extend his influence over Thessalonica and Epirus.

In 1242, the Mongols invaded Seljuk territory to the east of Nicaea, and although John III was worried they might attack him next, they ended up eliminating the Seljuk threat to Nicaea. In 1245, John allied with the Holy Roman Empire by marrying Constance II of Hohenstaufen, daughter of Frederick II. In 1246, John attacked Bulgaria and recovered most of Thrace and Macedonia, and proceeded to incorporate Thessalonica into his realm. By 1248, John had defeated the Bulgarians and surrounded the Latin Empire. He continued to take land from the Latins until his death in 1254.

Theodore II Laskaris, John III's son, faced invasions from the Bulgarians in Thrace, but successfully defended the territory. A conflict between Nicaea and Epirus broke out in 1257. Epirus allied with Manfred of Sicily when Theodore II died in 1258. John IV Laskaris succeeded him, but since he was still a child he was put under the regency of the general Michael Palaiologos. Michael proclaimed himself co-emperor (as Michael VIII) in 1259, and soon defeated a combined invasion by Manfred, the Despot of Epirus, and the Latin Prince of Achaea at the Battle of Pelagonia.

=== Recapture of Constantinople ===
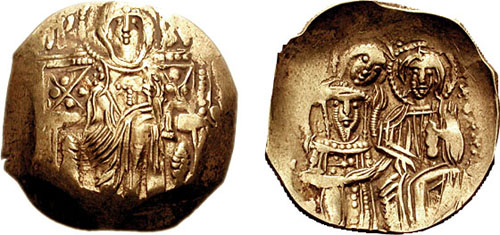
Coin issued by Michael VIII Palaiologos to celebrate the liberation of Constantinople from the Latin army, and the restoration of the Byzantine Empire.

In 1260, Michael began the assault on Constantinople itself, which his predecessors had been unable to do. He allied with Genoa, and his general Alexios Strategopoulos spent months observing Constantinople in order to plan his attack. In July 1261, as most of the Latin army was fighting elsewhere, Alexios was able to convince the guards to open the gates of the city. Once inside he burned the Venetian quarter (as Venice was an enemy of Genoa, and had been largely responsible for the capture of the city in 1204).

Michael was recognized as emperor a few weeks later, restoring the Byzantine Empire. Part of Achaea was soon recaptured, but Trebizond and Epirus remained independent Byzantine Greek states. The restored empire also faced a new threat from the Ottomans, when they arose to replace the Seljuks.

== Aftermath ==
After 1261, Constantinople once more became the capital of the Byzantine Empire. The territories of the former Empire of Nicaea were stripped of their wealth, which was used to rebuild Constantinople and to fund numerous wars in Europe against the Latin states and Epirus. Soldiers were transferred from Asia Minor to Europe, leaving the old frontier relatively undefended. Raids by Turkish ghazis were left unchecked, and the frontier was increasingly overrun.

The usurpation of the legitimate Laskarid ruler John IV Laskaris by Michael VIII Palaiologos in 1261 alienated much of the populace against the restored Byzantine Empire at Constantinople. John IV was left behind at Nicaea, and was later blinded on Michael's orders on his eleventh birthday, 25 December 1261. This made him ineligible for the throne, and he was exiled and imprisoned in a fortress in Bithynia. This action led to the excommunication of Michael VIII Palaiologos by the Patriarch Arsenios Autoreianos, and a later revolt led by a Pseudo-John IV near Nicaea.

The subsequent history of the former territory of the Empire of Nicaea is one of gradual conquest by the Turks. After the death of Michael VIII in 1282, Turkish raids turned into permanent settlement and the establishment of Turkish beyliks on former Byzantine territory. While the emperor Andronikos II attempted to improve the situation, it was unsuccessful. By c. 1300, nearly the whole of the former Empire of Nicaea had been conquered by the Turks, with only a tiny strip of territory directly opposite Constantinople clinging on. The final end of Byzantine Asia Minor came with the fall of Bursa in 1326, Nicaea in 1331 and Nicomedia in 1337.

== Military ==
The Nicene Empire consisted of Byzantium's most highly populated Greek region, with the exception of Thrace which was under Latin/Bulgar control. As such, the Empire was able to raise a reasonably numerous military force of around 20,000 soldiers at its height – numbers recorded as participating in its numerous wars against the Crusader states.

The Nicenes continued some aspects of the Komnenian army, but without the resources available to the Komnenian emperors the Nicene Byzantines could not match the numbers, nor the quality, of the armies that the emperor Manuel I Komnenos and his predecessors had fielded. Western Asia Minor had access to the sea, making it wealthier than most of the splinter states around and in time became the most powerful state in the region, if only for a short period.

== Ideology and Hellenism ==
The court of the Nicene state widely used the term "Hellenes" instead of the earlier "Romans" to describe its Greek speaking population. Contemporaries preferred the use of "Hellas" or the adjective "Hellenikon" for the Empire of Nicaea. As such, Emperor Theodore Laskaris sometimes replaced the terms Romaioi (Romans) and Graikoi by Hellenes. Emperor Theodore II describes his realm as the new Hellas. Patriarch Germanos II used in official correspondence with the western world the term: "Graikoi" to describe the local population and "Empire of the Greeks" (Greek: Βασιλεία των Γραικών) as the name of the state. During that time there was a concerted ethnic Greek self-identification initiative.

Some scholars see the Nicene empire period as an indication of rising ethnic Hellenic consciousness and Greek nationalism. However, these scholars caution that a rise in ethnic consciousness did not affect the official imperial ideology. In the official ideology, the traditional view of Byzantium as the Roman Empire was not overturned, as the usage of the word Rhomaioi for subjects of the Nicene emperors demonstrates. The official ideology of the Nicene Empire was one of reconquest and militarism, which was not to be seen in later 14th-century Palaiologan rhetoric.

The ideology of 13th-century Nicaea was characterized by belief in the continued significance of Constantinople and the hope to recapture the city, drawing less on claims of political universalism or Hellenic nationalism than on Old Testament ideas of Jewish providence. The emperor in this period is frequently compared to Moses or Zorobabel, or even as the "Pillar of Fire" that guides God's people to the Promised Land, e.g. in a speech delivered by Theodore I Laskaris, written by Niketas Choniates.

The rhetoric of this period also glorified war and the reconquest of Constantinople using images not drawn from the Old Testament. For example, in his panegyric of Theodore I Laskaris, Choniates describes a battle with a Seljuk sultan as a battle between Christianity and Islam, rhetorically comparing the wounds of Theodore, who had himself slain an enemy commander, to those of Christ on the cross. Dimiter Angelov suggests that western crusading ideology may have influenced the development of this view on reconquest, and during this period there is mention that Patriarch Michael IV Autoreianos offered full remission of sins to Nicene troops about to enter battle, a practice almost identical to a western plenary indulgence. However, the granting of such indulgences was short-lived, and many of the possible crusader influences seem to have dropped off after 1211.

The Byzantines of the 13th century also drew parallels between the situation of the empire after 1204 and that of Classical Greeks. This evidence has helped to strengthen the view of some scholars, such as A. E. Vacalopoulos, who see these references, combined with a re-evaluation of Byzantium's classical past, to be the genesis of Greek nationalism. With the loss of Constantinople, this comparison played on the idea of "Hellenes" surrounded by barbarians; Choniates equated the Seljuk sultan killed by Theodore I with Xerxes, and Patriarch Germanos II recalled the victory of John III Vatatzes as another battle of Marathon or Salamis. In much the same way, Theodore II Laskaris compared his father's victories to those of Alexander the Great and proceeded to extol the martial values of contemporary "Hellenes".

In addition, during this period there seems to have been a shift in how the word "Hellene" was used in Byzantine parlance. Up to this point, "Hellene" had borne a negative connotation and was in particular associated with the remnants of paganism. In this period, however, both the terms "Graikoi" and "Hellenes" appear to enter into the diplomatic usage of the empire as a form of religious and ethnic self-identification, spurred by a desire to differentiate the empire and its citizens from the Latins. Patriarch Germanos II in particular exemplifies this new vision of ethnic and religious identity. His letters equate good birth with the purity of his Hellenistic ancestry, placing more value in his Hellenistic linguistic and ethnic background than in any association with Constantinople, and showing his contempt for the Latins who prided themselves on possessing the city. There is a debate among scholars regarding the exact timing of the shift in meaning of the word Hellene. Roderick Beaton, considering the evidence of the usage of the term "Hellenes" in the 12th century, sees the re-evaluation of the term as occurring before the loss of Constantinople in 1204. In addition, unlike Vacalopoulos, Beaton sees not the birth of Greek nationalism, but rather an embryonic "ethnic" awareness, primarily based around language.

Michael Angold notes that the ideology of the period displays the ability of the Byzantines to react and adapt to changing cultural and political circumstances, including exile, and that the ideological developments of this period were, for the most part, cut short and discarded by the restored empire of the Palaiologoi, as Michael VIII returned to the ideology of earlier periods.

== Emperors ==
- Theodore I Laskaris (1204–1222)
- John III Doukas Vatatzes (1222–1254)
- Theodore II Laskaris (1254–1258)
- John IV Laskaris (1258–1261)
- Michael VIII Palaiologos (co-emperor 1259–1261; restored Byzantine Empire)

== See also ==
- Laskaris dynasty and related family tree
- Vatatzes dynasty and related family tree
- Family trees of the Byzantine imperial dynasties

== General and cited references ==
- Angold, Michael (1999). "Byzantium in exile". In Abulafia, David (ed.). The New Cambridge Medieval History, Volume 5, c.1198–c.1300. Cambridge: Cambridge University Press. pp. 543–568. ISBN 978-1-13905573-4.
- Geanakoplos, Deno John (1989). Constantinople and the West: Essays on the Late Byzantine (Palaeologan) and Italian Renaissances and the Byzantine and Roman Churches. University of Wisconsin Press. ISBN 978-0-299-11884-6.
