= Michael Laskaris =

Byzantine aristocrat, 13th century

Michael Tzamantouros Laskaris
- Μιχαήλ Τζαμάντουρος Λάσκαρις
- Occupations: Aristocrat, military commander, ambassador
- Era: Laskaris dynasty
- Title: Protosebastos, megas doux
- Relatives: Theodore I Laskaris (brother); Manuel Laskaris (brother); Irene Laskarina (niece); Theodore II Doukas Laskaris (grand-nephew)

Michael Tzamantouros Laskaris (Greek: Μιχαήλ Τζαμάντουρος Λάσκαρις, fl. 1254–1272) was a Byzantine aristocrat and military commander.

== Life ==
Michael was a younger brother of Theodore I Laskaris (r. 1205–1221), founder of the Empire of Nicaea. Michael and his brother Manuel bore the surname of Tzamantouros (Τζαμάντουρος), likely indicating that they had a different mother than Theodore and his other siblings.

Michael did not hold any office or court title during Theodore's reign, and under Theodore's successor, John III Doukas Vatatzes (r. 1221–1254) he was even exiled, along with his brother Manuel. On the accession of Theodore II Laskaris (r. 1254–1258) the two brothers were recalled to the court; while Manuel became a monk, Michael received the title of protosebastos and held unspecified military commands. Michael does not appear to have been remarked for his competence, but earned a reputation for prudent counsel.

After the death of Theodore II and the murder of George Mouzalon, Michael and Manuel put themselves forward as possible guardians over Theodore's underage son, John IV, without success, as Michael VIII Palaiologos was designated guardian, and soon became co-emperor. Michael was briefly exiled to Prusa, but quickly recalled by Palaiologos, who named him megas doux after the recapture of Constantinople. The post held command of the imperial navy, but Michael Laskaris, likely on account of his advanced age, never exercised this role, which instead went to the protostrator Alexios Doukas Philanthropenos. The only activity known of Michael Laskaris during this time is an embassy to King Stephen V of Hungary in 1271–1272. He died shortly after that, and was succeeded by Philanthropenos as megas doux.

== Sources ==
- Angelov, Dimiter (2019). The Byzantine Hellene: The Life of Emperor Theodore Laskaris and Byzantium in the Thirteenth Century. Cambridge University Press. ISBN 978-1-108-48071-0.
- Guilland, Rodolphe (1967). Recherches sur les institutions byzantines [Studies on the Byzantine Institutions]. Berliner byzantinische Arbeiten 35 (in French). Vol. 1. Berlin and Amsterdam: Akademie-Verlag & Adolf M. Hakkert. OCLC 878894516.
