= Palais Lascaris =

Building in Nice, France

Coordinates: 43.6977°N 7.2773°E

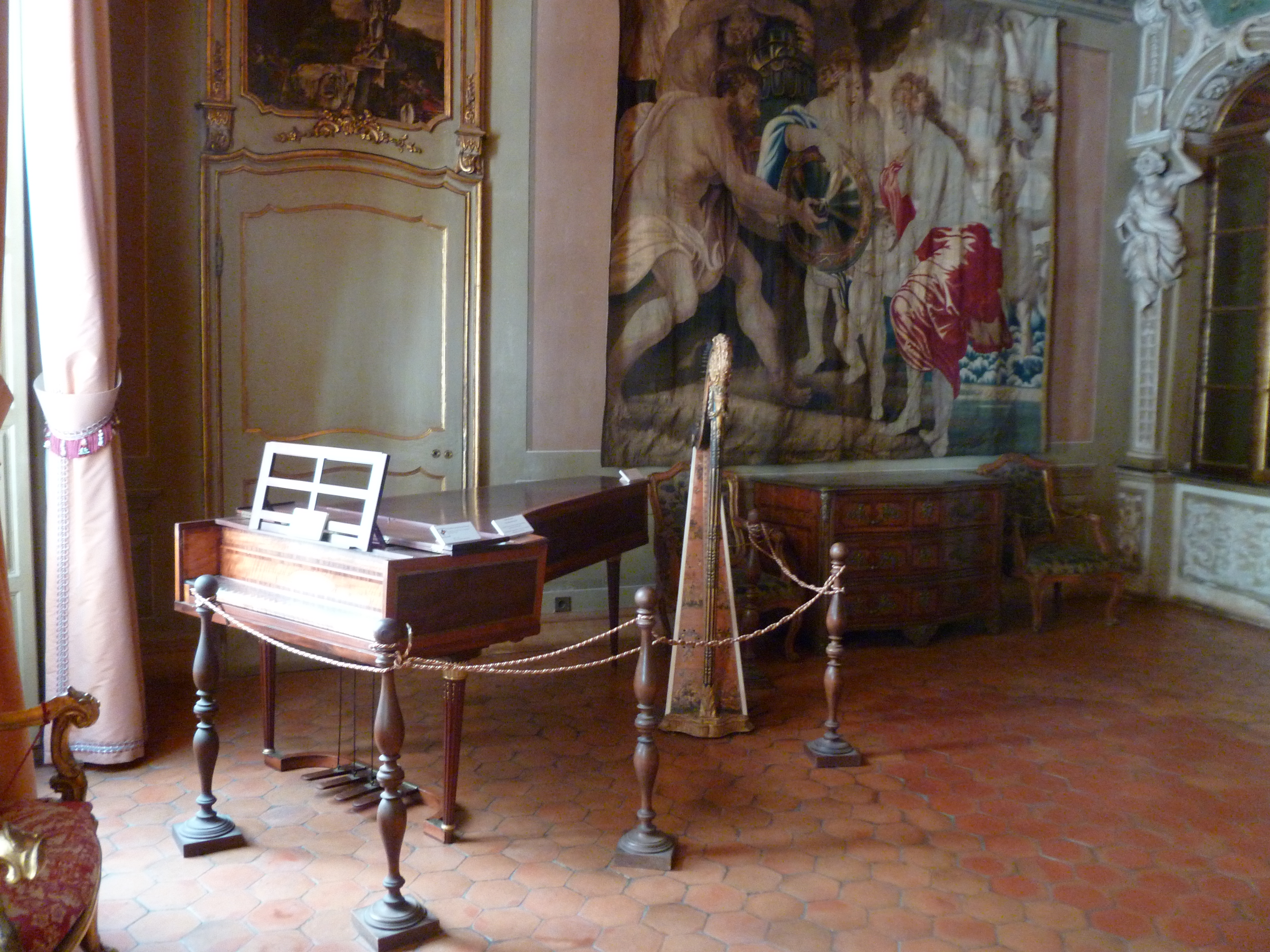
Room in Palais Lascaris, Nice

The Palais Lascaris is a seventeenth-century aristocratic building in Nice, France. Currently, it is a musical instrument museum. Located in the old town of Nice, it houses a collection of over 500 instruments, which makes it France’s second most important collection after the Musée de la Musique de la Philharmonie in Paris.

== History ==
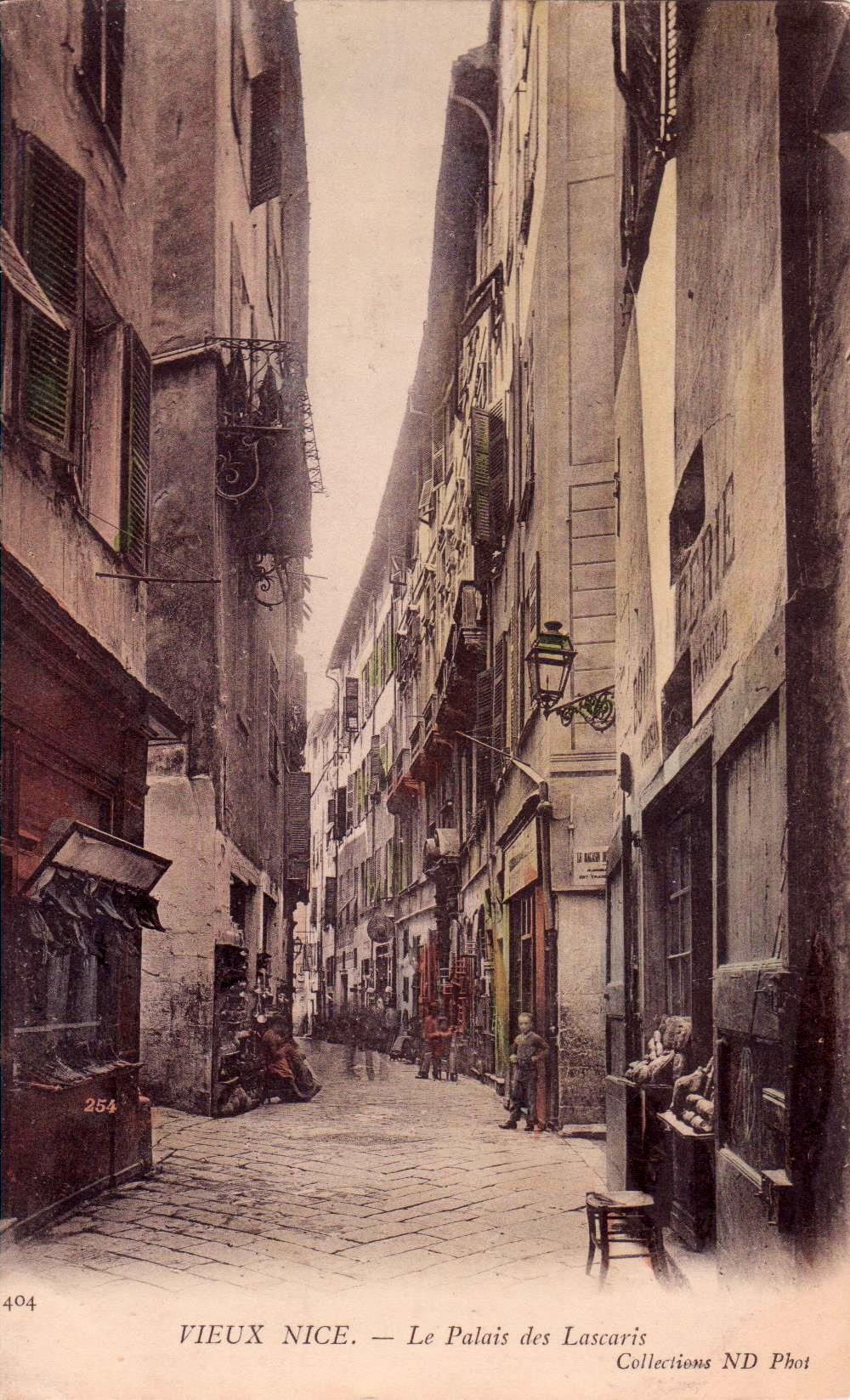
Palais Lascaris. Postcard, c. 1910

Built in the first half of the seventeenth century and altered in the eighteenth century, the palace was owned by the Vintimille-Lascaris family until 1802.

In 1942, it was bought by the city of Nice to create a museum.

Restorations began in 1962 and were completed in 1970, when the museum was opened to the public.

In 2001, the historical musical instrument collections of the city of Nice were transferred from the Musée Masséna to the Palais Lascaris with the project of transforming it into a music museum.

In 2011, the permanent exhibition of musical instruments was finally opened to the public.

== Current use ==
Today the palace devotes its exhibition space to the permanent exhibit of the collection of historical musical instruments, built around the bequest of Antoine Gautier (1825–1904).

== Collection ==
=== The bequest of the collection of Antoine Gautier ===
The historical musical instrument collection is formed around the bequest of the nineteenth-century niçois collector Antoine Gautier.

Antoine Gautier was born in Nice in 1825, son of Joseph Octave Gautier, rich wood merchant, and Félicité Rossetti, daughter of the préfet Rossetti and granddaughter of the senator Rossetti Following studies in classics at the Jesuit College (today the lycée Masséna), he became a jurist. An amateur musician, Antoine Gautier played the violin and the viola, and at the age of eighteen founded a quartet with his brother Raymond, in which Antoine played the viola.

At that time he began to hold a musical salon and also began collecting instruments in his home on the rue Papacino :

"Rue Papacino, we were in the Temple. Everything called for solemn consideration, the large library where the carefully bound and arranged collections were preserved alongside rare editions; the display cases [exhibiting] the gongs, hawaiien guitars, marine trumpets, archlutes, quintons, oboes d'amore, instruments by Maggini or Guarnieri, the four large oak music desks and the imposing Pleyel piano, elicited the visitors' admiration."

Many famous musicians visited his salon, including Jacques Thibaud and Eugène Ysaÿe; during one soirée in January 1902, Gabriel Fauré performed several of his compositions for piano. In 1903, the Gautier Quartet celebrated its sixtieth anniversary. The following year, Antoine Gautier died at his home, at the age of seventy-nine, leaving to the city of Nice his musical collections consisting of more than 225 instruments and a rare musical library.

The Gautier collection was bequeathed to the city of Nice in the testament of 26 May 1901 and by a codicil dated 8 June 1901. It was accepted by the city of Nice in a special session of the city council, on 19 September 1904.

The article of the testament that treats the bequest is succinct :

"Wanting to encourage the creation in Nice, the city of my birth, of a well-organised institution of musical education, I leave to the city of Nice sixty-thousand (60.000) francs, as well as my collections of musical instruments and accessories, scores and books music, on the sole condition of allotting six hundred (600) francs per year to a luthier charged with the maintenance of the instruments; I believe that Mr. Francois Bovis, luthier, would be the most fitting for this task."

Following the Antoine Gautier bequest, the city of Nice has continued to enrich this collection, which has been successively exhibited or preserved at the Musée des beaux-arts de Nice, the Musée Masséna, the Conservatoire de Nice, and today at the Palais Lascaris.

=== Highlights of the Collection ===
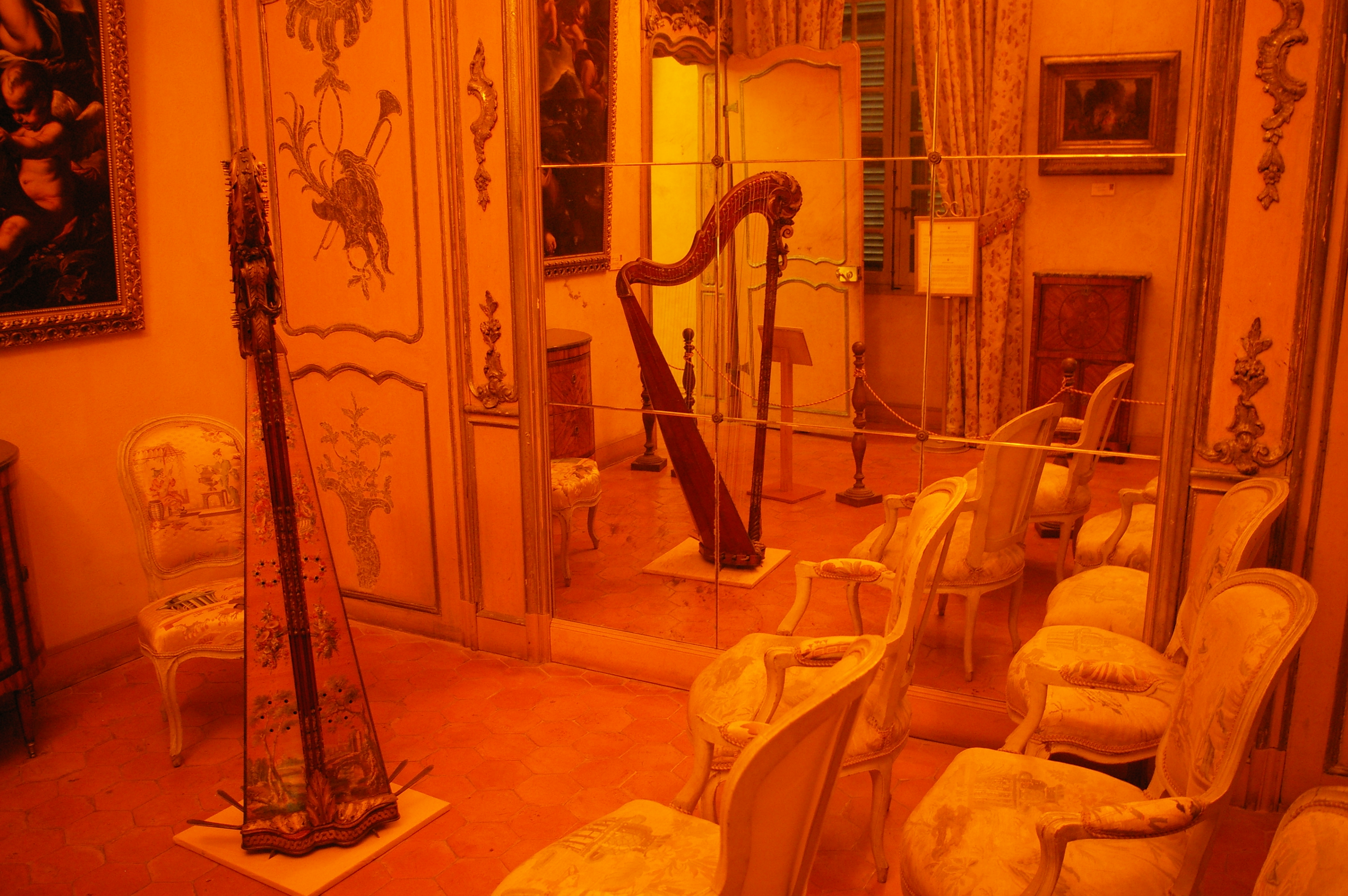
Naderman harp (1780)

Among the most important instruments are :

- a tenor sackbut by Anton Schnitzer (Nuremberg, 1581);
- several violas d'amore by Joannes Florenus Guidanti (Bologna, 1717), Gagliano (Naples, 1697), Johann Schorn (Salzburg, 1699) and Johann Ott (Füssen, 1727);
- several violas da gamba including that by William Turner (London, 1652);
- a bass violin by Paolo Antonio Testore (Milan, 1696);
- several extremely rare baroque guitars, including one by Giovanni Tesler (Ancona, 1618), one by René Voboam (Paris, c. 1650) and one by Jean Christophle (Avignon, 1645), which is one of the earliest surviving dated French guitars;
- several eighteenth-century recorders, including one by Johann Christoph Denner (Nuremberg, early eighteenth century);
- an anonymous eighteenth-century harpsichord (formerly a claviorganum);
- numerous harps : the first prototypes built by Sébastien Érard, including his first single-action harp and his first double-action harp; and a harp by Naderman (Paris, 1780) which formerly belonged to the Viscountess of Beaumont;
- a rare collection of clarinets;
- numerous experimental string instruments;
- several instruments made by Adolphe Sax, including a quartet of saxophones and a saxotromba;
- French keyboard instruments from the eighteenth to twentieth centuries, including a Pleyel piano (Paris, 1863) which once belonged to the Cercle Masséna in Nice;
- one of the most famous guitars by Antonio de Torres (Almeria, 1884) still in playable condition;
- a large collection of instruments from the South of France;
- approximately fifty nineteenth-century non-European instruments from the Gautier collection.
- In 2009, the AXA insurance group placed on permanent loan at the palais Lascaris the Gaveau-Érard-Pleyel Archives, presented to the public in two exhibitions : Érard, l'invention de la harpe moderne, 1811-2011 in 2011 and Le Clavier vivant/The Living Keyboard in 2012. This loan was cancelled in 2013.

The historical musical instrument collection of the Palais Lascaris is part of the MIMO (Musical Instrument Museums Online) Project, whose notices are accessible on the site of Europeana.

== Photo gallery ==
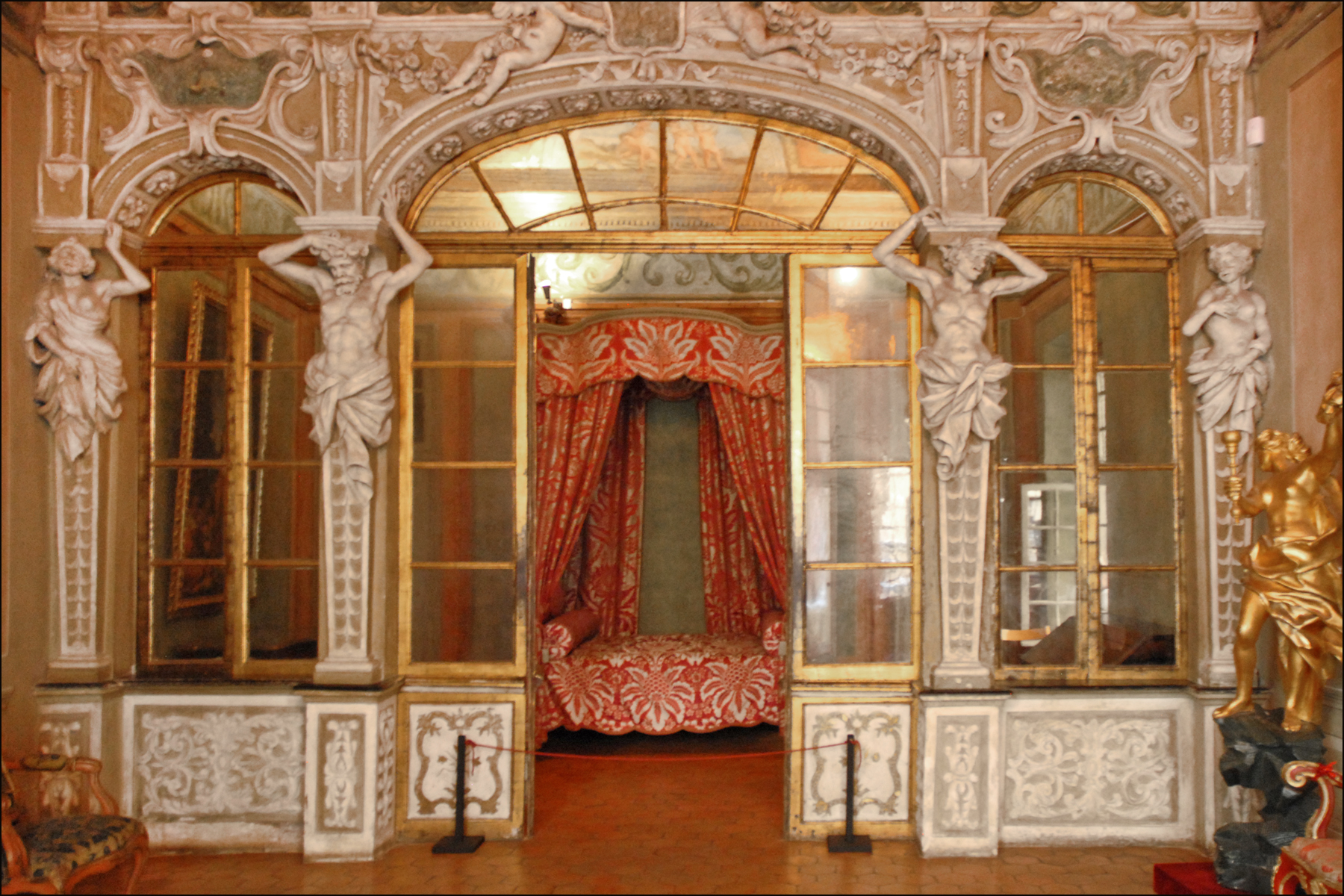
Ceremonial room

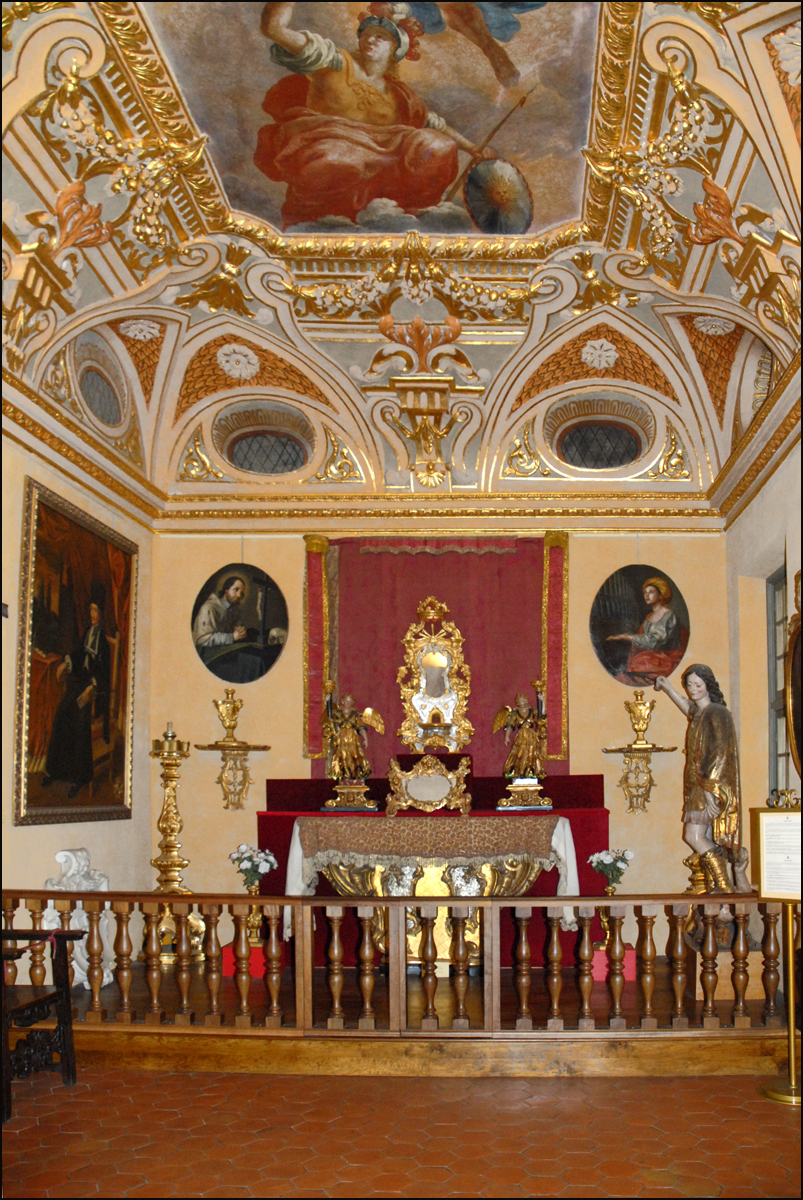
Chapel

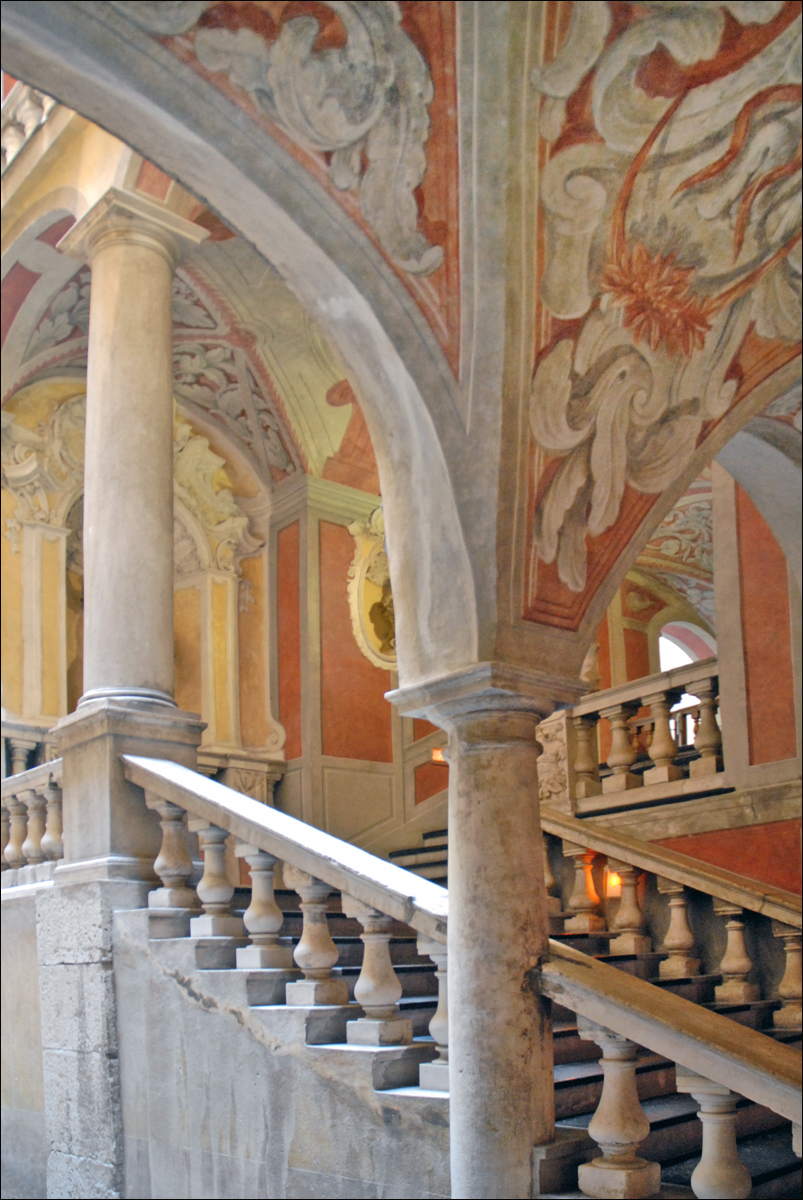
Stairway

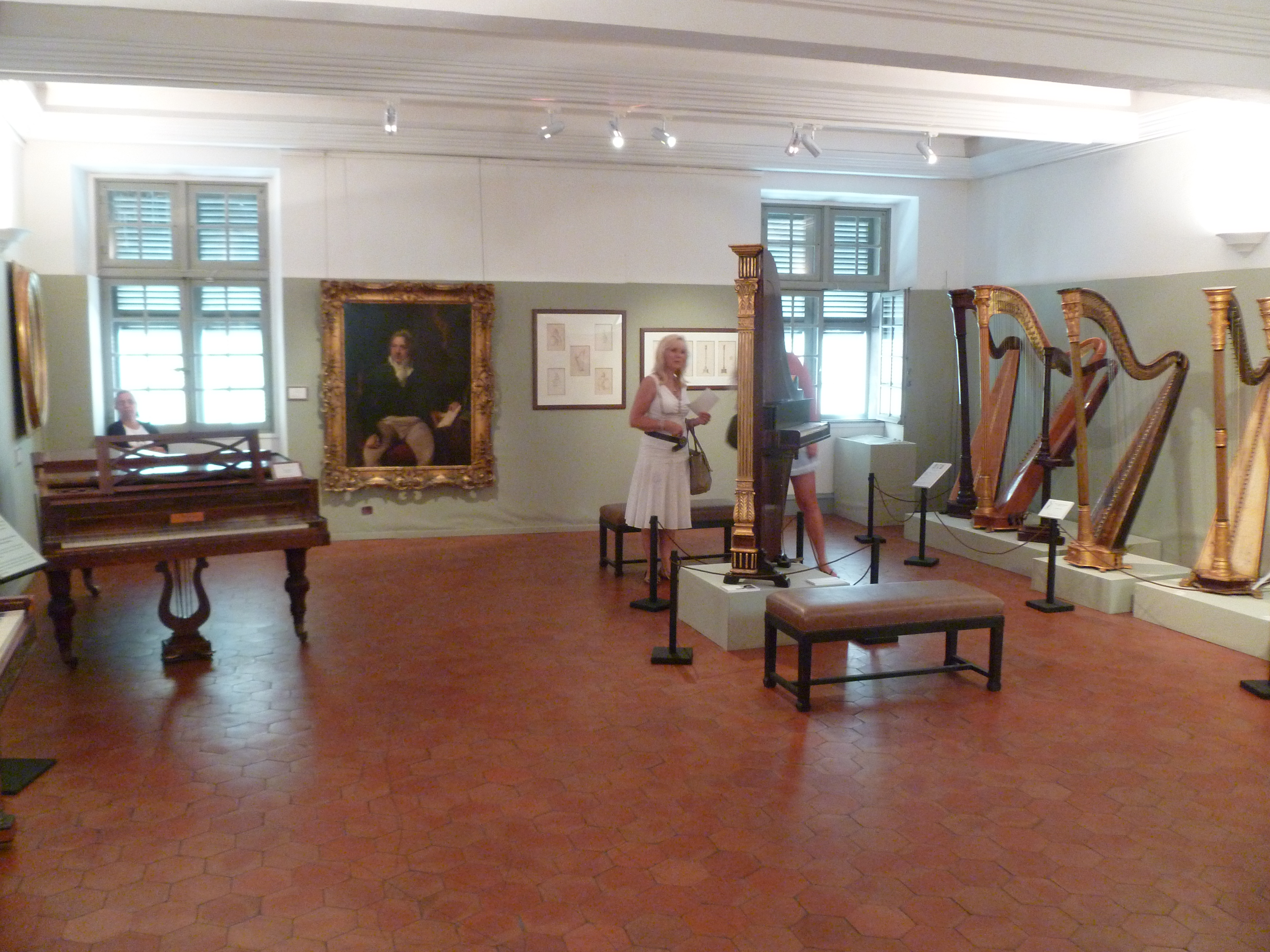
Exhibition in the museum

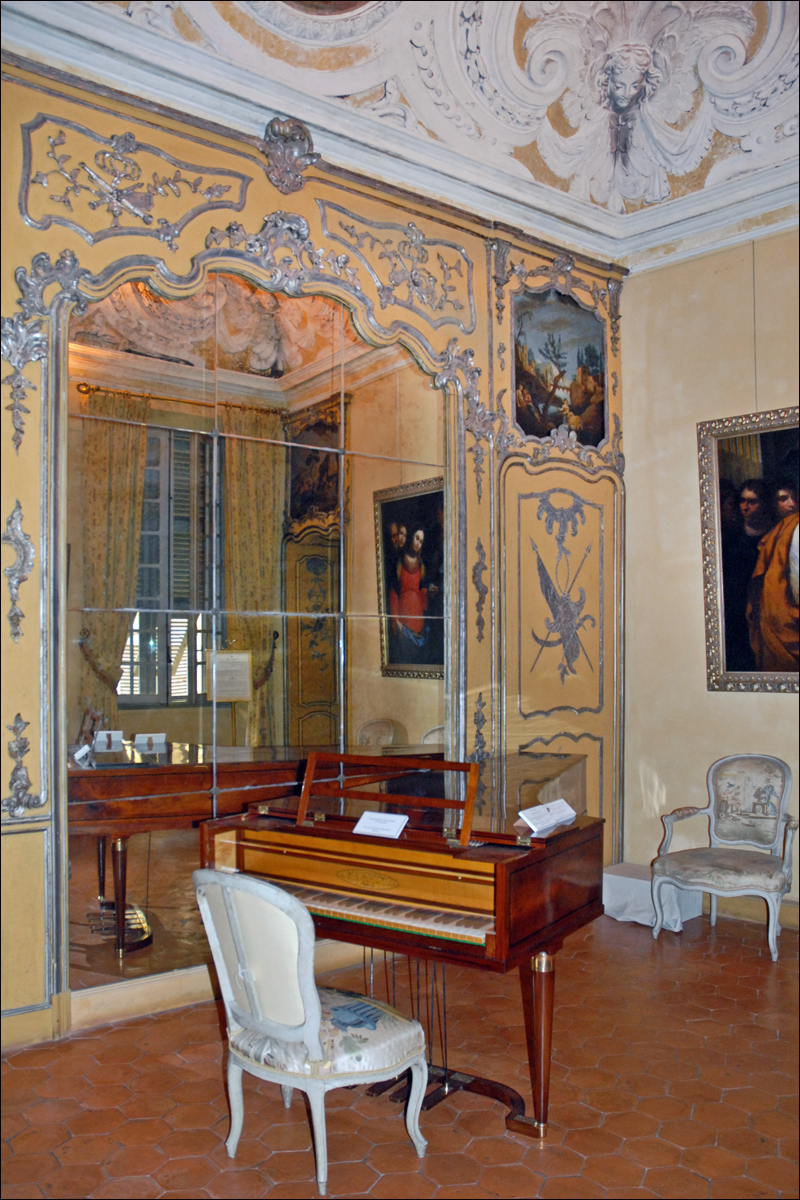
Instrument exhibited in one of the galleries

== See also ==
- List of music museums
