= Marie of Courtenay =

Empress consort of Nicaea and Regent of the Latin Empire

Empress consort of Nicaea
- Tenure: 1219–1221

Regent of the Latin Empire
- Regency: 1227–1228
- Born: c. 1204
- Died: September 1228 (age about 24)
- Spouse: Theodore I Laskaris
- House: Capetian House of Courtenay
- Father: Peter II of Courtenay
- Mother: Yolanda, Latin Empress

Marie de Courtenay (c. 1204 – September 1228) ruled as Empress consort of the Empire of Nicaea from 1219-1221. She was also regent of the Latin Empire of Constantinople from 1228 until her death. Marie is an important figure in understanding the power struggles between the Byzantine successor states between 1204-1261. She is also an example of the power women had in the 13th century, and how marriages were used by Western Europe to excerpt power into Eastern European affairs.

Marie de Courtenay was born into the ruling family of the Latin Empire of Constantinople. The Latin Empire of Constantinople was one of the states that resulted from the fourth crusade, and the sack on Constantinople. Other important states resulting from the fourth crusade were the Empire of Nicaea, the Empire of Trebizond, the Despotate of Epirus, and later the Empire of Thessalonica. The Latin Empire was viewed with less legitimacy because it was foreign, and Catholic as opposed to keeping Orthodox Christianity, and traditional forms of Byzantine government. Marie was a daughter of Peter II of Courtenay and Yolanda of Flanders. Yolanda arranged a marriage between Marie and Emperor Theodore I Laskaris of Nicaea.She served as Empress consort of Nicaea from 1219 until her husbands death in 1221. Marie served as regent for her younger brother, Baldwin II, Latin Emperor, in 1228, and styled herself "Empress of Constantinople."

== Family and background ==
The fourth crusade which ended in 1204, was intended to regain control of Jerusalem and other Holy Land sites from Muslim control. Instead it led to the sack on Constantinople which was a significantly large Christian city, and the fall of the Byzantine Empire. The Byzantine Empire split into several empires that competed for power and claims of Byzantine legitimacy. Byzantium would eventually be re-established in 1261. Marie's parents were successive rulers of the Latin Empire of Constantinople. Her father Peter was chosen as the Empire's third emperor, in 1216, but in 1217, while attempting to reach Constantinople by land instead of by sea, in order to sit on the throne of his empire for the first time, he was captured by Theodore Komnenos Doukas, the ruler of Epirus, and spent the remainder of his life imprisoned. Thus Peter never made it to Constantinople to rule over the Latin Empire. The capture of Peter was a significant event that exposed the weakness of the Latin Empire. It also empowered and increased the legitimacy of the other successor states. Marie's mother Yolanda however did reach Constantinople and she took over the Empire. Yolanda ruled alone as Empress from 1217 to 1219. A prominent thing that Yolanda did was negotiate an alliance with Theodore I Laskaris of the more powerful Empire of Nicaea, which was sealed with the marriage of Theodore and Marie after Theodore annulled his marriage to his second wife Philippa of Armenia.This political marriage strengthened the relationship of Constantinople and Nicaea. Because of the frequent changes in leadership, the Latin Empire remained weaker than the other successor states.

== Empress of Nicaea ==
Marie was Empress consort of Nicaea through her marriage to Theodore I Laskaris of Nicaea, from 1219 to November 1221 when Theodore died. A consort is the title of the spouse of an Emperor during this time. They had no known children and left the throne of Nicaea without a male heir. One of her stepdaughters, Maria Laskarina, became the wife of King Béla IV of Hungary, and the other, Irene Lascarina, was married to John III Doukas Vatatzes, who as Theodore's son-in law, became the next Emperor of the Nicaean Empire. The Empire of Nicaea would eventually become the most powerful of the successor states, and re-establish Byzantium in 1261. These marriages created alliances in many different places across Europe. Marie briefly served as regent of Nicaea in 1222. Regencies were common in this day and age whenever there was a vacancy in power, or the next ruler was too young to begin ruling on their own.

== Regent of Constantinople ==
Her brother Robert of Courtenay succeeded their mother in 1219 following her death.

Mary was her brother Emperor Robert's de facto co-ruler. She brought back to Constantinople Byzantine-influenced ideas of her own on government and emperorship. Philippe Mouskes reported that the emperor shared the government of his empire with her. Robert appointed Mary as regent when he left for Rome in 1227.

In late January 1228, Robert died and was succeeded by his younger brother, Baldwin II of Courtenay. He was ten years old at the time, much too young to be the sole ruler of the Empire. Because Baldwin was too young at the time of Robert's death, the barons of Constantinople elected Marie to be regent, and she styled herself "Empress". Her regency lasted only until her own death eight months later in September of 1228.

According to a letter she sent to Ubaldo of Pisa in 1228, she titled herself Maria, Dei gratia imperatrix, baiula imperii Constantinopolitani (Maria, empress by the grace of God, bearer of the Constantinopolitan empire).

The constant change in leadership of the Latin Empire made it so that it did not have significant control or territory of land outside of Constantinople itself. Marie's rule as regent therefore was during a great time of instability and weakness of the Empire.

== Aftermath and Legacy ==
Marie's death in 1228 added to the list of frequent rulers in the Empire of Constantinople, and to the instability of the empire. Marie's brother Baldwin II took over eventually in 1237 as the next Emperor of the Latin Empire. Baldwin would grow up to be the last Emperor of the Latin Empire of Constantinople. Nicaea continued to grow stronger and eventually recaptured Constantinople in July of 1261. Baldwin had to flee to western Europe. And Byzantium would be re-established, however it never rose to its former power, before the fourth crusade in 1204.

== Sources ==
- Lock, Peter (2013). The Franks in the Aegean: 1204-1500. Routledge.
- Lock, Peter (1995). The Franks in the Aegean, 1204-1500. Longman Group Limited.
- Ostrogorsky, George (1995). History of the Byzantine State. Translated by Hussey, Joan. Rutgers University Press.
- Tricht, Filip Van (2013). "Robert of Courtenay (1221–1227): An Idiot on the Throne of Constantinople?". Speculum. 88 (4): 996–1034. doi:10.1017/S0038713413002789.

Marie of Courtenay House of Courtenay Born: c. 1204 Died: 1228
Royal titles
Preceded by Philippa of Armenia	Empress consort of Nicaea; 1219–1222	Succeeded by Irene Laskarina
