= Poemanenum =

Greek town of ancient Mysia

Coordinates: 40°04′44″N 27°53′32″E

Poemanenum or Poimanenon (Ancient Greek: Ποιμάνινον) was a Greek town of ancient Mysia, south of Cyzicus and on the southwest of Lake Aphnitis. It belonged to the territory of Cyzicus was well fortified, and possessed a celebrated temple of Asclepius. Other writers call the town Poemanenus or Poimanenos (Ποιμανηνός) or Poemanentus or Poimanentos (Ποιμάνεντος). Its inhabitants are called Poemaneni (Ποιμανηνοί) According to the Notitiae Episcopatuum, it became a bishopric. No longer a residential see, it remains a titular see of the Roman Catholic Church. Nearby was fought the Battle of Poemanenum in 1223 or 1224.

Its site is located near Alexa in Asiatic Turkey.
