= Irene Laskarina =

- Augusta
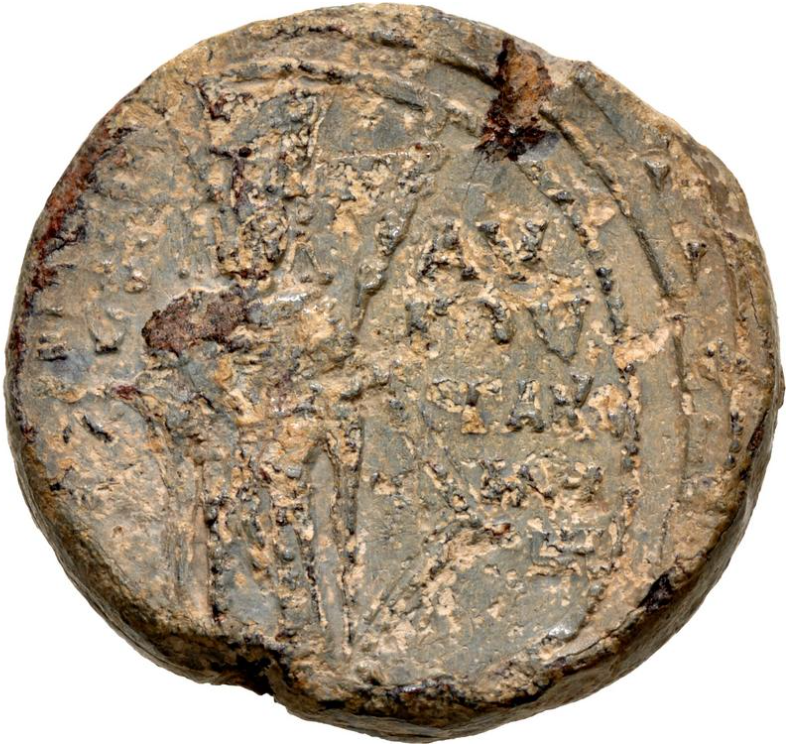
- Seal of Irene Laskarina

Empress consort of Nicaea
- Tenure: 1222–1240
- Born: c. 1194-9
- Died: 1240
- Spouse: Andronikos Palaiologos; John III Doukas Vatatzes
- Issue: Theodore II Doukas Laskaris
- House: Laskaris
- Father: Theodore I Komnenos Laskaris
- Mother: Anna Komnene Angelina

Irene Laskarina (c. 1194-9 – 1240) (Greek: Εἰρήνη Λασκαρίνα, romanized: Eirēnē Laskarina) was Empress consort of Nicaea. She was a daughter of Theodore I Komnenos Laskaris, emperor of Nicaea and Anna Komnene Angelina. Her maternal grandparents were Alexios III Angelos and Euphrosyne Doukaina Kamatera. Her sister, Maria Laskarina, married Béla IV of Hungary.

In 1204, during Irene Laskarina's childhood, the city of Constantinople fell to a Crusader army during the Sack of Constantinople. Much of the nobility, including Irene's family, fled, and re-established a capitol in Nicaea; this became the Nicaean empire.

Irene first married the general Andronikos Palaiologos, and after his death became the wife of Theodore's designated successor, the future John III Doukas Vatatzes in 1212. They had a son, the future Theodore II Doukas Laskaris. After the latter's birth, she fell from a horse and was so badly injured that she was unable to have any more children. She retired to a convent, taking the monastic name Eugenia, and died there in summer of 1240, some fourteen years before her husband.

Irene is praised by historians for her modesty and prudence and is said to have brought about by her example a considerable improvement in the morals of her nation.

== Notes ==
Irene Laskarina Laskaris Born: ? Died: 1240
Royal titles
Preceded by Marie de Courtenay	Empress consort of Nicaea; 1221–1240	Succeeded by Anna of Hohenstaufen
