= Thierry de Loos =

Thierry de Looz
- Born: unknown Flanders
- Died: unknown, probably c. 1208
- Military career
- Allegiance: Kingdom of France, Latin Empire
- Rank: Duke of Nicomedia, Seneschal of 'Romania'
- Conflicts: Fourth Crusade, Siege of Constantinople (1203), Sack of Constantinople (1204), Battle of Rusion

Thierry de Loos (alternatively, Dietrich von Los) was a Franco-Flemish nobleman who took part in the Fourth Crusade and afterwards became prominent within the Latin Empire.

== Life ==
=== Origins and participation in the Fourth Crusade ===
Thierry was a younger son of Gerard I, Count of Loos and Marie of Guelders. He was also a nephew of Geoffrey of Villehardouin, a crusader leader and chronicler. Thierry, with the other participants of the Fourth Crusade, which had been diverted from the Holy Land, took part in the Siege of Constantinople in 1203 and the sacking of the same city a year later. In 1204 he led the troops of the Latin Empire that captured the blind ex-emperor of Byzantium, Alexios V Doukas. The captured Alexios was taken to Constantinople by Thierry, where he was tried for treason and the murder of Alexios IV Angelos and executed.

=== Prominence within the Latin Empire ===
At some time after 1204 Thierry was appointed 'Seneschal of Romania' (Romania being the Latin Empire). Thierry was a prominent Latin commander at the Battle of Rusion in 1206, where his army was defeated by the Bulgarians. His brother, Willans (Willeaume) de Looz, was also prominent at the battle, where he was killed commanding the Latin rearguard. Also in 1206, Thierry de Loos was invested by the Latin government with the city and region of Nicomedia as a fief, with the title duke. He occupied the city and fortified its cathedral of the Divine Wisdom. Thierry was captured outside Nicomedia by the Nicaean Emperor Theodore Laskaris, but was soon released following a negotiated truce. As a condition of the truce, Nicomedia was evacuated by the Latins and its fortifications destroyed. Thierry de Loos is described as being deceased in a document of 1209.

== Bibliography ==
- Akropolites, G. The History, trans. Ruth Macrides (2007) Oxford University Press
- Bury, J.B. (series planner) (1923) The Cambridge Medieval History, Volume 4: The Eastern Roman Empire (717-1453), Cambridge University Press
- Chenaye-Desbois, François Alexandre Aubert de la (1775) Dictionnaire de la Noblesse ... de France, Tome IX, Antoine Boudet, Paris.
- Choniates, N.: Magoulias, Harry J., ed. (1984). O City of Byzantium. Annals of Niketas Choniates. Detroit: Wayne State University Press. ISBN 0-8143-1764-2.
- Falk, A. (2010) Franks and Saracens: Reality and Fantasy in the Crusades, Karnac Books
- Geoffrey de Villehardouin, translated by M. R. B. Shaw (1963), Joinville and Villehardouin: Chronicles of the Crusades, Penguin, London
- Hendrickx, B. and Matzukis, C. (1979) Alexios V Doukas Mourtzouphlos: His Life, Reign and Death (?-1204), in Hellenika (Έλληνικά) 31, pp. 111–117
