= Nicholas Laskaris =

Byzantine co-emperor from 1208 to 1210

- Emperor and Autocrat of the Romans

Byzantine emperor
- Co-reign: 1208 – 1210
- Predecessor: Alexios V Doukas
- Successor: John III Doukas Vatatzes
- Senior emperor: Theodore I Komnenos Laskaris
- Died: 1210
- Dynasty: Laskaris
- Father: Theodore I Komnenos Laskaris
- Mother: Anna Komnene Angelina

Nicholas Laskaris (Note: If we were to count the brief "reign" of Nicholas Kanabos, Nicholas Laskaris would be counted as Nicholas II)(Greek: Νικόλαος Λάσκαρις, romanized: Nikólaos Láskaris; unknown – 1210) was the eldest son of the Byzantine emperor Theodore I Laskaris (r. 1205–1221). He was junior co-emperor alongside his father during the latter's reign.

== Biography ==
Nicholas Laskaris was born to Theodore I Laskaris and his first wife Anna Komnene Angelina. He was the couple's first son.

He was declared his father's co-emperor in 1208, but he was not mentioned after 1210.

== Sources ==
- Angelov, Dimiter (2019). The Byzantine Hellene: The Life of Emperor Theodore Laskaris and Byzantium in the Thirteenth Century. Cambridge University Press. ISBN 978-1-108-48071-0.
- Angold, Michael (2011). "The Latin Empire of Constantinople, 1204–1261: Marriage Strategies". Identities and Allegiances in the Eastern Mediterranean after 1204. Farnham: Ashgate Publishing Limited. pp. 47–68. ISBN 9781409410980.
