= Theodore I Laskaris =

Emperor of Nicaea from 1205 to 1221

Theodore I Komnenos Laskaris
- Emperor and Autocrat of the Romans
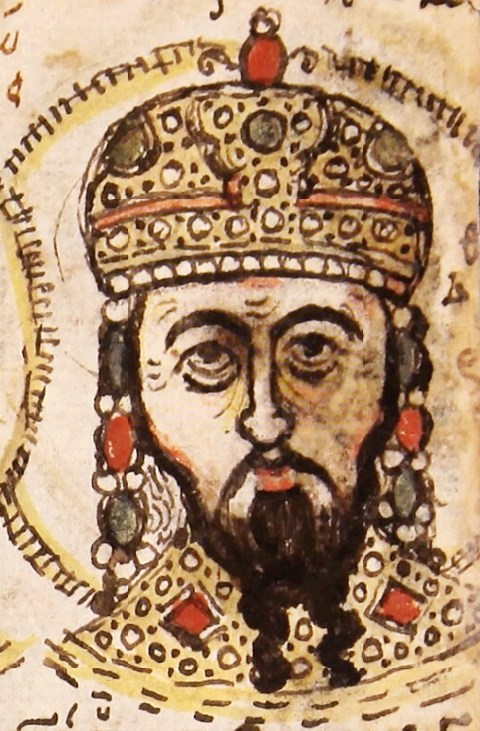
- Portrait of Theodore I (from a 15th-century codex containing a copy of the Extracts of History by Joannes Zonaras)

Emperor of Nicaea Claimant Byzantine Emperor in exile
- Reign: May 1205–November 1221
- Coronation: 6 April 1208
- Predecessor: Constantine Laskaris (possibly); Alexios V Doukas
- Successor: John III Doukas Vatatzes
- Co-emperor: Nicholas Laskaris (1208–c. 1210)
Pre-imperial positions
Despot
In office 1203–1205
Monarch	Alexios III Angelos
Preceded by	Alexios Palaiologos
Succeeded by	Constantine Laskaris
Protovestiarites Sebastos
In office c. 1200 – 1203
Monarch	Alexios III Angelos
- Born: c. 1175
- Died: November 1221 (aged c. 46)
- Spouses: Anna Komnene Angelina; Philippa of Armenia; Maria of Courtenay
- Issue: Irene Laskarina; Maria Laskarina; Eudokia Laskarina; Nicholas Laskaris; John Laskaris
Names
- Theodore Komnenos Laskaris; Θεόδωρος Κομνηνὸς Λάσκαρις
- House: Laskaris
- Father: Nicholas (?) Laskaris
- Religion: Greek Orthodox

Theodore I Komnenos Laskaris or Lascaris (Greek: Θεόδωρος Κομνηνὸς Λάσκαρις, romanized: Theodōros Komnēnós Láskaris; c. 1175 – November 1221) was the first emperor of Nicaea—a successor state of the Byzantine Empire—from 1205 to his death. Although he was born to an obscure aristocratic family, his mother was related to the imperial Komnenos clan. He married Anna, a younger daughter of Emperor Alexios III Angelos in 1200. He received the title of despot before 1203, demonstrating his right to succeed his father-in-law on the throne.

The Fourth Crusade forced Alexios III to flee from Constantinople in 1203. Theodore was imprisoned by the crusaders (commonly referred to as "Latins" by the Byzantines), but he escaped. After crossing the Bosporus into Asia Minor (in present-day Turkey), he started to organise the local Greeks' resistance against the Latins in Bithynia in his father-in-law's name. He concluded an alliance with the Seljuq sultan of Rum, but he could not stop the Latins' expansion. Neither could he prevent a claimant to the imperial throne, Alexios Komnenos, from establishing a Byzantine successor state, the Empire of Trebizond, in northern Asia Minor. Theodore's position consolidated only after Tzar Kaloyan of Bulgaria inflicted a crushing defeat on the Latins in the Battle of Adrianople (in Thrace) in 1205.

Greeks fleeing from the Latin Empire — the crusader state that emerged in the Byzantine core territories — swarmed to Asia Minor to live under Theodore's rule. The Latins captured Theodore's father-in-law and made an alliance with Alexios I of Trebizond, but Theodore routed their united troops. He secured the support of most Bithynian aristocrats and seized the domains of those who resisted him. In 1205, he assumed the traditional titles of the Byzantine emperors. Three years later, he convoked a Church council to elect a new Orthodox patriarch of Constantinople. The new patriarch crowned Theodore emperor and established his seat at Theodore's capital, Nicaea. The Orthodox population of the Latin Empire regarded Theodore as the main defender of their Church, but the rulers of Epirus—a realm that developed in the western regions of the Byzantine Empire—debated the legality of his coronation.

Theodore's father-in-law did not abandon his claim to the throne. After being released from prison, Alexios III persuaded the Seljuqs to invade Nicaea, but Theodore defeated them in 1211. The Latin Emperor Henry of Flanders captured important fortresses in western Asia Minor in 1212, but he ran out of soldiers and could not place garrisons in them. Henry implicitly acknowledged the existence of the Empire of Nicaea in his peace treaty with Theodore. Theodore conquered western Paphlagonia on the Black Sea coast from Alexios I of Trebizond. Around 1220, Theodore tried to persuade the Latins of Constantinople to acknowledge his rule, but they refused. Theodore established a powerful state, located in the vicinity of Constantinople, which enabled his successors to expel the Latins from the city and revive the Byzantine Empire in 1261.

== Early life ==
=== Parentage ===
Theodore Komnenos Laskaris was born to a noble, but not particularly renowned, Byzantine family around 1175. (Note: George Akropolites stated that Theodore was "more than 45 years old but less than 50" when he died in 1221, implying that he was born between 1171 and 1176. Nicephorus Gregoras said that Theodore was "around 30 years old" when he was proclaimed emperor in 1205.) His parents' names are unknown. If Theodore followed the Byzantine custom of giving his father's name to his firstborn son, his father was called Nicholas. Theodore's mother belonged to an unidentified branch of the imperial Komnenos family and he proudly adopted her surname. Theodore had no fewer than six brothers — Constantine, George, Alexios, Isaac, Manuel and Michael. Manuel and Michael must have been born to a different mother, as they bore the surname Tzamantouros instead of Komnenos. Theodore was also related to the aristocratic Phokas family, most likely through the marriage of one of his aunts.

The Laskaris held estates in western Asia Minor. Both Theodore and his brother, Constantine, had a seal representing Saint George and bearing the inscription Diasorites. The seal expressed their connection to the monastery of Saint George Diasorites, located in Pyrgion in the valley of the river Kaistros.

=== Early career ===
The contemporaneous historian Niketas Choniates introduced Theodore as a "daring youth and fierce warrior" in his chronicle. The slightly later historian George Akropolites recorded that Theodore was "small in body but not excessively so, quite dark, and had a flowing beard forked at the end". Theodore rose to prominence through his family ties with the Komnenoi. His first extant seal mentions his titles of sebastos and protovestiarites. The first one was a court title, originally reserved for the Byzantine emperors' relatives, but Emperor Alexios III Angelos (r. 1195–1203) started to sell it to wealthy merchants. As protovestiarites, Theodore was the commander of a cadet unit of the guards of the imperial palace.

Emperor Alexios III, who had no sons, wanted to solve the problem of succession by marrying off his two eldest daughters. Late in 1200, he gave his firstborn daughter, Irene, in marriage to Alexios Palaiologos, and her younger sister, Anna, to Theodore. Palaiologos was elevated to the rank of despot, demonstrating his right to succeed his father-in-law on the throne. When Palaiologos died before 1203, Theodore received the same title.

=== Fall of Constantinople ===
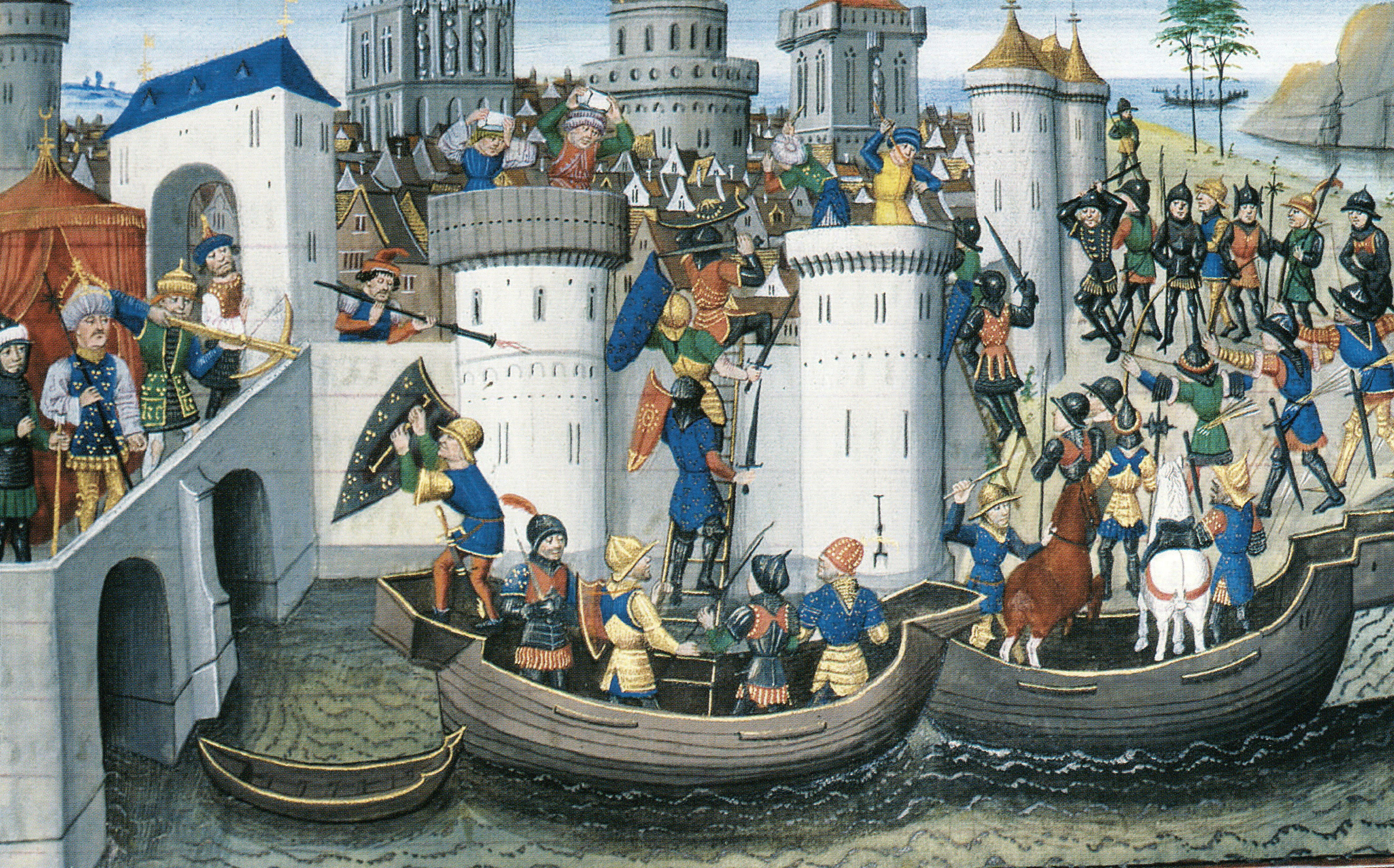
Crusaders besieging Constantinople in 1204.

To seize the Byzantine throne, Emperor Alexios III had blinded and imprisoned his elder brother, Isaac II Angelos (r. 1185–1195). Isaac's son, Alexios, fled from Constantinople to Germany to seek his Catholic relatives' assistance. He concluded an agreement with the leaders of the Fourth Crusade, promising a large sum, 800,000 hyperpyra, for their support. The crusaders reached Constantinople and captured Pera on the opposite coast of the Golden Horn on 6 July 1203. Theodore conducted raids against the invaders, but they laid siege to the Byzantine capital. The walls of Constantinople were vulnerable, and Alexios III fled in panic to Thrace during the night of 17–18 July. He drained the treasury and took the imperial insignia with him.

Isaac II was released and his son was crowned his co-emperor as Alexios IV. Theodore was imprisoned after his father-in-law's flight, but he escaped in September 1203. The details of his escape are unknown, but Choniates stated that Theodore left Constantinople "armed only with practical wisdom and a brave spirit". For a while, Theodore was hiding in a church dedicated to Saint Michael. Theodore himself claimed that God "miraculously removed" him from the prison and guided him across the Bosporus to Asia Minor. His wife and daughters accompanied him. They reached Nicaea, but the city's leadership only admitted his family, because they feared Alexios IV's revenge. Theodore, as he later remembered, moved "from one region to another", avoiding the traps that his (unidentified) enemies laid for him.

Alexios IV could not pay off the crusaders. They refused to leave Constantinople and raided and plundered the nearby Thracian villages. The Byzantines blamed Alexios IV for the crusaders' acts. The army rebelled and proclaimed the general Alexios Mourtzouphlos Doukas emperor on 28 January 1204. Isaac II had already died, and the new emperor had Alexios IV murdered, providing the crusaders with an excuse to make a new assault on Constantinople again. When they breached the walls on 12 April, Alexios V fled. A group of aristocrats offered the imperial crown to Theodore's brother, Constantine, but he rejected it. The crusaders captured Constantinople and plundered it completely.

Although the Byzantine capital fell to the crusaders, neither Alexios III Angelos nor Alexios V Doukas abandoned their claim to the throne. A third claimant soon appeared on the scene: a grandson of Emperor Andronikos I Komnenos (r. 1183–1185), Alexios, seized Trebizond on the Black Sea coast in Asia Minor and assumed the title of emperor. The crusaders elected one of their leader, Baldwin of Flanders, emperor in May 1204.

=== Resistance ===
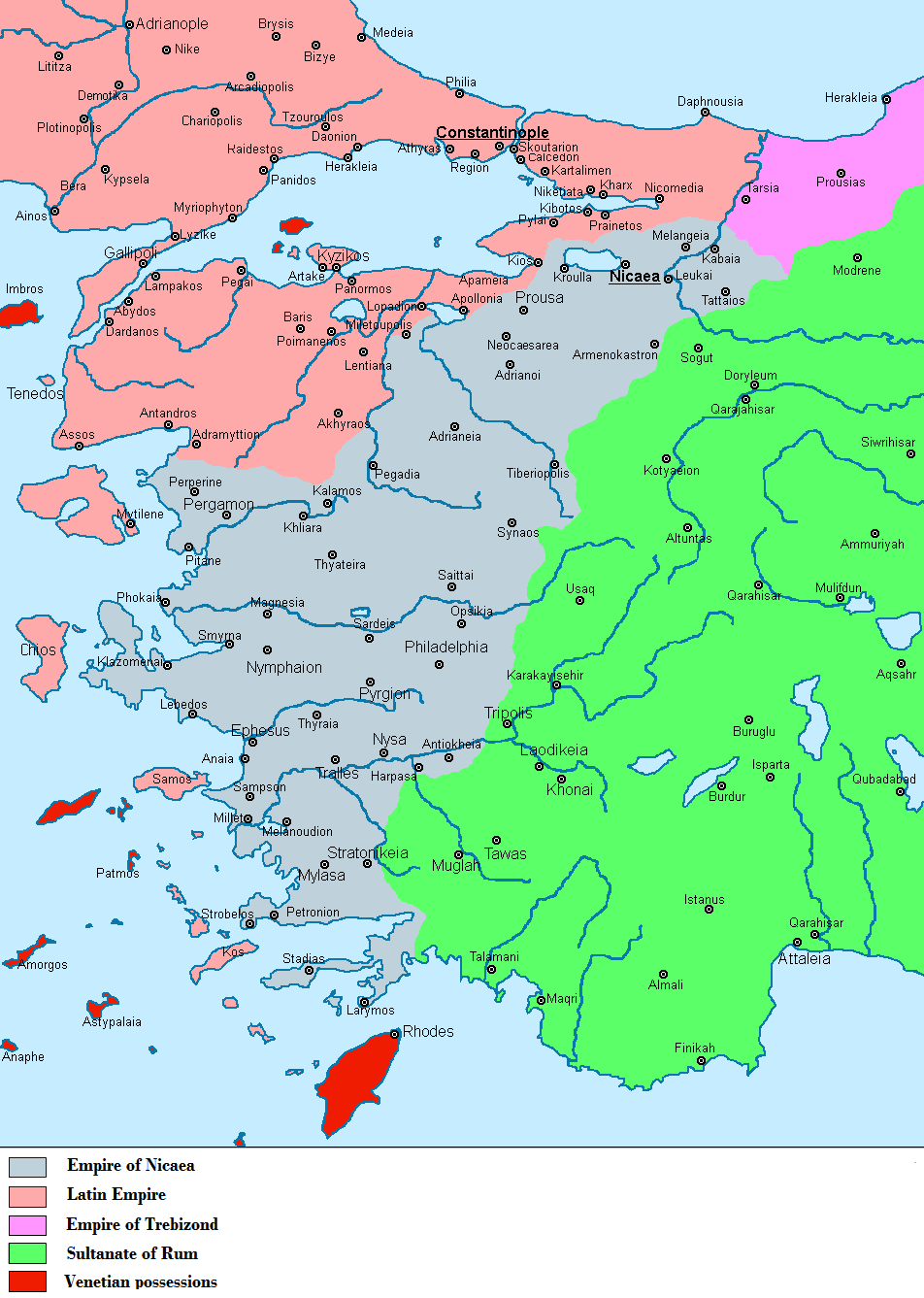
Theodore's realm 1205.

By the time of Theodore's arrival, Asia Minor had been a centre of uprisings against the imperial government for decades. A rebellious magnate, Theodore Mangaphas, held Philadelphia; another aristocrat, Sabas Asidenos, ruled Sampson; and Nikephoros Kontostephanos controlled the lands on the upper course of the Maeander River. Theodore appeared as his father-in-law's representative and secured the Bithynian towns' loyalty in Alexios III's name until the end of 1204. The local Greeks acknowledged him as the strategos (or military leader) of Bithynia. He established his seat in Bursa, but he made frequent journeys to attend assemblies and dinners, encouraging the local Greeks' resistance against the "Latins", as the crusaders were universally called. He also took control of state revenues, and he could offer money to the Seljuq Sultan of Rum, Rukn al-Din Suleiman II, in return for his assistance against the Latins. Suleiman II died and his underage son, Izz al-Din Kilij Arslan III, succeeded him in June 1204.

The crusaders set up a commission to distribute the Byzantine territories among them in September. In Asia Minor, the "duchy of Nicaea" was granted to Louis I, Count of Blois, and the "duchy of Philadelphia" to Stephen of Perche, although the Latins had not conquered these lands. The Venetians seized the port of Lampsacus on the Asian side of the Hellespont and a French knight, Peter of Bracieux, captured the nearby Pegai. Emperor Alexios I of Trebizond's brother and co-emperor, David Komnenos, launched a military campaign into Paphlagonia and occupied the towns along the Black Sea coast. His conquest facilitated Bracieux's invasion of Bithynia. He routed Theodore at Poemanenum on 6 December and his victory enabled him to seize Bythinian forts.

The Latins captured and publicly executed Alexios V in Constantinople. They also arrested Alexios III in Thessaly, forcing him to cede the imperial insignia to them early in 1205. A grandson of Emperor Manuel I Komnenos (r. 1143–1180), Manuel Maurozomes, and Maurozomes's son-in-law, the deposed Sultan of Rum, Ghiyāth al-Dīn Kaykhusraw I, came to Nicaea. Theodore detained them, but they soon came to terms. He lent money to Kaykhusraw to regain his throne in return for his promise of military support. Kaykhusraw and Maurozomes hurried to Konya, the capital of Rum. They dethroned the underage Kilij Arslan in Kaykhusraw's favor in March 1205.

By the end of 1204, the Latins had captured Thrace, Thessaly and northern Greece. Emperor Alexios III's cousin, Michael Doukas, who organised the Greeks' resistance in Epirus, was forced to swear fealty to Pope Innocent III to secure his protection. Emperor Baldwin dispatched his brother, Henry, to conquer Asia Minor early in 1205. Henry defeated Theodore Mangaphas and Theodore Laskaris' brother, Constantine, in the Battle of Adramyttion on 19 March 1205. The Latins could not follow up their victory, because Tzar Kaloyan of Bulgaria stirred up a rebellion in Thrace and invaded the province. Kaloyan's invasion forced Emperor Baldwin to withdraw his knights from Anatolia. Kaloyan inflicted a crushing defeat on the Latin army in the Battle of Adrianople on 14 April 1205. Louis of Blois and Stephen of Perche perished in the battlefield. Baldwin was captured and died in captivity in Bulgaria.

Theodore emerged as the main beneficiary of Kaloyan's victory. The Latins' defeat revealed the fragility of their rule, and secured Theodore's position. Taking advantage of the moment, he expelled the Latin garrisons from most Anatolian fortresses, and transferred his capital from Bursa to Nicaea. Greeks were swarming to his realm from the European territories under Latin rule. Mangaphas ceded Philadelphia to Theodore, and Asidenos's lands were also absorbed into Theodore's realm. (Note: Historian Dimiter Angelov says Theodore seized Philadelphia peacefully, but Warren Treadgold writes that Theodore imprisoned Mangaphas.) The local aristocrats supported Theodore against the rebellious magnates, and he awarded them with court titles. Theodore extracted an oath of fealty from Michael I of Epirus's brother, Theodore Komnenos Doukas, who had settled in Asia Minor, before allowing him to leave for Epirus.

== Reign ==
=== Coronation ===
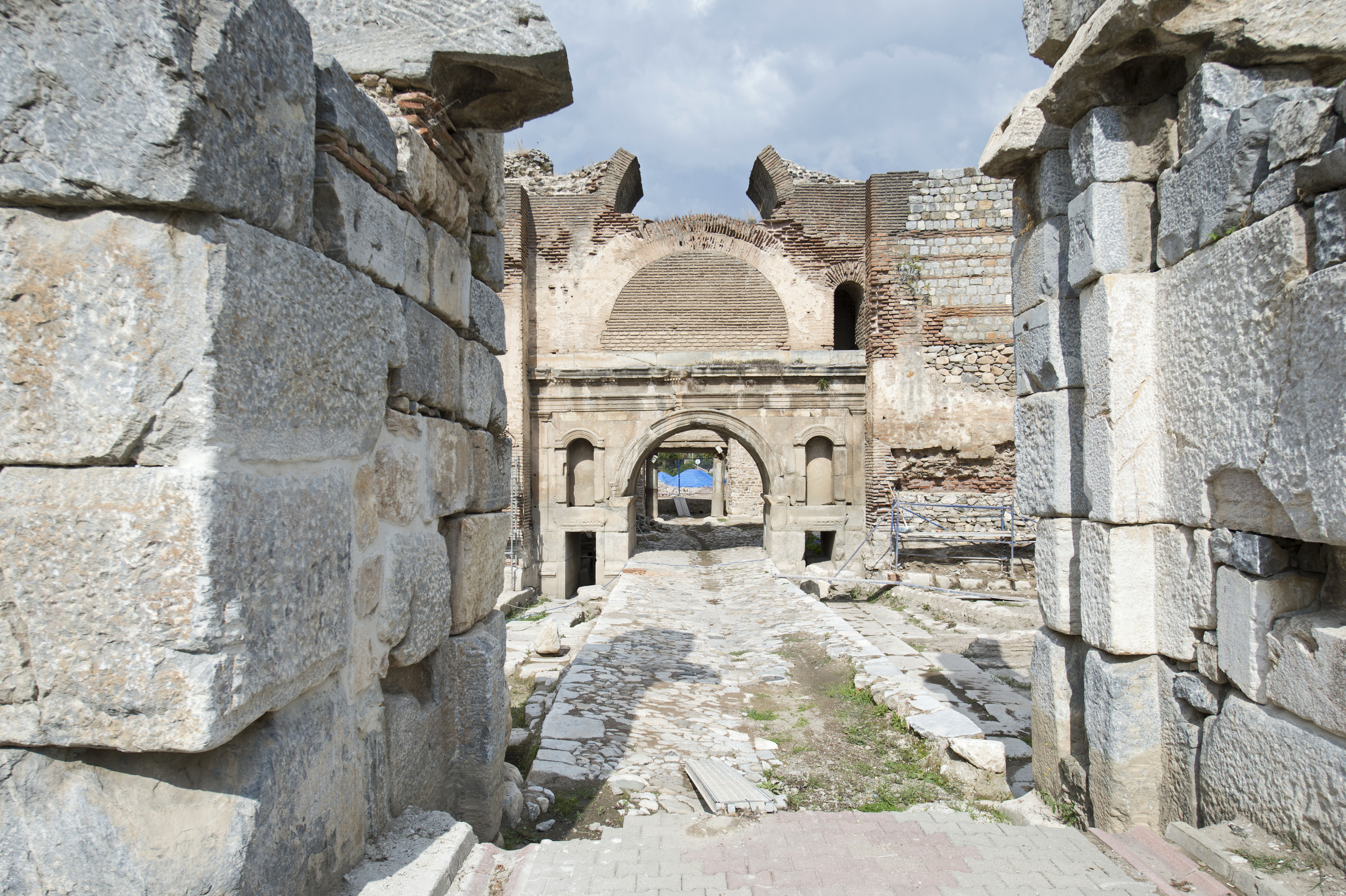
Ruins of the walls of Nicaea.

David Komnenos dispatched an army to Bithynia, but Theodore defeated the invaders and their Latin allies at Nicomedia. Sultan Kaykhusraw I sent Seljuq troops to his father-in-law, Maurozomes, to invade the valley of the Maeander River in the spring of 1205, but they were soon defeated. Theodore made a peace with Maurozomes, allowing him to rule two fortresses, Chonae and Laodicea on the Lycus, as the Sultan's lieutenant. Theodore assumed the title of emperor early in 1205—either after his victory at Nicomedia or after his peace treaty with Maurozomes. His new title was an open challenge to the legitimacy of the Latin emperor in Constantinople; therefore, the Latins regarded him as an usurper, unlawfully ruling territories of their empire. Many Greeks also refused to recognize Theodore's claim to the emperorship because only coronation by the Ecumenical Patriarch of Constantinople could legalize an emperor. Theodore approached Patriarch John Kamateros, who lived in exile in Thrace, offering to move him to Nicaea, but the elderly prelate refused.

Byzantine aristocrats, who had lost their Thracian, Thessalian or Peloponnesian estates, came to Nicaea and Theodore gave asylum to them. (Note: Members of the Raoul, Vranas, Kantakouzenos and Palaiologos families settled in Nicaea during Theodore's rule.) He could only finance a simplified state administration, but he invited former high-ranking Byzantine officials to Nicaea. His wife's uncle, the blind Basil Doukas Kamateros—a former logothetes tou dromou (minister of foreign affairs)—assisted him in setting up the new administrative system. He hired a Calabrian pirate, John Steiriones, to command his fleet in the Sea of Marmara. Theodore had great confidence in his brothers. He made them military commanders and rewarded them with court titles. (Note: Theodore rewarded Constantine with the title of despot; George, Alexios and Isaac received the rank of sebastokrator. George was also made the doux (governor) of the Thracesian Theme.)

Patriarch John Kamateros died in June 1206. The Orthodox clergy of Constantinople asked Pope Innocent III to authorize them to elect a new patriarch, but the Latin authorities opposed their plan. The new Latin Emperor of Constantinople, Henry of Flanders, made an alliance with David Komnenos against Theodore. Theodore decided to capture Heraclea Pontica from David, but the Latins attacked his army from the rear when he was marching towards the town, and he had to abandon the campaign to chase the Latin troops off. The Latins invaded Asia Minor and captured Nicomedia and Cyzicus during the winter of 1206–1207. Theodore in turn allied himself with Kaloyan, who launched an incursion into Thrace, forcing Emperor Henry to recall his troops from Asia Minor. After Theodore and his brothers had laid siege to Nicomedia, Henry agreed to sign a two-year truce, authorizing Theodore to destroy two fortifications at Nicomedia and Cyzicus.

The Orthodox clerics' negotiations with the Holy See about the appointment of an Orthodox patriarch proved unsuccessful. Theodore addressed a letter to Pope Innocent III, requesting that he authorize the Orthodox clerics to elect the new patriarch. He also tried to persuade the Pope to acknowledge him as the supreme head of the Orthodox community, but the Pope ignored both requests. When the Latins broke the truce early in 1208, Theodore again approached the Pope and asked him to mediate a peace, proposing the Sea of Marmara as the permanent frontier between the Latin Empire and his realm.

Orthodox clerics urged Theodore to hold an election to decide a new Ecumenical Patriarch. Theodore convoked a Church council in Nicaea in Holy Week 1208. The assembled prelates elected a high-ranking cleric, Michael Autoreianos, patriarch on 20 March 1208. Autoreianos was related to Theodore's chief advisor, Kamateros. As his first act, the new patriarch crowned and anointed Theodore "emperor and autocrat of the Romans". The ceremony took place on Easter Sunday (6 April). Theodore's coronation by the new Ecumenical Patriarch sanctioned his claim to be the legitimate successor of the Byzantine monarchs. His legitimacy, however, could be challenged, because only a lawful emperor could appoint a legitimate patriarch and only a legitimate patriarch could crown a lawful emperor. Theodore's opponents argued that the council electing Michael Autoreianos was just an assembly of randomly chosen bishops, not a properly convoked synod. In response, his supporters emphasized that the exceptional situation after the fall of Constantinople required a flexible interpretation of laws.

=== Wars ===
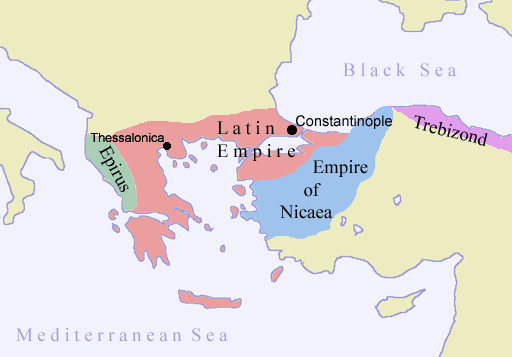
The Latin Empire and the Byzantine successor states—Nicaea, Trebizond and Epirus (the borders are uncertain).

Four realms developed from the ruins of the Byzantine Empire by 1209. Alexios I and David Komnenos consolidated their Empire of Trebizond in northern Asia Minor; Henry of Flanders integrated Thrace and almost all of Greece into the Latin Empire; Michael I Doukas secured his rule in Epirus; and Theodore I Laskaris emerged as the unrivaled ruler of western Asia Minor. The balance of power, however, remained unstable, because the four monarchs were rivals, always ready to form alliances against their neighbors. Emperor Henry concluded an alliance with Sultan Kaykhusraw I against Theodore, while Theodore allied himself with Kaloyan of Bulgaria's successor, Boril. Henry's vassal, Michael I Doukas, paid off the ransom of Theodore's father-in-law, Alexios III in 1209 or 1210. Alexios III avoided Nicaea and went to Konya, seeking asylum at the court of Kaykhusraw I, his adopted son.

Both Boril of Bulgaria and Michael I Doukas wanted to expel the Latins from Thessalonica, prompting Emperor Henry to visit the town regularly. Taking advantage of Henry's absence, Theodore sent his fleet to attack Constantinople in the spring of 1211. Boril invaded Thrace, but he could not prevent Henry from returning to his capital. Kaykhusraw I and Alexios III invaded Nicaea, forcing Theodore's troops to abandon the siege and hurry back to Asia Minor. The two armies met at Antioch on the Maeander in late spring or around 17 June. The Seljuq troops were close to winning the battle, but Theodore sought out Kaykhusraw and killed him in single combat. Alexios III was captured during the battle, and Theodore had his father-in-law imprisoned. He concluded a peace treaty with Kaykhushraw's son and successor, Kaykaus I.

Theodore sent letters to the Greeks under the Latins' rule to inform them of his triumph and to urge them to rise up against the "Latin dogs". However, he had only won a Pyrrhic victory, because his best troops—his Latin mercenaries—perished in the battlefield. Emperor Henry led his army across the Bosporus and routed Theodore's troops on the Rhyndakos River on 15 October 1211. Henry captured Nymphaion and Pergamon. In a circular letter sent to the European monarchs early in 1212, he boasted of having subjugated the Greeks as far as the Seljuq frontier, save the garrisons of some fortresses. Henry had to end his military campaign because he did not have enough troops to garrison the captured fortresses. The two emperors made peace between 1212 and 1214 (Note: Treadgold proposes the treaty was most probably concluded in 1212.) The peace confirmed the Latins' possession of the Troad region. The Latins also seized some strategically important Bithynian fortresses, (Note: Adramyttium, Achyraous, Lentiana and Poimanenon were among the fortresses seized by the Latins.) taking control of the roads between the northern and southern territories of Theodore's realm. Theodore adopted an intensive fortification program. New fortresses were built, and the old fortresses' walls were restored. He also urged local officials to settle colonists around the new forts, granting arable lands to them.

Theodore quickly recovered from his defeat. Taking advantage of a conflict between the Latin Empire and Serbia, Theodore and Sultan Kaykaus I invaded the Empire of Trebizond simultaneously in 1214. Theodore forced David Komnenos to abandon Heraclea Pontica on the Black Sea. Whether he conquered eastern Paphlagonia during this campaign, or only years later, is unclear. His conquest of the region put a narrow strip of land along the Black Sea coast under Nicaean control, and thus removed the emperors of Trebizond from the competition for Constantinople.

=== Consolidation ===
The Latin clerics wanted to compel the Orthodox population of Constantinople to adopt the Catholic liturgy and to pay the tithe, but they resisted. Pope Innocent III sent Cardinal Pelagius as his legate to Constantinople in 1213 to discipline the Orthodox population for their resistance. Pelagius closed Orthodox churches and ordered the imprisonment of the resistant monks, but the Greeks did not give in and many of them fled to Nicaea. The Greek aristocrats approached Emperor Henry, asking him either to stop the persecution of Orthodoxy or to allow them to move to Nicaea. Henry capitulated and ordered the re-opening of Orthodox churches in Constantinople. Pelagius entered into negotiations with Theodore about a possible Church union at Heraclea Pontica, but their discussions proved inconclusive.

Michael I Komnenos Doukas was assassinated in late 1214 or in 1215. Theodore Komnenos Doukas, who succeeded him, questioned Theodore Laskaris's claim to supremacy, ignoring his previous oath of fealty. In concert with Demetrios Chomatenos, the ambitious Archbishop of Ochrid, Doukas denied the right of the patriarch residing in Nicaea to appoint bishops to the Balkan episcopal sees under Epirote control. Doukas's expansionist policy forced Emperor Henry to launch a military campaign against him, but Henry died unexpectedly before reaching Epirus. The Latin barons elected his brother-in-law, Peter of Courtenay, as his successor, but he was captured and killed in Epirus during his journey towards Constantinople in 1217. After his death, his widow, Yolanda of Flanders, ruled the Latin Empire. She gave her daughter, Maria of Courtenay, in marriage to Theodore who agreed to prolong his peace treaty with the Latin Empire.

Yolande of Flanders died before October 1219. Theodore sent envoys to Constantinople to announce his claim to succeed her, but the Latin barons ignored it. Theodore proposed new negotiations about the Church union in 1219, taking advantage of the vacancy of the Latin patriarchate of Constantinople. He planned to convoke the Orthodox patriarchs of Constantinople, Antioch, Jerusalem and Alexandria to a synod in Nicaea, but the Orthodox clergy thwarted the idea. Jacopo Tiepolo, the Podestà (or head) of the Venetian community in Constantinople, convinced Theodore to spell out the Venetian merchants' privileges in a chrysobull in August 1219. The decree granted the Venetians the right to trade freely in the Empire of Nicaea and exempted them from taxation. The diploma also prohibited each party from copying or counterfeiting coins issued by the other. Theodore attempted to enforce his claim to Constantinople by force in 1220, but the Latins repelled his attack. The new Latin Emperor, Robert of Courtenay, came to Constantinople in March 1221. Peace between the two empires was soon restored.

Theodore died in November 1221. A dynastic conflict followed because his two brothers, Alexios and Isaac, and his son-in-law, John Doukas Vatatzes, claimed the throne. The conflict ended with Vatatzes's victory; Theodore's brothers were forced into exile. Theodore was buried next to his father-in-law and his first wife in the monastery of Saint Hyakinthos in Nicaea.

== Legacy ==
Western Asia Minor developed into an "empire in exile" during Theodore's reign. As the Byzantinist Warren Treadgold concludes, "Theodore had built up a functioning [Byzantine] successor state ... from next to nothing". He revived the Ecumenical Patriarchate and other fundamental Byzantine institutions. He also borrowed from the Latins and the Seljuqs—the military offices of konostaulos (a hellenization of "constable") and tzaousios (from Turkish çavuş), are first documented during his reign. He introduced his own currency, issuing electrum and billon coins, but he did not restore the Byzantine system of gold and copper coins. He levied regular taxes from 1216 at the latest. Following Byzantine patterns, he rewarded the aristocrats with tax-collecting rights. The Latins and the Venetians made treaties with him, thus acknowledging that his realm was destined to lasting existence.

The defence of the Orthodox faith was the central ideology of Theodore's realm. Niketas Choniates compiled his Treasury of Orthodoxy—a treatise against heresy—in the Nicaean court. He described the fall of Constantinople as a punishment for the Byzantines' sins and compared their exile into Asia Minor to the Israelites' Babylonian captivity. Theodore realized that he was unable to recapture Constantinople from the Latins, but located near the old Byzantine capital, Nicaea was ideally placed for its future reconquest.

Historian Dimiter Angelov emphasizes that Theodore's political success was "due, in no small part, to his sanguine and pragmatic approach". He had an itinerant court, travelling from place to place and discussing political issues with the local noblemen. He was not afraid of commanding his armies in person. He hired Latin mercenaries, offering them salaries higher than the rulers of the Latin Empire.

== Family ==
Theodore's first wife, Anna Komnene Angelina, was the second daughter of Emperor Alexios III. Her first husband, sebastokrator Isaac Komnenos Vatatzes, was a great-grandson of Emperor John II Komnenos. He died in 1196, leaving only a daughter from his wife, Theodora Angelina. Theodore and Anna had three daughters and two sons.

- Irene Laskarina was first given in marriage to the general Andronikos Palaiologos, who died without fathering children in 1212. Irene was married off to Constantine Doukas Palaiologos in 1216, but he also died childless. Irene's third husband, John III Doukas Vatatzes, succeeded Theodore on the throne.
- Maria Laskarina became the wife of King Béla IV of Hungary.
- Eudokia Laskarina's hand was offered to the Latin Emperor Robert I early in 1221, but the Orthodox patriarch's opposition prevented the marriage.
- Nicholas Laskaris was declared his father's co-emperor in 1208, but he was not mentioned after 1210.
- John Laskaris also died in childhood before 1213.

Empress Anna died before 1213 and Theodore entered into negotiations about a new marriage with a daughter of Leo I, King of Armenia. Leo I sent his niece, Philippa, to Nicaea, and Theodore married her at Christmas 1214. Historian Michael Angold proposes that Pope Innocent III promoted a marriage alliance between Theodore and Leo to secure Theodore's support in his conflict with Emperor Henry during the War of the Antiochene Succession. Theodore repudiated Philippa for an unknown reason and disinherited her son. According to Angold, Theodore was informed only after the marriage that his wife was not Leo's daughter. Her son must have been born in 1214, because he was not yet eight years old when Theodore died.

Theodore's third wife, Maria of Courtenay, was the daughter of Yolanda of Flanders and Peter II of Courtenay. Theodore married Maria in the hope of intervening in the administration of the Latin Empire late in 1218 or early in 1219.

== See also ==
- List of Byzantine emperors

== Sources ==
- Angelov, Dimiter (2019). The Byzantine Hellene: The Life of Emperor Theodore Laskaris and Byzantium in the Thirteenth Century. Cambridge University Press. ISBN 978-1-108-48071-0.
- Angold, Michael (2011). "The Latin Empire of Constantinople, 1204–1261: Marriage Strategies". Identities and Allegiances in the Eastern Mediterranean after 1204. Farnham: Ashgate Publishing Limited. pp. 47–68. ISBN 9781409410980.
- Angold, Michael (2017) [2008]. "After the Fourth Crusade: the Greek rump states and the recovery of Byzantium". In Shepard, Jonathan (ed.). The Cambridge History of the Byzantine Empire, c. 500–1492. Cambridge University Press. pp. 731–758. ISBN 9781409410980.
- Dagron, Gilbert (2003). Emperor and Priest: The Imperial Office in Byzantium. Cambridge University Press. ISBN 9780521801232.
- Fine, John V. A. (1994) [1987]. The Late Medieval Balkans: A Critical Survey from the Late Twelfth Century to the Ottoman Conquest. Ann Arbor, Michigan: University of Michigan Press. ISBN 978-0-472-10079-8.
- Head, Constance (1980). "Physical Descriptions of the Emperors in Byzantine Historical Writing". Byzantion. 50 (1): 226–240. ISSN 0378-2506.
- Korobeinikov, D. A. (2017) [2008]. "Raiders and neighbours: the Turks (1040–1304)". In Shepard, Jonathan (ed.). The Cambridge History of the Byzantine Empire, c. 500–1492. Cambridge University Press. pp. 692–727. ISBN 978-0-521-83231-1.
- Ostrogorsky, George (1956). History of the Byzantine State. Oxford: Basil Blackwell.
- Nicol, Donald M. (1988). Byzantium and Venice: A Study in Diplomatic and Cultural Relations. Cambridge: Cambridge University Press. ISBN 0-521-34157-4.
- Queller, Donald E. (1977). The Fourth Crusade: The Conquest of Constantinople 1201–1204. University of Pennsylvania Press.
- Van Tricht, Filip (2011). The Latin Renovatio of Byzantium: The Empire of Constantinople (1204–1228). Leiden: Brill. ISBN 978-90-04-20323-5.
- Treadgold, Warren (1997). A History of the Byzantine State and Society. Stanford, California: Stanford University Press. ISBN 0-8047-2630-2.
- Volkoff, Angelina Anne (2015). "Komnenian Double Surnames on Lead Seals: Problems of Methodology and Understanding". Dumbarton Oaks Papers. 69: 197–208. JSTOR 26497715.

Theodore I Laskaris Laskarid dynasty Born: c. 1175 Died: November 1221
Regnal titles
Preceded by Alexios V Doukas	Emperor of Nicaea; Claimant Byzantine Emperor; 1205–1221	Succeeded by John III Doukas Vatatzes
