= Battle of Adramyttion =

Battle of Adramyttium or Adramyttion can refer to:

- Battle of Adramyttion (1205), between the Latin Empire and the Empire of Nicaea
- Battle of Adramyttion (1334), between a Christian naval league and the Beylik of Karasi
