= Constantine Laskaris =

Possible Byzantine emperor (c.1204-5)

- Despotēs
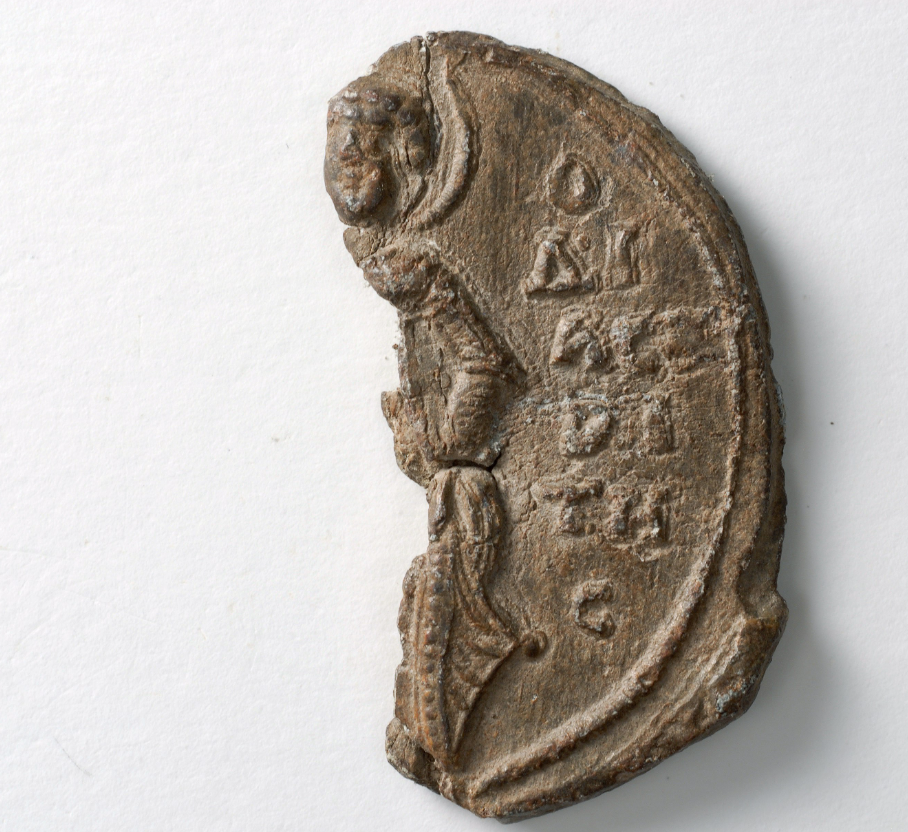
- Seal of Constantine Laskaris from an early stage in his career, at some point before 1203

Byzantine emperor (disputed)
- Reign: 12 April 1204 –?
- Coronation: 12 April 1204
- Predecessor: Alexios V Doukas
- Successor: Theodore I Laskaris

Despot of the Empire of Nicaea
- Reign: c. 1205
- Predecessor: Theodore Komnenos Laskaris (in Constantinople)
- Successor: Andronikos Palaiologos
- Emperor: Theodore I Laskaris
- Born: 1170; Constantinople (now Istanbul, Turkey)
- Died: c. 1205
- House: Laskaris
- Father: Nicholas (?) Laskaris
- Mother: ... Komnene

Constantine Laskaris (Greek: Κωνσταντίνος Κομνηνὸς Λάσκαρις, romanized: Kōnstantīnos Komnēnós Láskaris) may have been Byzantine Emperor for a few months from 1204 to early 1205. He is sometimes called "Constantine XI", a numeral now usually reserved for Constantine Palaiologos.

== Early years ==
Constantine Laskaris was born of a noble but not particularly renowned Byzantine family. Virtually nothing is known of him prior to the events of the Fourth Crusade. He found favour after his brother Theodore married into the imperial family, becoming the son-in-law of Emperor Alexios III Angelos.

During the first siege of Constantinople by the Crusaders in 1203 he was given command of the best body of troops available and led the Roman defenders on sorties against the entrenched Crusaders. None were successful in their goal of lifting the siege, and finally Constantine was ordered to attack the Burgundians who were on guard at the time.

The Romans issued forth from the city, but were soon driven back to the gates, notwithstanding the stones that the defenders on the walls threw down onto the advancing Crusaders. Constantine himself was captured whilst mounted on his horse by William of Neuilly and probably kept for ransom, which was the usual practice of the times. At some point he was released, as he was soon swept up in the events of the second siege of Constantinople in 1204.

== Elevation as Emperor ==
After the Crusaders entered Constantinople on 12 April 1204 and began to sack the city, a large body of citizens as well as what remained of the Varangian Guard gathered together in the church of Hagia Sophia to elect a new emperor, as Alexios V had fled the city.

Two nominees presented themselves – Constantine Laskaris and Constantine Doukas (probably the son of John Angelos Doukas, and thus a first cousin to Isaac II Angelos and Alexios III). Both presented their case to be nominated emperor, but the people could not decide between them, as both were young and had proven military skills. Eventually lots were cast and Laskaris was selected by what remained of the army as the next emperor.

Laskaris refused to accept the imperial purple; escorted by the Patriarch of Constantinople, John X, to the Milion, he urged the assembled populace to resist the Latin invaders with all their strength. However, the crowd was unwilling to risk their lives in such a one-sided conflict, and so he turned to the Varangians and asked for their support. Though his pleas to honour fell on deaf ears, they agreed to fight for increased wages, and he marched out to make a final stand against the Latin Crusaders. However, not even the Varangian Guard could be inspired to prolong the fight. Seeing all was lost, he quickly fled the capital with his brother, Theodore, in the early hours of 13 April 1204 and the brothers, along with a crowd of refugees, sailed to the Asian side of Bosporus.

=== Historical uncertainty of coronation ===
The primary source for the elevation of Constantine Laskaris is Niketas Choniates, an eyewitness who recounted the fall of Constantinople to the Crusaders. However, given Constantine's apparent subordinate role under his brother Theodore in 1205, historians such as Sir Steven Runciman and Donald Queller have argued that it was in fact Theodore and not Constantine who was in Hagia Sophia that fateful day, and it was Theodore who was nominated and thus succeeded Alexios V.

This uncertainty, plus the fact that Constantine remained uncrowned, means that he is not always counted among the Byzantine emperors. Therefore, the convention when it comes to Constantine Laskaris is that he is not usually assigned a numeral. If he is counted as Constantine XI, then Constantine XI Palaiologos, the last Emperor, is counted as Constantine XII.

== Career at Nicaea ==
Greek resistance to the Latin conquerors began almost immediately under the leadership of Theodore Laskaris, and he was soon joined by Constantine. They were hard pressed at first, and by early 1205 they had lost the important city of Adramyttion to the new Latin Emperor, Henry of Flanders. Theodore was keen to reverse this setback, and so he sent Constantine at the head of a large body of troops towards the city.

Henry of Flanders had advance warning of the attack via an Armenian source, and prepared his forces to meet the Greeks. The two armies fought the Battle of Adramyttion on Saturday, 19 March 1205 outside the city walls, and the result was a massive defeat for Constantine Laskaris and the Greeks, with most of the army either perishing or being captured.

Nothing more is heard of Constantine Laskaris after this battle, so it is presumed that he either perished in the defeat, or was captured.

== Family ==
Constantine had six brothers: Manuel Laskaris (died after 1256), Michael Laskaris (died 1261/1271), Georgios Laskaris, Theodore, Alexios Laskaris, and Isaac Laskaris. The last two fought with the Latin Empire against Theodore Laskaris' successor, John III Doukas Vatatzes, and were imprisoned and blinded.

According to "The Latins in the Levant. A History of Frankish Greece (1204–1566)" by William Miller, the seven brothers may also have had a sister, the wife of Marco I Sanudo and mother of Angelo Sanudo. He based this theory on his own interpretation of Italian chronicles. However, the Dictionnaire historique et Généalogique des grandes familles de Grèce, d'Albanie et de Constantinople (1983) by Mihail-Dimitri Sturdza rejected the theory based on the silence of Byzantine primary sources.

== Sources ==
- Nicol, Donald M. (1993) [1972]. The Last Centuries of Byzantium, 1261–1453 (Second ed.). Cambridge: Cambridge University Press. ISBN 978-0-521-43991-6.

Constantine Laskaris Laskarid dynasty Born: 1170 Died: 1205
Regnal titles
Preceded by Alexios V Doukas	Emperor of Nicaea; 1204	Succeeded by Theodore I Laskaris
