= Ivan Asen =

John or Ivan Asen may refer to:

- Ivan Asen I (1186–1196), ruler of Bulgaria
- Ivan Asen II (1218–1241), ruler of Bulgaria
- Ivan Asen III (1279–1280), ruler of Bulgaria
- John Komnenos Asen, ruler of Valona
- John Doukas Angelos Palaiologos Raoul Laskaris Tornikes Philanthropenos Asen, 14th or 15th-century Byzantine noble child
