= Theodore Mangaphas =

- Usurper of the Byzantine Empire
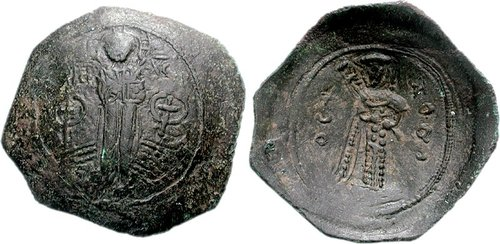
- Billon aspron trachy coin attributed to Mangaphas
- Reign: 1188–1189; 1203/1204–1205
- Died: Empire of Nicea (likely)

Theodore Mangaphas or Mankaphas (Greek: Θεόδωρος Μαγκαφᾶς, fl. c. 1188–1205) was a Greek nobleman from Philadelphia, who assumed the title of Byzantine emperor twice, first during the reign of Isaac II Angelos (r. 1185–1195 and 1203–1204), and secondly after the sacking of Constantinople during the Fourth Crusade.

He was given the sobriquet Morotheodoros (Μωροθεόδωρος) meaning "Theodore the Fool", by the Greek chroniclers after his repeated failed usurpations.

== First usurpation ==
In circa 1188, Theodore, likely already the ruler of his native Philadelphia, secured the allegiance of the larger part of the city's inhabitants, but also of the surrounding areas of Lydia and the support of the Armenian communities in the Troad. He then proclaimed himself emperor in opposition to Isaac II Angelos (r. 1185–1195 and 1203–1204), and even minted his own silver coinage. As the revolt gained ground, its progress alarmed Isaac so much that the emperor marched against Theodore in person. After some initial skirmishes, Theodore was besieged in Philadelphia (June 1189), but then Isaac learned of the rapid approach of the Holy Roman Emperor, Frederick Barbarossa (r. 1155–1190) who was on his way to take part in the Third Crusade. This made Isaac anxious to conclude the war against Theodore, and so he agreed to pardon Mangaphas, on the condition that the usurper submitted himself to Isaac and agreed to lay aside the imperial symbols and surrender hostages. He was then allowed to retain control of Philadelphia as its governor.

In circa 1193 (or possibly 1190), however, Basil Vatatzes, the doux of the Thracesian theme and megas domestikos of the Byzantine army, forced him to flee to the court of the Seljuk Turks at Iconium. There, the Sultan Ghīyāth al-Dīn Kaykhusraw (r. 1192–1196 and 1205–1211) allowed Theodore to enroll troops among the nomadic tribes, and with these bands he ravaged the frontier lands of the Byzantine Empire in 1195–1196. During which time in 1193, he sacked the church in Chonai and sold captive Christian prisoners.

In late 1196, the new emperor, Alexios III Angelos (r. 1195–1203), bought Mangaphas from the sultan, on condition that his life was to be spared, and that he would not spend the rest of his life in prison. He remained in prison for an unknown period of time before he was released (at any rate before 1204) and returned to Philadelphia.

== Second usurpation ==
In the chaos of the Fourth Crusade and the eventual fall of Constantinople in 1204, a number of individuals took advantage of the situation to proclaim themselves independent or lay claim to the vacant imperial throne. Mangaphas may have returned to Philadelphia before or after the fall of the city, and quickly re-established his dominant position there, founding an independent state in the area. After securing Philadelphia, he decided to take on Henry of Flanders, one of the Crusader chieftains and future Latin Emperor (r. 1206–1216), who was encamped at Adramyttium and who was attempting to crush the remaining Byzantine resistance in Anatolia. Although he managed to take Henry by surprise, his forces were no match for the Latin heavy cavalry and were crushed at the Battle of Adramyttium on 19 March 1205. Retreating back to Philadelphia, he remained there until his remaining territories were overrun by Theodore Laskaris of Nicaea in 1205. Nothing more is heard of him, and it is presumed that he died in captivity in the Nicaean court.

== Surname ==
Theodore's surname, Mangaphas, is not Greek, and represents perhaps a Hellenized form of the Turkish mankafa meaning fool or idiot. It is hence possible that it was not his actual surname, but a translation into Turkish of his Greek sobriquet Morotheodoros, which then was adopted by the later Greek chroniclers. There is, however, also evidence for the existence of other members of the Mangaphas family in the 11th and 13th centuries independently of Theodore. In addition, a number of silver coins found in a hoard in Aphrodisias, and which is commonly attributed to Mangaphas, seems to include "M[angaphas]" as if it were his proper surname.
