= Battle of Adramyttion (1205) =

Battle in modern-day Turkey

- Part of the Nicaean–Latin wars
Date	19 March 1205
Location	Adramyttion (modern Edremit, Turkey) 39.5976°N 27.0179°E
Result	Latin victory

Belligerents
Latin Empire	Empire of Nicaea

Commanders and leaders
Henry of Flanders; Thierry de Loos	Constantine Laskaris †; Theodore Mangaphas

The Battle of Adramyttion occurred on 19 March 1205 between the Latin Crusaders and the Byzantine Greek Empire of Nicaea, one of the kingdoms established after the fall of Constantinople to the Fourth Crusade in 1204. It resulted in a comprehensive victory for the Latins. There are two accounts of the battle, one by Geoffrey de Villehardouin, and the other by Nicetas Choniates, which differ significantly.

== Villehardouin's account ==
Henry of Flanders, brother to Emperor Baldwin I of Constantinople, was encouraged by the Armenians to make an attempt on the city of Adramyttion. He left from Abydos, after leaving a garrison in the town, and rode for two days before encamping before Adramyttion. The city soon surrendered, and Henry proceeded to occupy it, using it as a base to attack the Byzantines.

Theodore Laskaris, who had been troubled by his defeat at Battle of Poemanenum, collected as many people as he could from around Nicaea and assembled a large army. He gave the command of this force to his brother, Constantine, who was dispatched immediately to Adramyttion. Henry of Flanders had received word from the Armenians that a large Byzantine force was marching against him, so he prepared his limited forces as best he could.

On March 19, 1205, Constantine appeared before the walls of the city. Henry, refusing to remain trapped behind the walls of Adramyttion, opened the gates and rode out with his heavy cavalry. The two sides engaged in close hand-to-hand combat, with victory falling to the Franks, who killed or captured much of the Byzantine army. The Franks went on to capture a large amount of weaponry and treasure in the aftermath.

== Choniates' account ==
According to Niketas Choniates, the commander of the Byzantine forces was not Constantine Laskaris, but Theodore Mangaphas, a usurper who held the city of Philadelphia. Heartened by news of a victory against the Latins, Theodore marched against Henry who was at Adramyttion. At first he took Henry by surprise, causing him great consternation because of his large forces. Henry, convinced that he had to make a desperate attempt, drew up his cavalry in battle array, and raising their lances, they awaited the Byzantine attack. But the Byzantines were reluctant to undertake the initiative for battle, and were listless and sluggish in repulsing the cavalry charges. At a given signal, Henry leaped ahead of the others and rode his horse through the centre of their ranks, while his cavalry, couching their lances and raising the war cry, scattered the Byzantines and pressed upon them as they retreated. Large numbers of Byzantines were cut down, with their cavalry fleeing, abandoning the infantry to slaughter and captivity.

== Reconciliation of the accounts ==
Subsequent historians have attempted to address the apparent discrepancies between the two sources. Mostly they have assumed that there were two separate attempts to force Henry of Flanders out of Adramyttion, the first by Laskaris which failed, and a second attempt by Mangaphas, within a very short period of time in early 1205.
