= Alexios V Doukas =

Byzantine emperor in 1204

- Emperor and Autocrat of the Romans
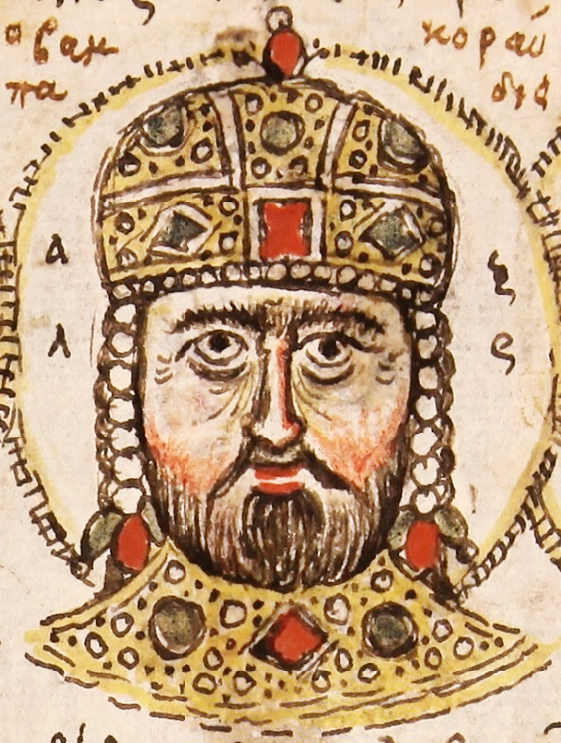
- Portrait of Alexios V from a 15th-century codex containing a copy of the Extracts of History by Joannes Zonaras

Byzantine emperor
- Reign: 27 January – 12 April 1204
- Coronation: 5 February 1204
- Predecessor: Isaac II Angelos and Alexios IV Angelos
- Successor: Constantine Laskaris (briefly?); Baldwin I (Latin Empire); Theodore I (Nicaea); Michael I (Epirus); Alexios I (Trebizond); Alexios III (Mosynopolis); Boniface I (Thessalonica); Theodore Mangaphas (Philadelphia)
- Born: c. 1140 (estimation)
- Died: December 1204 (Modern day Istanbul University)
- Spouse: Philokalina; Eudokia Angelina
- Dynasty: Angelos dynasty
- Religion: Greek Orthodox

Alexios V Doukas (Greek: Ἀλέξιος Δούκας, romanized: Aléxios Doúkās; died December 1204), Latinized as Alexius V Ducas, was Byzantine emperor from February to April 1204, just prior to the sack of Constantinople by the participants of the Fourth Crusade. His family name was Doukas, but he was also known by the nickname Mourtzouphlos or Murtzuphlus (Μούρτζουφλος), referring to either bushy, overhanging eyebrows or a sullen, gloomy character. He achieved power through a palace coup, killing his predecessors in the process. Though he made vigorous attempts to defend Constantinople from the crusader army, his military efforts proved ineffective. His actions won the support of the mass of the populace, but he alienated the elite of the city. Following the fall, sack, and occupation of the city, Alexios V was blinded by his father-in-law, the ex-emperor Alexios III, and later executed by the new Latin regime. He was the last Byzantine emperor to rule in Constantinople until the Byzantine recapture of Constantinople in 1261.

== Origins and character ==
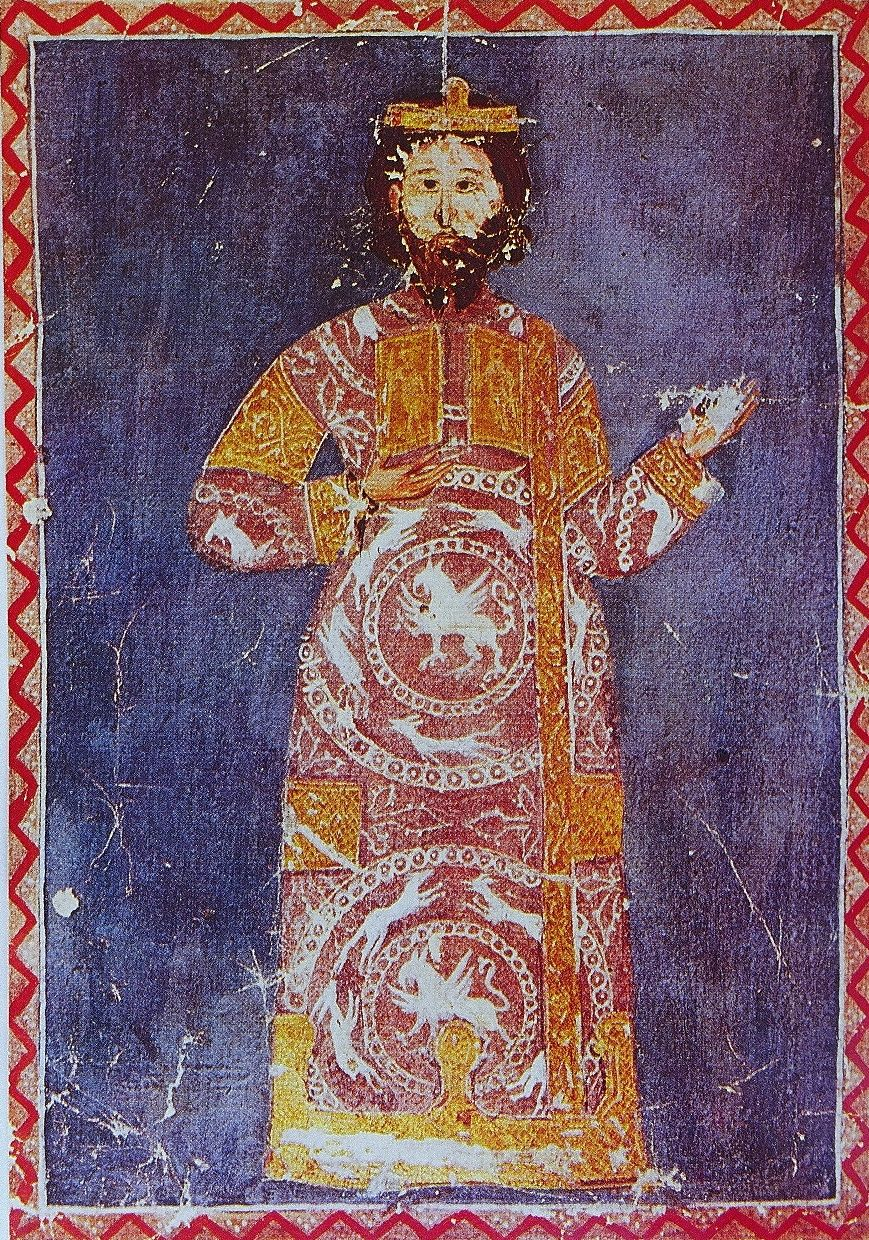
Miniature from a 13th-century chronicle of Niketas Choniates.

Though in possession of the surname used by a leading Byzantine aristocratic family, there is very little definitely known concerning the ancestry of Alexios Doukas Mourtzouphlos. The noble Doukas clan were not the only Doukai, as the surname was also employed by many families of humble origins. It has been claimed that Alexios Doukas was a great-great-grandson of the emperor Alexios I Komnenos (r. 1081–1118) in the female line (cognatic descent). This is not improbable, as all other Byzantine emperors, and the majority of attempted usurpers, of the period had a connection with the former imperial house of the Komnenoi, either by descent or marriage. A more precise theory has been proposed, that he was the son of an Isaac Doukas, and was the second cousin of Alexios IV Angelos (r. 1203–1204). His date of birth is also unknown, but it is sometimes given as c. 1140 because he was considered "old" in 1204. A letter sent to Pope Innocent III, stated that Alexios Doukas Mourtzouphlos was 'a blood relation' of Alexios IV Angelos.

The contemporary historian Niketas Choniates was dismissed from office as logothete of the sekreta by Mourtzouphlos. His assessment of the emperor's character might therefore be biased; however, Choniates allows that he was extremely clever by nature, though arrogant in his manner and lecherous.

== Political intrigues and usurpation ==
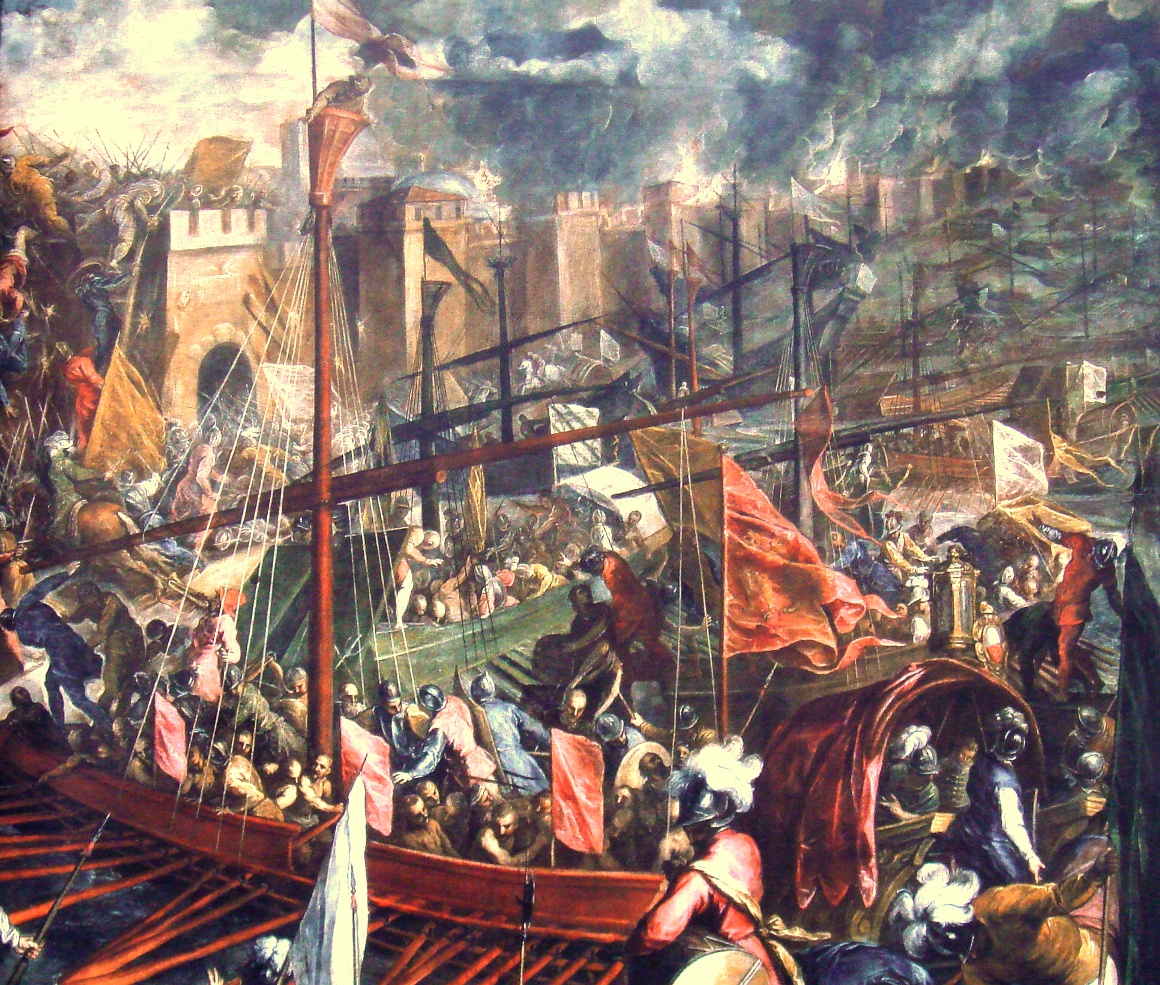
The siege of Constantinople in 1204, by Palma il Giovane

The participation of Alexios Doukas Mourtzouphlos in the attempted overthrow of Alexios III Angelos (r. 1195–1203) by John Komnenos the Fat in 1200 had led to his imprisonment. Mourtzouphlos was probably imprisoned from 1201 until the restoration to the throne of Isaac II Angelos (r. 1185–1195, 1203–1204), the brother and predecessor of Alexios III. Isaac II, along with his son Alexios IV Angelos, were restored to the throne through the intervention of the leaders of the Fourth Crusade in July 1203. On release, Mourtzouphlos was invested with the court position of protovestiarios (head of the imperial finances). He had been married twice but was allegedly the lover of Eudokia Angelina, a daughter of Alexios III.

By the beginning of 1204, Isaac II and Alexios IV had inspired little confidence among the people of Constantinople with their efforts to protect the city from the Latin crusaders and their Venetian allies, and the citizens were becoming restless. The crusaders were also losing patience with the emperors; they rioted and set fires in the city when the money and aid promised by Alexios IV was not forthcoming. The fires affected about a sixth of the area of Constantinople and may have made up to a third of the population homeless; the dislocation and desperation of those affected eventually sapped the will of the people to resist the crusaders. Alexios Doukas Mourtzouphlos emerged as a leader of the anti-Latin movement in the city. He won the approval of the populace by his valour in leading an attack on the Latins at "Trypetos Lithos"; in this clash his mount stumbled and he would have been killed or captured had a band of youthful archers from the city not defended him. Mourtzouphlos exploited the hatred of the people for the Latins to serve his personal ambition.

The citizens of Constantinople rebelled in late January 1204, and in the chaos an otherwise obscure nobleman named Nicholas Kanabos was acclaimed emperor, though he was unwilling to accept the crown. The two co-emperors barricaded themselves in the Palace of Blachernae and entrusted Mourtzouphlos with a mission to seek help from the crusaders, or at least they informed him of their intentions. Instead of contacting the crusaders, Mourtzouphlos, on the night of 28–29 January 1204, used his access to the palace to bribe the "ax-bearers" (the Varangian Guard), and with their backing arrest the emperors. Choniates states that Mourtzouphlos, when bribing the guards, had the help of a eunuch with access to the imperial treasury. The support of the Varangians seems to have been of major importance in the success of the coup, though Mourtzouphlos also had help from his relations and associates. The young Alexios IV was eventually strangled in prison; while his father Isaac, both enfeebled and blind, died at around the time of the coup, his death variously attributed to fright, sorrow, or mistreatment. Kanabos was initially spared and offered an office under Alexios V, but he refused both this and a further summons from the emperor and took sanctuary in the Hagia Sophia; he was forcibly removed and killed on the steps of the cathedral.

== Emperor ==
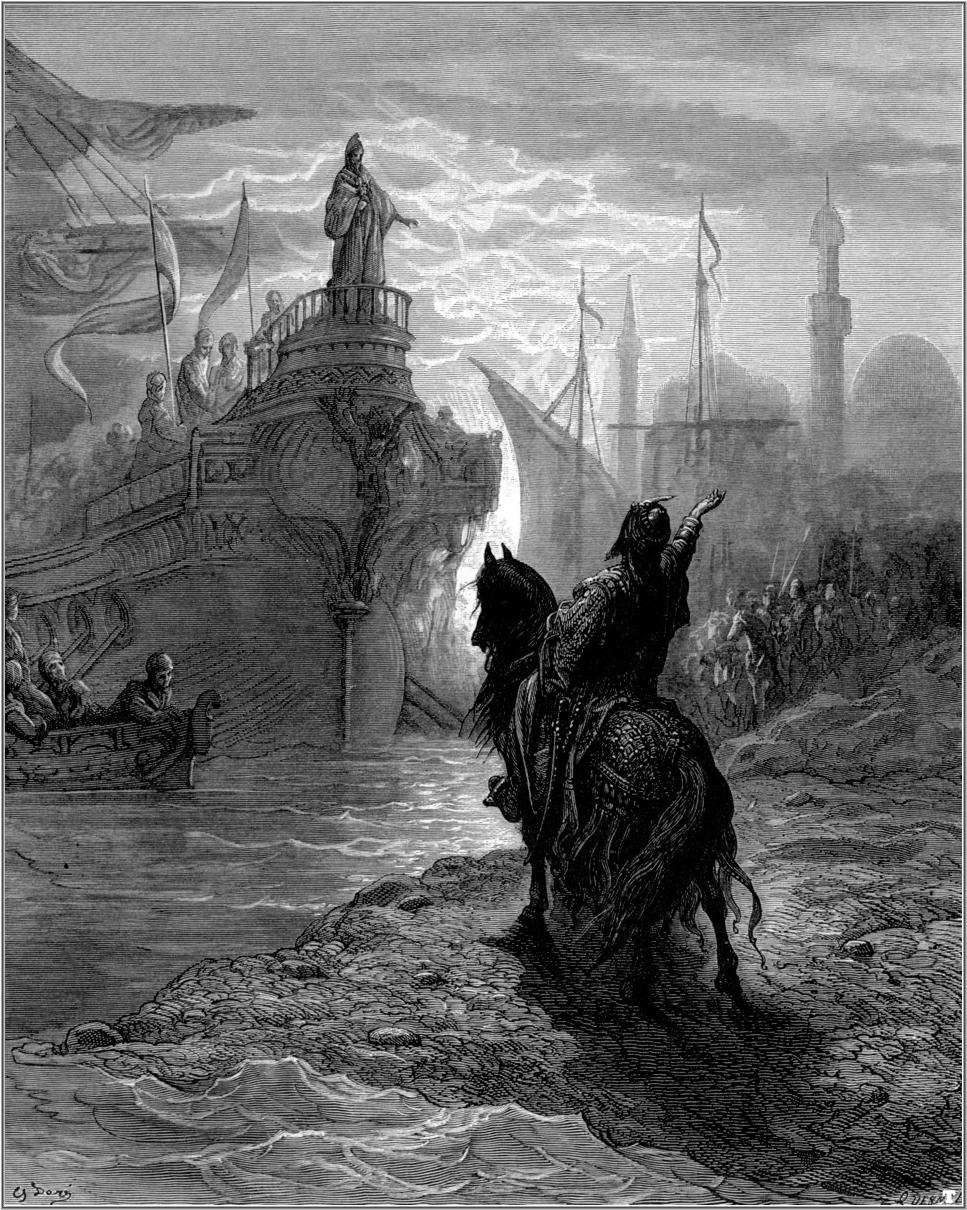
Alexios V negotiating with Doge Enrico Dandolo, by Gustave Doré

The timing of the deaths of the deposed emperors and of Kanabos, and their relation to the coronation of Alexios V are problematic. Alexios V appears to have been acclaimed emperor as early as the night he moved against the Angeloi co-emperors, on 27 January. He was crowned soon after, on or around 5 February.

Finding the treasury empty, the new emperor confiscated money from the aristocracy and high officials to be put to public use. These actions endeared Alexios V to the citizens, but alienated his relations and other prominent supporters. Once in firm control, Alexios V closed the gates of the city to the crusaders and strengthened the fortifications. Sword in hand, he was active in leading attacks on sorties made by the crusaders in search of supplies. On 2 February, Henry of Flanders led a part of the crusader army to Filea (or Phileas), in order to obtain food supplies. As he returned towards Constantinople, Alexios V attacked his rearguard. The Byzantines were defeated, the imperial standard and an important icon of the Virgin (the Panagia Nikopoios) were captured. The Byzantines lost some of their best soldiers in the clash, and Alexios V was lucky to escape alive. At about this time Alexios V attempted to destroy the crusader fleet with fire-ships, but to little effect.

The loss of the icon, traditionally seen as a physical embodiment of divine protection for the city, was a severe psychological blow. Its possession by the crusaders convinced many of the population of Constantinople that the victory of the Westerners was now divinely sanctioned, as a punishment for the sins of the Byzantines.

Around 8 February, Alexios V met the Doge of Venice, Enrico Dandolo, for peace talks. The conditions demanded by the Venetian, however, were too harsh for the Byzantines to consider. Choniates states that the meeting was brought to a close by a sudden attack by crusader cavalry on Alexios V and his entourage, the emperor narrowly escaping capture. Alexios IV was probably killed the same day; the insistence by the crusaders that he be restored to the throne may have precipitated his death. When news of the death of Alexios IV reached the crusaders, relations between them and Alexios V deteriorated further. The forcible expulsion of all Latins resident in Constantinople in March seems to have been the tipping point which led the crusaders to begin actively negotiating amongst themselves regarding the partition of the Byzantine Empire. They also began to prepare for their final assault on the city, which took place the following month.

== The fall of Constantinople, flight and death ==
The defenders of Constantinople held out against a crusader assault on 9 April. The crusaders' second attack three days later, however, proved too strong to repel. Breaking through the walls near the Petria Gate, the crusaders entered the city and looted the Blachernae Palace. Alexios V attempted to rally the people to the defence of the city, but with no success. Alexios V then boarded a fishing boat and fled the city towards Thrace on the night of 12 April 1204, accompanied by Eudokia Angelina and her mother Euphrosyne Doukaina Kamatera. In the Hagia Sophia Constantine Laskaris was acclaimed as emperor, but being unable to persuade the Varangians to continue the fight, in the early hours of 13 April he also fled, leaving Constantinople under crusader control.

Alexios V and his companions eventually reached Mosynopolis, which had been occupied by the deposed emperor Alexios III Angelos and his followers. At first they were well received, with Alexios V marrying Eudokia Angelina. Later, however, Alexios III arranged for his new son-in-law to be made captive and blinded, thereby rendering him ineligible for the imperial throne. Having been abandoned by both his supporters and his father-in-law, Alexios V was captured near Mosynopolis, or possibly in Anatolia, by the advancing Latins under Thierry de Loos in November 1204. On his return to Constantinople as a prisoner, Alexios V was tried for treason against Alexios IV. In his trial the blind ex-emperor argued that it was Alexios IV who had committed treason to his country, through his intention to invite the crusaders to enter Constantinople in force. On being condemned, he was executed by novel means: he was thrown to his death from the top of the Column of Theodosius.

The new, alien, Latin regime of conquerors in Constantinople may have viewed the public trial and execution of the man who murdered the last "legitimate emperor" as a way to cast an aura of legitimacy on themselves. Alexios V was the last Byzantine emperor to reign in Constantinople before the establishment of the Latin Empire, which controlled the city for the next 57 years, until it was recovered by the Nicaean Emperor Michael VIII Palaiologos in 1261.

== See also ==
- List of Byzantine emperors
- Sack of Constantinople (1204)

== Bibliography ==
- Akropolites, G. The History, trans. Ruth Macrides (2007) Oxford University Press ISBN 9780199210671
- Choniates, Nicetas (1984). O City of Byzantium, Annals of Niketas Choniatēs. Translated by Harry J. Magoulias. Detroit: Wayne State University Press. ISBN 0-8143-1764-2.
- Falk, A. (2010) Franks and Saracens: Reality and Fantasy in the Crusades, Karnac Books ISBN 9781855757332
- Giarenis, I. (2017) "The Crisis of the Fourth Crusade in Byzantium (1203–1204) and the Emergence of Networks for Anti-Latin Reaction and Political Action", Mediterranean World, 23, pp. 73–80. ISSN 1343-9626
- Head, C. (1980) "Physical Descriptions of the Emperors in Byzantine Historical Writing", Byzantion, Vol. 50, No. 1 (1980), Peeters Publishers, pp. 226–240
- Hendrickx, B. and Matzukis, C. (1979) "Alexios V Doukas Mourtzouphlos: His Life, Reign and Death (?–1204)", in Hellenika (Έλληνικά) 31: 111–117
- Madden, T.F. (1992) "The Fires of the Fourth Crusade in Constantinople, 1203–1204: A Damage Assessment", Byzantinische Zeitschrift, lxxxiv–v, pp. 72–93.
- Madden, T.F. (1995) "Outside and Inside the Fourth Crusade", The International History Review, Vol. 17, No. 4 (Nov., 1995), Taylor and Francis, pp. 726–743
- Runciman, Steven (1987) [1954]. A History of the Crusades, Volume III: The Kingdom of Acre and the Later Crusades. Vol. 3. Cambridge: Cambridge University Press. ISBN 0-14-013705-X.

Alexios V Doukas Angelid dynasty Born: unknown Died: December 1204
Regnal titles
Preceded by Isaac II Angelos and Alexios IV Angelos	Byzantine emperor 1204	Succeeded by Theodore I Laskaris as Emperor of Nicaea
Preceded by Isaac II Angelos and Alexios IV Angelos	Byzantine emperor 1204	Succeeded by Michael I Komnenos Doukas as Ruler of Epirus
Preceded by Isaac II Angelos and Alexios IV Angelos	Byzantine emperor 1204	Succeeded by Alexios I Megas Komnenos as Emperor of Trebizond
Preceded by Isaac II Angelos and Alexios IV Angelos	Byzantine emperor 1204	Succeeded by Baldwin I as Latin Emperor of Constantinople
