= Siege of Constantinople (1203) =

1203 siege of Constantinople by a Crusader-Venetian alliance

Coordinates: 41.0167°N 28.9769°E

- Part of the Fourth Crusade
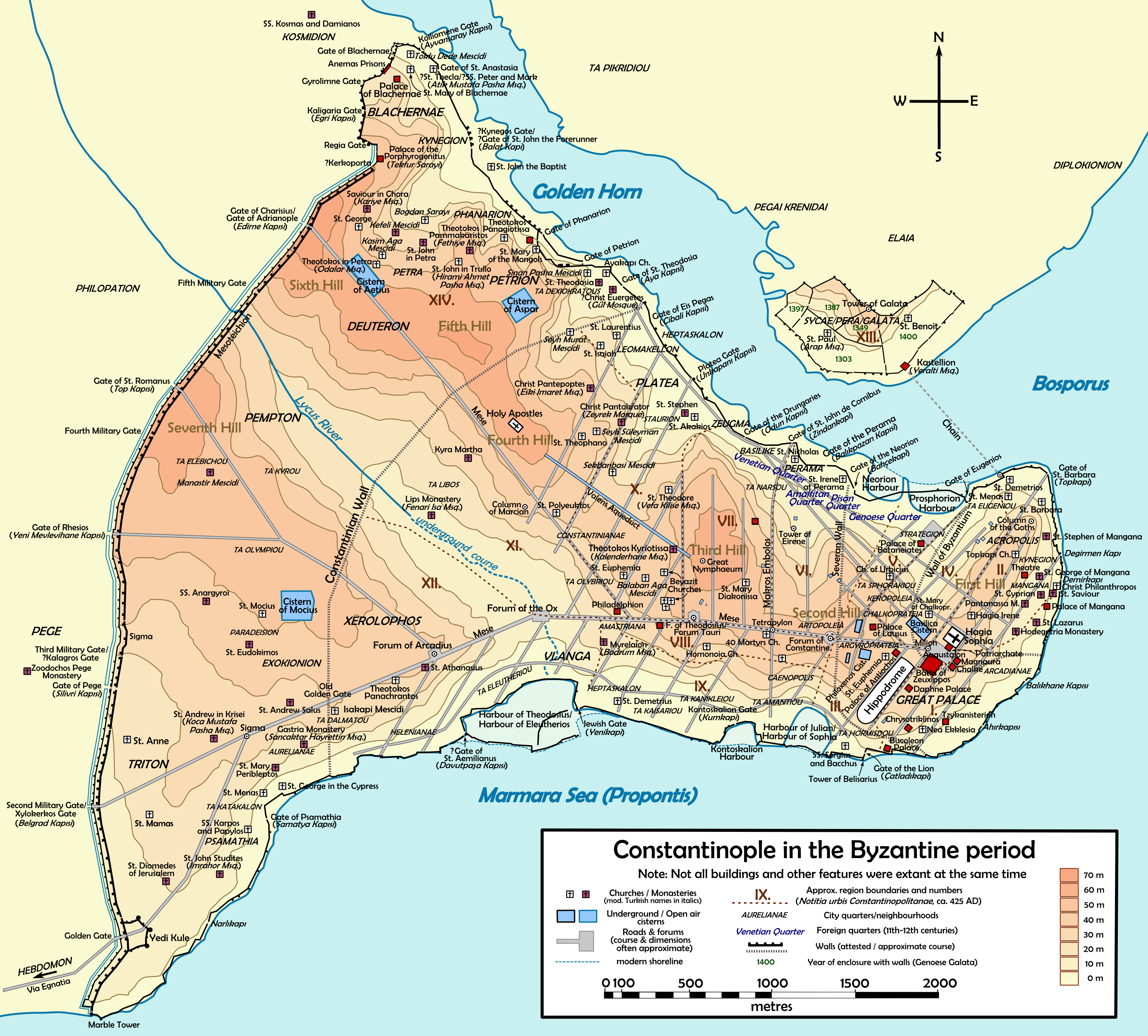
- Map of Constantinople during the Byzantine era
Date	11 July – 1 August 1203
Location	Constantinople, Byzantine Empire (modern-day Istanbul, Turkey)
Result	Crusader victory; Alexios IV Angelos takes Byzantine throne

Belligerents
Fourth Crusade loyalist of Alexios IV Angelos	Byzantine Empire

Commanders and leaders
Boniface I Enrico Dandolo	Alexios III Angelos

Strength
Crusaders: 10,000 men Venetians: 10,000 men and 210 ships	15,000 men and 20 ships

The siege of Constantinople in 1203 was a crucial episode of the Fourth Crusade, marking the beginning of a series of events that would ultimately lead to the fall of the Byzantine capital. The crusaders, diverted from their original mission to reclaim Jerusalem, found themselves in Constantinople, in support of the deposed emperor Isaac II Angelos and his son Alexios IV Angelos. The besieging forces, primarily composed of Western European knights faced initial setbacks, but their determination and advanced siege weaponry played a pivotal role in pressuring the Byzantine defenders.

Amidst the chaos, the Byzantine emperor was overthrown, leading to a power vacuum and setting the stage for the more infamous events of 1204 when the crusaders, frustrated by unpaid debts and political turmoil, eventually sacked the city. This marked the first time in nearly nine centuries that Constantinople fell to an external force, forever altering the course of Byzantine history.

== Siege ==
To take the city by force, the Crusaders first needed to cross the Bosphorus. About 200 ships, horse transports and galleys would undertake to deliver the crusading army across the narrow strait, where Alexios III had lined up the Byzantine army in battle formation along the shore, north of the suburb of Galata. The Crusaders' knights charged straight out of the horse transports, and the Byzantine army fled south. The Crusaders followed south, and attacked the Tower of Galata, which held one end of the chain that blocked access to the Golden Horn. The Tower of Galata held a garrison of mercenary troops of English, Danish, and Italian origin. As the crusaders laid siege to the Tower, the defenders routinely attempted to sally out with some limited success, but often suffered bloody losses. On one occasion the defenders sallied out but were unable to retreat back to the safety of the tower in time, the Crusader forces viciously counterattacked, with most of the defenders being cut down or drowning in the Bosporus in their attempts to escape. The Golden Horn now lay open to the Crusaders, and the Venetian fleet entered.

On 11 July the Crusaders took positions opposite the Blachernae palace on the northwest corner of the city. Alexios IV was paraded outside the walls, but the citizens were apathetic, as Alexios III, though a usurper and illegitimate in the eyes of the westerners, was an acceptable emperor for the Byzantine citizens. The siege began in earnest on 17 July, with four divisions attacking the land walls, while the Venetian fleet attacked the sea walls from the Golden Horn. The Venetians took a section of the wall of about 25 towers, while the Varangian Guard held off the Crusaders on the land wall. The Varangians shifted to meet the new threat, and the Venetians retreated under the screen of fire. The fire lasted for 3 days and destroyed about 440 acres (1.8 km^{2}) of the city, leaving 20,000 people homeless.

Alexios III finally took offensive action, and led 17 divisions from the St. Romanus Gate, vastly outnumbering the Crusaders. Alexios III's army of about 8,500 men faced the Crusader's 7 divisions (about 3,500 men), but (according to Choniates and the Latins) his courage failed, and the Byzantine army returned to the city without a fight.

On 18 July 1203 the Crusaders launched an assault on the city, and Alexios III immediately fled into Thrace. The next morning, the Crusaders were surprised to find that the citizens had released Isaac II from prison and proclaimed him emperor, despite the fact that he had been blinded to make him ineligible to rule. The Crusaders forced Isaac II to proclaim his son Alexios IV co-emperor on 1 August, effectively ending the siege.

== After the 1203 siege ==
Following the end of the first siege of Constantinople in 1203, on 1 August 1203, the pro-Crusader Alexios Angelos was crowned Emperor Alexios IV of the Byzantine Empire, who then tried to stabilize the city. But riots between anti-Crusader Greeks and pro-Crusader Latins broke out later that month and lasted until November, during which most of the populace began to turn against Emperor Alexios IV.

On 25 January 1204, the death of co-Emperor Isaac II set off rioting in Constantinople in which the people deposed Alexios IV, who turned to the Crusaders for help but was imprisoned by the imperial chamberlain, Alexios Doukas, who declared himself Emperor Alexios V on 5 February. Emperor Alexios V then attempted to negotiate with the Crusaders for a withdrawal from Byzantine territory, but they refused to abandon their old treaty with Alexios IV. When Alexios V ordered Alexios IV's execution on 8 February, the Crusaders declared war on Alexios V. In March 1204, the Crusader and Venetian leadership decided on the outright conquest of Constantinople, and drew up a formal agreement to divide the Byzantine Empire between them. By the end of that month, the combined Crusader armies had begun the 1204 siege of Constantinople as Emperor Alexios V began to strengthen the city's defences while conducting more active operations outside the city.

== See also ==
- Siege of Constantinople (1204)
- Siege of Constantinople (1235)
