= John Doukas Angelos Palaiologos Raoul Laskaris Tornikes Philanthropenos Asen =

John Doukas Angelos Palaiologos Raoul Laskaris Tornikes Philanthropenos Asen (Greek: Ἰωάννης Δούκας Ἄγγελος Παλαιολόγος Ῥαοὺλ Λάσκαρις Τορνίτζης Φιλανθρωπηνός Ἀσάνης) was a 14th- or 15th-century Byzantine noble child who died young.

John Asen is known from a funerary icon portrait in a monastery in the Peloponnese. A relative of an unnamed Byzantine empress consort, he is notable for his unusual amount of family names, indicating direct descent from as many as eight prominent Byzantine noble houses: the Doukas, Angelos, Palaiologos, Raoul, Laskaris, Tornikes, Philanthropenos and Asen families.

== Icon portrait ==
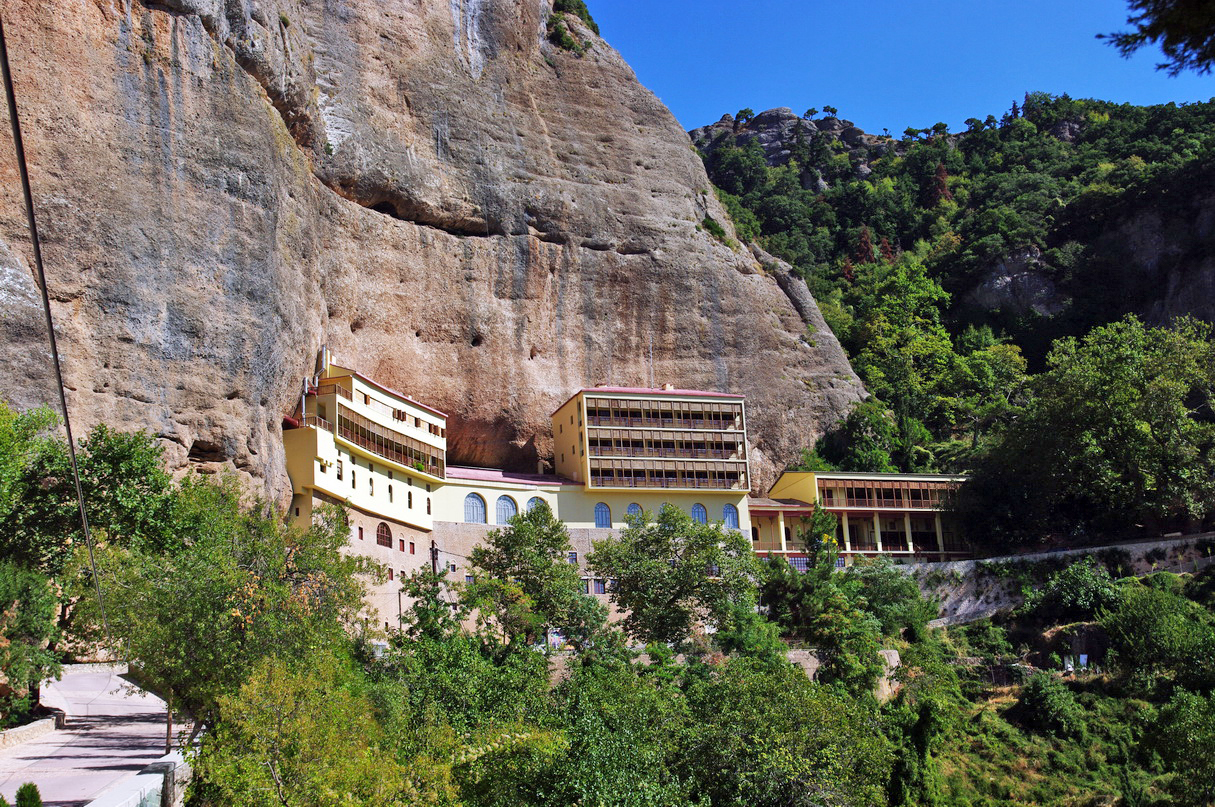
The Mega Spelaion monastery in the Peloponnese, where John Asen's portrait was discovered

A funerary icon featuring a portrait of John Asen was discovered in the early 20th century in the Mega Spelaion monastery's main church near Kalavryta in the Peloponnese, modern Greece. The icon was lost in a fire in 1934, but has been preserved in a photograph.

The portrait measures 1 by 0.56 metres (3.3 by 1.8 feet) and depicts a child next to an image of the Mother of God (Theotokos) and the infant Jesus Christ. John Asen is painted with a pale face and dark red hair, wearing a chlamys cloak decorated with double-headed eagles, circles and dragons. The infant Christ is shown blessing the child, whose pale and flat facial features in comparison to Jesus and the Theotokos are an indication that John Asen is dead.

John Asen's portrait was accompanied by an epigram (no less than twelve lines long), which was originally inscribed on the icon's frame, but was later copied to the icon itself. The epigram mourns the child's death and compares him to a "flower cut down before its time".

== Identification ==
A partially preserved inscription above the portrait reveals the unusually long name of the boy and his relation to an unnamed Byzantine empress consort. The letters had become almost illegible by the mid-19th century, when a local artist restored them—as the historian Demetrios Polemis comments, "one cannot tell how accurately".

Greek archaeologist G. Sotiriou identified the empress with Helena Dragaš, wife of Emperor Manuel II Palaiologos. On the basis of Sotiriou's research and the available evidence, Bulgarian historian Ivan Bozhilov concludes that John Asen's ancestry must be linked to the last rulers of the Despotate of the Morea. Bozhilov considers it most likely that he was a son of Despot Demetrios Palaiologos and his third wife Theodora Asanina. Yet he does not exclude the possibility that he was a son of Demetrios' younger brother, Despot Thomas Palaiologos, and his wife Catherine Zaccaria.

If the latter identification is to be accepted, Bozhilov puts John Asen's birth at no earlier than 1444 and his death before 1449, when Demetrios Palaiologos ruled on Lemnos. He also dates the boy's portrait to after 1449, when Demetrios received half of the Morea as his possession from Emperor Constantine XI Palaiologos, including Kalavryta and the Mega Spelaion monastery.

A later theory has ascribed John Asen to the mid-14th century. Titos Papamastorakis considers him a son of Despot Manuel Komnenos Raoul Asen, a military commander who was a brother of Irene Asanina, wife of Emperor John VI Kantakouzenos.

== Name ==
British historian Michael Angold considers John Asen's eight family names to exemplify "best of all" the importance of names in indicating noble status in Byzantine society. Fellow Byzantinist Dionysios Stathakopoulos agrees that John Asen's name was "less an instrument of identification than a manifesto of social association".

Angold considers the order of eponyms in John Asen's name to be obscure. On the other hand, Bozhilov believes that the Asen name is the main one due to its final position, interpreting it as an "impressive manifestation of [the] marriage policy" of the Second Bulgarian Empire's royal dynasty. Bozhilov also acknowledges that the amount of noble family names John Asen carries is "truly unusual".
