= Nicholas Kanabos =

Nicholas Kanabos Νικόλαος Καναβός

Emperor-elect of the Byzantine Empire
- Reign: 27 January – 2 February 1204
- Predecessor: Isaac II and Alexios IV
- Successor: Alexios V
- Born: late 12th century
- Died: c. 5 February 1204; Hagia Sophia, Constantinople
- Spouse: Unnamed wife
- Religion: Greek Orthodox

Nicholas Kanabos (Greek: Νικόλαος Καναβός, romanized: Nikólaos Kanabós; died February 1204) was briefly an Emperor-elect of the Byzantine Empire in February 1204, although he himself never accepted the title.

== Biography ==
Nicholas was elected Byzantine emperor during the Fourth Crusade on 27 January 1204 by an assembly of the Byzantine Senate, priests, and the mob of Constantinople in direct opposition to co-emperors Isaac II and Alexios IV. Nicholas was a young noble who was chosen after three days of sorting through several unwilling candidates and refused to assume the lofty position. Though popularly chosen, he never accepted imperial power, and took sanctuary in the bowels of Hagia Sophia. Alexios V Doukas, who had deposed emperors Isaac II and Alexios IV, offered Nicholas a prominent position in his own administration. Nicholas's supporters initially denounced the attempt to remove him from imperial power; however, as Alexios grew more popular, Nicholas's support began to collapse. Alexios arrested and imprisoned Nicholas and his wife without significant resistance. Nicholas was ultimately executed by strangulation a few days later, possibly on 5 February, the same day as Alexios' coronation.

The contemporary historian Niketas Choniates described Nicholas Kanabos as a man "gentle by nature, of keen intelligence, and versed in generalship and war". According to the Novgorod Chronicle, he "reigned" for six days and six nights.

== Sources ==
- Choniates, Niketas (1984) [1207]. Annals of Niketas Choniates. Translated by Harry J. Magoulias. Wayne State University Press.
- Savignac, David (2020). "The Medieval Russian Account of the Fourth Crusade - A New Annotated Translation". (Novgorod Chronicle)
- Cheynet, Jean-Claude (1990). Pouvoir et contestations à Byzance (963–1210). p. 142.
