= Sack of Constantinople =

1204 conquest during the Fourth Crusade

- Part of the Fourth Crusade
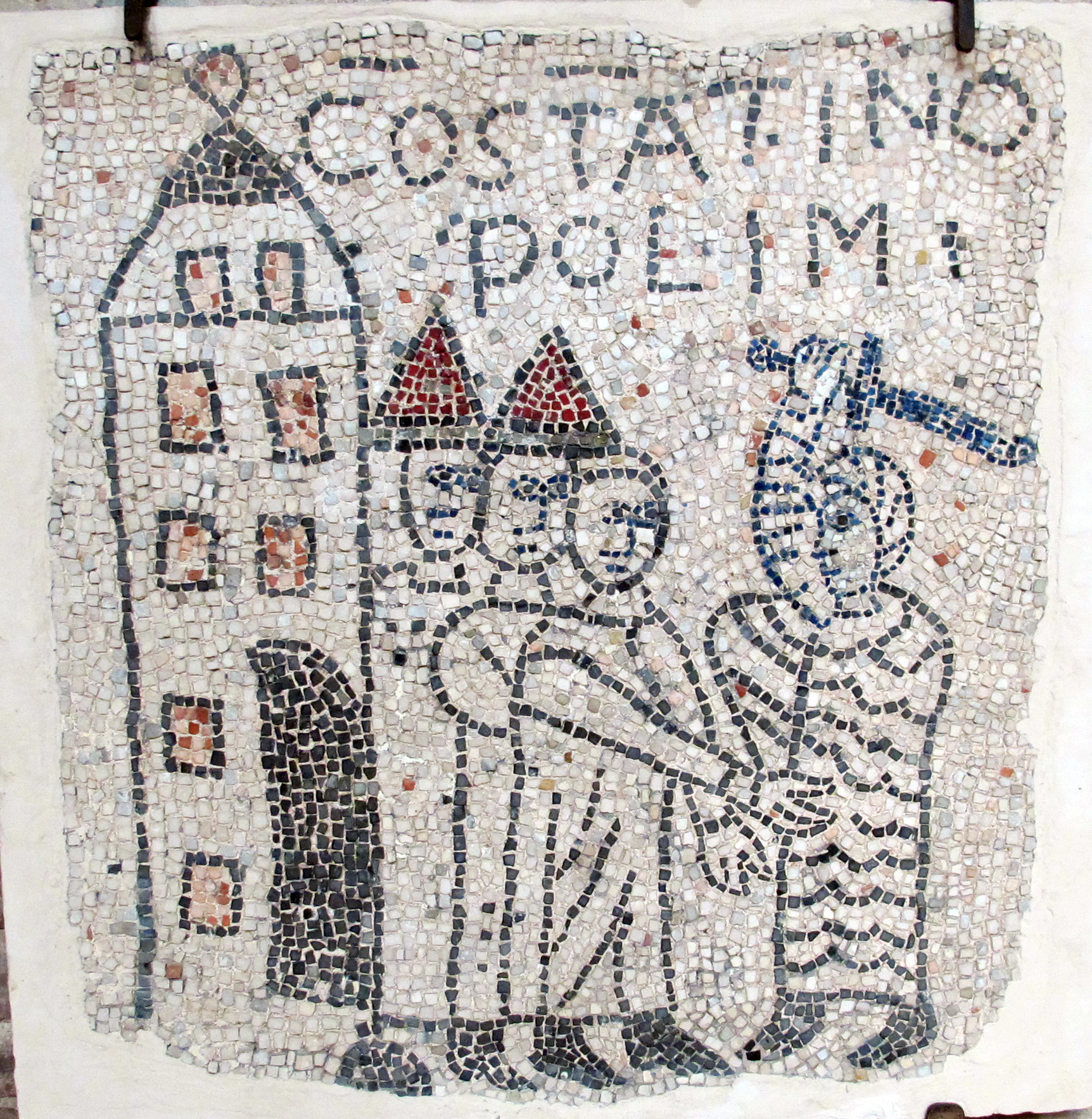
- Venetian mosaic in the San Giovanni Evangelista depicting the fall of Constantinople, made in 1213
Date	12–15 April 1204
Location	Constantinople, Byzantine Empire (modern-day Istanbul, Turkey) 41°02′15″N 28°56′42″E
Result	Crusader victory
Territorial changes	Capture and sack of Constantinople by the Crusaders; Establishment of the Latin Empire; Beginning of the struggle for Constantinople

Belligerents
Crusaders; Republic of Venice	Byzantine Empire; Varangian Guard; Genoese; Pisans

Commanders and leaders
Boniface I Enrico Dandolo	Alexios V Doukas

Strength
22,000; 60 war galleys and 150 transports	15,000; 20 war galleys

Casualties and losses
- 2,000 Byzantine civilians killed by Crusaders

The sack of Constantinople occurred in April 1204 and marked the culmination of the Fourth Crusade. Crusaders sacked and destroyed most of Constantinople, the capital of the Byzantine Empire. After the capture of the city, the Latin Empire (known to the Byzantines as the Frankokratia, or the Latin occupation) was established and Baldwin IX of Flanders crowned emperor in Hagia Sophia.

After the city's sacking, most of the Byzantine Empire's territories were divided up among the Crusaders. Byzantine aristocrats also established a number of small independent splinter states—one of them being the Empire of Nicaea, which eventually recaptured Constantinople in 1261 and proclaimed the reinstatement of the Empire. However, the restored Empire never managed to reclaim all its former territory or attain its earlier economic strength, and it gradually succumbed to the rising Ottoman Empire over the following two centuries.

The Byzantine Empire was left poorer, smaller, and ultimately less able to defend itself against the Seljuk and Ottoman conquests that followed. The actions of the Crusaders, therefore, accelerated the collapse of Christendom in the east, and in the long run helped facilitate the later Ottoman conquests of southeastern Europe.

The sack of Constantinople is considered a turning point in medieval history. Reports of Crusader looting and brutality horrified the Orthodox world; relations between the Catholic and Orthodox churches were wounded for many centuries afterwards.

== Background ==
Venetian merchants had carefully mapped Constantinople's harbours years before the sack, possibly anticipating its economic potential.

Alexios IV Angelos, the son of deposed emperor Isaac II Angelos persuaded Boniface of Montferrat and the Venetians to help him reinstate his father and make him co-emperor of the Byzantines by diverting the Fourth Crusade to Constantinople. In return, he promised 200,000 marks of silver as payment, as well as the submission of the Eastern Orthodox Church to Rome. Additionally he promised to pay for the provisions of the expedition and to join the crusade against the Saracens.

Following the siege of Constantinople in 1203, on 1 August 1203 the pro-Crusader Alexios Angelos was crowned Emperor Alexios IV of the Byzantine Empire. He attempted to pacify the city, but riots between anti-Crusader Greeks and pro-Crusader Latins broke out later that month and lasted until November, during which time most of the populace began to turn against him.

On 25 January 1204, the death of co-Emperor Isaac II set off rioting in Constantinople in which the people deposed Alexios IV. He turned to the Crusaders for help, but was imprisoned by the imperial chamberlain, Alexios Doukas, who declared himself Emperor on 5 February, before executing Alexios IV by strangulation on 8 February. Alexios V then attempted to negotiate with the Crusaders for a withdrawal from Byzantine territory without payment, but they refused in order to avenge Alexios IV and receive the money that was promised. In March 1204, the Crusader and Venetian leadership decided on the outright conquest of Constantinople in order to settle debts, and drew up a formal agreement to divide the Byzantine Empire between them.

== Siege: first assault ==
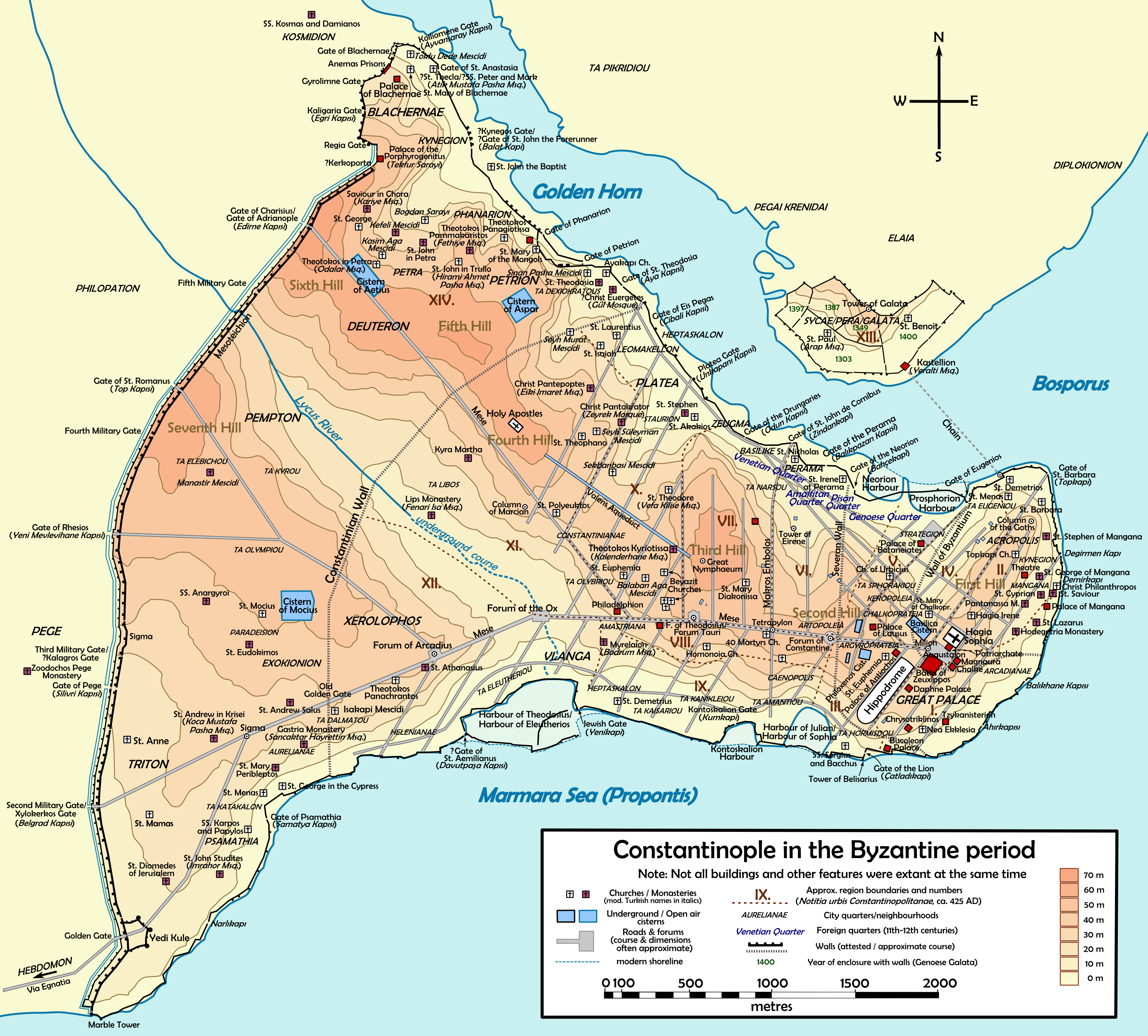
Constantinople and its walls during the 12th century

By the end of March, the combined Crusader armies were besieging Constantinople as Emperor Alexios V began to strengthen the city's defences while conducting more active operations outside the city. By the first week of April, the Crusaders had begun their siege from their encampment in the town of Galata across the Golden Horn from Constantinople.

On 9 April 1204, the Crusader and Venetian forces began an assault on the Golden Horn fortifications by crossing the waterway to the northwest wall of the city, but, because of bad weather, the assault forces were driven back when the troops that landed came under heavy archery fire in open ground between Constantinople's fortifications and the shore.

== Capture of the city ==
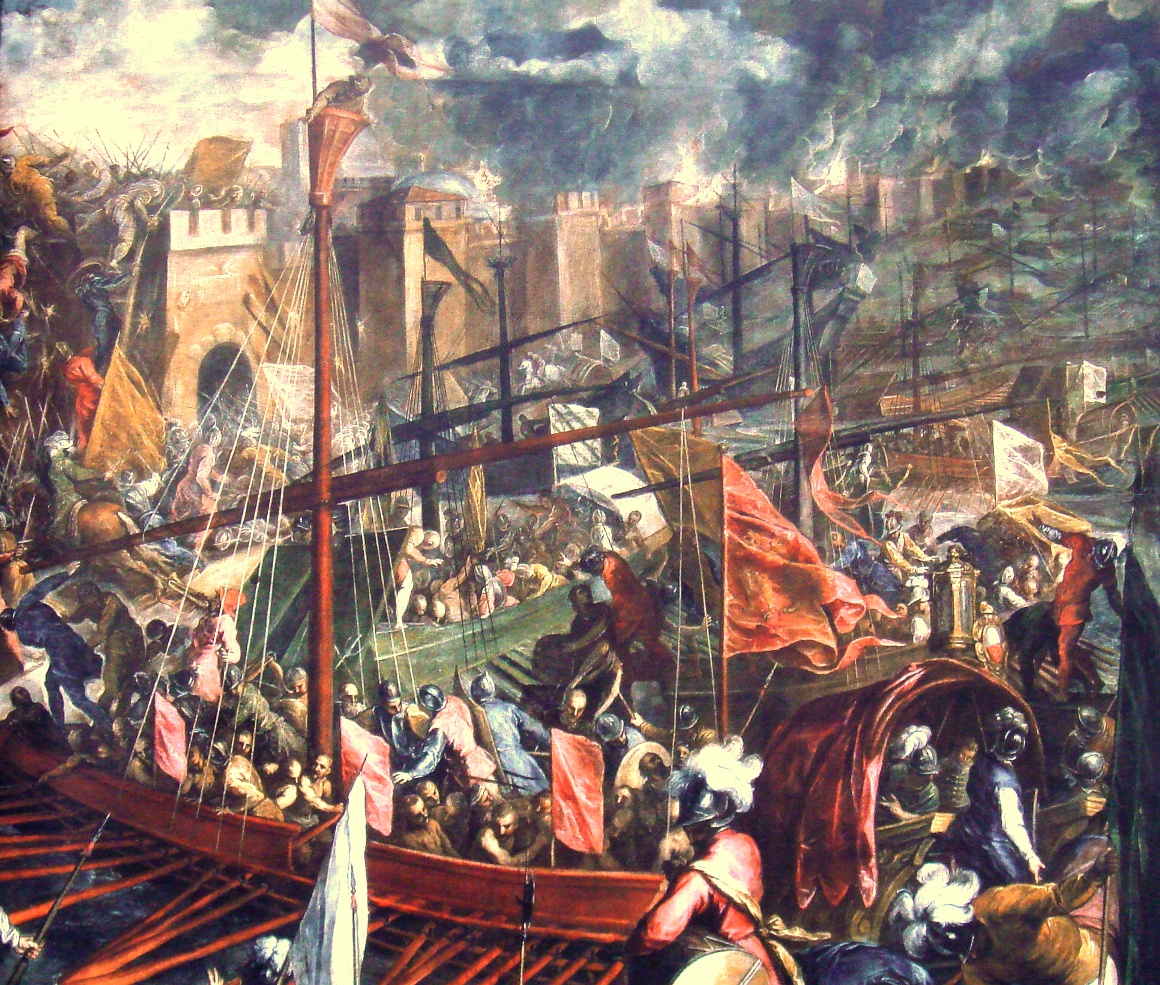
The siege of Constantinople in 1204, by Palma il Giovane

On 12 April 1204 weather conditions finally favoured the Crusaders as the weather cleared and a second assault on the city was ordered. A strong north wind aided the Venetian ships near the Golden Horn to come close to the city wall, which enabled attackers to seize some of the towers along the wall. After a short battle approximately 70 Crusaders managed to enter the city. Some Crusaders were eventually able to knock holes in the walls large enough for a few knights at a time to crawl through; the Venetians were also successful at scaling the walls from the sea, although there was extremely bloody fighting with the Varangians. The Crusaders captured the Blachernae section of the city in the northwest and used it as a base to attack the rest of the city, but while attempting to defend themselves with a wall of fire they ended up burning down even more of the city. Emperor Alexios V fled from the city that night through the Polyandriou (Rhegium) Gate and escaped into the countryside to the west.

== Sack of Constantinople ==
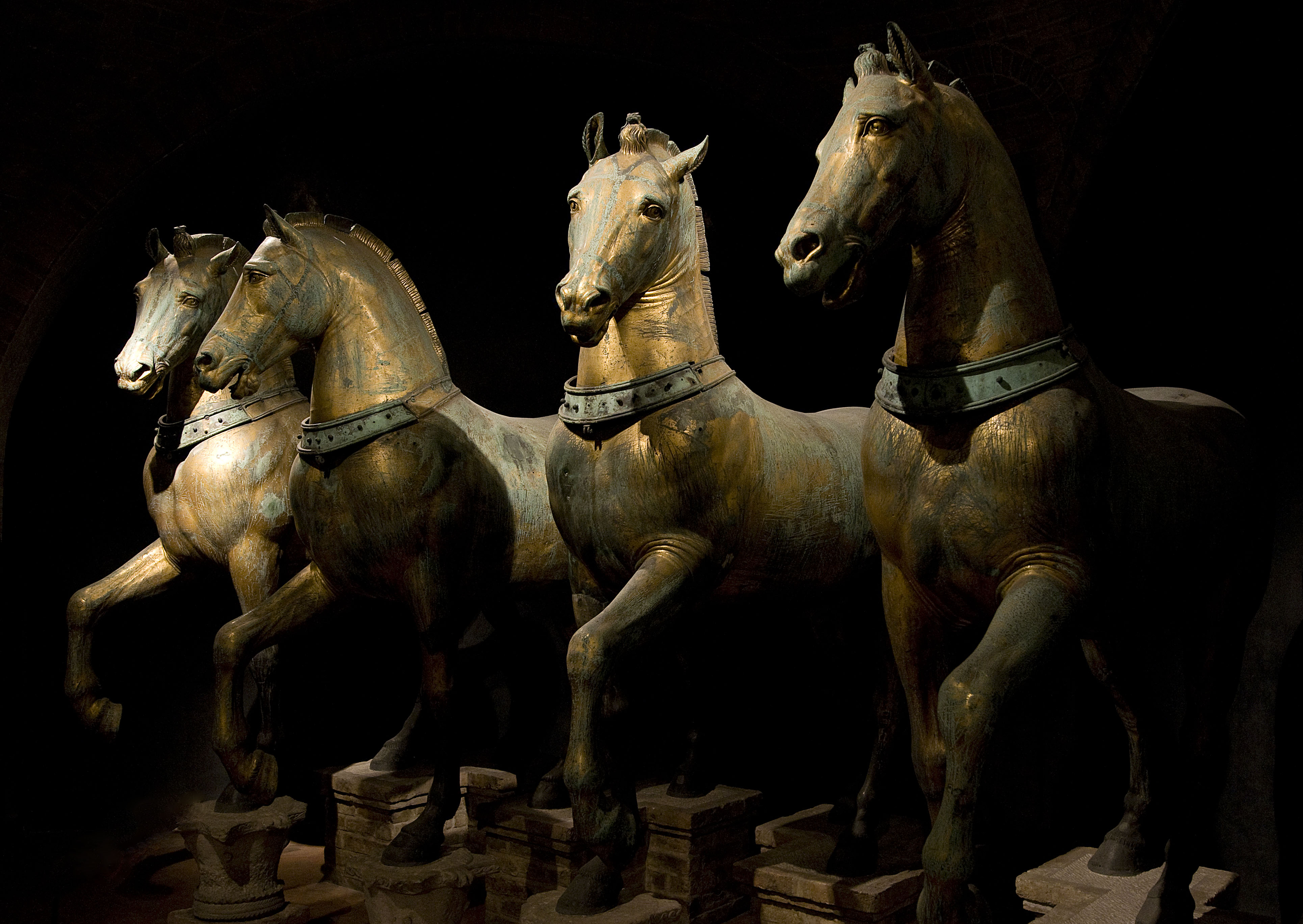
The original Horses of Saint Mark displayed inside St Mark's Basilica in Venice; replicas adorn the outside.

The Crusaders looted, pillaged, and vandalized Constantinople for three days, during which many ancient and medieval Roman and Greek works were either seized or destroyed. The famous bronze horses from the Hippodrome were sent back to adorn the façade of St Mark's Basilica in Venice, where they remain to this day. Works of considerable artistic value were destroyed for their material value, including the precious bronze statue of Hercules, created by the legendary Lysippos, court sculptor of Alexander the Great. As with many other considerable bronze artworks, the statue was melted down for minting money.

Despite their oaths and the threat of excommunication, the Crusaders systematically assaulted the city's holy sanctuaries, destroying or seizing all that was deemed remotely of value; little was spared, even the tombs of the emperors interned in the Church of the Holy Apostles were pillaged. Of the civilian population of Constantinople, it is estimated 2,000 were killed. The Crusaders even sacked churches, monasteries and convents. Church altars were smashed and torn to pieces for their gold and marble. The Venetians stole religious relics and works of art, which they took back to Venice.

It was said that the total amount looted from Constantinople was about 900,000 silver marks. The Venetians received 150,000 silver marks that was their due to the Crusaders 50,000. A further 100,000 silver marks were divided evenly between the Crusaders and Venetians. 500,000 silver marks were purportedly stolen by Crusader knights.

== Aftermath ==
According to a prearranged treaty the empire was apportioned between Venice and the crusade's leaders, and the Latin Empire of Constantinople was established. Boniface was not elected as the new emperor, although the citizens seemed to consider him as such; the Venetians thought he had too many connections with the former empire because of his brother, Renier of Montferrat, who had been married to Maria Comnena, daughter and for a time heir-apparent of Manuel I. Instead they placed Baldwin of Flanders on the throne. He was crowned Emperor in the Hagia Sophia as Baldwin I of Constantinople. Boniface went on to found the Kingdom of Thessalonica, a vassal state of the new Latin Empire. The Venetians also founded the Duchy of the Archipelago in the Aegean Sea.

Most of the Byzantine aristocracy fled the city. Amongst the ordinary people of the former empire there was no sympathy for the Byzantine elite, who were seen as having ruled the empire with increasing incompetence. The contemporary Byzantine historian and eyewitness Nicetas Choniates closed his account of the fall of the city with the following description of a column of aristocratic refugees, including the Patriarch, making their way to Selymbria:

The peasants and common riff-raff jeered at those of us from Byzantium and were thick-headed enough to call our miserable poverty and nakedness equality...Many were only too happy to accept this outrage, saying "Blessed be the Lord that we have grown rich", and buying up for next to nothing the property that their fellow-countrymen were forced to offer for sale, for they had not yet had much to do with the beef-eating Latins and they did not know that they served a wine as pure and unmixed as unadulterated bile, nor that they would treat the Byzantines with utter contempt.

— Nicetas Choniates

Byzantine aristocratic refugees founded their own successor states, the most notable of these being the Empire of Nicaea under Theodore Laskaris (a relative of Alexius III), the Empire of Trebizond and the Despotate of Epirus.

The sack weakened the Byzantine Empire, which allowed neighbouring groups such as the Sultanate of Rum, and later the Ottoman Turks, to gain influence (see the Byzantine–Ottoman wars).

== Reactions to the Sack of Constantinople ==
=== Contemporary opposition to the sack ===
"O City, City, eye of all cities, universal boast, supramundane wonder, nurse of churches, leader of the faith, guide of Orthodoxy, beloved topic of orations, the abode of every good thing! Oh City, that hast drunk at the hand of the Lord the cup of his fury! O City, consumed by fire..."

— Niketas Choniates laments the fall of Constantinople to the Crusaders.

Several prominent Crusaders, including Enguerrand II of Boves, Simon de Montfort, 5th Earl of Leicester and Guy of Vaux-de-Cernay, among others, disagreed with the attacks on Zara and Constantinople and refused to take part in them. Indeed, most of the Crusaders did not take part in the attacks in Constantinople or did so unwillingly.

Byzantinist Jonathan Harris wrote that when the decision was made to divert to Constantinople "A sizable proportion [of Crusaders] left the army and made their own way to the Holy Land. Those who remained only agreed very reluctantly to the diversion when subjected to a mixture of financial and emotional blackmail. Even then, many hesitated before the final attack in April 1204, and had serious doubts as to whether it was legitimate to attack a Christian city in this way".

The French nobleman Simon de Montfort, in particular, did not participate and was an outspoken critic. He and his associates, including Guy of Vaux-de-Cernay, left the crusade when the decision was taken to divert to Constantinople to place Alexius IV Angelus on the throne. Instead, Simon and his followers travelled to the court of King Emeric of Hungary and thence to Acre. Several other substantial contingents, including the large Flemish fleet with Marie of Champagne on board, sailed directly to Acre as well.

Monk and poet Guiot de Provins wrote a satirical play in response to the Crusade accusing the papacy of avarice. Somewhat later, Guilhem Figueira wrote a sirventes and repeated these accusations, asserting that greed was the primary factor behind the crusade. He harshly stated:

Deceitful Rome, avarice ensnares you, so that you shear the wool of your sheep too much. May the Holy Ghost, who takes on human flesh, hear my prayer and break your beak, O Rome! You will never have a truce with me because you are false and perfidious with us and the Greeks ... Rome, you do little harm to the Saracens, but you massacre Greeks and Latins. In hell-fire and ruin you have your seat, Rome.

However, Pope Innocent III also opposed the sack; he neither sanctioned it nor knew about it. Innocent III had forbidden the Crusaders to attack the Byzantine Empire, instructing the leader, Boniface of Montferrat, that "The crusade must not attack Christians, but should proceed as quickly as possible to the Holy Land". When he found out about the events he wrote two angry letters addressed to Boniface. One of them reads:

How will the Greek Church... return to ecclesiastical unity and devotion to the Apostolic See, a church which has seen in the Latins nothing except an example of affliction and the works of Hell, so that now it rightly detests them more than dogs?... It was not enough for them [the Latins] to empty the imperial treasuries and to plunder the spoils of princes and lesser folk, but rather they extended their hands to church treasuries and, what was more serious, to their possessions, even ripping away silver tablets from altars and breaking them into pieces among themselves, violating sacristies and crosses, and carrying away relics.

Historian Robert Lee Wolff interprets the two letters from Innocent III as a sign of the Pope's "early spirit of understanding for the Greeks".

Only one contemporary Arab-Muslim historian, Ibn al-Athir, provided a detailed report of the sack of Constantinople by the Crusaders. It struck him as "an atrocity in its scale of rapine, slaughter and wanton destruction of centuries of classical and Christian civilisation".

=== Modern assessment ===
The prominent medievalist Sir Steven Runciman wrote in 1954: "There was never a greater crime against humanity than the Fourth Crusade." According to historian Martin Arbagi, "The diversion of the Fourth Crusade in 1204 was one of the great atrocities of medieval history, and Pope Innocent III placed most of the blame on Venice". The controversy that has surrounded the Fourth Crusade has led to diverging opinions in academia on whether its objective was indeed the capture of Constantinople. The traditional position, which holds that this was the case, was challenged by Donald E. Queller and Thomas F. Madden in their book The Fourth Crusade (1997).

Constantinople was considered as a bastion of Christianity that defended Europe from Muslim invasion, and the Fourth Crusade's sack of the city dealt an irreparable blow to this eastern bulwark. Although the Greeks retook Constantinople after 57 years of Latin rule, the Crusade crippled the Byzantine Empire. Reduced to Constantinople, north-western Anatolia, and a portion of the southern Balkans, the empire fell when the Ottoman Muslims captured the city in 1453.

=== Apology ===
Eight hundred years later, Pope John Paul II twice expressed sorrow for the events of the Fourth Crusade. In 2001, he wrote to Christodoulos, Archbishop of Athens, "It is tragic that the assailants, who set out to secure free access for Christians to the Holy Land, turned against their brothers in the faith. The fact that they were Latin Christians fills Catholics with deep regret." In 2004, while Bartholomew I, Patriarch of Constantinople, was visiting the Vatican, John Paul II asked, "How can we not share, at a distance of eight centuries, the pain and disgust." This has been regarded as an apology to the Greek Orthodox Church for the massacres perpetrated by the warriors of the Fourth Crusade.

In April 2004, in a speech on the 800th anniversary of the city's capture, Ecumenical Patriarch Bartholomew I formally accepted the apology. "The spirit of reconciliation is stronger than hatred," he said during a liturgy attended by Roman Catholic Archbishop Philippe Barbarin of Lyon, France. "We receive with gratitude and respect your cordial gesture for the tragic events of the Fourth Crusade. It is a fact that a crime was committed here in the city 800 years ago." Bartholomew said his acceptance came in the spirit of Easter. "The spirit of reconciliation of the resurrection... incites us toward reconciliation of our churches."

== See also ==
- Frankokratia
- Siege of Zara
- Siege of Constantinople (1203)
- Siege of Constantinople (1235)
- Fall of Constantinople (1453)
- List of sieges

== Sources ==
- Phillips, Jonathan P. (2004). The Fourth Crusade and the Sack of Constantinople. East Rutherford, NJ: Penguin. ISBN 978-0-14-303590-9.
- Queller, Donald E.; Madden, Thomas F.; Andrea, Alfred J. (1999) [1997]. The Fourth Crusade: The Conquest of Constantinople (2nd ed.). University of Pennsylvania Press. ISBN 978-0-8122-1713-1.
- Queller, Donald E.; Compton, Thomas K.n; Campbell, Donald A. (July 1974). "The Fourth Crusade: The Neglected Majority". Speculum. 49 (3): 441–465. doi:10.2307/2851751. JSTOR 2851751. S2CID 163442765.
