= Latins (Middle Ages) =

Followers of the Latin Church of Western Christianity during the Middle Ages

The name Latin was a common demonym among the followers of the Latin Church of Western Christianity during the Middle Ages.

The term was related to the predominance of the Latin Church, which is the largest autonomous particular church within the broader Catholic Church, and took its name from its origins in the Latin-speaking world which had Rome as its center. Although the Latin language was the official language of the Roman Empire, going back to the Italic tribe who in antiquity founded Ancient Rome, the name was used irrespective of ethnicity, including by Germanic, Italic, Celtic and Slavic peoples. Thus the people associated with the states created during the Crusades were generally referred to as Latins or Franks, the latter being one prominent group represented.

In the Byzantine Empire, and the broader Greek Orthodox world, it was generally a negative characterisation, especially after the East-West schism in 1054. It did not share this negative connotation in the West, where many self-identified with the term, such as Petrarch, when he states "Sumus enim non greci, non barbari, sed itali et latini." ("We are not Greeks or barbarians; we are Italians and Latins.").

== See also ==
- Greek East and Latin West
- Latin Church in the Middle East
- Latin Empire
- Latinokratia
- Western Europe
- Barbarian
- Vlachs
- Walhaz
