= Alexios IV Angelos =

Byzantine emperor from 1203 to 1204

- Emperor and Autocrat of the Romans
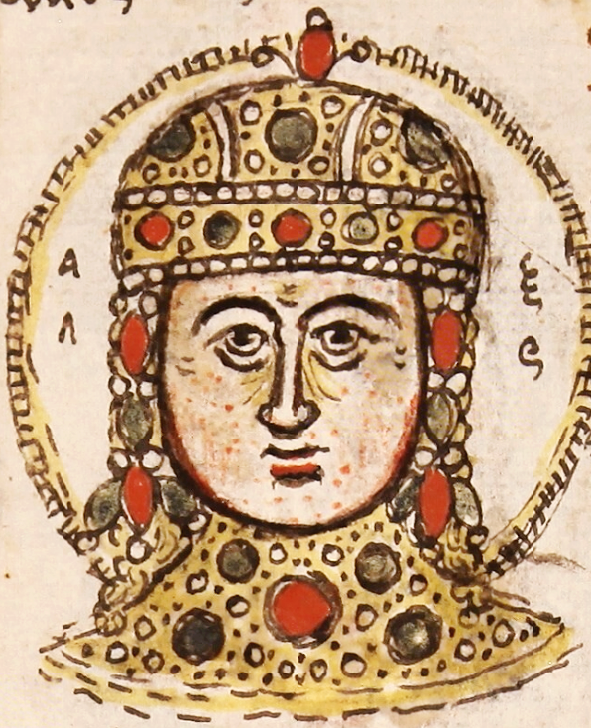
- 15th-century portrait of Alexios IV (from a 15th-century codex containing a copy of the Extracts of History by Joannes Zonaras)

Byzantine emperor
- Reign: 19 July 1203 – 27 January 1204
- Coronation: 1 August 1203
- Predecessor: Alexios III Angelos
- Successor: Alexios V Doukas
- Co-Emperor: Isaac II Angelos
- Born: c. 1182
- Died: February 1204 (aged 21); Constantinople (now Istanbul, Turkey)
Names
- Alexios Angelos; Αλέξιος Άγγελος; Aléxios Ángelos
- Dynasty: Angelos
- Father: Isaac II Angelos
- Mother: (Likely) Irene Tornikina
- Religion: Eastern Orthodox

Alexios IV Angelos (Greek: Ἀλέξιος Ἄγγελος, romanized: Aléxios Ángelos; c. 1182 – February 1204), Latinized as Alexius IV Angelus, was Byzantine Emperor from August 1203 to January 1204.

== Early life ==
He was the son of Emperor Isaac II Angelos and his first wife Irene, likely a Tornikina. His paternal uncle was his predecessor, Emperor Alexios III Angelos.

== Prince in exile ==
The young Alexios was imprisoned in 1195 when Alexios III overthrew Isaac II in a coup. His father was ultimately blinded, but Alexios was largely unharmed. In 1201, two Pisan merchants were employed to smuggle Alexios out of Constantinople to the Holy Roman Empire, where he took refuge with his brother-in-law Philip of Swabia, King of Germany.

According to the contemporary account of Robert of Clari it was while Alexios was at Philip's court that he met with Marquis Boniface of Montferrat, Philip's cousin, who had been chosen to lead the Fourth Crusade, but had temporarily left the Crusade during the siege of Zara in 1202 to visit Philip. Boniface and Alexios allegedly discussed diverting the Crusade to Constantinople so that Alexios could be restored to his father's throne. Montferrat returned to the Crusade while it wintered at Zara and he was shortly followed by Prince Alexios's envoys who offered to the Crusaders 10,000 Byzantine soldiers to help fight in the Crusade, maintain 500 knights in the Holy Land, the service of the Byzantine navy (20 ships) in transporting the Crusader army to Egypt, as well as money to pay off the Crusaders' debt to the Republic of Venice with 200,000 silver marks.

Additionally, he promised to bring the Greek Orthodox Church under the authority of the pope. The Venetians and most of the leaders were in favour of the plan; however, some were not, and there were defections, including Simon de Montfort. In 1203, the fleet arrived at Constantinople. Alexios was paraded outside the walls, but the citizens were apathetic, as Alexios III, though a usurper and illegitimate in the eyes of the westerners, was an acceptable emperor for the Byzantine citizens.

== Emperor ==
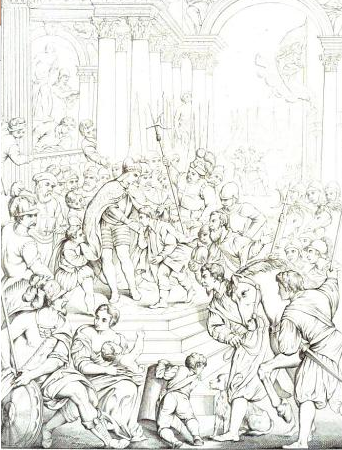
Alexios comes to Zara to request the assistance of the Crusaders; sketch from a painting in the Doge's Palace, Venice

On 18 July 1203, the Crusaders launched an assault on the city, and Alexios III immediately fled into Thrace. The next morning the Crusaders were surprised to find that the citizens had released Isaac II from prison and proclaimed him emperor, despite the fact that he had been blinded to make him ineligible to rule. The Crusaders could not accept this, and forced Isaac II to proclaim his son Alexios IV co-emperor.

Despite Alexios' grand promises, Isaac, the more experienced and practical of the two, knew that the Crusaders' debt could never be repaid from the imperial treasury. Alexios, however, had apparently not grasped how far the empire's financial resources had fallen during the previous fifty years. Alexios did manage to raise half the sum promised (100,000 silver marks), by appropriating treasures from the church and by confiscating the property of his enemies. He then attempted to defeat his uncle Alexios III, who remained in control of Thrace. The sack of some Thracian towns helped Alexios' situation a little, but meanwhile hostility between the restive Crusaders and the inhabitants of Constantinople was growing.

In December 1203, violence exploded between the citizens of Constantinople and the Crusaders. Enraged mobs seized and brutally murdered any foreigner they could lay hands upon, and the Crusaders felt that Alexios had not fulfilled his promises to them. Alexios refused their demands, and is quoted as saying, "I will not do any more than I have done." While relations with the Crusaders were deteriorating, Alexios had become deeply unpopular with the Roman citizenry, and with his own father. Blinded and nearly powerless, Isaac II resented having to share the throne with his son; he spread rumours of Alexios' supposed sexual perversity, alleging he kept company with "depraved men". The chronicler Nicetas Choniates dismissed Alexios as "childish" and criticized his familiarity with the Crusaders and his lavish lifestyle. At the beginning of January 1204, Alexios IV retaliated against the Crusaders by setting fire to 17 ships filled with inflammable materials and sending them against the Venetian fleet, but the attempt failed.

== Deposition ==
At the end of January 1204, the populace of Constantinople rebelled and tried to proclaim a rival emperor Nicholas Canabus who took sanctuary in the Hagia Sophia. Alexios IV attempted to reach a reconciliation with the Crusaders, entrusting the anti-western courtier Alexios Doukas Murzuphlus with a mission to gain Crusader support. However, Alexios Doukas imprisoned both Alexios IV and his father on the night of 27 January 1204. Isaac II died soon afterwards, possibly of old age or from poison, and Alexios IV was strangled (probably on 8 February). Alexios Doukas was proclaimed emperor as Alexios V. During Alexios IV's brief reign, the empire's territories along the Black Sea coast declared independence, leading to the Byzantine successor state known as the Empire of Trebizond. The volatile situation in Constantinople at the time ensured that the empire lacked the wherewithal to maintain control of Trebizond, resulting in a de facto recognition of its independence, although it de jure remained an imperial possession.

== Legacy ==
Alexios IV and his actions brought the empire to a state considerably worse than it had been ever before. It had lost a great deal of territory and would continue to do so due to the power struggle and subsequent crusade. By the end of the Fourth Crusade, the Byzantine empire had been reduced to a regional power. It would recuperate somewhat, as the capital of Constantinople would eventually be recovered in 1261, nearly six decades after the short reign of Alexios. However, the aftermath of the Fourth Crusade would ultimately be a key factor in the empire's instability and fragmentation in subsequent centuries. In 1453, Constantinople was again captured and sacked, this time by the Ottoman Empire, and the remaining Byzantine territories were lost soon after.

== See also ==
- List of Byzantine emperors

== Sources ==
- Angold, Michael, The Fourth Crusade (London and New York, 2004), ISBN 9780582356108.
- Brand, C.M., 'A Byzantine Plan for the Fourth Crusade', Speculum, 43 (1968), pp. 462–475.
- Harris, Jonathan, Byzantium and the Crusades (2nd ed. London and New York, 2014). ISBN 978-1-78093-767-0
- Oxford Dictionary of Byzantium, Oxford University Press, 1991, pp. 65–66.
- Phillips, Jonathan, The Fourth Crusade And The Sack Of Constantinople (London and New York, 2004), ISBN 9781448114528.
- Plate, William (1867). "Alexios IV Angelos". In William Smith (ed.). Dictionary of Greek and Roman Biography and Mythology. Vol. 1. Boston: Little, Brown and Company. p. 131.
- Savignac, David. "The Medieval Russian Account of the Fourth Crusade – A New Annotated Translation".

Alexios IV Angelos Angelid dynasty Born: 1182 Died: 1204
Regnal titles
Preceded by Alexios III Angelos	Byzantine emperor 1203–1204 with Isaac II Angelos	Succeeded by Alexios V Doukas
