= List of Byzantine emperors =

Emperor and Autocrat of the Romans
- Imperial
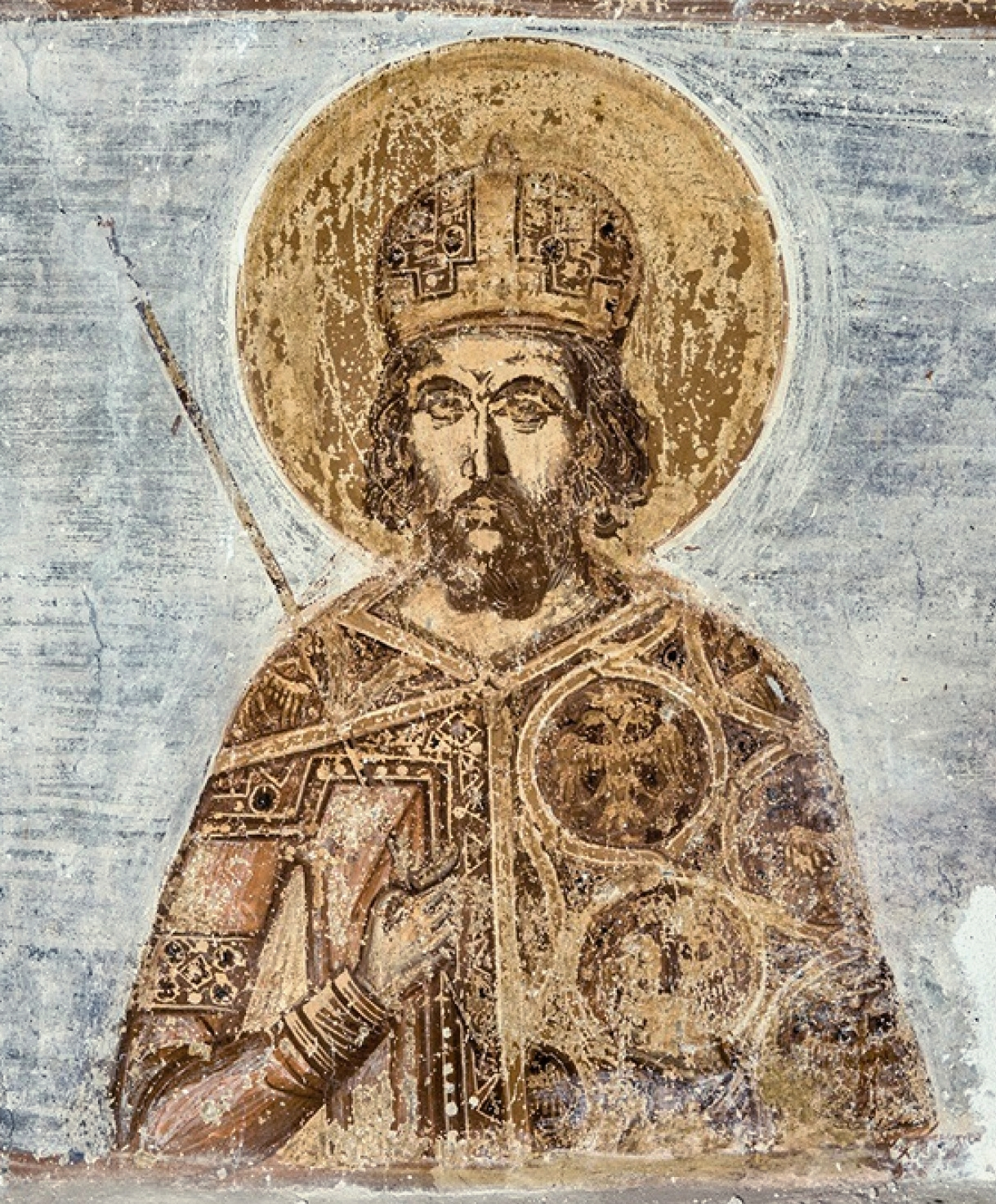
- Last to reign Constantine XI; 6 January 1449 – 29 May 1453

Details
- First monarch: Constantine the Great (historiographical convention)
- Last monarch: Constantine XI Palaiologos
- Formed: 11 May 330
- Abolished: 29 May 1453
- Residences: Great Palace, Blachernae Palace
- Appointer: Unspecified, de facto hereditary (Note: Historian Donald Nicol writes, "Hereditary succession to the throne was a custom or a convenience in Byzantium, not an inviolable... principle. Emperors, particularly in the later period, would take pains to nominate their sons as co-emperors, for the rule of a dynasty was meant to ensure stability and continuity. But in theory, the road to the throne was a carriere ouverte aux talents [career open to talents]...")

The foundation of Constantinople in 330 AD marks the conventional start of the Byzantine Empire, which fell to the Ottoman Empire in 1453 AD. Only the emperors who were recognized as legitimate rulers and exercised sovereign authority are included, to the exclusion of junior co-emperors who never attained the status of sole or senior ruler, as well as of the various usurpers or rebels who claimed the imperial title.

The following list starts with Constantine the Great, the first Christian emperor, who rebuilt the city of Byzantium as the imperial capital, Constantinople, and who was regarded by the later emperors as the model ruler. Modern historians distinguish this later phase of the Roman Empire as the Byzantine Empire due to the imperial seat moving from Rome to Byzantium, the Empire's integration of Christianity, and the predominance of Greek over Latin.

The Byzantine Empire was the direct legal continuation of the eastern half of the Roman Empire following its division in 395. Emperors listed below up to Theodosius I in 395 were sole or joint rulers of the entire Roman Empire. The Western Roman Empire continued until 476. Byzantine emperors considered themselves Roman emperors in direct succession from Augustus; the term "Byzantine" became conventional in Western historiography in the 19th century. The use of the title "Roman Emperor" by those ruling from Constantinople was not contested until after the papal coronation of the Frankish Charlemagne as Holy Roman emperor (25 December 800).

The title of all emperors preceding Heraclius was officially "Augustus" (Note: Sometimes the Greek-language equivalent "Sebastos" was used instead), although other titles such as Dominus were also used. Their names were preceded by Imperator Caesar and followed by Augustus. Following Heraclius, the title commonly became the Greek Basileus (Gr. Βασιλεύς), which had formerly meant sovereign, though Augustus continued to be used in a reduced capacity. Following the establishment of the rival Holy Roman Empire in Western Europe, the title "Autokrator" (Gr. Αὐτοκράτωρ) was increasingly used. In later centuries, the emperor could be referred to by Western Christians as the "emperor of the Greeks". Towards the end of the Empire, the standard imperial formula of the Byzantine ruler was "[Emperor's name] in Christ, Emperor and Autocrat of the Romans" (cf. Ῥωμαῖοι and Rûm).

Dynasties were a common tradition and structure for rulers and government systems in the Medieval period. The principle or formal requirement for hereditary succession was not a part of the Empire's governance; hereditary succession was a custom and tradition, carried on as habit and benefited from some sense of legitimacy, but not as a "rule" or inviolable requirement for office at the time.

Throughout the history of the Byzantine Empire, the vast majority of emperors originated from the state's traditional military recruitment grounds. During the early imperial period, many rulers hailed from the Latin-speaking regions of the Balkans (Illyricum) and Thrace, whereas in subsequent centuries the leadership was predominantly drawn from Anatolia and Thrace. Individuals of Armenian origin or descent also represented a notable and recurring element within the imperial succession, producing several prominent rulers and dynasties. Empress Irene of Athens represents the sole documented instance in Byzantine history of a ruler born in the Greek peninsula.

== Constantinian dynasty (306–363) ==
Constantinian dynasty
Portrait	Name	Reign	Notes
bust	Constantine I "the Great" Flavius Valerius Constantinus Φλάουιος Οὐαλέριος Κωνσταντῖνος	25 July 306 – 22 May 337 (30 years, 9 months and 27 days); West; then whole	Born at Naissus c. 272 as the son of the Augustus Constantius and Helena. Proclaimed Augustus of the western empire upon the death of his father on 25 July 306, he became sole ruler of the western empire after the Battle of the Milvian Bridge in 312. In 324, he defeated the eastern Augustus Licinius and re-united the empire under his rule, reigning as sole emperor until his death. Constantine completed the administrative and military reforms begun under Diocletian, who had begun ushering in the Dominate period. Actively interested in Christianity, he played a crucial role in its development and the Christianization of the Roman world by convening the First Ecumenical Council at Nicaea. He is said to have received baptism on his deathbed. He also reformed coinage by introducing the gold solidus, and initiated a large-scale building program, culminating in the refounding of the city of Byzantium as "New Rome", popularly known as Constantinople. He was regarded as the model of all subsequent Byzantine emperors. His reign was marked by greater imperial control over the Eastern Church and the construction of new churches, especially at the holy places sacred to Christianity. To this day, Constantine is venerated as a saint by the Eastern Orthodox church.
bust	Constantius II Flavius Julius Constantius Φλάουιος Ἰούλιος Κωνστάντιος	9 September 337 – 3 November 361 (24 years, 1 month and 25 days); East; then whole	Born on 7 August 317, as the second surviving son of Constantine I, he inherited the eastern third of the Roman Empire upon his father's death, sole Roman Emperor from 353, after the overthrow of the western usurper Magnentius; after two years on the run, the latter committed suicide. Constantius' reign saw military activity on all frontiers, and dissension between Arianism, favored by the emperor, and the supporters of the Nicene Creed. In his reign, Constantinople was accorded equal status to Rome, and the original Hagia Sophia was built. Constantius appointed Constantius Gallus and Julian as Caesares, and died on his way to confront Julian, who had risen up against him.
coin	Julian "the Apostate" Flavius Claudius Julianus Φλάουιος Κλαύδιος Ἰουλιανός	3 November 361 – 26 June 363 (1 year, 7 months and 23 days)	Born in May 332 at Constantinople (the first emperor born there), Julian was the grandson of Constantius I and cousin of Constantius II. Proclaimed by his army in Gaul, he became the legitimate Emperor upon the death of Constantius II. Julian has been described as the last pagan emperor of the Roman Empire and was generally opposed to Christianity. He was killed on campaign against Sassanid Persia, despite his initial success in surrounding the ancient city of Ctesiphon. For his adherence to the old Roman gods and rejection of the Christian faith, he became known as Julian the Apostate.
coin	Jovian Jovianus, Ἰοβιανός (Note: From the fourth century, emperors and other high-profile men of non-aristocratic birth often bore the name "Flavius", the family name of the Constantinian dynasty. Because it was often used as a status marker rather than a personal name, "Flavius" will generally be omitted in the following entries for simplicity.)	27 June 363 – 17 February 364 (7 months and 21 days)	Born in c. 332, Jovian hailed from a military family and was captain of the guards (protector domesticus) under both Constantius II and Julian. He was elected by the army upon Julian's death. After assuming power, Jovian withdrew Roman forces from Persia and made an unpopular peace with them, which lasted until the early sixth century. Following an autumn spent in Antioch, he died of natural causes in central Anatolia and was buried in Constantinople.

== Valentinian dynasty (364–392) ==
(#) – Ambiguous legitimacy (Note: Unless otherwise noted to be some other ambiguity, the emperors marked to be of ambiguous legitimacy are those who fulfill one or more of the inclusion criteria above, but who are not universally regarded by scholars to count as legitimate. In most cases, such figures are those who held power only briefly, and/or who in times of more than one emperor held one of the capitals but never achieved the full recognition of the other emperor(s).)

Valentinianic dynasty
Portrait	Name (Note: Distinction between nomen, praenomen and cognomen, the core elements of Roman naming conventions, began to fade away from the 3rd century onwards. Given that "new Romans" —that is, barbarians turned citizens— adopted the names of their masters, many citizens adopted the names Julius, Flavius (notable the Constantinians) and Marcus Aurelius (notable the 3rd century emperors), thus making them obsolete as surnames. As a result, most citizens of the Empire, even emperors, reverted back to single-names by the 5th century.)	Reign	Notes
coin	Valentinian I "the Great" Valentinianus, Οὐαλεντινιανὸς	25/26 February 364 – 17 November 375 (11 years, 8 months and 23 days); Whole; then West	Born in 321. An officer under Julian and Jovian, he was elected by the army upon Jovian's death. He soon appointed his younger brother Valens as Emperor of the East, while he himself ruled in the West. Died of cerebral haemorrhage in 375.
coin	Valens Ουάλης	28 March 364 – 9 August 378 (14 years, 4 months and 12 days; East)	Born in 328, Valens was not especially fit for the imperial office if Ammianus can be believed, but he was appointed Emperor of the East in 364 by his elder brother Valentinian I, who wanted a malleable colleague in the other half of the Empire. (Note: While some historians attribute the division of the Roman Empire into East and West after Theodosius the Great split the throne between his sons, the year 364 probably more accurately marks the point at which the Empire was actually divided.) Following Valentinian's death in 375, his son Gratian succeeded him. Meanwhile, Valens faced the challenge of the invading Huns, whose ferocity pushed the Gothic tribes to seek refuge within the Empire; Valens allowed them to settle on the condition that they become allies of the Empire. When the Goths were mistreated at Roman hands and rebelled, Valens proceeded to face them without awaiting assistance from Gratian's armies and was killed at the Battle of Adrianople.
coin	Gratian Gratianus, Γρατιανός	9 August 378 – 19 January 379 (5 months and 10 days)	Born 18 April 359, Gratian was emperor of the Western Roman Empire from 367 until his death in 383. The eldest son of Valentinian I, Gratian, was raised to the rank of Augustus as a child and inherited the West after his father's death in 375. Gratian led a campaign across the Rhine, attacked the Lentienses, and forced the tribe to surrender. That same year, the eastern emperor Valens was killed fighting the Goths at the Battle of Adrianople. Gratian then elevated Theodosius to replace him in 379. Gratian phrases out the title of Pontifex maximus, replacing it with the Latin phrase: Pontifex inclytus ("honorable pontiff").
coin	Procopius (#) Προκόπιος	28 September 365 – 27 May 366 (7 months and 29 days; East)	Maternal cousin of Julian; revolted against Valens and captured Constantinople, where the people proclaimed him emperor. Deposed, captured, and executed by Valens.

== Theodosian dynasty (379–457) ==
Theodosian dynasty
Portrait	Name	Reign	Notes
bust	Theodosius I "the Great" Θεοδόσιος	19 January 379 – 17 January 395 (15 years, 11 months and 29 days); East; then whole	Born on 11 January 347 in Spain, Theodosius was an aristocrat and military leader, and later brother-in-law of Gratian, who appointed him as emperor of the East in 379 and gave him charge of Macedonia and Dacia. During his reign, Theodosius made Nicene Christianity the official religion of the state. He reunited the whole Empire after defeating Eugenius at the Battle of the Frigidus, in September 394. Theodosius died of a fever at Milan in 395, and his two sons, Honorius and Arcadius, became the emperors of the West and East, splitting power between them.
bust	Arcadius Ἀρκάδιος	17 January 395 – 1 May 408 (13 years, 3 months and 14 days; East)	Born in 377/378, Arcadius was the eldest son of Theodosius I and upon the latter's death in 395, the Roman Empire was permanently divided between the Eastern Roman Empire—later referred to as the Byzantine Empire—and the Western Roman Empire with Arcadius becoming Byzantine emperor in the East while his younger brother Honorius became emperor in the West; both were manipulated by court officials and did not possess their father's leadership abilities. After contracting an illness, Arcadius died in 408.
bust	Theodosius II "the Calligrapher" Θεοδόσιος	1 May 408 – 28 July 450 (42 years, 2 months and 27 days; East)	Born on 10 April 401, he was the only son of Arcadius and Eudoxia. Theodosius II succeeded the throne in 408 upon the death of his father. Because he was a minor, the praetorian prefect Anthemius was essentially regent from 408 to 414, but Theodosius II's elder sister Pulcheria played a critical role as regent and co-ruler during his early years. Theodosius II was known for his mild and scholarly temperament. He had a keen interest in theology, astronomy, and calligraphy, and was reportedly well educated. His long reign was marked by significant legal, administrative, and theological developments. One of the most enduring legacies of his reign was the construction of the Theodosian Walls. These massive fortifications protected the capital for over a millennium and are regarded as one of the greatest defensive structures of antiquity. Theodosius II strongly supported Nicene Christianity and convened the Council of Ephesus in 431 CE, which declared the Virgin Mary as Theotokos ("God-bearer") and condemned the theology of Nestorianism. He also commissioned the Theodosian Code, a comprehensive compilation of Roman laws published in 438; this codex organized and systematized the empire's legal framework and influenced later European legal traditions. During his reign, he faced constant threats from the Huns of Attila and negotiated treaties with them, paying substantial tributes to prevent invasions. He married Eudocia, a learned woman of Greek descent, who, like the emperor's sister Pulcheria, became an influential figure in the court. Their marriage produced one daughter, Licinia Eudoxia, who later married Valentinian III, the Western Roman Emperor. Theodosius II died in 450 from injuries sustained after falling off his horse while hunting.
coin	Marcian Marcianus, Μαρκιανός	25 August 450 – 27 January 457 (6 years, 5 months and 2 days; East)	Born in 396. A soldier and politician, he became emperor after being wed by the Augusta Pulcheria, sister of Theodosius II, following the latter's death. Died of gangrene.

== Leonid dynasty (457–518) ==
Leonid dynasty
Portrait	Name	Reign	Notes
bust	Leo I "the Thracian" Λέων	7 February 457 – 18 January 474 (16 years, 11 months and 11 days)	Born in Dacia c. 400, and of Bessian origin, Leo became a low-ranking officer and served as an attendant of the Gothic magister militum, Aspar, who chose him as emperor on Marcian's death. He was the first emperor to be crowned by the Patriarch of Constantinople, and the first one to legislate in Greek. His reign was marked by the pacification of the Danube and peace with Persia, which allowed him to intervene in the affairs of the West, supporting candidates for the throne and dispatching an expedition to recover Carthage from the Vandals in 468. Initially a puppet of Aspar, Leo began promoting the Isaurians as a counterweight to Aspar's Goths, marrying his daughter Ariadne to the Isaurian leader Tarasicodissa (Zeno). With their support, in 471, Aspar was murdered, and Gothic power over the army was broken.
coin	Leo II "the Younger" Λέων	18 January – November 474 (10 months)	Born 468, he was the grandson of Leo I by Leo's daughter Ariadne and her Isaurian husband, Zeno. He was raised to Augustus on 17 November 473. Leo ascended the throne after the death of his grandfather on 18 January 474. He crowned his father as co-emperor and effective regent on 29 January, dying shortly after.
coin	Zeno Ζήνων	29 January 474 – 9 January 475 (11 months and 11 days)	Born c. 425 in Isauria, originally named Tarasicodissa. As the leader of Leo I's Isaurian soldiers, he rose to comes domesticorum, married the emperor's daughter Ariadne and took the name Zeno, and played a crucial role in the elimination of Aspar and his Goths. He was named co-emperor by his son on 29 January 474 and became sole ruler upon the latter's death, but had to flee to his native country before Basiliscus in 475, only to regain control of the capital in 476. Zeno concluded peace with the Vandals, saw off challenges against him by Illus and Verina, and secured peace in the Balkans by enticing the Ostrogoths under Theodoric the Great to migrate to Italy, where the Gothic king ruled. Convincing Theodoric to move his Goths westward into Italy allowed Zeno to reduce what had been a drain to imperial resources, since these Germanic warriors had been exacting payments from the Empire throughout the 470s and 480s and menacing Eastern territories. As a consequence, Zeno's reign also saw the end of the western line of emperors. His pro-Miaphysite stance made him unpopular, and his promulgation of the Henotikon resulted in the Acacian Schism with the papacy.
coin	Basiliscus Βασιλίσκος	9 January 475 – August 476 (1 year and 7 months) with Marcus (475–476) (Note: Although they constitutionally held the same supreme power as their senior counterpart, it is customary among scholars of the later empire to only regard those who actually ruled as emperors, omitting junior co-emperors who only exercised power nominally and never governed in their own name.)	General and brother-in-law of Leo I, seized power from Zeno and crowned himself emperor on 12 January. Zeno was restored soon after. Died in 476/477
coin	Zeno (second reign)	August 476 – 9 April 491 (14 years and 8 months)	Retook the throne with the help of general Illus. Saw the end of the Western Roman Empire. Died of dysentery or epilepsy
carved portrait	Anastasius I "Dicorus" Ἀναστάσιος	11 April 491 – 9 July 518 (27 years, 2 months and 28 days)	Born c. 430 at Dyrrhachium, Anastasius was a palace official (silentiarius) when he was chosen as the husband and ultimately Emperor by Empress-dowager Ariadne. He was nicknamed "Dikoros" (Latin: Dicorus), because of his heterochromia. Apparently, there was some insistence by the citizenry of Constantinople that Zeno's successor should be an "Orthodox" Christian, which caused Ariadne to turn to Anastasius in the first place. Anastasius reformed the tax system and the Byzantine coinage and proved a frugal ruler, so that by the end of his reign he left a substantial surplus. His Miaphysitism led to widespread opposition, most notably the Revolt of Vitalian and the Acacian Schism. His reign was also marked by the first Bulgar raids into the Balkans and by a war with Persia over the foundation of Dara. He died childless. Shortly before his death, he tried to devise a means for one of his three nephews to succeed him by placing a note that read Regnum under their beds, but when none of them chose that bed, he decided instead to name the first person he saw the following morning. Keeping true to his word, when Justin—commander of the imperial guards—entered his presence first that morning, he was pronounced as Anastasius's successor.

== Justinian dynasty (518–602) ==
Justinian dynasty
Portrait	Name	Reign	Notes
coin	Justin I "the Thracian" Justinus, Ἰουστῖνος	9/10 July 518 – 1 August 527 (9 years and 23 days)	Born c. 450 at Bederiana (Justiniana Prima), Dardania. Officer and commander of the Excubitors bodyguard under Anastasius I, he was elected by army and people upon the death of Anastasius I.
mosaic	Justinian I "the Great" Petrus Sabbatius Justinianus Ἰουστινιανός	1 April 527 – 14 November 565 (38 years, 7 months and 13 days)	Born in 482/483 at Tauresium, Dardania, Justinian was the nephew of Justin I and was made consul in 521; he was elevated to co-emperor on 1 April 527, when Justin fell ill. He succeeded Justin I as emperor upon the former's death. Through his mighty general Belisarius, Justinian was able to regain North Africa, as well as much of Italy and Spain; these were territories that had previously been seized and occupied by various Germanic tribes (Vandals and Goths) at the expense of the former Western Roman Empire. He carried out a massive building program throughout the Empire, including the construction of the famous Hagia Sophia at Constantinople. Justinian was also responsible for the corpus juris civilis, or the "body of civil law", which is the foundation of law for many modern European nations.
coin	Justin II Justinus, Ἰουστῖνος	14 November 565 – 5 October 578 (12 years, 10 months and 21 days)	Born c. 520. Nephew of Justinian I, he seized the throne on the death of Justinian I with the support of the army and Senate. He restarted a war with Sassanid Persia by refusing to pay the agreed tribute for peace. Due to Persian victories, he became insane, hence in 573–574 the empire was under the regency of his wife Sophia, and in 574–578 under the regency of Tiberius Constantine.
coin	Tiberius II Constantine Tiberius Constantinus Τιβέριος Κωνσταντῖνος	26 September 578 – 14 August 582 (3 years, 10 months and 19 days)	Born c. 535, commander of the Excubitors, friend and adoptive son of Justin. Was named Caesar and regent in 574. Succeeded on Justin II's death.
coin	Maurice Mauricius Tiberius Μαυρίκιος Τιβέριος	13 August 582 – 27 November 602 (20 years, 3 months and 14 days) with Theodosius (590–602)	Born in 539 at Arabissus, Cappadocia. Maurice became an official and later a general of the Byzantine army in the East under Tiberius II, achieving notable successes against the Sassanian Empire during the Byzantine–Sassanian War of 572–591. He married the daughter of Tiberius II and was proclaimed emperor on 13 August 582 after Tiberius II's death. Maurice fought wars against the Sassanian kingdom on the eastern front of his empire, against the Avars and Slavs for control over the Balkans, and reinforced Byzantine holdings in Ravenna and Carthage. He is best remembered for his contributions to Byzantine military theory, notably his treatise Strategikon, a manual on warfare. Maurice named his son Theodosius as co-emperor in 590. Deposed by a centurion named Phocas, he was captured and executed on 27 November 602 along with his family at Chalcedon.
statue portrait	Phocas Focas, Φωκάς	23 November 602 – 5 October 610 (7 years, 10 months and 12 days)	Subaltern in the Balkan army, he led a rebellion that deposed Maurice. Increasingly unpopular and tyrannical, he was deposed and executed by Heraclius.

== Heraclian dynasty (610–695) ==
Heraclian dynasty
Portrait	Name	Reign	Notes
miniature portrait	Heraclius Ἡράκλειος (Note: From 629 onwards, Heraclius issued administrative documents in Greek. Latin continued to be used in communication with Western Europe until the end of the empire and coins continued to be struck with Latin inscriptions until the early eighth century.)	5 October 610 – 11 February 641 (30 years, 4 months and 6 days)	Born c. 575 as the eldest son of the Exarch of Africa, Heraclius the Elder. Began a revolt against Phocas in 609 and deposed him in October 610. Brought the Byzantine-Sassanid War of 602–628 to a successful conclusion but was unable to stop the Muslim conquest of Syria. Heraclius' officials worked to replace Latin with Greek as the official language of administration in the East. By this time Latin had long fallen out of everyday use in the Eastern part of the Empire and Heraclius's adopting of the title basileus (king or emperor) "marked a shift from Rome towards a Greek and Eastern Christian culture."
coin	Heraclius Constantine (Constantine III) (Note: Heraclius Constantine is often enumerated as 'Constantine III', though this name is also often applied to the earlier western emperor and has also been used for Heraclius Constantine's son Constans II (who actually ruled under the name 'Constantine', 'Constans' being a nickname).) Heraclius Constantinus Ἡράκλειος Κωνσταντῖνος	11 February – 25 May 641 (3 months and 14 days)	Born on 3 May 612 as the eldest son of Heraclius by his first wife Fabia Eudokia. Named co-emperor on 22 January 613, he succeeded to the throne with his younger brother Heraklonas following the death of Heraclius. Died of tuberculosis, allegedly poisoned by Empress-dowager Martina.
coin	Heraclonas Heraclius, Ἡράκλειος	25 May – 5 November (?) 641 (5 months and 11 days) with Tiberius-David, son of Heraclius (641)	Born in 626 to Heraclius' second wife Martina, named co-emperor on 4 July 638. Succeeded to the throne with Constantine III following the death of Heraclius. Sole emperor after the death of Constantine III, under the regency of Martina, but was forced to name Constans II co-emperor by the army, and was deposed by the Senate in September 641 (or early 642).
coin	Constans II "the Bearded" Constantinus, Κωνσταντῖνος	September 641 – 15 July 668 (26 years and 10 months)	Born on 7 November 630, Constans II was the son of Constantine III. Raised to co-emperor in the summer of 641 after his father's death due to army pressure, he became sole emperor after the forced abdication of his uncle Heracleonas and his exile. Baptized Heraclius, he reigned as Constantin but was given the nickname "Constans". He faced a number of Arab incursions, almost losing his life while commanding the Byzantine fleet. Constans had some military success against the Slavs in the Balkans. Around 662, he moved his seat and court to Syracuse, intending to liberate Italy from the Lombards. His presence was unwelcome in Italy, and there was "fierce opposition" to Constans II's abandonment of Constantinople. He was assassinated by a chamberlain in 668 while he was taking a bath.
mosaic	Constantine IV "the Younger" Constantinus, Κωνσταντῖνος	September 668 – 10 July (?) 685 (16 years and 10 months) with Heraclius and Tiberius, sons of Constans II (659–681)	Born in 652, co-emperor since 13 April 654, he succeeded following the murder of his father, Constans II. Erroneously called "Constantine the Bearded" by historians through confusion with his father. He called the Third Council of Constantinople, which condemned the heresy of Monothelitism, repelled the First Arab Siege of Constantinople, and died of dysentery.
mosaic	Justinian II "Rhinotmetus" Justinianus, Ἰουστινιανός	July 685 – 695 (10 years)	Born in 669, son of Constantine IV, he was named co-emperor in 681 and became sole emperor upon Constantine IV's death. Deposed by military revolt in 695, mutilated (hence his surname) and exiled to Cherson, whence he recovered his throne in 705.

== Twenty Years' Anarchy (695–717) ==
Twenty Years' Anarchy
Portrait	Name	Reign	Notes
coin	Leontius Λέων(τιος)	695 – 698 (3 years)	General from Isauria, he deposed Justinian II and was overthrown in another revolt in 698. He was executed in February 706.
coin	Tiberius III Τιβέριος	698 – 21 August (?) 705 (7 years)	Admiral of Germanic origin, originally named Apsimar. He rebelled against Leontius after a failed expedition. Reigned under the name of Tiberius until deposed by Justinian II in 705. Executed in February 706.
coin	Justinian II "Rhinotmetus" Justinianus, Ἰουστινιανός (second reign)	21 August (?) 705 – 4 November 711 (6 years, 2 months and 14 days) with Tiberius, son of Justinian II (706–711)	Returned on the throne with Bulgar support. Named son Tiberius as co-emperor in 706. Deposed and killed by a military revolt.
coin	Philippicus Filepicus, Φιλιππικός	4 November 711 – 3 June 713 (1 year, 6 months and 30 days)	A general of Armenian origin, he deposed Justinian II and was in turn overthrown by a revolt of the Opsician troops.
coin	Anastasius II Artemius Anastasius Ἀρτέμιος Ἀναστάσιος	4 June 713 – fall 715 (less than 2 years)	Originally named Artemios. A bureaucrat and secretary under Philippicus, he was raised to the purple by the soldiers who overthrew Philippicus. Deposed by another military revolt, he led an abortive attempt to regain the throne in 718 and was killed.
coin	Theodosius III Θεοδόσιος	Fall 715 – 25 March 717 (less than 2 years)	A fiscal official, he was proclaimed emperor by the rebellious Opsician troops. Entered Constantinople in November 715. Abdicated following the revolt of Leo the Isaurian and became a monk.

== Isaurian (Syrian) dynasty (717–802) ==
(#) – Ambiguous legitimacy

Isaurian dynasty
Portrait	Name	Reign	Notes
coin	Leo III "the Isaurian" Λέων (Note: Latin ceased being used in coin inscriptions under Leo III.)	25 March 717 – 18 June 741 (24 years, 2 months and 24 days)	Born c. 685 in Germanikeia, Commagene, he became a general. Rose in rebellion and secured the throne in spring 717. Repelled the Second Arab Siege of Constantinople and initiated the Byzantine Iconoclasm.
coin	Constantine V "Copronymus" Κωνσταντῖνος	18 June 741 – 14 September 775 (34 years, 2 months and 27 days)	Born in July 718, the only son of Leo III. Co-emperor since 720, he succeeded upon his father's death. After overcoming the usurpation of Artabasdos, he continued his father's iconoclastic policies and won several victories against the Arabs and the Bulgars. He is given the surname "the Dung-named" by hostile later chroniclers.
coin	Artabasdos (#) Ἀρτάβασδος	June 741 – 2 November 743 (2 years and 5 months) with Nikephoros, son of Artabasdos (741–743)	General and son-in-law of Leo III, Count of the Opsician Theme. Led a revolt that secured Constantinople, but was defeated and deposed by Constantine V, who blinded and tonsured him.
coin	Leo IV "the Khazar" Λέων	14 September 775 – 8 September 780 (4 years, 11 months and 25 days)	Born on 25 January 750 as the eldest son of Constantine V., Co-emperor since 751, he succeeded upon his father's death.
coin	Constantine VI "the Blind" Κωνσταντῖνος	8 September 780 – 19 August 797 (16 years, 11 months and 11 days)	Born in 771, the only child of Leo IV. Co-emperor since 14 April 776, sole emperor upon Leo's death in 780, until 790 under the regency of his mother, Irene of Athens. He was overthrown on Irene's orders, blinded and imprisoned, probably dying of his wounds shortly after.
coin	Irene Εἰρήνη	19 August 797 – 31 October 802 (5 years, 2 months and 12 days)	Born c. 752 in Athens, she married Leo IV on 3 November 768 and was crowned empress on 17 December. Regent for her son Constantine VI in 780–790, she dethroned and blinded him in 797 and became empress-regnant. In 787, she called the Second Council of Nicaea which condemned the practice of iconoclasm and restored the veneration of icons to Christian practice. Deposed in a palace coup in 802, she was exiled and died on 9 August 803.

== Nikephorian dynasty (802–813) ==
Nikephorian dynasty
Portrait	Name	Reign	Notes
miniature portrait	Nikephoros I "the Logothete" Νικηφόρος	31 October 802 – 26 July 811 (8 years, 8 months and 26 days)	Logothetes tou genikou (general finance minister) under Irene, led initially successful campaigns against the Bulgars but was killed at the Battle of Pliska.
coin	Staurakios Σταυράκιος	28 July – 2 October 811 (2 months and 4 days)	Only son of Nikephoros I, crowned co-emperor in December 803. Succeeded on his father's death; however, he had been heavily wounded at Pliska and left paralyzed. He was forced to abdicate and retired to a monastery, where he died soon after.
miniature portrait	Michael I Rangabe Μιχαὴλ	2 October 811 – 11 July 813 (1 year, 9 months and 9 days) with Theophylact and Staurakios, sons of Michael I (811–813)	Son-in-law of Nikephoros I, he succeeded Staurakios on his abdication. Resigned after the revolt under Leo the Armenian and retired to a monastery, where he died on 11 January 844. Reigned with eldest son Theophylact as co-emperor.
miniature portrait	Leo V "the Armenian" Λέων	11 July 813 – 25 December 820 (7 years, 5 months and 14 days) with Constantine Symbatios (813–820)	General of Armenian origin, born c. 755. He rebelled against Michael I and became emperor. Appointed his son Symbatios co-emperor under the name of Constantine in 813. Revived Byzantine Iconoclasm. Murdered by a conspiracy led by Michael the Amorian.

== Amorian dynasty (820–867) ==
Amorian dynasty
Portrait	Name	Reign	Notes
miniature portrait	Michael II "the Amorian" Μιχαὴλ	25 December 820 – 2 October 829 (8 years, 9 months and 7 days)	Born in 770 at Amorium, he became an army officer. A friend of Leo V, he was raised to high office but led the conspiracy that murdered him. He was sentenced to execution by Leo, but was proclaimed emperor by Leo's assassins and crowned by Patriarch Theodotus I on the same day. He survived the rebellion of Thomas the Slav, lost Crete to the Arabs, faced the beginning of the Muslim conquest of Sicily, and reinforced iconoclasm.
miniature portrait	Theophilos Θεόφιλος	2 October 829 – 20 January 842 (12 years, 3 months and 18 days) with Constantine (c. 834–835)	Born in 813 as the only son of Michael II. Crowned co-emperor on 12 May 821, he succeeded on his father's death.
miniature portrait	Michael III "the Drunkard" Μιχαὴλ	20 January 842 – 24 September 867 (25 years, 8 months and 4 days) with Thekla (842–856)	His precise date of birth is uncertain, but the balance of available evidence supports a birthdate in January 840. The son of Theophilos, he succeeded on Theophilos' death. Under the regency of his mother Theodora until 856, and under the effective control of his uncle Bardas in 862–866. Ended iconoclasm. Murdered by Basil the Macedonian. A pleasure-loving ruler, he was nicknamed "the Drunkard" by later, pro-Basil chroniclers.

== Macedonian dynasty (867–1059) ==
Macedonian dynasty
Portrait	Name	Reign	Notes
miniature portrait	Basil I "the Macedonian" Βασίλειος	24 September 867 – 29 August 886 (18 years, 11 months and 5 days) with Constantine (868–879)	Born in the Theme of Macedonia c. 811, he rose in prominence through palace service, becoming a favorite of Michael III, who crowned him co-emperor on 26 May 866. He overthrew Michael and established the Macedonian dynasty. He led successful wars in the East against the Arabs and the Paulicians, and recovered southern Italy for the Empire.
mosaic	Leo VI "the Wise" Λέων	29 August 886 – 11 May 912 (25 years, 8 months and 12 days)	Born on 19 September 866, either the legitimate son of Basil I or the illegitimate son of Michael III. Co-emperor since 6 January 870. Leo was known for his erudition. His reign saw a height in Saracen (Muslim) naval raids, culminating in the Sack of Thessalonica, and was marked by unsuccessful wars against the Bulgarians under Simeon I.
mosaic	Alexander Αλέξανδρος	11 May 912 – 6 June 913 (1 year and 26 days)	Son of Basil I, Alexander was born in 870 and raised to co-emperor in 879. Sidelined by Leo VI, Alexander dismissed his brother's principal aides on his accession. Died of illness, possibly testicular cancer
carved portrait	Constantine VII Porphyrogenitus Κωνσταντῖνος	6 June 913 – 9 November 959 (46 years, 5 months and 3 days)	Son of Leo VI, he was born on 17/18 May 905 and raised to co-emperor on 15 May 908. His early reign was dominated by successive regencies, first by his mother, Zoe Karbonopsina, and Patriarch Nicholas Mystikos, and from 919 by the admiral Romanos Lekapenos, who wedded his daughter to Constantine and was crowned senior emperor in 920. Constantine reasserted his control by deposing Romanos's sons on 27 January 945. His reign was marked by struggles with Sayf al-Dawla in the East, an unsuccessful campaign against Crete, and pro-aristocratic policies that saw a partial reversal of Lekapenos' legislation against the dynatoi. He is notable for promoting the "Macedonian Renaissance", sponsoring encyclopedic works and histories. He was a prolific writer himself, best remembered for the manuals on statecraft (De administrando imperio) and ceremonies (De ceremoniis) he compiled for his son.
seal	Romanos I Lekapenos Ῥωμανὸς	17 December 920 – 20 December 944 (24 years and 3 days) with Christopher (921–931), Stephen and Constantine Lekapenos (924–945)	An admiral of lowly origin, Romanos rose to power as a protector of the young Constantine VII against the general Leo Phokas the Elder. He became emperor in 920. His reign was marked by the end of warfare with Bulgaria and the great conquests of John Kourkouas in the East. Romanos promoted his sons Stephen and Constantine (alongside Christopher, who died soon after) as co-emperors over Constantine VII, but was himself overthrown by them and confined to an island as a monk. He died there on 15 June 948.
carved portrait	Romanos II Ῥωμανὸς	9 November 959 – 15 March 963 (3 years, 4 months and 6 days)	The only surviving son of Constantine VII, he was born on 15 March 938 and succeeded his father on the latter's death. He ruled until his own death, although the government was led mostly by the eunuch Joseph Bringas. His reign was marked by successful warfare in the East against Sayf al-Dawla and the recovery of Crete by general Nikephoros Phokas.
miniature portrait	Nikephoros II Phokas Νικηφόρος	16 August 963 – 11 December 969 (6 years, 3 months and 25 days)	The most successful general of his generation, Nikephoros II was born c. 912 to the powerful Phokas clan. After the death of Romanos II, he rose to the throne as regent for the young emperors Basil II and Constantine VIII, marrying the empress-dowager Theophano with the support of the army and people. Throughout his reign, he led campaigns in the East, conquering much of Syria. He was murdered by his nephew and one-time associate, John Tzimiskes.
miniature portrait	John I Tzimiskes Ἰωάννης	11 December 969 – 10 January 976 (6 years and 30 days)	Nephew of Nikephoros Phokas, Tzimiskes was born c. 925. A successful general, he fell out with his uncle and led a conspiracy of disgruntled generals who murdered him. Tzimiskes succeeded Nikephoros as emperor and regent for the young sons of Romanos II. As ruler, Tzimiskes crushed the Rus' in Bulgaria and ended the Bulgarian tsardom before going on to campaign in the East, where he died.
miniature portrait	Basil II "the Bulgar-Slayer" Βασίλειος	10 January 976 – 15 December 1025 (49 years, 11 months and 5 days)	Eldest son of Romanos II, Basil II was born in 958 to Romanus II. The first decade of his reign was marked by rivalry with the powerful Basil Lekapenos, an unsuccessful war against Bulgaria, and rebellions by generals in Asia Minor. Basil solidified his position through a marriage alliance of his sister Anna to Vladimir I of Kiev, which was accompanied by the conversion to Christian Orthodoxy of the grand Kievian Rus' prince and his people. After over 20 years of war, Basil eventually succeeded in his conquest of Bulgaria, which was finally subdued in 1018, earning him the name "Bulgar-slayer". His conquest of Bulgaria was periodically interrupted by warfare in Syria against the Fatimid Caliphate. Basil expanded Byzantine control over most of Armenia, and his reign is widely considered as the apogee of medieval Byzantium.
miniature portrait	Constantine VIII Κωνσταντῖνος	15 December 1025 – 12 November 1028 (2 years, 10 months and 28 days)	The second son of Romanos II, Constantine, was born in 960 and raised to co-emperor on 30 March 962. During Basil II's rule, he spent his time in idle pleasure. During his short reign, he was an indifferent ruler, easily influenced by his courtiers and suspicious of plots to depose him, especially among the military aristocracy, many of whom were blinded and exiled.
miniature portrait	Romanos III Argyros Ῥωμανὸς	12 November 1028 – 11 April 1034 (5 years, 4 months and 30 days)	Born in 968, the elderly aristocrat Romanos—who had served in both the judiciary and civil service—was chosen by Constantine VIII on his deathbed, after being required to marry the emperor's daughter Zoe under the alternative threat of being blinded and sent to a monastery. Romanos III succeeded to the throne a few days later after Constantine's death. Deluded by grandeur, Romanos fashioned himself at one time as a philosopher king like Marcus Aurelius and later as a military genius like Trajan, resulting in military debacles. He initiated expensive church building projects. A subsequent affair between his wife Zoe and his chief eunuch's brother Michael led to the pair colluding in poisoning Romanos, before ultimately resolving to have the emperor strangled and drowned in his own bath.
miniature portrait	Michael IV "the Paphlagonian" Μιχαὴλ	12 April 1034 – 10 December 1041 (7 years, 7 months and 28 days)	Born in 1010, he became a lover of Zoe even while Romanos III was alive, and succeeded him upon his death as her husband and emperor. Aided by his older brother, the eunuch John the Orphanotrophos, his reign was moderately successful against internal rebellions, but his attempt to recover Sicily failed. He died after a long illness.
miniature portrait	Michael V "Kalaphates" Μιχαὴλ	13 December 1041 – 21 April 1042 (4 months and 8 days)	Born in 1015, he was the nephew and adopted son of Michael IV. During his reign, he tried to sideline Zoe, but a popular revolt forced him to restore her as empress on 19 April 1042, along with her sister Theodora. He was deposed the next day, castrated and tonsured, dying on 24 August 1042.
mosaic	Zoë Porphyrogenita Ζωή	21 April – 11 June 1042 (1 month and 21 days)	The daughter of Constantine VIII, she succeeded on her father's death, as the only surviving member of the Macedonian dynasty, along with her sister Theodora. Her three husbands, Romanos III (1028–1034), Michael IV (1034–1041) and Constantine IX (1042–1050) ruled alongside her.
Portrait from the Monomachos crown	Theodora Porphyrogenita Θεοδώρα	21 April – 11 June 1042 (1 month and 21 days)	The younger sister of Zoe, born in 984, she was raised as co-ruler on 19 April 1042. After Zoe married her third husband, Constantine IX, in June 1042, Theodora was again sidelined. After Zoe died in 1050 and Constantine in 1055, Theodora assumed full governance of the Empire and reigned until her death. She nominated Michael VI as her successor.
mosaic	Constantine IX Monomachos Κωνσταντῖνος Μονομάχος (Note: Emperors began to officially use family names from Constantine IX Monomachos onwards. The sole exception after Constantine IX's reign is Michael VI, whose family name (Bringas) was far less distinguished than those of the other imperial families and thus does not appear in official use.)	11 June 1042 – 11 January 1055 (12 years and 7 months)	Born c. 1000 of noble origin, he had an undistinguished life but was exiled to Lesbos by Michael IV, returning when he was chosen as Zoe's third husband. Constantine supported the mercantile classes and favored the company of intellectuals, thereby alienating the military aristocracy. A pleasure-loving ruler, he lived an extravagant life with his favourite mistresses and endowed a number of monasteries, chiefly the Nea Moni of Chios and the Mangana Monastery. His reign was marked by invasions by the Pechenegs in the Balkans and the Seljuk Turks in the East, the revolts of George Maniakes and Leo Tornikios, and the Great Schism between the patriarchates of Rome and Constantinople.
Portrait from the Monomachos crown	Theodora Porphyrogenita Θεοδώρα (second reign)	11 January 1055 – 31 August 1056 (1 year, 7 months and 20 days)	Claimed the throne again after Constantine IX's death as the last living member of the Macedonian dynasty. Died of natural causes
coin	Michael VI Bringas "Stratiotikos" Μιχαήλ	22 August 1056 – 30 August 1057 (1 year and 8 days)	A court bureaucrat and stratiotikos logothetes (hence his first sobriquet). Proclaimed emperor by Theodora on her deathbed on 22 August 1056. Deposed by military revolt under Isaac Komnenos, he retired to a monastery where he died in 1059.
coin	Isaac I Komnenos Ἰσαάκιος Κομνηνός	1 September 1057 – 22 November 1059 (2 years, 2 months and 21 days)	Born c. 1005. A successful general, he rose in revolt, leading the eastern armies, and was declared emperor on 8 June 1057; he was recognized after the abdication of Michael. He resigned in 1059 and died c. 1061.

== Doukas dynasty (1059–1078) ==
(§) – Varying ascribed status (Note: Some historians regard Eudokia as an empress regnant, while others consider her as a regent.)

Doukas dynasty
Portrait	Name	Reign	Notes
miniature portrait	Constantine X Doukas Κωνσταντῖνος Δούκας	23 November 1059 – 23 May 1067 (7 years and 6 months)	Born in 1006, he became a general and close ally of Isaac Komnenos, and succeeded him as emperor on his abdication. Named his sons Michael, Andronikos and Konstantios as co-emperors. After his death his widow was regent until the accession of Romanus IV.
miniature portrait	Eudokia Makrembolitissa (§) Εὐδοκία Μακρεμβολίτισσα	23 May – 31 December 1067 (7 months and 8 days)	Widow of Constantine X; ruler in her own right on behalf of their sons until her marriage to Romanos IV.
coin	Romanos IV Diogenes Ῥωμανὸς Διογένης	1 January 1068 – 26 August 1071 (3 years, 7 months and 25 days) with Leo and Nikephoros Diogenes (c. 1070–71) (Note: Unattested in coinage; Leo is only called emperor in a singular letter, while his brother's status can only be deduced from the fact that he was born in the purple and that he also used the "imperial tokens".)	Born in 1032, a successful general, he married empress-dowager Eudokia Makrembolitissa and became senior emperor as guardian of her sons by Constantine X. Deposed by the Doukas partisans after the Battle of Manzikert, blinded in June 1072 and exiled. He died soon after.
miniature portrait	Eudokia Makrembolitissa (§) Εὐδοκία Μακρεμβολίτισσα (second reign)	1 October – 1 November 1071 (1 month)	Briefly resumed her rule as co-ruler of Michael VII in 1071, became a nun in November 1071, and later died of natural causes.
portrait from the Holy Crown of Hungary	Michael VII Doukas "Parapinakes" Μιχαὴλ Δούκας	1 October 1071 – 24/31 March 1078 (6 years, 5 months and 23/30 days) with Konstantios (1060–1078), Andronikos (1068–1070s) and Constantine Doukas (1074–78; 1st time)	Born in 1050 as the eldest son of Constantine X, Co-emperor since 1059, he succeeded on his father's death. Due to his minority, he was under the regency of his mother, Eudokia Makrembolitissa, in 1067–1068, and relegated to junior emperor under her second husband, Romanos IV Diogenes in 1068–71. Senior emperor in 1071–78, he named his son Constantine co-emperor alongside his brothers. He abdicated before the revolt of Nikephoros Botaneiates, retired to a monastery, and died c. 1090. His reign saw a 25% the devaluation of the Byzantine currency, hence his nickname "minus-a-quarter".
miniature portrait	Nikephoros III Botaneiates Νικηφόρος Βοτανειάτης	3 April 1078 – 1 April 1081 (2 years, 11 months and 29 days)	Born in 1001, he was the strategos of the Anatolic Theme. He was proclaimed emperor on 7 January and crowned on 27 March or 3 April. He weathered several revolts, but was overthrown by the Komnenos clan. He retired to a monastery where he died in the same year.

== Komnenos dynasty (1081–1185) ==
Komnenos dynasty
Portrait	Name	Reign	Notes
miniature portrait	Alexios I Komnenos Ἀλέξιος Κομνηνός	1 April 1081 – 15 August 1118 (37 years, 4 months and 14 days) with Constantine Doukas (1081–1087; 2nd time)	Born in 1056, a nephew of Isaac I Komnenos. A distinguished general, he overthrew Nikephoros III. His reign was dominated by wars against the Normans and the Seljuk Turks, as well as the arrival of the First Crusade and the establishment of independent Crusader states. He retained Constantine Doukas as co-emperor until 1087 and named his eldest son John co-emperor in 1092.
mosaic	John II Komnenos "the Good" Ἰωάννης Κομνηνός	15 August 1118 – 8 April 1143 (24 years, 7 months and 24 days) with Alexios Komnenos, son of John II (1119–1142)	Born on 13 September 1087 as the eldest son of Alexios I. Co-emperor since 1092, he succeeded upon his father's death. His reign was focused on wars with the Turks. A popular, pious and frugal ruler, he was known as "John the Good". Named his eldest son Alexios co-emperor in 1122, but the son predeceased his father.
miniature portrait	Manuel I Komnenos "the Great" Μανουὴλ Κομνηνός	8 April 1143 – 24 September 1180 (37 years, 5 months and 16 days)	Born on 28 November 1118 as the fourth and youngest son of John II, he was chosen as emperor over his elder brother Isaac by his father on his deathbed. An energetic ruler, he launched campaigns against the Turks, humbled Hungary, achieved supremacy over the Crusader states, and tried unsuccessfully to recover Italy and Egypt. His extravagance and constant campaigning, however, depleted the Empire's resources.
miniature portrait	Alexios II Komnenos Ἀλέξιος Κομνηνός	24 September 1180 – c. September 1183 (3 years)	Born on 14 September 1169 as the only son of Manuel I. In 1180–1182, under the regency of his mother, Maria of Antioch. She was overthrown by Andronikos I Komnenos, who became co-emperor and had Alexios II, aged 14, strangled and his body thrown in the sea
miniature portrait	Andronikos I Komnenos Ἀνδρόνικος Κομνηνός	c. September 1183 – 12 September 1185 (2 years) with John Komnenos, son of Andronikos I (1183–1185)	Born c. 1118, a nephew of John II by his brother Isaac. A general, he was imprisoned for conspiring against John II, but escaped and spent 15 years in exile in various courts in Eastern Europe and the Middle East. He seized the regency from Maria of Antioch in 1182 and subsequently the throne from his nephew Alexios II. An unpopular ruler, he was overthrown by Isaac II, tortured and mutilated in the imperial palace, then slowly dismembered alive by a mob in the Hippodrome

== Angelos dynasty (1185–1204) ==
(§) – Varying ascribed status (Note: Some historians regard Kanabos as an emperor, while others consider him solely as an emperor elect.)

Angelos dynasty
Portrait	Name	Reign	Notes
miniature portrait	Isaac II Angelos Ἰσαάκιος Κομνηνός Ἄγγελος	12 September 1185 – 8 April 1195 (9 years, 6 months and 27 days); 1 August 1203 – 27 January 1204 (5 months and 26 days)	Born in September 1156, Isaac came to the throne at the head of a popular revolt against Andronikos I. His reign was marked by revolts and wars in the Balkans, especially against a resurgent Bulgaria. He was deposed, blinded and imprisoned by his elder brother, Alexios III. He was later restored to the throne by the Crusaders and Alexios IV. Due to their failure to deal with the Crusaders' demands, he was deposed by Alexios V Doukas in January 1204 and died in January 1204, perhaps of poison.
miniature portrait	Alexios III Angelos Ἀλέξιος Κομνηνός (Note: Alexios III used the name Alexios Komnenos Angelos (Ἀλέξιος Κομνηνός Ἄγγελος) prior to his accession but reigned as Alexios Komnenos, dropping his own family name in order to stress his matrilineal descent from the Komnenos dynasty.)	8 April 1195 – 17/18 July 1203 (8 years, 3 months and 10 days)	Born in 1153, Alexios was the elder brother of Isaac II. His reign was marked by misgovernment and the increasing autonomy of provincial magnates. He was deposed by the Fourth Crusade and fled Constantinople, roaming Greece and Asia Minor, in search of support to regain his throne. He died in Nicaean captivity (confined to a monastery) in 1211.
miniature portrait	Alexios IV Angelos Ἀλέξιος Ἄγγελος	19 July 1203 – 27 January 1204 (6 months and 8 days)	Born in 1182, the son of Isaac II. He enlisted in the Fourth Crusade to return his father to the throne and reigned alongside his restored father from 19 July 1203. Due to their failure to deal with the Crusaders' demands, he was deposed by Alexios V Doukas in January 1204 and was strangled in prison on 8 February.
—	Nicholas Kanabos (§) Νικόλαος Καναβός	25 January 1204 – 2 February 1204 (8 days)	Young noble elected Byzantine emperor during the Fourth Crusade on 25 January 1204 by an assembly of the Byzantine Senate, priests, and the mob of Constantinople in direct opposition to co-emperors Isaac II and Alexios IV, but never accepted imperial power and took sanctuary in the bowels of Hagia Sophia. Executed by Alexios V in early February after his refusal to join his administration.
miniature portrait	Alexios V Doukas "Mourtzouphlos" Ἀλέξιος Δούκας	27/28 January – 12 April 1204 (2 months and 16 days)	Born in 1140, the son-in-law of Alexios III and a prominent aristocrat, he deposed Isaac II and Alexios IV in a palace coup. He tried to repel the Crusaders, but they captured Constantinople, forcing Mourtzouphlos to flee. He joined the exiled Alexios III, but was later blinded by the latter. Captured by crusader Thierry de Loos, he was thrown from the Column of Theodosius

== Laskaris dynasty (1205–1261) ==
(§) – Varying ascribed status

Note: Roman rule in Constantinople was interrupted with the capture and sack of the city by the crusaders in 1204, which led to the establishment of the Frankokratia. Though the crusaders created a new line of Latin emperors in the city, modern historians recognize the line of emperors of the Laskaris dynasty, reigning in Nicaea, as the legitimate Roman emperors during the struggle for Constantinople because the Nicene Empire eventually retook the city. For other lines of claimant emperors, see List of Trapezuntine emperors and List of Thessalonian emperors.

Laskaris dynasty
Portrait	Name	Reign	Notes
coin	Constantine Laskaris (§) Κωνσταντίνος Κομνηνὸς Λάσκαρις	12–13 April 1204 (less than a day)	Born c. 1170, proclaimed emperor after the crusaders entered Constantinople in 1204, but never accepted imperial power. He marched out to make a final stand. However, not even the Varangian Guard could be inspired to prolong the fight. Seeing all was lost, he quickly fled the capital with his brother, Theodore, in the early hours of 13 April and the brothers, along with a crowd of refugees, sailed to the Asian side of Bosporus.
miniature portrait	Theodore I Laskaris Θεόδωρος Κομνηνὸς Λάσκαρις	c. May 1205 – November 1221 (16 years and 6 months) with Nicholas Laskaris (1208–1210)	Born c. 1174, he rose to prominence as a son-in-law of Alexios III. His brother Constantine Laskaris (or Theodore himself, it is uncertain) was elected emperor by the citizens of Constantinople on the day before the city fell to the Crusaders; Constantine only remained for a few hours before the sack of the city and later fled to Nicaea, where Theodore organized the Greek resistance to the Latins. Proclaimed emperor after Constantine's death in 1205, Theodore was crowned only on Easter 1208. He managed to stop the Latin advance in Asia and to repel Seljuk attacks, establishing the Empire of Nicaea as the strongest of the Greek successor states.
miniature portrait	John III Vatatzes Ἰωάννης Δούκας Βατάτζης	c. December 1221 – 3 November 1254 (32 years and 11 months)	Born c. 1192, he became the son-in-law and successor of Theodore I in 1212. A capable ruler and soldier, he expanded his state in Bithynia, Thrace, and Macedonia at the expense of the Latin Empire, Bulgaria, and the rival Greek state of Epirus.
miniature portrait	Theodore II Laskaris Θεόδωρος Δούκας Λάσκαρις	3 November 1254 – 16 August 1258 (3 years, 9 months and 13 days)	Born in 1221/1222 as the only son of John III, he succeeded on his father's death. His reign was marked by his hostility towards the major houses of the aristocracy and by his victory against Bulgaria and the subsequent expansion into Albania.
miniature portrait	John IV Laskaris Ἰωάννης Δούκας Λάσκαρις	16 August 1258 – 25 December 1261 (3 years, 4 months and 9 days)	Born on 25 December 1250 as the only son of Theodore II, he succeeded on his father's death. Due to his minority, the regency was exercised at first by George Mouzalon until his assassination, and then by Michael Palaiologos, who, within months, was crowned senior emperor. After the recovery of Constantinople in August 1261, Palaiologos sidelined John IV completely, had him blinded, and imprisoned. John IV died in captivity several decades later, c. 1305.

== Palaiologos dynasty (1259–1453) ==
(§) – Varying ascribed status

Note: The Empire had up to three capitals: Selymbria, Thessalonica and Constantinople.

Palaiologos dynasty
Portrait	Name	Reign	Notes
miniature portrait	Michael VIII Palaiologos Μιχαὴλ Δούκας Ἄγγελος Κομνηνὸς Παλαιολόγος	1 January 1259 – 11 December 1282 (23 years, 11 months and 10 days)	Born in 1223, great-grandson of Alexios III, grandnephew of John III by marriage. Senior emperor alongside John IV in 1259. His forces reconquered Constantinople on 25 July 1261, thus restoring the Empire. He entered the city and was crowned on 15 August. Became sole emperor after deposing John IV on 25 December 1261.
miniature portrait	Andronikos II Palaiologos Ἀνδρόνικος Δούκας Ἄγγελος Κομνηνὸς Παλαιολόγος	11 December 1282 – 24 May 1328 (45 years, 5 months and 13 days) with Irene (1303–1317, in Thessalonica)	Son of Michael VIII, Andronikos II was born on 25 March 1259. Named co-emperor in 1261, crowned in 1272, he succeeded as sole emperor on Michael's death. Favoring monks and intellectuals, he neglected the army by significantly reducing military spending, and his reign saw the collapse of the Byzantine position in Asia Minor. He named his son Michael IX co-emperor. In a protracted civil war, he was first forced to recognize his grandson Andronikos III as co-emperor and was then deposed outright. He became a monk and died peacefully in 1332.
miniature portrait	Michael IX Palaiologos (§) Μιχαὴλ Δούκας Ἄγγελος Κομνηνὸς Παλαιολόγος	21 May 1294 – 12 October 1320 (26 years, 4 months and 21 days)	Son and co-ruler of Andronikos II, named co-emperor in 1281 but not crowned until 21 May 1294. Allegedly died of grief due to the accidental murder of his second son.
miniature portrait	Andronikos III Palaiologos Ἀνδρόνικος Δούκας Ἄγγελος Κομνηνός Παλαιολόγος	24 May 1328 – 15 June 1341 (13 years and 22 days)	Son of Michael IX, he was born on 25 March 1297 and named co-emperor in 1316. Rival emperor since July 1321, he deposed his grandfather Andronikos II in 1328 and ruled as sole emperor until his death. Supported by John Kantakouzenos, his reign saw defeats against the Ottoman emirate but successes in Europe, where Epirus and Thessaly were recovered.
miniature portrait	John V Palaiologos Ίωάννης Κομνηνός Παλαιολόγος	15 June 1341 – 12 August 1376 (35 years, 1 month and 28 days) with Anna (1351–1365, in Thessalonica) (Note: During the last years of the Empire, the territory of Thessalonica was effectively ruled as separate realm from Constantinople. Two empresses, Irene and Anna, took residence there, even having their own courts and ruling as de facto empresses regnant. Anna notably ruled in Thessalonica in opposition to John VI Kantakouzenos, who later recognized her portion of the empire.)	Son of Andronikos III, not formally crowned until 19 November 1341. Dominated by regents until 1354, faced numerous usurpations and civil wars
miniature portrait	John VI Kantakouzenos Ἰωάννης Ἄγγελος Κομνηνὸς Παλαιολόγος Καντακουζηνός	8 February 1347 – 10 December 1354 (7 years, 10 months and 2 days) with Matthew Kantakouzenos (1353–1357)	Related to the Palaiologoi through his mother. Proclaimed by the army on 26 October 1341, became regent and senior co-emperor after a lengthy civil war with John V's mother, Anna of Savoy. Entered Constantinople on 8 February, crowned on 21 May 1347
Non-contemporary	Andronikos IV Palaiologos Ἀνδρόνικος Κομνηνός Παλαιολόγος	12 August 1376 – 1 July 1379 (2 years, 10 months and 19 days); May 1381 – June 1385 (4 years, in Selymbria)	Son of John V and grandson of John VI; named co-emperor and heir in 1352, but imprisoned and partially blinded after a failed rebellion in May 1373. Rebelled again and successfully deposed his father in 1376; not formally crowned until 18 October 1377
miniature portrait	John V Palaiologos Ίωάννης Κομνηνός Παλαιολόγος (second reign)	July 1, 1379 - 14 April 1390 (10 years, 9 months and 13 days)	Restored by the Venetians after Andronikos III Palaiologos favored the Genoese.
miniature portrait	John VII Palaiologos Ίωάννης Παλαιολόγος	June 1385 – April 1390 (4 years and 10 months, in Selymbria) (Note: John VII inherited his father's lands around Selymbria and, as per a 1381 agreement with Andronikos IV that legitimized his role as co-emperor and heir. He ruled there with the title of emperor (basileus), although he ruled heavily influenced by the Ottomans and Genoese.); 14 April – 17 September 1390 (5 months and 3 days) late 1403 – 22 September 1408 (5 years, in Thessalonica) with Andronikos V Palaiologos (1403–1407)	Son of Andronikos IV, co-emperor since 1377; usurped the throne from John V in 1390. Deposed shortly thereafter but granted Thessalonica by Manuel II in 1403, from where he once more ruled as emperor until his death
miniature portrait	John V Palaiologos Ίωάννης Κομνηνός Παλαιολόγος (third reign)	17 September 1390 – 16 February 1391; September 17, 1390 – 1316 February 1391 (4 months and 30 days)	Restored after Manuel II Palaiologos returned from campaign.
miniature portrait	Manuel II Palaiologos Μανουὴλ Παλαιολόγος	1382 – 1387 (5 years, in Thessalonica); 16 February 1391 – 21 July 1425 (34 years, 4 months and 5 days)	Second son of John V, he was born on 27 June 1350. Raised to co-emperor in 1373, he became senior emperor on John V's death and ruled until his death. He journeyed to the West European courts seeking aid against the Turks, and was able to use the Ottoman defeat in the Battle of Ankara—thanks largely to the fact that Timur and the Tatars attacked the Turks when they were besieging Constantinople, which forced the Turks' retreat—to regain some territories and throw off his vassalage to them. Manuel II died in 1425 and was succeeded by his son, John VIII.
miniature portrait	John VIII Palaiologos Ίωάννης Παλαιολόγος	21 July 1425 – 31 October 1448 (23 years, 4 months and 10 days)	Eldest surviving son of Manuel II, he was born on 18 December 1392. Raised to co-emperor around 1416 and named full autokrator in 1425, he succeeded his father on his death. Seeking aid against the resurgent Ottomans, he ratified the Union of the Churches in 1439, a move to reunite the Orthodox and Catholic churches that proved very unpopular in Constantinople.
miniature portrait	Constantine XI Palaiologos Κωνσταντῖνος Δραγάσης Παλαιολόγος	6 January 1449 – 29 May 1453 (4 years, 4 months and 23 days)	The fourth son of Manuel II and Serbian princess Helena Dragaš, he was born on 8 February 1405. As Despot of the Morea since 1428, he distinguished himself in campaigns that annexed the Principality of Achaea and brought the Duchy of Athens under temporary Byzantine suzerainty, but was unable to repel Turkish attacks under Turahan Bey. As the eldest surviving brother, he succeeded John VIII after the latter's death. Facing the designs of the new sultan, Mehmed II, on Constantinople, Constantine acknowledged the Union of the Churches and made repeated appeals for help to the West, but in vain. Refusing to surrender the city, he was killed in battle during the Fall of Constantinople on 29 May 1453.

== See also ==
- Family tree of Byzantine emperors
- List of Roman emperors
- List of Trapezuntine emperors
- List of Roman usurpers
- List of Byzantine usurpers
- Succession to the Byzantine Empire
- Ottoman claim to Roman succession
- List of Roman and Byzantine empresses
- List of Byzantine emperors of Armenian origin
- Family tree of Roman emperors
- History of the Byzantine Empire

== Bibliography ==
- Angelov, Dimiter (2019). The Byzantine Hellene: The Life of Emperor Theodore Laskaris and Byzantium in the Thirteenth Century. Cambridge: Cambridge University Press. ISBN 978-1-1084-8071-0.
- "Byzantine Empire, Last Emperor, Ottoman War". Encyclopedia Britannica. 20 July 1998.
- Cameron, Alan (1988). "Flavius: a Nicety of Protocol". Latomus. 47 (1): 26–33. JSTOR 41540754.
- Choniates, Niketas (1984) [1207]. Annals of Niketas Choniates. Translated by Harry J. Magoulias. Wayne State University Press.
- Cotsonis, John A. (2020). The Religious Figural Imagery of Byzantine Lead Seals I. Oxford: Routledge. ISBN 978-0-3673-4696-6.
- Croke, Brian (2004). "The Imperial Reigns of Leo II". Byzantinische Zeitschrift. 96 (2): 559–575. doi:10.1515/BYZS.2003.559. S2CID 191460505.
- Elton, Hugh (2018). The Roman Empire in Late Antiquity: A Political and Military History. Cambridge and New York: Cambridge University Press. ISBN 978-1-10845-631-9.
- Foss, Clive (2005). "Emperors named Constantine". Revue numismatique. 6 (161): 93–102. doi:10.3406/numi.2005.2594.
- Grant, Michael (1985). The Roman Emperors: A Biographical Guide to the Rulers of Imperial Rome, 31 BC–AD 476. New York: Charles Scribner's Sons. ISBN 0-6841-8388-9.
- Gregory, Timothy E. (2005). A History of Byzantium. Malden, MA; Oxford, UK: Blackwell Publishing. ISBN 978-0-63123-513-2.
- Grierson, Philip (1973). Catalogue of Byzantine Coins, vol. 3: Leo III to Nicephorus III, 717-1081. Washington D.C.: Dumbarton Oaks. ISBN 0-8840-2012-6.
- Hooker, Richard (2007). "European Middle Ages: The Byzantine Empire". Washington State University. Archived from the original on 24 February 1999.
- Jones, A. H. M.; Martindale, J. R.; Morris, John, eds. (1971–1992). The Prosopography of the Later Roman Empire. Cambridge: Cambridge University Press. (see PLRE)
- Kaegi, Walter E. (2003). Heraclius, Emperor of Byzantium. Cambridge: Cambridge University Press. ISBN 0-5218-1459-6.
- Kaldellis, Anthony (2024). The New Roman Empire: A History of Byzantium. Oxford and New York: Oxford University Press. ISBN 978-0-19754-932-2.
- Karayannopoulous, Yanis (2000). "State Organization, Social Structure, Economy, and Commerce". In M.A. Al-Bakhit; L. Bazin; S.M. Cissoko; M.S. Asimov (eds.). History of Humanity: Scientific and Cultural Development from the Seventh to the Sixteenth Centuries. Vol. IV. Paris: UNESCO. ISBN 978-9-23102-813-7.
- Kazhdan, Alexander, ed. (1991). Oxford Dictionary of Byzantium. Oxford: Oxford University Press. ISBN 978-0-1950-4652-6. (see ODB)
- Kienast, Dietmar; Werner Eck & Matthäus Heil (2017) [1990]. Römische Kaisertabelle: Grundzüge einer römischen Kaiserchronologie [Roman imperial table: Basics of the Roman imperial chronology] (in German) (6th ed.). Darmstadt: WBG. ISBN 978-3-5342-6724-8.
- Kulikowski, Michael (2019). The Tragedy of Empire: From Constantine to the Destruction of Roman Italy. Cambridge, MA: The Belknap Press of Harvard University Press. ISBN 978-0-67466-013-7.
- Lascaratos, J. (1999). ""Eyes" on the Thrones: Imperial Ophthalmologic Nicknames". Survey of Ophthalmology. 44 (1): 73–78. doi:10.1016/S0039-6257(99)00039-9. ISSN 0039-6257. PMID 10466590.
- Lee, A.D. (2013). From Rome to Byzantium AD 363 to 565: The Transformation of Ancient Rome. Edinburgh: Edinburgh University Press. ISBN 978-0-74862-790-5.
- Louth, Andrew (2008). "Byzantium Transforming (600–700)". In Jonathan Shepard (ed.). The Cambridge History of the Byzantine Empire. New York & Cambridge: Cambridge University Press. pp. 221–250. ISBN 978-0-52183-231-1.
- Lygo, Kevin (2022). The Emperors of Byzantium. London: Thames & Hudson. ISBN 978-0-50002-329-7.
- Macrides, Ruth (2013). Pseudo-Kodinos and the Constantinopolitan Court. Ashgate. ISBN 978-0-7546-6752-0.
- Mitchell, Stephen (2015). A History of the Later Roman Empire, AD 284–641 (2nd ed.). Oxford and Malden, MA: Wiley Blackwell. ISBN 978-1-11831-242-1.
- Morgan, Giles (2007). Byzantium. Harpenden: Pocket Essentials. ISBN 978-1-90404-883-1.
- Morrisson, Cécile (2013). "Displaying the Emperor's Authority and Kharaktèr on the Marketplace". In Pamela Armstrong (ed.). Authority in Byzantium. New York: Routledge. pp. 65–82. ISBN 978-1-40943-608-9.
- Nicol, Donald M. (1993). Last Centuries of Byzantium, 1261–1453. London: University of London. ISBN 978-0-52143-991-6.
- Norwich, John Julius (1989). Byzantium: The Early Centuries. Guild Publishing. ISBN 978-0-39453-778-8.
- Oikonomides, Nicolas (1977). "John VII Palaeologus and the Ivory Pyxis at Dumbarton Oaks". Dumbarton Oaks Papers. 31: 329–337. doi:10.2307/1291411. JSTOR 1291411.
- Omissi, Adrastos (2018). Emperors and Usurpers in the Later Roman Empire. Oxford: Oxford University Press. ISBN 978-0-1988-2482-4.
- Ostrogorski, Georgije (1969). History of the Byzantine State. New Brunswick, NJ.: Rutgers University Press. OCLC 812752850.
- Pohlsander, Hans A. (1996). The Emperor Constantine. London and New York: Routledge. ISBN 0-203-34042-6.
- Lilie, Ralph-Johannes; et al. (2001–2016). Prosopography of the Byzantine World.
- Salway, Benet (1994). "What's in a Name? A Survey of Roman Onomastic Practice from c. 700 B.C. to A.D. 700". Journal of Roman Studies. 84: 137–140. doi:10.2307/300873. JSTOR 300873. S2CID 162435434.
- Sarris, Peter (2023). Justinian: Emperor, Soldier, Saint. New York: Basic Books. ISBN 978-0-213-76478-4.
- Savignac, David (2020). "The Medieval Russian Account of the Fourth Crusade - A New Annotated Translation".
- Schreiner, Peter (1977). Die byzantinischen Kleinchroniken II: Historischer Kommentar [Byzantine small chronicles 2: Historical commentary]. CFHB (in German). Vienna: ÖAW. ISBN 978-3-7001-0206-9.
- Seibt, Werner (2018). "Wer war Niketas Nobellisimos und Komes von Opsikion (8. Jahrhundert)?" [Who was Niketas Nobellisimos and Komes of Opsikion (8th century)?] (PDF). Jahrbuch der Österreichischen Byzantinistik (in German). 67: 213–216. doi:10.1553/joeb67s213.
- Skylitzes, John (2010). A Synopsis of Byzantine History, 811–1057. Translated by John Wortley. Cambridge and New York: Cambridge University Press. ISBN 978-0-52176-705-7.
- Stephenson, Paul (2022). New Rome: The Empire in the East. Cambridge, MA: The Belknap Press of Harvard University Press. ISBN 978-0-67465-962-9.
- Tilemachos, Lounghis (2015). "Review Article: Juan Signes Codoner, The emperor Theophilos and the East, 829-842: Court and frontier in Byzantium during the last phase of Iconoclasm, Birmingham Byzantine and Ottoman Studies, vol 13, Ashgate 2014". Byzantina Symmeikta. 25: 237–260. doi:10.12681/byzsym.8773.
- Trapp, Erich, ed. (2001). Prosopographisches Lexikon der Palaiologenzeit [Prosopographical Lexicon of the Palaiologan era] (in German). Vienna: ÖAW. ISBN 978-3-7001-1462-8. (see PLP)
- Treadgold, Warren (1997). A History of the Byzantine State and Society. Stanford: Stanford University Press. ISBN 978-0-8047-2630-6.
- Vagi, David L. (1999). Coinage and History of the Roman Empire: c. 82 B.C. – A.D. 480. Volume I: History. London: Routledge. ISBN 978-1-1389-9907-7.
- Wickham, Chris (2009). The Inheritance of Rome: Illuminating the Dark Ages, 400–1000. Viking. ISBN 978-0-67002-098-0.
