= List of Byzantine emperors of Armenian origin =

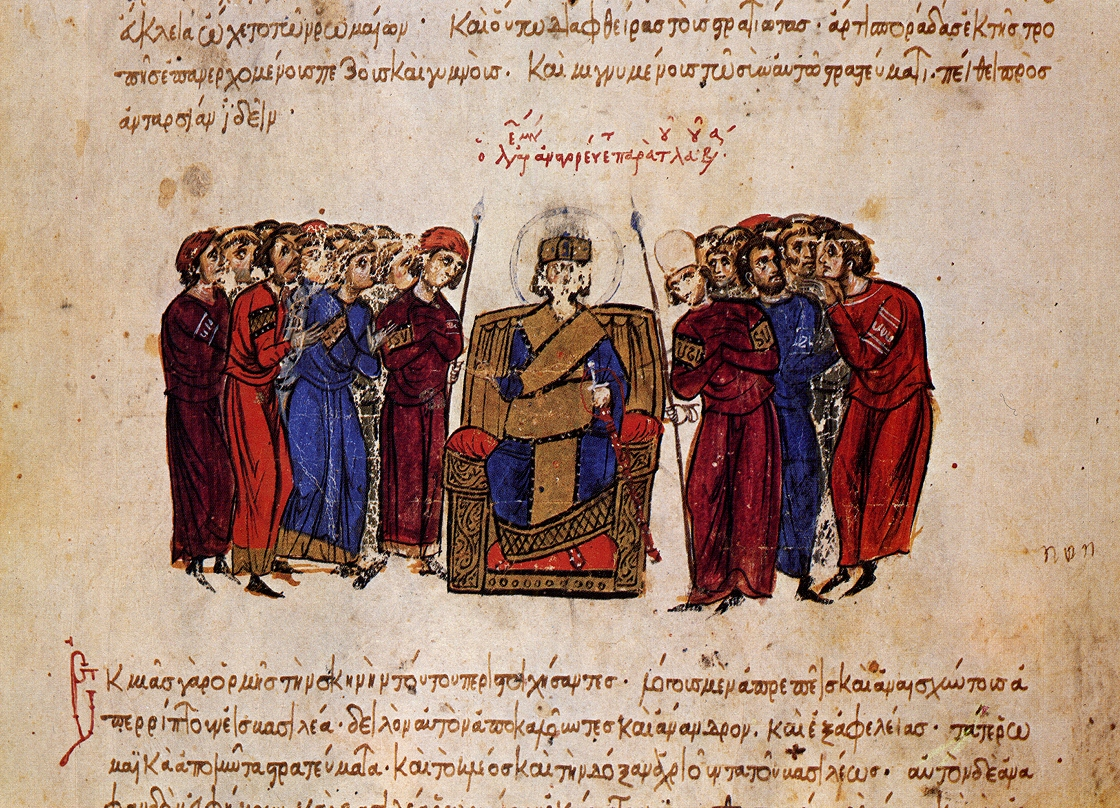
Leo V the Armenian (from the Madrid Skylitzes) is the only Byzantine emperor to be nicknamed "Armenian" by Byzantine chroniclers.

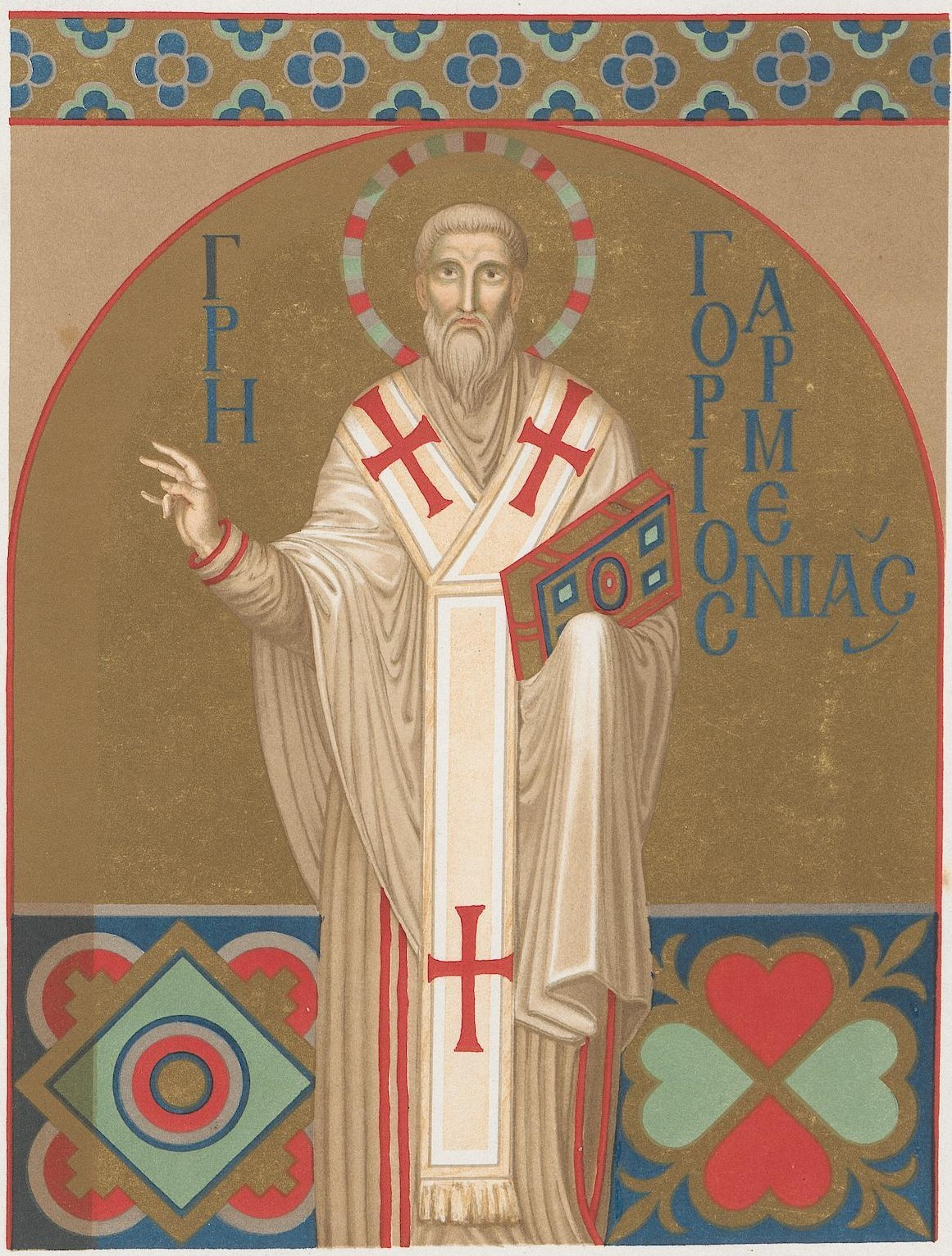
This now-lost mosaic of Gregory the Illuminator, Armenia's patron saint, in Hagia Sophia of Constantinople, next to the Church Fathers, may had been created in support of the myth of the Arsacid origin of Basil I, likely fabricated by Patriarch Photios I of Constantinople.

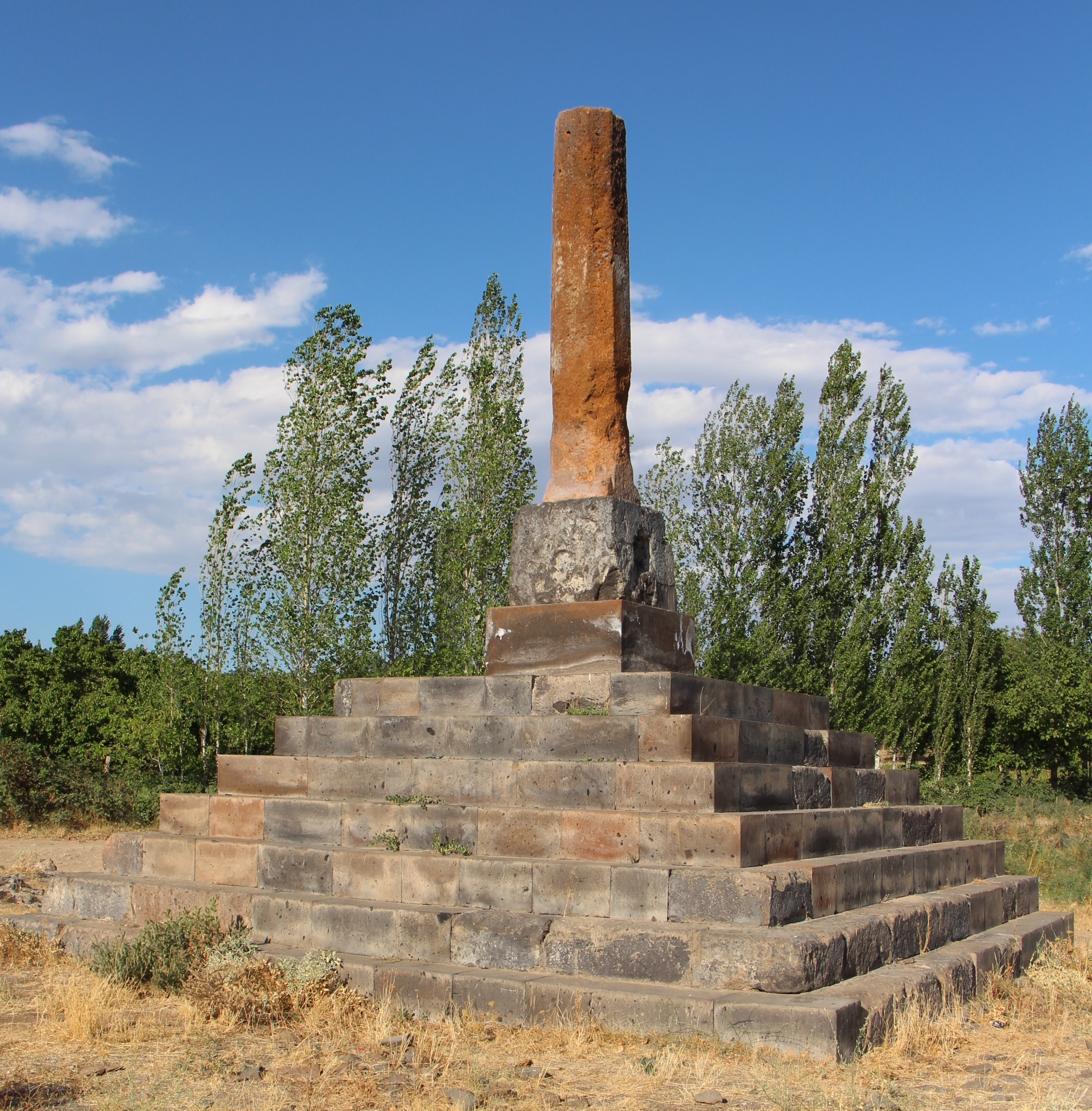
This 7th century obelisk in Oshakan, Armenia is attributed by a local tradition to emperor Maurice or his mother.

According to medieval and modern sources, a number of Byzantine emperors were allegedly Armenian or of partially Armenian heritage. The following list includes the Byzantine emperors to whom sources attribute Armenian origin. Speculation of Armenian ancestry in emperors remains a wide topic of debate.

== History and criticism ==
In 1891 John Buchan Telfer reported to the Royal Society of Arts several Byzantine emperors of Armenian origin, including Maurice and John Tzimiskes.

The first work on Byzantine emperors of Armenian origin, Armenian Emperors of Byzantium (Armenian: Հայ կայսերք Բիւզանդիոնի), was authored by Fr. Garabed Der-Sahagian and published in 1905 by the Mekhitarist congregation of San Lazzaro degli Armeni in Venice. Anthony Kaldellis suggested that Der-Sahagian extended "western European modes of racial and nationalist historiography to the history of medieval Armenia." Kaldellis believes that it was Nicholas Adontz who "made the search for Armenians in Byzantium into a more scholarly and less romantic nationalist process." However, he is critical of Adontz as he saw "Armenians everywhere and injected them into as many important events as he could."

According to Kaldellis it was later endorsed by Peter Charanis and Alexander Kazhdan and "has spread widely in the field of Byzantine Studies." Kazhdan's book Armenians in the Ruling Class of the Byzantine Empire in the 11th-12th Centuries was published by the Armenian Academy of Sciences in Russian in 1975.

Charanis suggested that "every emperor who sat on the Byzantine throne from the accession of Basil I to the death of Basil II (867—1025) was of Armenian or partially Armenian origin." However, he noted that "in Byzantium the ethnic origins of a person was of not significance, provided he integrated himself into its cultural life." Speros Vryonis listed the Heracleian and Macedonian dynasties as being of Armenian ancestry, along with individual emperors like Leo V, Romanus I, and John Tzimisces.

Robert H. Hewsen counted "no fewer than sixteen emperors and eleven empresses" of Byzantium of Armenian origin and suggested that Armenians ruled "for almost a third of [the empire's] history." He conceded, however, that "[m]ost of these Armenians, of course, were thoroughly hellenized, membership in the Greek Church being the sine qua non for advancement in the Byzantine world."

Anthony Kaldellis is highly critical of what he calls the "Armenian fallacy" in Byzantine studies to which he dedicated a separate chapter (Armenian fallacy) and a sub-chapter specifically about emperors ('Armenian' emperors) in his 2019 book Romanland: Ethnicity and Empire in Byzantium, published by Harvard University Press. He wrote, "The consensual mass hallucination that is the Armenian fallacy has populated Byzantine history with a series of alleged “Armenian” emperors." Earlier, in 2008, Kaldellis wrote in Two Romes that scholars incorrectly apply modern ethnic labels like "Armenian" or "Bulgarian" to assimilated Byzantine Romans, stating “what they should be called are Romans of Armenian descent” instead. He suggested this practice is driven by modern nationalist claims rather than historical accuracy.

Kaldellis' criticisms of the "Armenian fallacy" have been subsequently endorsed by historians such as Johannes Preiser-Kapeller, Alexander Beihammer, Marek Klatý, and C.J. Meynell, among others. Toby Bromige wrote that Kaldellis "may at times seem dismissive of the depth and influence that Armenians had within Byzantium, especially the strength of ancestral descent in certain individuals, but he correctly identifies a lack of relevant historical investigation and precision."

== List ==
Portrait	Name	Reign	Dynasty	Comments and notes
=== Pre-Macedonian ===
	Maurice	582–602 (20 years)	Justinian	Medieval Armenian chroniclers such as Stepanos Taronetsi and Kirakos Gandzaketsi claim Maurice to be of Armenian origin. A 7th century obelisk in Oshakan, Armenia is attributed by a local tradition to Maurice or his mother. Modern scholarship, however, does not have a consensus. Krzysztof Stopka writes that it is generally regarded as a legend. It has been accepted by Nicholas Adontz, Peter Charanis, (Note: Charanis changed his views on the ethnic origin of Maurice. In his The Armenians in the Byzantine Empire (1961) he wrote that it is "extremely doubtful" that Maurice may have been of Armenian descent. However, in the 1965 article "A Note on the Ethnic Origin of the Emperor Maurice" he wrote that "Maurice must be accepted, therefore, as the first Byzantine emperor [...] to have been of Armenian origin.") Henri Grégoire, Robert H. Hewsen, but rejected by others, such as Paul Goubert. Walter Kaegi described him as "of probable Armenian origin." Anthony Kaldellis argues that his Armenian ancestry is "largely unknown to historians who study his reign" and that "no contemporary source—and there are many— mentions it." He considers the medieval Armenian chronicles to be "Armenian folktales" and notes that "[n]one of the names in his extended family are Armenian". A. E. Redgate is also skeptical; as the "counter-arguments, in his case, seem overwhelming."
	Heraclius	610–641 (31 years)	Heraclian	The son of Heraclius the Elder, who is generally recognized by scholars as an Armenian. (Note: "...Heraclius, himself of Armenian descent...") According to the 7th century Armenian historian Sebeos, Heraclius was related to the Arsacid dynasty of Armenia. Hewsen talked of the Heraclids being "of royal Arsacid origin." Redgate considers his Armenian origin likely. Walter Kaegi notes that Heraclius was presumably "bilingual (Armenian and Greek) from an early age, but even this is uncertain." Kaldellis argues that his Armenian origin "takes the prize for fiction masquerading as history" and that statements regarding his ancestry "have been woven out of thin air". He notes that "there is not a single primary source that says that Herakleios was an Armenian" and, moreover, "none of the names in his extended family are Armenian, and this in an age when Armenian generals in Roman service kept their native names and did not always switch to Graeco-Roman ones". He writes that this assertion about Heraclius' ancestry is based on an erroneous reading of Theophylact Simocatta. In a letter, Priscus, a general who had replaced Heraclius the Elder, wrote to him "to leave the army and return to his own city in Armenia". Kaldellis interprets it as the command headquarters of Heraclius the Elder, and not his home town, since "[i]t would make no sense in the context of the narrative for Philippikos to send Herakleios “home.”". According to historian Benjamin Anderson, Kaldellis "effectively debunks the received wisdom" on Heraclius's origins.
	Mizizios	668–669 (1 year)	— (usurper)	Considered Armenian by mainstream scholarship. He came from the Gnuni family.
	Philippicus; Bardanes	711–713 (2 years)	— (Twenty Years' Anarchy)	Considered Armenian by mainstream scholarship. (Note: "The Armenian Bardanes occupied the throne from 711 to 713.") Kaldellis disputes this view, pointing to his anti-Armenian policies such as his decision to expel all Armenians from the empire, forcing them to seek refuge among the Arabs, (though this wasn't fully enforced) and his later decree ordering all Armenians to accept the authority of the Patriarch of Constantinople. According to Kaldellis, this "shows that despite his ancestry he was not, and did not consider himself to be, 'an Armenian,' as some modern historians call him" and speculated that he may have been Persian.
	Artabasdos	741–743 (2 years)	— (usurper)	Considered Armenian by mainstream scholarship. Nina Garsoïan suggests that he hailed from the Mamikonian house. Kaldellis believes that we "do not know enough about the first [i.e. Artabasdos] to have an interesting discussion of his ethnicity."
	Leo V	813–820 (7 years)	non-dynastic	Scholars agree that he was at least partly of Armenian origin. (Note: "Leo V, known as the Armenian, occupied the throne from 813 to 820. He is referred to in one of the sources as digenes, 'twyborn', i. e., born of two races, and these two races are given as Assyrian and Armenian (56). The thorough and careful investigation of all the sources, however, has shown that there is no truth in the tradition (57). Leo was an Armenian...") According to Jenkins, was certainly of Armenian stock on one side. He is said to have been 'Assyrian', that is, Syrian, on the other: but this is perhaps attached to him owing to his heretical and iconoclastic beliefs, and to the fact that he modelled himself on the great iconoclast conqueror Leo III, to whom Syrian descent was more certainly attributed. He is the only emperor to be nicknamed "Armenian" by Byzantine historians. Armenian chronicles claimed he was an Artsruni. Kaldellis notes that his "ancestry is said to have been Armenian, Assyrian, and Amalekite (a biblical ethnonym), whatever exactly those terms may have meant in a late eighth-century context." He also writes that "we have no evidence for how Leon V acknowledged, tried to hide or counter, or ameliorated his “ethnic” background as emperor".
	Constantine	813–820 (7 years)	co-emperor non-dynastic	The son of Leo V the Armenian.
	Michael III	842–867 (25 years)	Amorian	His mother, Theodora, the wife of Theophilos, is considered by some scholars to have been, at least partly, of Armenian origin. (Note: "Theodora, the wife of Theophilus, son and successor of Michael II, was a native of Ebissa in Paphlagonia, but she was of Armenian descent at least from her father's side. Thus Michael III who succeeded his father Theophilus was partly Armenian.) Kaldellis argues that "As the restorer of icons in 843, many texts discuss her, yet none refers to her Armenian ethnicity."
	Theodora	842–856 (14 years)	Amorian	Empress regnant during the minority of Michael III. Considered by some scholars to have been, at least partly, of Armenian origin. (Note: "Theodora, the wife of Theophilus, son and successor of Michael II, was a native of Ebissa in Paphlagonia, but she was of Armenian descent at least from her father's side. Thus Michael III who succeeded his father Theophilus was partly Armenian.) Kaldellis wrote that no source (Byzantine or Medieval Armenian) refers to her as an Armenian, or as being of Armenian descent.
=== Macedonian dynasty === The Macedonian dynasty, which ruled the empire between 867 and 1056, has been called the "Armenian dynasty" by some scholars such as George Bournoutian and Mack Chahin. Zachary Chitwood suggests the term Macedonian dynasty is "something of a misnomer" because of the Armenian origin of Basil I, the dynasty's founder.
Portrait	Name	Reign	Dynasty	Comments and notes
	Basil I	867–886 (19 years)	Macedonian	His father is considered by many to be of Armenian origin. The Armenian descent of his mother is debated. (Note: "That Basil I, the founder of the most brilliant dynasty of the Byzantine empire, was indeed Armenian and Armenian on both sides, can be regarded as an established fact.") Her name, which is Greek, points to a Greek origin for her. Medieval Armenian historians Samuel Anetsi and Stepanos Taronetsi claimed that he hailed from the region of Taron. He is also "presumed to have descended from the kingly house of the Arsacids." Kaldellis calls the Arsacid connection "propaganda", aimed to confer legitimacy upon Basil's alleged "royal" and "biblical" origins (Note: Excluding the Arsacids, Basil claimed links to figures such as Alexander the Great, Constantine the Great, Cyrus the Great, David, Solomon, as well as to prophets of the Old Testament.) and additionally meant to give "diplomatic leverage in his dealings with the empire’s Armenian neighbors". He wrote: "The Romans generally called Basileios a Macedonian, from his provincial origin, rather than an Armenian, and some Arabic texts call him a Slav. (Note: Nevertheless, the Arabic term Ṣaqlabī, used to define Basil, and adopted by some modern scholars to describe him as partly Slavic, also described the inhabitants between Constantinople and the First Bulgarian Empire.) Warren Treadgold wrote that his Arsacid origin is an "obvious forgery", but he "may have had Armenian blood."
	Romanos I Lekapenos	920–944 (24 years)	Macedonian/ Lekapenos	According to some scholars. Charanis wrote that Romanos Lekapenos was "definitely known to have been of Armenian origin." According to Mark Whittow Romanos "seem[s] to have been Armenian." According to Kaldellis, Romanos is discussed in many Byzantine sources, "but none of them calls him an Armenian," but because his father came from humble origin he was assumed to have been Armenian. "His alleged ethnicity has been repeated so often in the literature that it has acquired the status of a known fact, even though it is based on the most tenuous of indirect connections," wrote Kaldellis.
	Nikephoros II; Phokas	963–969 (9 years)	Macedonian	According to some scholars he was of at least partial Armenian descent. (Note: "The Phocades then, if not entirely Armenian in origin were at least partially so. That means, of course, that Nicephorus Phocas, one of the three emperors of the tenth century who were not legitimate members of the Macedonian dynasty, but were associated with it, was also at least partially Armenian in origin.") Kaldellis notes that recent scholarship has correctly removed his family's name from the list of Byzantine families of "Armenian" origin, writing that it had been placed there originally for "flimsy (i.e., nonexistent) reasons".
	John I Tzimiskes	969–976 (8 years)	Macedonian	Considered Armenian by mainstream scholarship. (Note: "Thus, Tzimiskes, one of the truly great soldier-emperors of Byzantium, belonged by birth to a distinguished Armenian family which had established itself among the military aristocracy of Byzantium.") According to the medieval Armenian chronicler Matthew of Edessa Tzimiskes was from the region of Khozan, from the area which is now called Chmushkatzag." Kaldellis is skeptical, calling the grounds for his Armenian origin "extremely weak", noting that "Tzimiskes" was a nickname given to him by Armenian soldiers serving under him, referring to his short statute, and not a family name. Evaluating the evidence, he concludes that "No ethnicity or even distant ancestry can be proposed based on such evidence".
=== Post-Macedonian ===
	Andronikos III; Palaiologos	1328–1341 (13 years)	Palaiologos	His mother, Rita-Maria, was the daughter of Leo II, King of Armenian Cilicia, and sister of Hethum II.

== See also ==
- Armenians in the Byzantine Empire

== Bibliography ==
- Charanis, Peter (1963). The Armenians in the Byzantine Empire. Lisbon: Fundação Calouste Gulbenkian Armenian Library. OCLC 17186882.
- Lilie, Ralph-Johannes; Ludwig, Claudia; Pratsch, Thomas; Zielke, Beate (2013). Prosopographie der mittelbyzantinischen Zeit Online. Berlin-Brandenburgische Akademie der Wissenschaften. Nach Vorarbeiten F. Winkelmanns erstellt (in German). Berlin and Boston: De Gruyter.
- Treadgold, Warren (1997). A History of the Byzantine State and Society. Stanford, California: Stanford University Press. ISBN 0-8047-2630-2.
- Der Nersessian, Sirarpie (1966). "Les portraits de Grégoire l'Illuminateur dans l'art byzantin [Portraits of Gregory the Illuminator in Byzantine Art]". Byzantion (in French). 36 (2): 386–395. JSTOR 44169213.
- Kaldellis, Anthony (2019). Romanland: Ethnicity and Empire in Byzantium. Harvard University Press. ISBN 9780674986510.
- Mango, Cyril; Hawkins, Ernest J. W. (1972). "The Mosaics of St. Sophia at Istanbul. The Church Fathers in the North Tympanum". Dumbarton Oaks Papers. 26: 1–41. doi:10.2307/1291315. JSTOR 1291315.
