= Hauteville family =

Norman noble family that rose to prominence in southern Italy

Hauteville Altavilla, Autavilla
- Noble house
- Coat of arms of the Hauteville family
- Country: Normandy, Southern Italy
- Founded: 11th century
- Founder: Tancred of Hauteville
- Final ruler: Constance of Sicily (died 1198)
- Titles: List: Count of Apulia (1042–1059); Duke of Apulia (1059–1130); King of Sicily (1130–1198); Prince of Antioch (1098–1163)
- Motto: Dextera Domini fecit virtutem, Dextera Domini exaltavit me (God's right-hand made wonders, God's right-hand exalted me)
- Cadet branches: List: Guarna / Avarna family; Gesualdo family; Rosso family; Mazzarino family; Loffredo; Ventimiglia of Geraci

The Hauteville family (Italian: Altavilla, Sicilian: Autaviḍḍa) was a Norman family, originally of petty lords, from the Cotentin Peninsula in Normandy. The Hautevilles rose to prominence through their part in the Norman conquest of southern Italy. In 1130, Roger II of Hauteville, was made the first King of Sicily. His male-line descendants ruled the kingdom until 1194. The Hauteville also took part in the First Crusade and ruled the independent Principality of Antioch (1098).

== Origins ==
Tradition traces the family's origins to Hiallt, a 10th-century Viking who supposedly founded the village of Hialtus villa (Højby in Danish), from which the family's name originates. Hiallt, however, is probably just a legendary eponymous ancestor: the Latin form of Hauteville, Altavilla, simply means "high estate".

The first well-documented member of the family is Tancred of Hauteville, petty lord of Hauteville-la-Guichard. Tancred had many sons by his two wives, Muriella and Fressenda, and his small patrimony was hardly enough to accommodate all of his children. They were thus forced to seek fortune elsewhere, namely in Southern Italy.

== Southern Italy ==
William Iron Arm and Drogo were the first of Tancred's sons to arrive in Southern Italy, sometime around 1035. They distinguished themselves in a rebellion against the Byzantines, and in 1042 William Iron Arm was named the first Count of Apulia. In 1046 he was succeeded by Drogo, whose titles were confirmed by Emperor Henry III. Drogo was succeeded by another brother, Humphrey, who in 1053 defeated Pope Leo IX in the Battle of Civitate, strengthening the Hautevilles’ power.

Humphrey was succeeded by a fourth brother, Robert Guiscard. In 1059, Robert was made the first Duke of Apulia and Calabria, and also Lord of Sicily, by Pope Nicholas II. Together with his younger brother, Roger I, he started to conquer Sicily, at the time occupied by the Saracens. Guiscard was succeeded by his son Roger Borsa, who in turn was succeeded by his son William II. When William died childless, all of the Hauteville family's domains were inherited by Roger II, son of Roger I.

=== Kingdom of Sicily ===
After unifying all of the Hauteville family's domains, Roger II supported Antipope Anacletus II, and on Christmas of 1130, Roger was made King of Sicily. Roger spent the majority of his first decade of reign fending off invaders and suppressing rebellions. In 1139, with the Treaty of Mignano, his kingship was recognized by the legitimate Pope, Innocent II. Through the actions of his admiral George of Antioch, Roger also proceeded to conquer the Mahdia, taking the unofficial title of “King of Africa”.

Roger's son and successor was William I the Bad. His nickname derives primarily from his lack of popularity among the chroniclers, who supported the baronial revolts that William crushed. In 1166 he was succeeded by his son William II the Good, who was still a minor. During his regency, that lasted until 1171, the realm was subject to turmoils, which almost broke it apart. Eventually peace won, and William II's reign is remembered as peaceful and prosperous.

William II died without heirs in 1189, and there was a succession dispute. William's only legitimate heir was his aunt Constance, but she had married Emperor Henry VI, and Sicilian officials didn't want a German ruler. An illegitimate cousin of William, Tancred of Lecce, seized the throne. He initially had to fight against a revolt of Roger of Andria, a former contender. In 1190 he managed to kill him, and in 1191 he was able to repel an invasion of Constance and Henry VI. After he died in 1194, however, the kingdom passed to Constance anyway, and was afterwards ruled by the Hohenstaufen. Constance and Henry's son and successor was Emperor Frederick II.

== Crusades ==
The eldest son of Robert Guiscard, Bohemond, didn't inherit the majority of his father possessions because he wasn't considered legitimate, as his parents’ marriage was annulled for consanguinity. He thus had to find land elsewhere. In 1097 he joined a band of Crusaders, on their way to the first Crusade, along with his nephew, Tancred of Galilee. Bohemond took the city of Antioch, and remained there for the duration of the Crusade, carving out the independent Principality of Antioch for himself. He was succeeded by his son Bohemond II, who in turn was succeeded by his daughter Constance, who ruled the principality until 1163. Bohemond's nephew, Tancred, also had luck in carving the Principality of Galilee, a vassal fief of the Kingdom of Jerusalem.

== Cadet branches ==
Different Italian noble families are scions of the House of Hauteville. Among these, there are the Gesualdo family, the Rosso family, and the Guarna / Avarna family.

Supposed members of the House of Hauteville also appear in England. According to Goffredo Malaterra, one of Tancred's sons, Aubrey or Alverard, remained in Normandy. The Domesday Book, written in 1086, records that a certain Aluericus Halsvilla had previously held lands in Compton Martin, in the County of Somerset. His kinsman, Ralf Halsvilla is mentioned as a tenant in Burbage and Wolfhall, in Wiltshire.

== Genealogy ==
Genealogy of the Hautevilles and the Kings of Sicily

Kings of Sicily Family Tree

Tancred of Hauteville
William Iron Arm (d. 1046); 1st count of Apulia (1042–1046)	Drogo, 2nd count of Apulia (1046–1051)	Humphrey; 3rd count of Apulia (1051–1057)	Robert Guiscard; 4th count (1057–1059) and 1st duke of Apulia(1059–1085)	Roger I Bosso or the Grand Count Roger; 1031–1101; C. of Sicily r. 1071–1101	Hauteville dynasty
Bohemond I c. 1054 – 1111 mother repudiated Prince of Taranto, 1088; Prince of Antioch,1098 m. Constance d. of Philip I of France	Roger Borsa c. 1061 – 1111; 2nd duke of Apulia, 1085	Simon; 1093–1105 r. 1101–1105	Roger II the Great; 1095–1154; C. of Sicily r. 1105–1154 & D. of Apulia, 1127; 1st. K. of Sicily, 1130
Bohemond II; 1107/1108 – 1130; Prince of Taranto r.1111-1128 Prince of Antioch r. 1111/1119-1130	Roger III Borsa; 1118–1148 heir, D. of Apulia	William I the Bad; 1131–1166; 2nd K. of Sicily r. 1154–1166	Constance I 1154–1198; 7th Q. of Sicily, r. 1194–1198	Henry I 1165–1197; 8th K. of Sicily (Jure uxoris), r. 1194–1197; Holy Roman Emperor, 1191	House of Hohenstaufen
Constance of Antioch c. 1128–1163 ruling Princess of Antioch r. 1130-1160 m. Raymond of Poitiers, 2m. Raynald of Châtillon	Tancred I (illeg.); 1138–1194; C. of Lecce, 1168; 4th K. of Sicily r. 1189–1194	William II the Good; 1155–1189; 3rd K. of Sicily r. 1166–1189	Frederick II Roger; 1194–1250; 9th K. of Sicily r. 1198–1250; Holy Roman Emperor, 1212
Bohemond III the Child or the Stammerer of Poiters c. 1148–1201; Prince of Antioch r. 1163–1201	Roger III (co-king); 1175–1193; 5th K. of Sicily, r. 1193	William III; 1186–1198; 6th K. of Sicily, r. 1194	Henry II; 1211–1242; 10th/co - K. of Sicilyr. 1212–1217	Conrad I 1228–1254; 11th K. of Sicily r. 1250–1254	Manfred; 1232–1266; 13th K. of Sicily r. 1258–1266
Charles I 1226–1285; 14th K. of Sicily, but really Naples r. 1266–1282	Conrad II (Conradin); 1252–1268; 12th K. of Sicily r. 1254–1258	Capetian House of Anjou
Charles II (Mainland territories); 1254–1309	Peter I 1239–1285 r. 1282–1285	Constance II; 1249–1302; 15th 12th Q. of Sicily r. 1282–1285 (pretender from 1268)	Aragon
Eleanor; 1289–1341	Frederick II; 1272–1337 r. 1296–1337	James (II of Aragon); 1267–1327 r. 1285–1295
Peter II; 1305–1342 r. 1337–1342	Alfonso; 1299–1336
Frederick III; 1341–1377 r. 1355–1377	Louis I 1337–1355 r. 1342–1355	Eleanor; 1325–1375	Peter; 1319–1387
Martin II; 1356–1410 r. 1409–1410	Eleanor; 1358–1382
Maria I 1363–1401 r. 1377–1401	Martin I 1374–1409 r. 1395–1409	Ferdinand I 1380–1416 r. 1412–1416	House of Trastámara
John I 1398–1479 r. 1458–1479	Alfonso I 1396–1458 r. 1416–1458
Ferdinand II; 1452–1516 r. 1479–1516
Joanna I 1479–1555 r. 1516–1555
House of Habsburg	Charles II; 1500–1558 r. 1516–1554	Ferdinand; 1503–1564
Philip I 1527–1598 r. 1554–1598	Charles; 1540–1590
Catherine Michelle; 1567–1597	Philip II; 1578–1621 r. 1598–1621	Ferdinand; 1578–1637
House of Savoy	Victor Amadeus; 1587–1637	Philip III; 1605–1665 r. 1621–1665	Maria Anna; 1606–1646	Ferdinand; 1608–1657
Charles Emmanuel; 1634–1675	Maria Theresa; 1638–1683	Charles III; 1661–1700 r. 1665–1700	Leopold; 1640–1705
Victor Amadeus; 1666–1732 r. 1713–1720	Louis; 1661–1711	Charles IV; 1685–1740 r.1720–1735
House of Bourbon-Anjou	Philip IV; 1683–1746 r. 1700–1713
Charles V 1716–1788 r. 1735–1759
Ferdinand III; 1751–1825 r. 1759–1816

Here follows the family tree of the main branch of the Hauteville family:

Tancred of Hauteville - Seigneur of Hauteville-la-Guichard 1.⚭ Muriella, 2.⚭ Fressenda
(1) Serlo - Seigneur of Hauteville-la-Guichard
Serlo
(1) Geoffrey - Count of the Capitanate
Robert I - Count of Loritello
offspring? (Note: Robert possibly had offsprings who were also counts of Loritello, but the sources for their parentage remain obscure)
Drogo "Tassio"
Robert
William
Ralph - Count of Catanzaro
Geoffrey - Count of Catanzaro
Raymond - Count of Catanzaro
Clementia ⚭ a certain Hugh → (issue)
William
Ugone Rosso (“Hugh the Red”)
Rosso (family)
Tancred
(1) William Iron Arm - Count of Apulia ⚭ Guida of Sorrento
(1) Drogo - Count of Apulia 1.⚭ Altrude, 2.⚭ Gaitelgrima of Salerno
(1) Richard ⚭ Alberada (former wife of Robert Guiscard)
(1) Rocca ⚭ a certain Hubert → (issue)
(1) Eremburga
(1) Humphrey - Count of Apulia ⚭ Gaitelgrima of Sorrento
Geoffrey (Note: The Gesta Roberti Wiscardi names, in order. "Gosfridus, Gocelinus, Abagelardus" as sons of "Unfredi")
Joscelin (Note: The Gesta Roberti Wiscardi names, in order. "Gosfridus, Gocelinus, Abagelardus" as sons of "Unfredi")
Abelard
Herman
a daughter ⚭ a certain Gradilon (Note: Amatus of Montecassino records that Robert Guiscard pursued "Abelard and Gradilon, the husband of his sister" after the former's rebellion in 1078)
(2) Robert Guiscard - Duke of Apulia 1.⚭ Alberada, 2.⚭ Sikelgaita
(1) Bohemond I - Prince of Antioch ⚭ Constance of France
Bohemond II - Prince of Antioch ⚭ Alice of Jerusalem
Constance - Princess of Antioch ⚭ Raymond of Poitiers → (issue)
John (Note: died young)
(1) Emma (Note: In some instances, Emma is given as Robert's sister rather than his daughter. Guibert of Nogent, however, calls her son, Tancred of Galilee, the nephew of Bohemond I of Antioch, thus making her a daughter of Robert Guiscard. From a chronological perspective, it is also more probable that Emma was Guiscard's daughter.) ⚭ Odo the Good Marquis → (issue)
(2) Matilda ⚭ Ramon Berenguer II → (issue)
(2) Roger Borsa - Duke of Apulia ⚭ Adela of Flanders
Louis (Note: died young)
Guiscard (Note: died young)
William II - Duke of Apulia ⚭ Gaitelgrima of Alife
(ill.) William - Count of Gesualdo and Lucera ⚭ Alberada
Gesualdo family
(2) Mabel (or Mabilia) ⚭ William de Grandmesnil
(2) a Daughter (Note: Sometimes given the name Héria) ⚭ Hugh V of Maine
(2) Robert Scalio
(2) Guy
(2) Sybilla ⚭ Ebles II of Roucy
(2) Olympias (Helena) ⚭(betrothed) Constantine Doukas
(2) Cecile
(2) Gaitelgrima ⚭ Humphrey, Count of Sarno
(2) Mauger - Count of the Capitanate
(2) Fressenda ⚭ Richard I of Capua → (issue)
(2) William I - Count of the Principate ⚭ Maria of Sorrento
Robert - Count of the Principate ⚭ Gilia
William II - Count of the Principate
Nicholas - Count of the Principate
William III - Count of the Principate
Richard - participant of the First Crusade ⚭ Altrude (daughter of Emma and Odo)
Roger - Regent of Antioch
Maria (Note: the primary source for her name is not known) ⚭ Joscelin I of Edessa
Ranulf (also Rainald)
Tancred - Count of Syracuse
a daughter ⚭(betrothed) to Domenico, son of Domenico Selvo (doge)
William
(2) Aubrey (also Alvered)
(2) Hubert (also Humbert)
(2) Tancred
(2) Frumentin (Note: The name Frumentinus bears resemblance to the name Hubertus. Frumentin and Hubert may thus be the same person)
(2) Roger I - Count of Sicily 1.⚭ Judith, 2.⚭ Eremburga, 3.⚭Adelaide
(1) a daughter ⚭ Hugh of Gercé, Count of Catania
(1) Matilda ⚭ Raymond IV of Toulouse
(1) Emma (Note: John Julius Norwich identifies the Emma who married William of Auvergne and the Emma who married Rudolf of Montescaglioso as two different daughters of Roger I who bore the same name.) 1.⚭ William VI of Auvergne → (issue), 2.⚭ Rudolf of Montescaglioso
(1) Adela ⚭ Henry of Monte Sant’Angelo
(ill.) Jordan
(2) Felicia (Note: (this daughter of Roger I is called Felicia in the Europäische Stammtafeln, but other sources do not give her name. She is also sometimes mistakenly called Busilla, but this is thought to be a misinterpretation of the French word pucelle, meaning young lady or virgin.)) ⚭ Coloman, King of Hungary → (issue)
(2) Geoffrey the Leper
(2) Mauger - Count of Troina
(2) Constance ⚭ Conrad II of Italy
(2) Matilda ⚭ Rainulf II of Alife → (issue)
(2) Flandina ⚭ Henry del Vasto
(2) a daughter (Note: Patrick van Kerrebrouck says that her name could be Sibylla and that she was born from Roger’s third marriage. However, chronologically, it is more probable that she was born from Roger’s second marriage) ⚭ Robert (son of Robert I of Burgundy)
(2) Judith ⚭ Robert I of Conversano → (issue)
(3) Simon - Count of Sicily
(3) ROGER II - King of Sicily 1.⚭ Elvira, 2.⚭ Sibylla, 3.⚭ Beatrice
(1) Roger III - Duke of Apulia ⚭ Elizabeth of Blois
(ill.) TANCRED - King of Sicily ⚭ Sibylla
ROGER III - Co-king of Sicily ⚭ Irene Angelina
WILLIAM III - King of Sicily
a daughter ⚭(betrothed) Arthur I of Brittany
Madania (or Sybilla) ⚭ Robert, Count of Montescaglioso
Elvira 1.⚭ Walter III of Brienne, 2.⚭ James Sanseverino, Count of Tricarico
Constance ⚭ Pietro Ziani, Doge of Venice
Valdrada (Note: Valdrada is only named in one source, “The dogaressas of Venice” by Edgcumbe Staley) ⚭ Jacopo Tiepolo, Doge of Venice
(ill.) William
(1) Tancred - Prince of Bari
(1) Alfonso - Prince of Capua
(1) a daughter
(1) WILLIAM I THE BAD - King of Sicily ⚭ Margaret of Navarre
Roger IV - Duke of Apulia
Robert III - Prince of Capua
WILLIAM II THE GOOD - King of Sicily ⚭ Joan of England
Bohemond (Note: predeceased his father) - Duke of Apulia
Henry - Prince of Capua
(ill.) two illegitimate daughters? (Note: The claim for these two daughters existing is made in Snorri Sturluson's Heimskringla, which records: "William king of Sicily…had three daughters…his second daughter married the Duke of Kipr [ Isaac Komnenos of Cyprus ]...his third daughter, Margaret, was married to the chief of the corsairs [a certain Margaritone, admiral of Sicily]". However, the Heimskringla also records that William had no sons, and that a daughter of his married an "emperor Henry who killed his brothers in law". Therefore, it can't be trusted.)
(1) Henry
(2) Henry (Note: died an infant)
(2) stillborn child
(3) CONSTANCE - Queen of Sicily ⚭ Henry VI, Holy Roman Emperor → (issue)
(ill.) Simon - Prince of Taranto
(ill.) a daughter ⚭ a certain Adam
(ill.) a daughter ⚭ Henry (Rodrigo) of Montescaglioso
(ill.) a daughter ⚭ Hugh II, Count of Molise
(ill.) Adela 1.⚭ Joscelin, Count of Loreto, 2.⚭ Robert III of Loritello
(3) Maximilla (Note: this daughter is only named in one source)
(ill.) Geoffrey - Count of Ragusa ⚭ Rogalia
Bartholomew
Silvester I - Count of Marsico
William - Count of Marsico ⚭ Stephanie
Matilda (Note: lived three months)
Geoffrey
Silvester II - Count of Marsico
Desiderata (Note: Rocco Pirri records her as this Geoffrey's daughter. Carlo Alberto Garufi, on the other hand, records her as daughter of a certain Geoffrey of Lecce, Count of Montescaglioso.) ⚭ Bartholomew of Lucy, Count of Paternò → (issue)
Geoffrey
Roger
Airolda (Note: this daughter is only named in one source)
Guarna / Avarna family
two other daughters (Note: The Annales of Romuald Guarna state that Tancred had three daughters, but without naming them or stating by which marriage they were born. One of these daughters is the Fressenda named above. One of the two remaining daughters is sometimes given the name Beatrice, and has been erroneously identified as the mother of Geoffrey, Count of Conversano. All of the informations regarding her are dubious)

== Sources ==
- European Commission presentation of The Normans Norman Heritage, 10th-12th century.
- Norwich, John Julius. The Normans in the South 1016-1130. Longmans: London, 1967.
- Norwich, John Julius. The Kingdom in the Sun 1130-1194. Longman: London, 1970.
- Pierre Aubé, Roger II de Sicile. 2001.
- Matthew, Donald. The Norman Kingdom of Sicily. Cambridge University Press: 1992.
- Houben, Hubert. Roger II of Sicily: A Ruler between East and West. Trans. G. A. Loud and Diane Milbourne. Cambridge University Press: 2002.
- Medieval Sourcebook: Alexiad—complete text, translated Elizabeth A. Dawes
- Ralph of Caen. Gesta Tancredi. trans. Bernard S. and David S. Bachrach. Ashgate Publishing, 2005.
