= Gaitelgrima =

Gaitelgrima is a Lombard feminine name.

There are several notable Gaitelgrimas in history. The identities of these six women (as well as some others of the same name) are often confused because they were all closely related to each other and to two men: Guaimar III of Salerno and his son, Guaimar IV.

- The first was Gaitelgrima of Capua, daughter of Atenulf I of Capua, married Guaimar II of Salerno and was the mother of Gisulf I of Salerno.
- The second, also Gaitelgrima of Capua or Gaitelgrima of Benevento, was the daughter of Pandulf II of Benevento and sister of Pandulf IV of Capua. She was the second wife of Guaimar III and mother of Guaimar IV (his successor), Guy (later duke of Sorrento), and Pandulf (later lord of Capaccio). She was also the mother of the fourth Gaitelgrima.
- This third was Gaitelgrima of Salerno, sister of Guimar IV, who married Drogo of Hauteville in 1047.
- The fourth was Gaitelgrima of Salerno the daughter of Guaimar III who married Humphrey of Hauteville who was the count of Apulia following his brother Drogo's death. She was mother to Abelard and Herman.
- The fifth, also named after Gaitelgrima of Benevento, was also a Gaitelgrima of Salerno. She was the daughter of Guaimar IV of Salerno (see above) and Gemma. She was married to Richard I of Capua by her brother Gisulf II of Salerno and then forced to marry Jordan I of Capua. Her sister, Sichelgaita, was married to Robert Guiscard.
- The last was Gaitelgrima, Duchess of Apulia, the second wife of William II, Duke of Apulia. She was the daughter of Jordan II of Capua. She deeply loved her husband and cut off her hair to cover his coffin at his funeral.
