= Abbey of Santissima Trinità, Venosa =

Abbey of the Most Holy Trinity
- Abbazia della Santissima Trinità
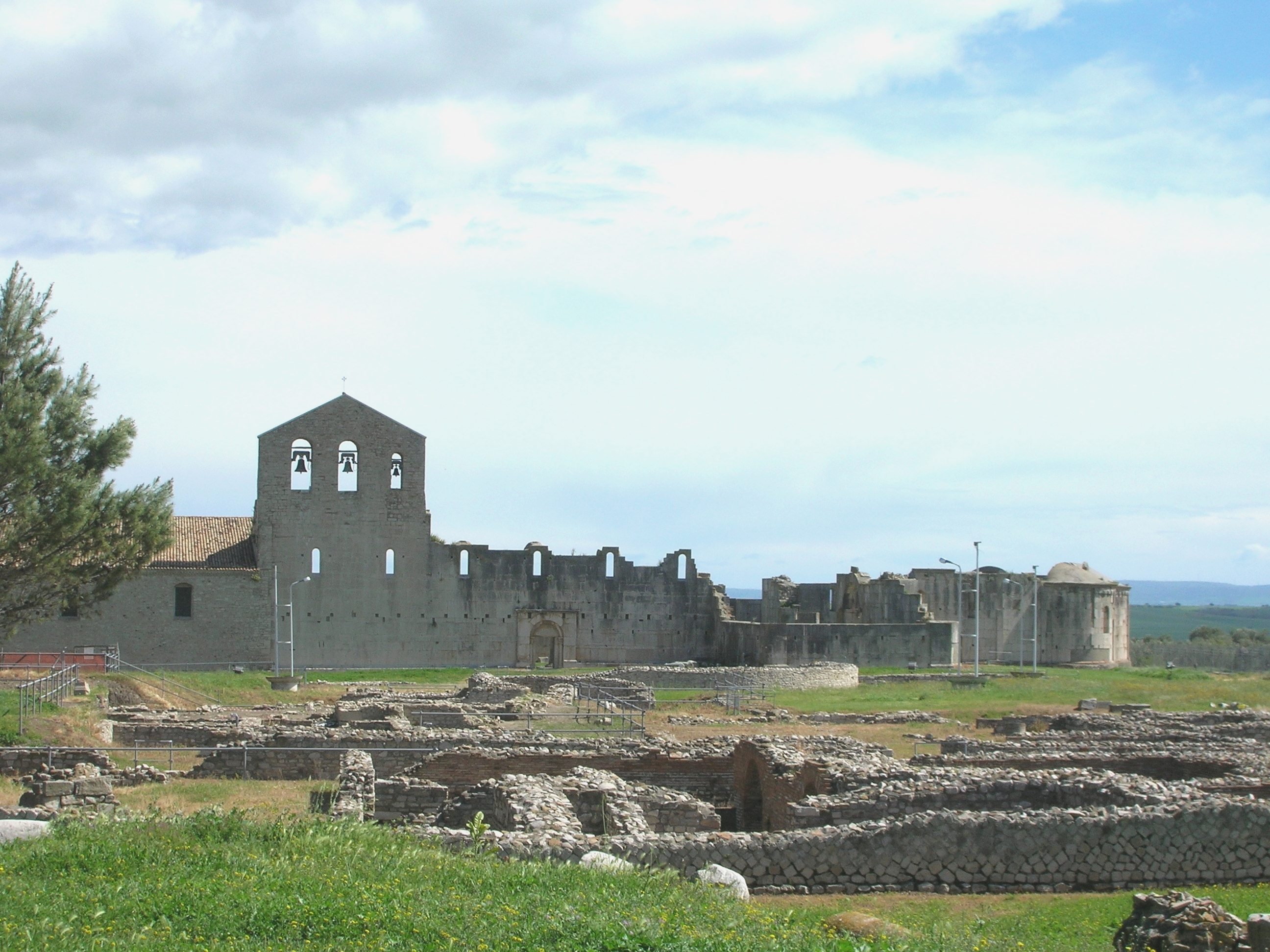
- The Parco Archeologico of Venosa, with the walls of the Incompiuta (centre, right) and part of the old church (left, with pink roof); in the foreground, the remains of Roman Venusia

- Location within Basilicata

Religion
- Affiliation: Roman Catholic
- Region: Basilicata

Location
- Municipality: Venosa
- Interactive map of Abbey of the Most Holy Trinity
- Coordinates: 40.9695°N 15.8276°E

Architecture
- Style: Roman; early Christian; Romanesque; Lombard; Norman
- Groundbreaking: Fifth century
- Completed: not completed

Website
- Comune of Venosa

The Abbey of Santissima Trinità or Abbey of the Most Holy Trinity, Italian: Abbazia della Santissima Trinità, is a Roman Catholic abbey complex at Venosa, in the Vulture area of the province of Potenza, in the southern Italian region of Basilicata. The architecture of the abbey shows Roman, Lombard, and Norman influences. The complex lies within the Parco Archeologico ("archaeological park") of Venosa, approximately 1.5 km north-east of the town; it falls under the Roman Catholic Diocese of Melfi-Rapolla-Venosa. It consists of the old church, of uncertain date; the monastery buildings; and the Incompiuta, the unfinished or new church, begun in the last quarter of the eleventh century and never completed. The complex was declared a National Monument by Royal Decree on 20 November 1897. It is no longer a monastery, but is used by the Trinitarian Order.

== History ==
The date of construction of the monastery is unknown; some elements may date from the eighth century. A foundation date of 954 AD is documented in the spurious Chronicon Cavense of the forger, scholar and priest Francesco Maria Pratilli (1689–1763). Following the Council of Melfi in 1059, the church was transformed from a cathedral to an abbey by a bull of Pope Nicholas II, and the number of monks increased from 20 to 100. In the same year he invested Robert Guiscard as Duke of Puglia and Calabria, and Guiscard made the abbey the religious centre of his domain.

The old church stands on the site of an Imperial Roman building, probably a domus, which shows traces both of earlier Republican occupation and of later Late Classical modification. Some walls of the church are built directly on the mosaic floors of the earlier structure.

To the south of the church and oriented at right-angles to it are the remains of an early Christian basilica, probably built in the late fifth or early sixth century, with a hexagonal font in a trefoil apse.

== Old church ==
The Romanesque entrance to the church is flanked by a pair of stone lions. The church is laid out on a typical early Christian basilica plan, with a narthex and atrium, a wide central nave and lateral aisles, transept and semi-circular apse with ambulatory. Alterations were made by the Lombards in the 10th century, and by the Normans between the 11th and 13th centuries. Two Corinthian columns stand in the nave.

In the right aisle is the Hauteville Tomb (Italian: La tomba degli Altavilla), in which five members of the Norman Hauteville family are buried: Guglielmo Braccio di Ferro ("William Iron Arm", 1010–1046), his brothers Drogo (c. 1010 – 1051) and Umfredo (Humphrey, c. 1010 – 1057), and their half-brothers Robert Guiscard (c. 1015 – 1085) and Guglielmo (William, c. 1027 – 1080). Their bones, previously buried separately, were gathered into a single monument in the mid-16th century by Agostino Gorizio Barba da Novara, bailiff of the Knights Hospitaller of St. John of Jerusalem.

In the left aisle is the tomb of Aberada or Alberada of Buonalbergo, who married Robert Guiscard in 1053 but was repudiated by him for the Lombard princess Sichelgaita of Salerno. Aberada's son by Guiscard, Bohemond I of Antioch, hero of the First Crusade, died in Bari in 1111 and buried in Canosa di Puglia. The inscription on her tomb reads:

GVISCARDI CONIVX ABERADA HAC CONDITVR ARCA
SI GENITVM QVÆRES HVNC CANVSINVS HABET

or roughly: "Aberada wife of Guiscard lies in this sepulchre; if you seek her son, Canosa has him".

Construction of L'Incompiuta began in the last quarter of the 11th century. Use was made of materials from monuments of various civilizations, including the Roman, Lombard and Jewish. The layout is unusual for Italy, and French in conception; it shows similarities to that of the cathedrals of Aversa and Acerenza.

In 1297, by order of Pope Boniface VIII, the abbey passed from the Benedictines into the hands of the Knights Hospitaller of the Order of St. John of Jerusalem, at that time based in the Kingdom of Cyprus.

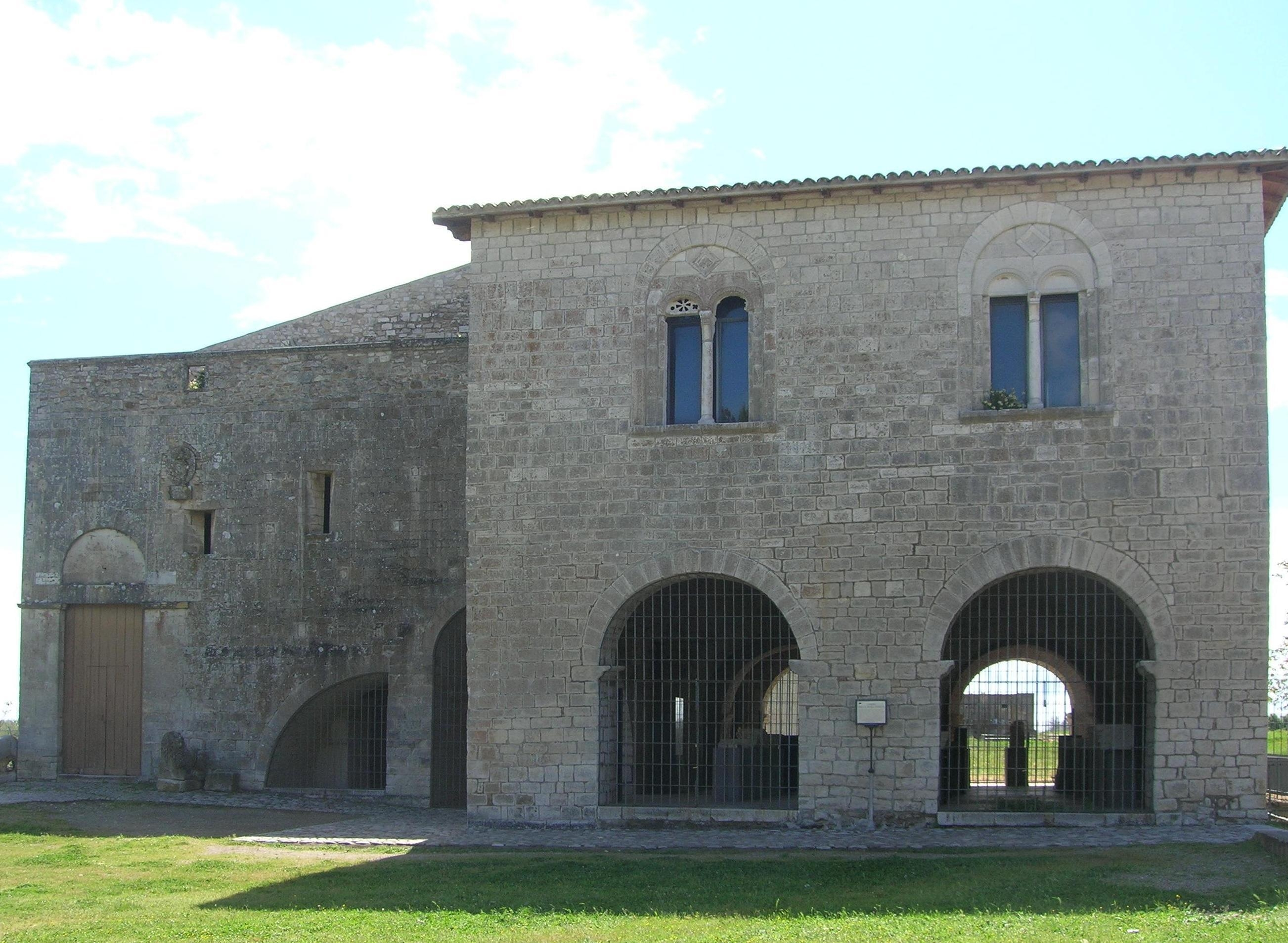
The entrance to the old church, far left

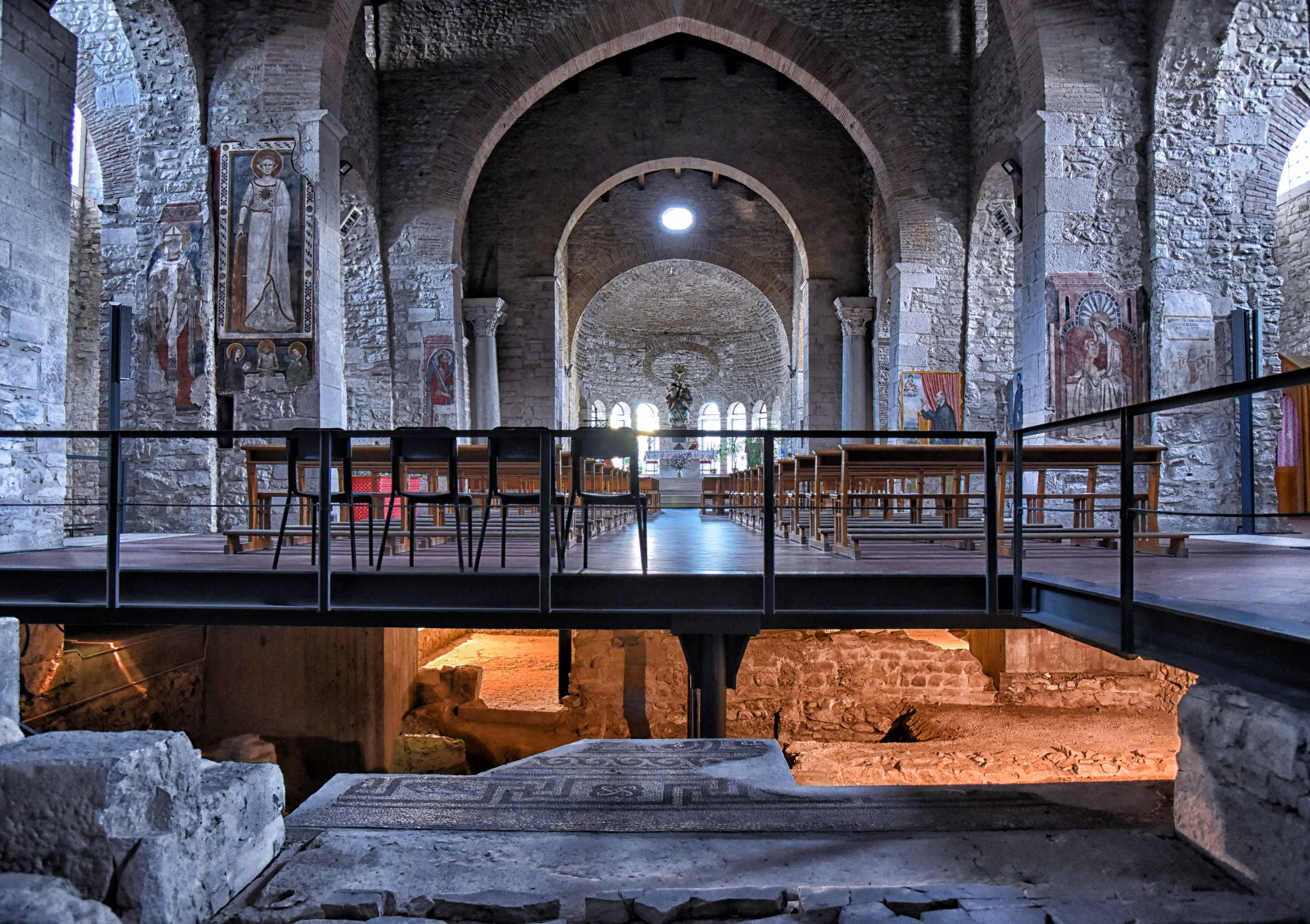
The interior of the old church

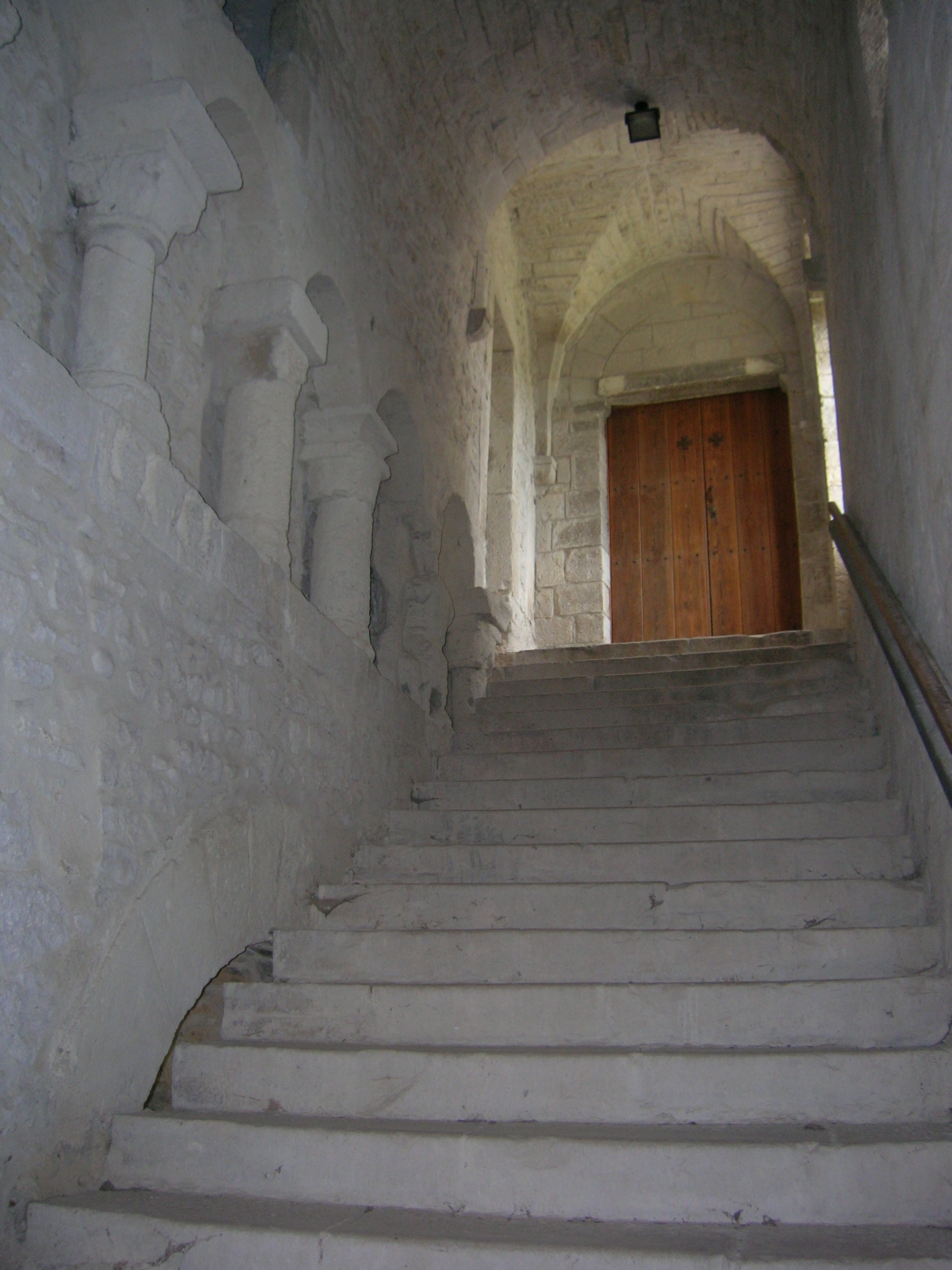
Stairs leading to the monastery

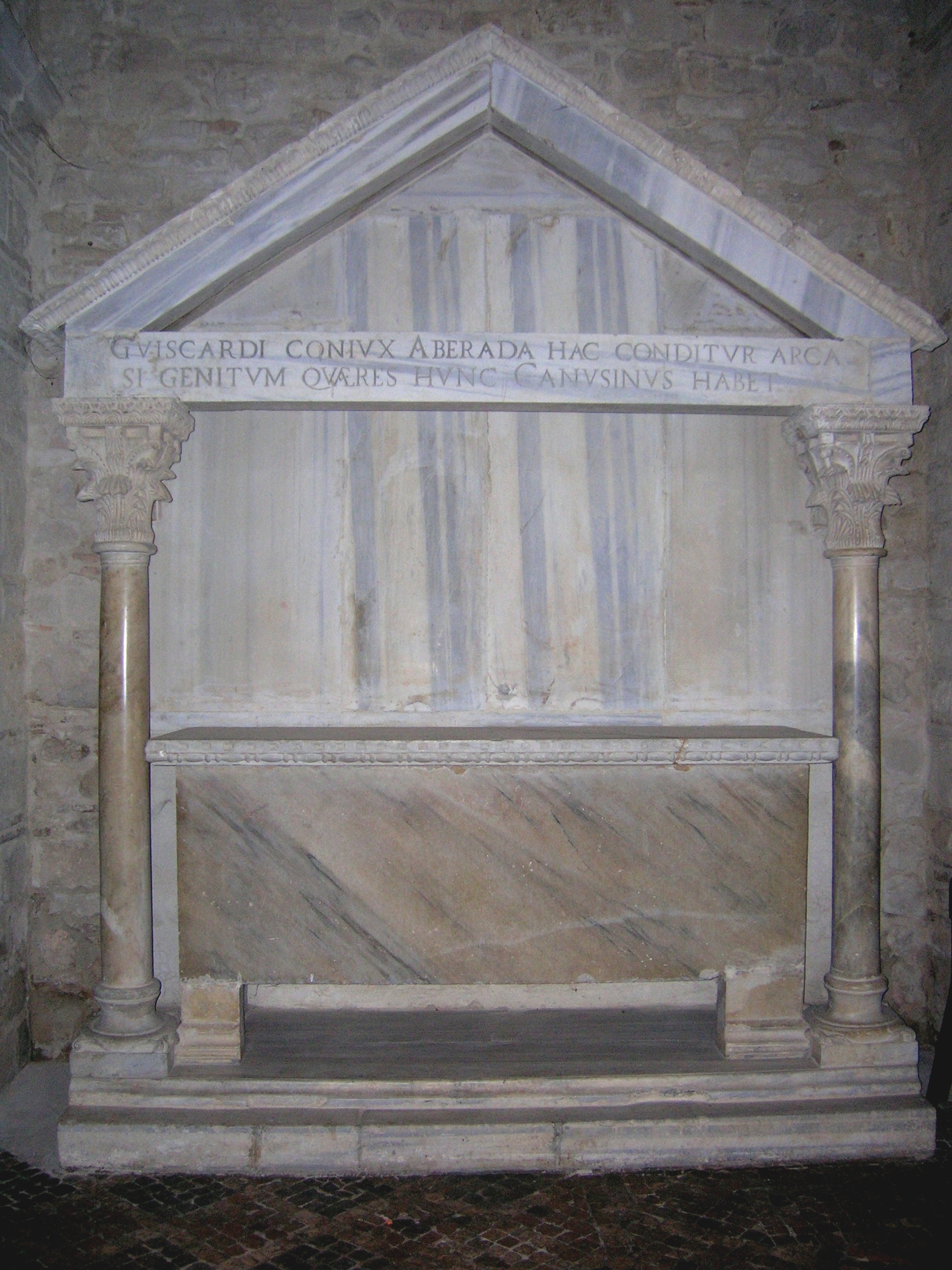
Tomb of Aberada

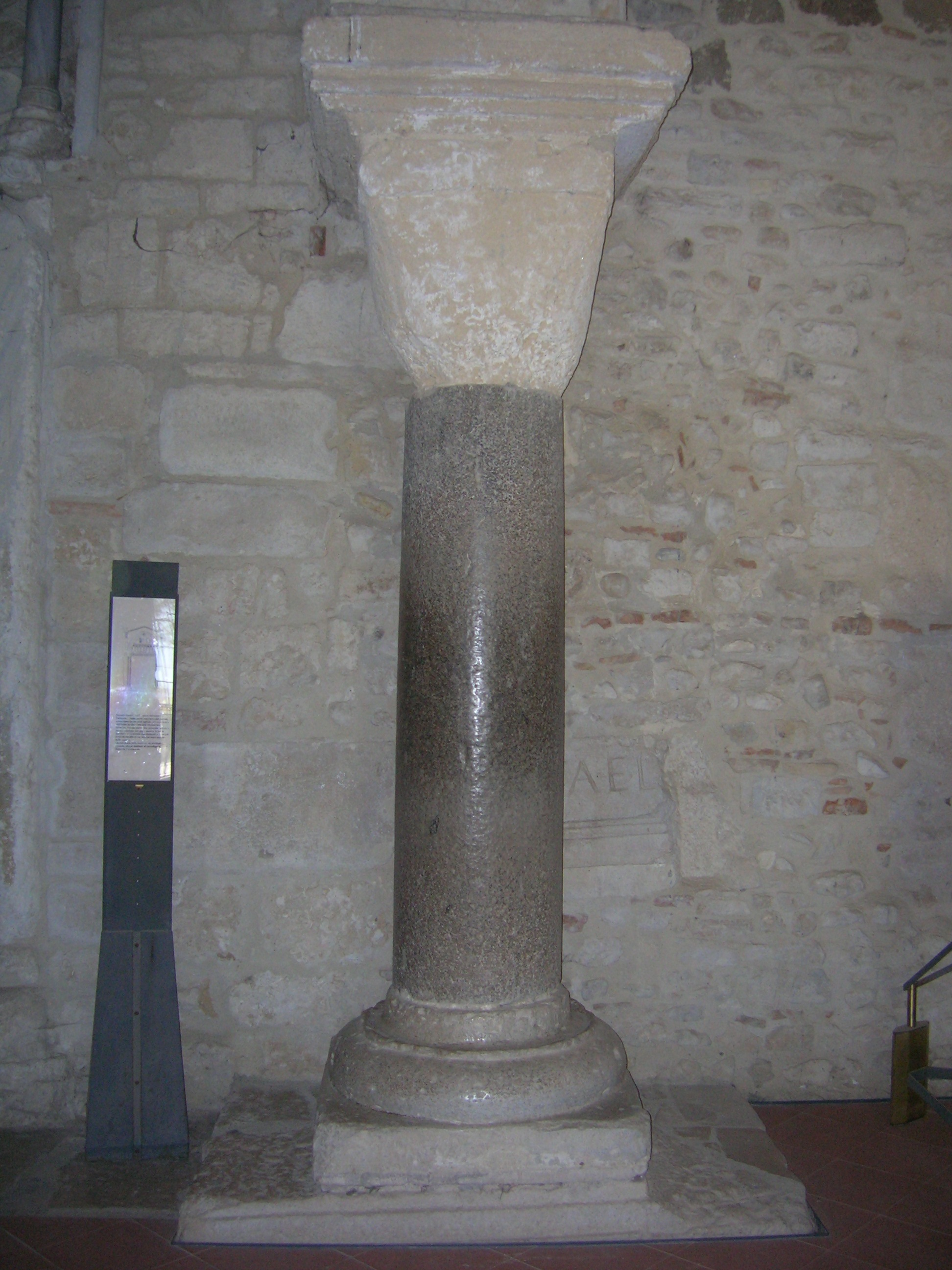
Column of Friendship

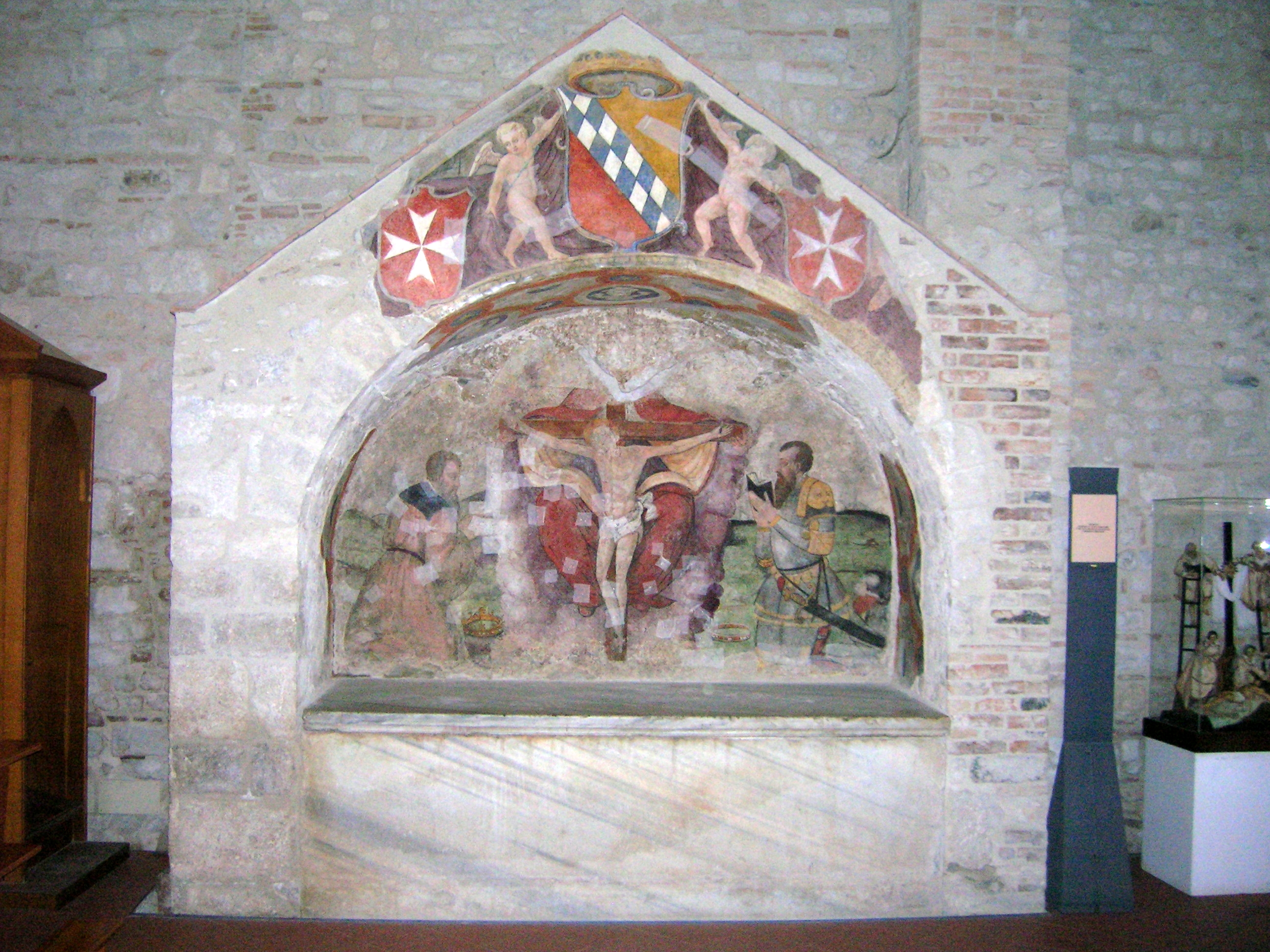
The Hauteville Tomb

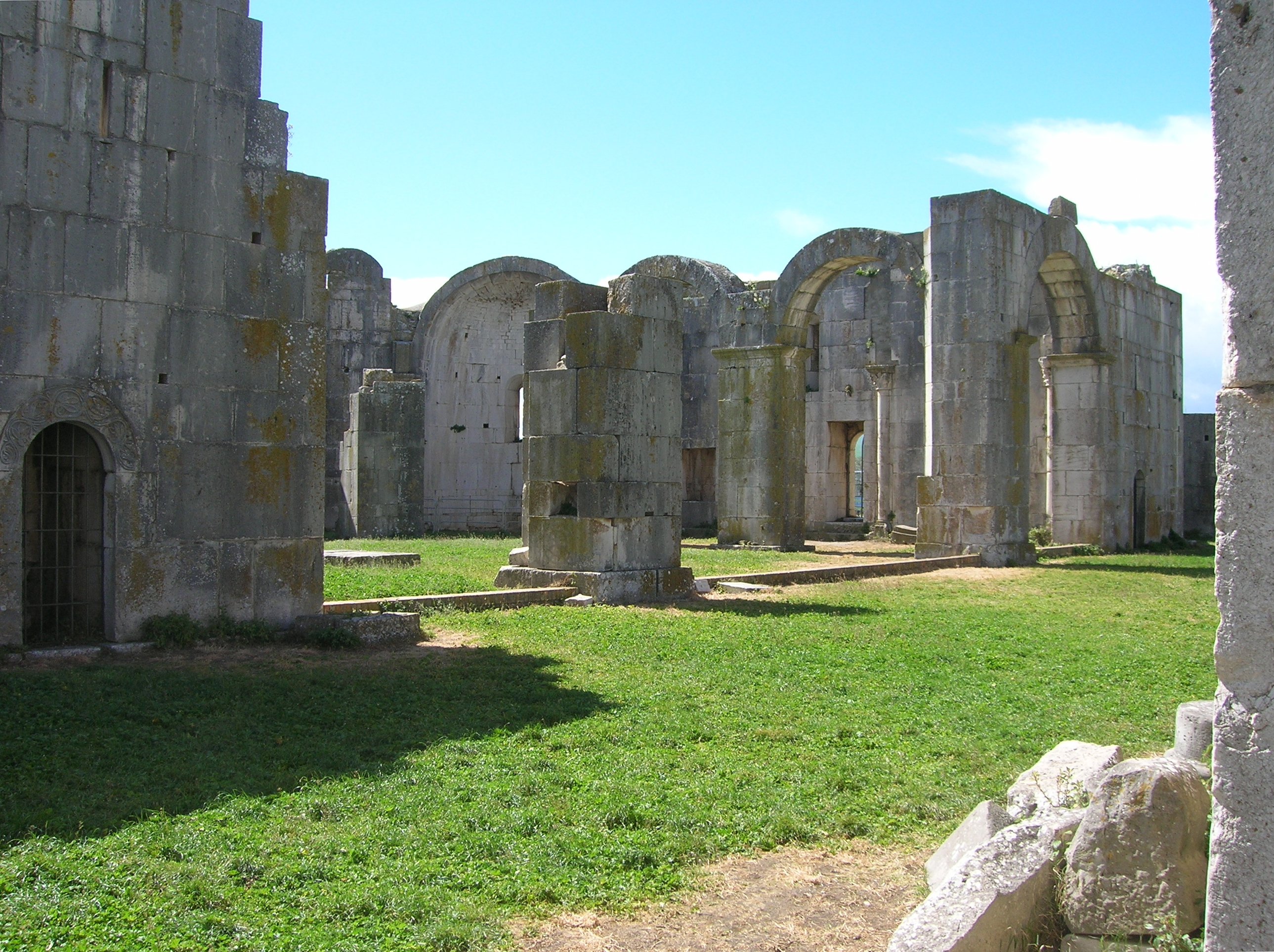
Interior of the Incompiuta

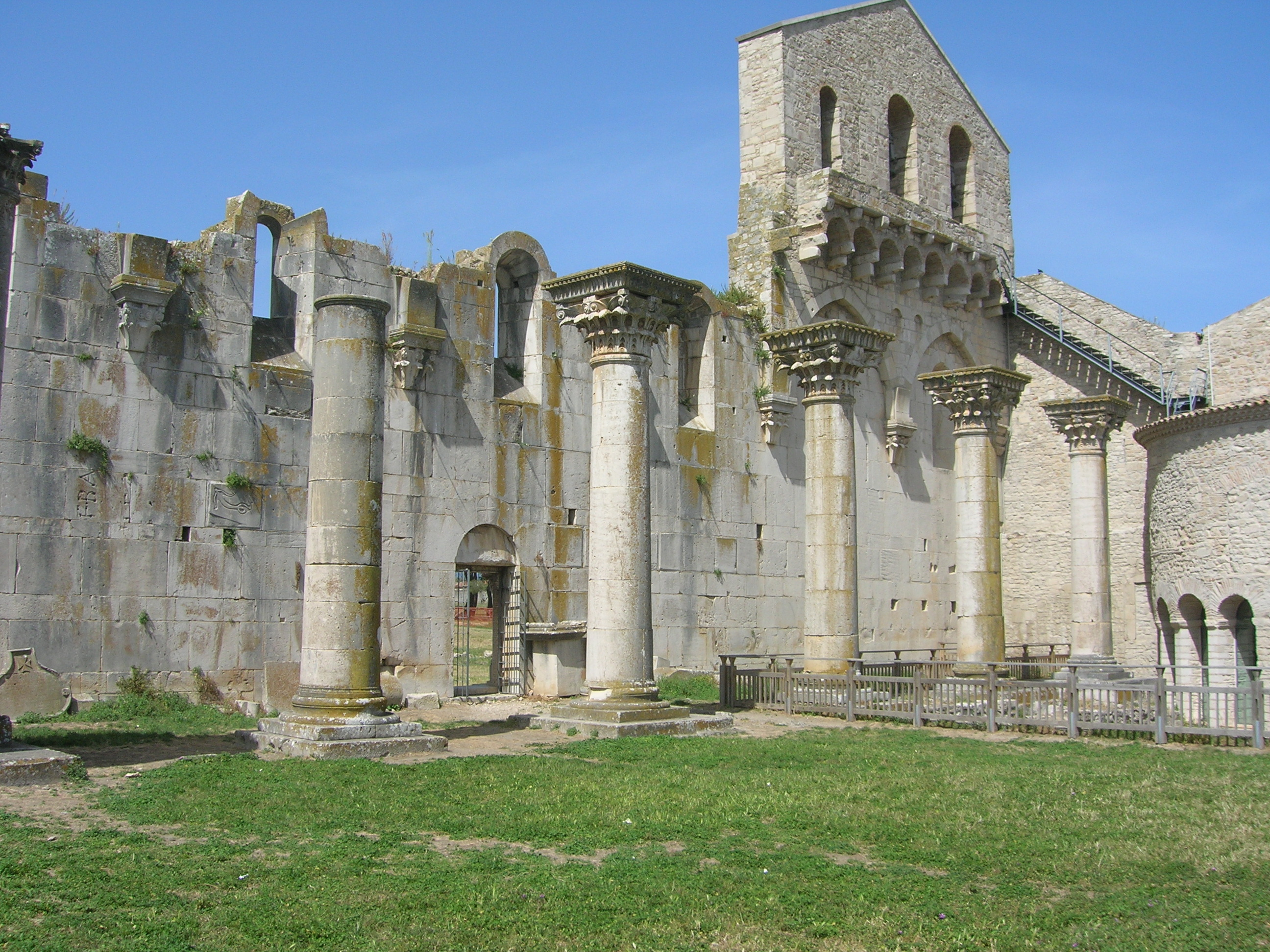
Interior of the Incompiuta

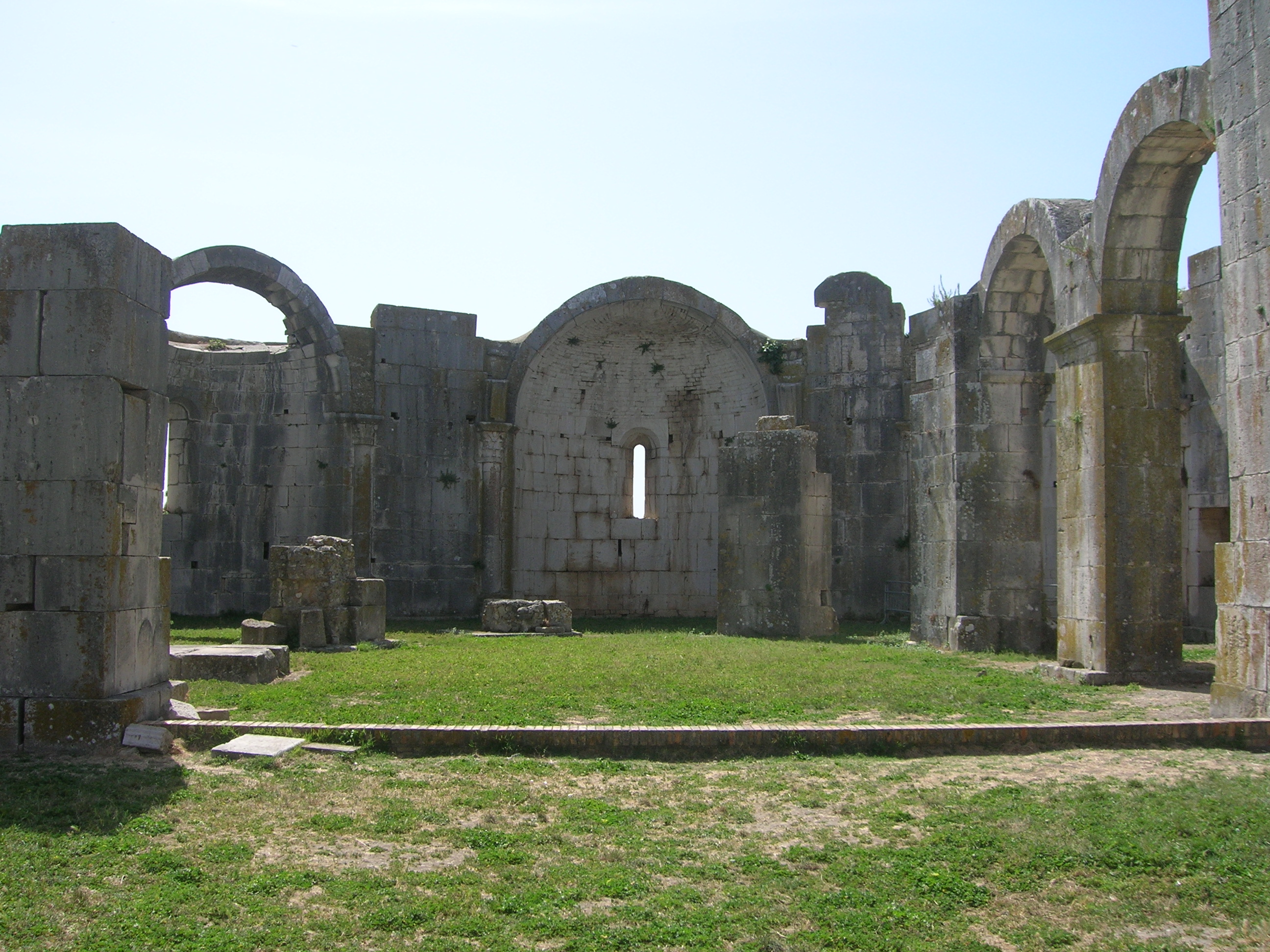
Interior of the Incompiuta
