= Fressenda =

11th-century Norman Noblewoman

- Lady of Hauteville-la-Guichard
- Born: c. 1000
- Died: c. 1060; Italy
- Buried: Benedictine Abbey of Sante-Eufemia
- Noble family: House of Normandy (possibly); House of Hauteville (by marriage)
- Spouse: Tancred of Hauteville
- Issue: Robert Guiscard; Mauger; William; Aubrey; Humbert; Tancred; Frumentin; Roger I; Fressenda (wife of Richard I of Capua)
- Father: Richard II of Normandy (disputed)

Fressenda (Latin: Frensendis or Fredesendis) was an 11th-century Norman noblewoman and the wife of Tancred of Hauteville. She is known as the mother of Robert Guiscard and Roger I of Sicily.

== Name ==
Goffredo Malaterra recorded her name as Frensendis and Orderic Vitalis as Fredesendis in latin. Her name has been anglicized as Fresenda or Fressenda in English literature.

== Origin ==
Fressenda's origin is not known. Contemporary historian Goffredo Malaterra, wrote that she was "a lady who in birth and morals was by no means inferior to his first wife." in reference to Tancred's first marriage who was of reputable birth.

Some historians have suggested that Fressenda was a illegitimate daughter of Richard II of Normandy. Historian Elisabeth van Houts dismisses this claim as a 16th-century myth without evidence.

Historian Graham Loud wrote that Girard of Buonalbergo might have been related to Fressenda to explain his unwavering loyalty towards Robert Guiscard, her son, despite Robert's divorce of Gerard's paternal aunt. He admits that it is only speculation.

== Biography ==
Fressenda's early life is unknown but at some point she married Tancred of Hauteville in Normandy. He was a widower petty lord of Hauteville-la-Guichard in western Normandy. Tancred's first wife was close to him but died when he was still young enough to remarry.

=== Family ===
With Tancred, Fressenda had at least seven sons and one daughter. Tancred had already got five sons from his first marriage. She is said to have raised all her sons and stepsons fairly.

Since Tancred’s patrimony was too small to divide equally between all of their 12 sons, it became necessary for them to seek fortune elsewhere. At first Fressenda's older stepsons left for Italy in c.1035. Upon hearing of their success in securing the county of Apulia and Calabria, her oldest son Robert Guiscard was called to join them soon followed by Mauger, William, the youngest son Roger. Her daughter Fressenda also left with the brothers and married a Norman lord, Richard I of Capua. Her remaining sons, Aubrey, Humbert, and Tancred appears to have stayed behind in Normandy and faded out of history. Fressenda herself left for Italy after the death of her husband at an unknown date.

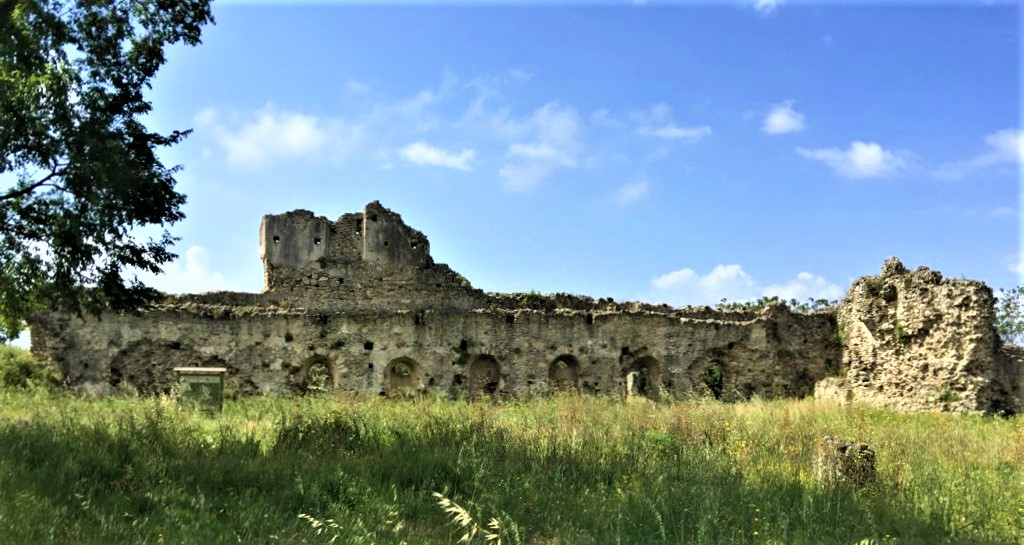
Ruins of the Abbey of Sainte-Eufemia.

=== Death ===
It is unknown when Fressenda died, but she was buried in the Abbey of Sainte-Eufemia that Duke Robert, her son, founded in 1062 for the abbot Robert de Grandmesnil who fled from Normandy. Fressenda's legacy survived through her sons, Robert Guiscard and Roger I of Sicily, both remembered as rulers in mainland Italy and the island of Sicily respectively.

=== Issue ===
- Robert Guiscard (d. 1085), duke of Apulia and Calabria
- Mauger (d. 1064)
- William (d. 1080)
- Aubrey
- Humbert
- Tancred
- Frumentin
- Roger (d. 1101), grand count of Sicily
- Fressenda (d. 1078), wife of Richard I of Capua
