= Hiallt =

Ancestor of the House of Hauteville

Hiallt (died 920), sometimes also called Hialt or Healthene, was a legendary Viking active in the 10th century. He is traditionally regarded as the eponymous ancestor of the House of Hauteville.

== Accounts ==
=== Ancestry ===
According to the genealogy presented by David Hughes, in his book “The British Chronicles”, Hiallt was the son of Ivor, son of Magnus, son of Olaf, son of Harald (or Arailt), son of Ivar (or Hingmar), son of Sveide, son of Ogier the Dane and his third wife Astritha, daughter of Gudfred of Denmark. All of these characters are obviously mostly legendary.

=== Descendance ===
Hiallt supposedly followed in the footsteps of Rollo and settled in Normandy. In the Cotentin Peninsula, he founded the village of Hialtus Villa (Hauteville, probably modern Hauteville-la-Guichard). He is considered by tradition the ancestor of Tancred of Hauteville, and thus of the whole House of Hauteville.
