= William of Hauteville =

William of Hauteville may refer to:

- William Iron Arm
- William of the Principate
- William II, Duke of Apulia
- William I of Sicily
- William II of Sicily
- William III of Sicily
