= Herman of Hauteville =

Herman of Hauteville (Ermanno d'Altavilla in Italian) (c. 1045 – 1097) was the younger son of Humphrey, count of Apulia and Calabria (1051–1057), and his Lombard wife, Gaitelgrima of Salerno, also known as Altrude. His older brother Abelard was supposed to inherit their father's lands, but Robert Guiscard, their uncle, who was elected count on Humphrey's death, confiscated them.

In 1064, Abelard was at the head of a revolt of the barons against the Guiscard. Robert put it down, but Herman was given as a hostage to the Greek catepan of Italy, Apochara, to ensure Abelard's continued loyalty. Upon his release, he went to Trani and held it during the revolt of 1071, when he lent his assistance to the rebels (including Abelard). In 1073, he was finally captured, by Guy, Duke of Sorrento, the constant ally of the Norman leadership in the Mezzogiorno. He was first imprisoned in Rapolla (at Melfi) and then taken to Mileto, then under Roger, Robert's brother. Eventually released, he travelled far away, to Constantinople. During Guiscard's Byzantine expedition of 1081–1082, he returned to the peninsula and took Cannae, which he held as count for over a decade before joining the Army of Bohemond, Robert's disinherited eldest son, on the First Crusade, where he was present at and died during the Siege of Antioch.
