= Mauger of Hauteville =

Norman Noble

Mauger of Hauteville (also Latin Malgerius or Italian Maugerio) was a younger (probably the second) son of Tancred of Hauteville by his second wife, Fressenda. He travelled to the Mezzogiorno with his brother William and his elder half-brother Geoffrey around 1053, though some sources indicate him coming later, c.1056.

He soon distinguished himself and was invested with the county of the Capitanate soon after his arrival (either 1053 or 1057) by Humphrey, his half brother and count of Apulia, but he did not long survive to hold it. According to Goffredo Malaterra, he died in 1054, though other chroniclers have him dying in 1057 or as late as 1060, after assisting his elder full brother Robert Guiscard, Humphrey's successor, in an expedition against the new army of the Byzantine Emperor Constantine X, sent to recover Langobardia. Whenever he died, his fief went to William, who passed it to Geoffrey out of fraternal affection (according to Malaterra).

== Sources ==
- Chalandon, Ferdinand. Histoire de la domination normande en Italie et en Sicile. Paris, 1907.
- Norwich, John Julius. The Normans in the South 1016-1130. Longmans: London, 1967.
