= Pandulf of Capaccio =

First Lombard lord of Capaccio

Pandulf or Paldolf (Note: His name in Latin is given as Pandulfus, Pandolfus or Paldolfus, in Italian as Pandolfo or Paldolfo. In some sources, he is called Landulf (Landulfus) because of inconsistencies in surviving documents.) (died June 1052) was the first Lombard lord (dominus) (Note: The title dominus was restricted to the Salernitan princely family during this period. Some sources call Pandulf a "duke of Capaccio".) of Capaccio in the Principality of Salerno.

Pandulf was the youngest son of Prince Guaimar III of Salerno and his second wife Gaitelgrima. He was born in the 1010s. The death of his elder half-brother, Prince John (III), in 1018 allowed him to inherit the lordship of Capaccio. A document of 1092 from the abbey of La Trinità della Cava, records how the division of the principality of Guaimar III was definitively effected between his sons in 1042, with the eldest, Guaimar IV, taking Salerno, his second son Guy taking Sorrento and Pandulf left with Capaccio.

Pandulf was married to Theodora, daughter of Count Gregory II of Tusculum and thus niece of Pope Benedict IX. They had five sons—Gregory, John, Guaimar, Gisulf and Guy—and at least one daughter, Sichelgarda or Sichelgaita. There is some discrepancy as to how many times, and to whom, the latter was married. Her recorded husbands are the Normans Ascittinus of Sicigiano, and Roger of San Severino. She may have had an earlier marriage to Geoffrey of Medania. Pandulf's descendants were numerous, among them were the Lombard and Norman lords of Trentenaria, Corneto, Fasanella, Novi and San Severino.

In July 1047, Bishop Amatus of Pesto (Note: Pesto, ancient Paestum, is now a frazione of Capaccio.) exempted a church built and owned by Pandulf in Capaccio from episcopal authority, recognised its right to perform baptisms and confirmed Pandulf's right to choose whether the clergy of the church were secular or monastic. In return for these rights in his church, Pandulf paid the bishop six pounds of silver. Pandulf also owned the monastery of Saint Sophia in Salerno itself. After his death, it reverted to a church and was in ruins when acquired by La Trinità della Cava in 1100.

Pandulf was assassinated alongside his brother Guaimar IV in June 1052. (The exact date is given variously as 2, 3 or 4 June.) They were the victims of a conspiracy among the Salernitan cavalry, provoked by the counts of Teano, in favour of Pandulf III.
