= Robert Scalio =

Robert de Hauteville (born early 1060s?), also called Robert Scalio or Robert Guiscard II, was a younger son of Robert Guiscard, Duke of Apulia, and his second wife, Sikelgaita. The sources do not agree concerning whether he was older or younger than his brother Guy. Romuald of Salerno lists him before Guy.

Robert accompanied his elder brother Roger Borsa in 1086, when the latter went to Palermo to confirm his possessions in the County of Sicily. He signed as a witness the document issued by Roger granting to the abbey of La Cava the monastery of the Holy Spirit in Bari. He is last recorded in Sicily in 1096.

John Tuzson argues that Robert later moved to Hungary in the following of his cousin, Queen Felicia, the wife of King Coloman of Hungary. Felicia, unnamed, is described as "a lady of the highest nobility, daughter of King Robert Guiscard of Apulia" in the 14th-century Chronicon Pictum. It is universally recognized that her father could not have been Robert Guiscard. It has generally been concluded that he was in fact Prince Robert I of Capua, but Tuzson argues that he was Count Roger I of Sicily, Robert Guiscard's brother. He connects the younger Robert Guiscard and the queen's entourage to the Hungarian kindred of Oliver and Ratold, which the Chronicon claims originated in Caserta.
