= Serlo I of Hauteville =

French Noble

- Seigneur of Hauteville-la-Guichard
- Predecessor: Tancred
- Noble family: Hauteville
- Issue: Serlo
- Father: Tancred
- Mother: Muriella

Serlo of Hauteville (also spelled Sarlo, fl. between 1027–35) (Note: 1027-35 are the years of Robert I, Duke of Normandy on the throne. Since Goffredo Malaterra records a story that happened during his reign, Sarlo was obviously surely alive in that time period) was a son of Tancred of Hauteville by his first wife Muriella. Unlike his brothers, who left for Southern Italy, Serlo remained in Normandy and inherited his father’s possessions.

== Birth order ==
Goffredo Malaterra records him as being Tancred’s youngest son by Muriella. The Annales of Romuald Guarna, on the other hand, name him as his first son. Since Serlo remained in Normandy to inherit his father’s lands, while his brothers went to southern Italy, it is more probable that Serlo was indeed the eldest son.

== Life ==
Serlo was a soldier of Robert, Duke of Normandy, and he was considered one of the best knights in Normandy.

Goffredo Malaterra records that Serlo was once “wronged” by a powerful man, and thus he killed him. Not to suffer the anger of Duke Robert, as an order to drive him out of the duchy had already been given, he fled to Brittany. From there, he sent envoys to try to secure peace with the Duke, but upon failing, he started to launch raids into Normandy. On one occasion, Duke Robert was besieging a castle called Tillières, on the border between Normandy and France. Supposedly - still according to Malaterra's story - a French soldier left the fortification everyday, seeking single combat with Norman soldiers, but the duke forbade them to challenge him, fearing the loss of his men.

Serlo (who was still in Brittany) was told of this, and, refusing to withstand the shame brought upon his people, he traveled to Tillières accompanied by two squires. Serlo fought and killed the French soldier, parading through the Norman camp with his severed head on a spear, before returning to Brittany. At this point Duke Robert sent an envoy to find out who killed the French soldier, and upon discovering that it was Serlo, he pardoned him and welcomed him back into Normandy. His possessions were restored to him, he was given a wife who also had some properties, and the duke treated him as one of his followers.

== Marriage and children ==
Sarlo's wife, who according to Malaterra had been given to him, was the heiress of the lordship of Pirou. He only had one known son, also named Serlo.

== Sources ==
- Goffredo Malaterra. The Deeds of Count Roger of Calabria and Sicily and of Duke Robert Guiscard his brother.
- Norwich, John Julius. The Normans in the South 1016-1130. Longmans: London, 1967.
- Ghisalberti, Albert (ed). Dizionario Biografico degli Italiani: II Albicante – Ammannati. Rome, 1960.
- Van Houts, Elizabeth, ed. (2000). The Normans in Europe. Manchester University Press.
