= Treaty of Melfi =

1059 pact of pope with Norman princes

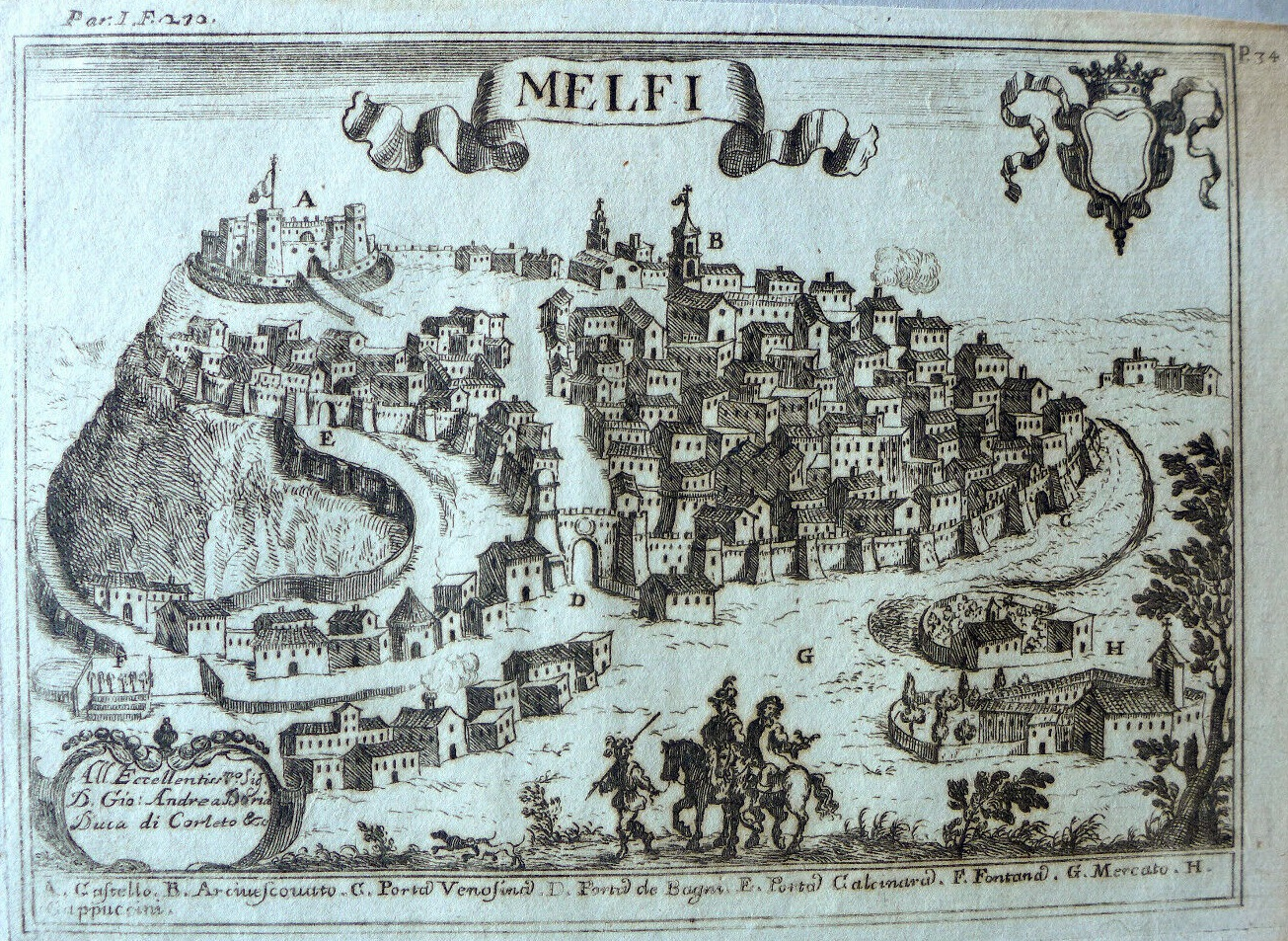
A stamp of Melfi

The Treaty of Melfi or Concordat of Melfi was signed on 23 August 1059 between Pope Nicholas II and the Norman princes Robert Guiscard and Richard I of Capua. Based on the terms of the accord, the Pope recognized the Norman conquest of Southern Italy. Moreover, the Pope recognized Robert Guiscard as Duke of Apulia and Calabria, and as Count of Sicily.

== See also ==
- Battle of Civitate
- List of treaties
