= Tancred of Hauteville =

Norman Noble

- Seigneur of Hauteville-la-Guichard
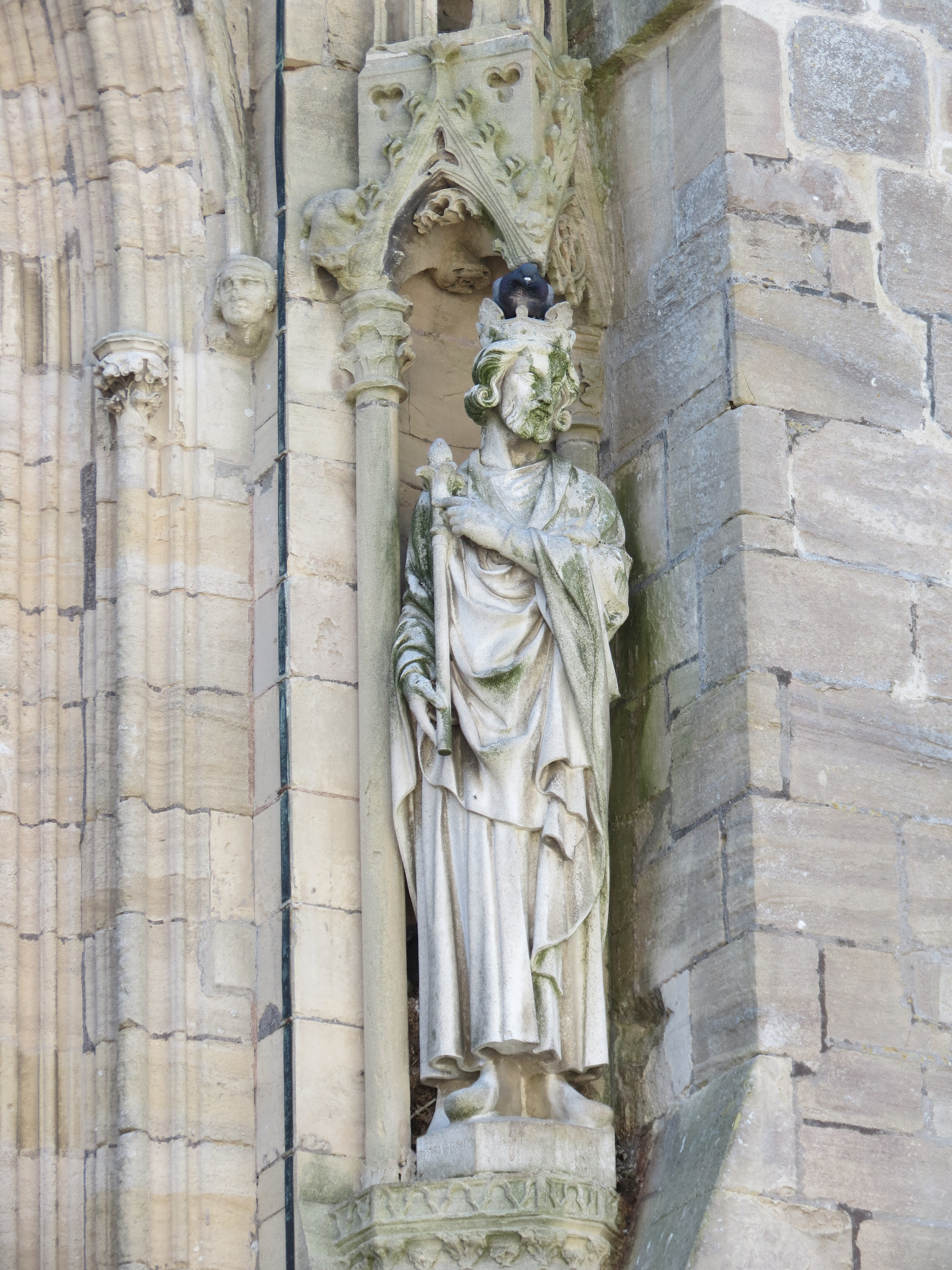
- Statue of Tancred outside Coutances Cathedral, dated to 1875
- Successor: Serlo I
- Born: c. 980
- Died: 1041
- Noble family: Hauteville
- Spouses: Muriella; Fressenda
- Issue: see below

Tancred of Hauteville (c. 980 – 1041) was an 11th-century Norman lord. Little is known about him, and he is best remembered by the achievements of his twelve sons. Various legends arose about Tancred, but they have no supporting contemporary evidence that has survived the ages.

== Life and marriages ==
Tancred was a minor landowner in Normandy. Goffredo Malaterra says that he was a knight of very noble lineage, who inherited the village of Hauteville (probably Hauteville-la-Guichard, north-west of Coutances, in Normandy) from his ancestors. On the other hand, Anna Komnene, in the Alexiad, describes his son Robert as of insignificant origin.

In his youth, Tancred dedicated himself to his military abilities, and jumped through a number of different courts. Supposedly, while residing at the court of Richard II, Duke of Normandy, he went hunting with him, and heroically killed a boar. Instead of being punished (as it was medieval custom that only the duke could slay the hunt’s target), Tancred was praised for his actions. From then on, he served in the duke’s court, commanding a small group of ten knights on his behalf. Aside from this tale, little else is known about him, and he doesn't seem to have had any exceptional characteristic, aside from his persistent fecundity.

His first wife was a certain Muriella, whom Malaterra records being "distinguished for her morals and noble birth". When Muriella died, Tancred married Fressenda, whom, according to Malaterra, "in birth and morals was by no means inferior to his first wife". Malaterra specifies the reasons of Tancred's choice to remarry:

Since he was not yet old, he did not feel ready to practice continence, but being an honest man and abhorring illicit relationships, he took a second wife. In fact, remembering the words of [ Paul ] the Apostle: "to avoid fornication, every man should have his own wife, and then the Lord will judge the libertines and adulterers", he preferred to content himself with a legitimate wife rather than be tainted by the embraces of concubines.

== Issue ==
Coat-of-arms of Hauteville

With his first wife, Muriella, he had at least five sons:

- Serlo I, succeeded him as Seigneur of Hauteville-la-Guichard
- Geoffrey, Count of the Capitanate
- William Iron Arm, Count of Apulia (d. 1046)
- Drogo, Count of Apulia and Calabria (d. 1051)
- Humphrey, Count of Apulia and Calabria (d. 1057)

With his second wife, Fressenda, he had at least eight more sons and one daughter:

- Robert Guiscard, Duke of Apulia and Calabria (d. 1085)
- Mauger, count of the Capitanate (d. 1064)
- Fressenda, who married Richard I, Prince of Capua
- William, count of the Principate (d. 1080)
- Aubrey
- Hubert
- Tancred
- Frumentin
- Roger, count of Sicily (d. 1101)

Finally, the Annales of Romuald Guarna state that Tancred had three daughters, but without naming them or stating by which marriage they were born. One of these daughters is the Fressenda named above, who married Richard I of Capua. One of the two remaining daughters is sometimes given the name Beatrice, and has been erroneously identified as the mother of Geoffrey, Count of Conversano. All of the informations regarding her are dubious.
