= Guy of Hauteville =

Italian crusader

Guy of Hauteville (Italian Guido d'Altavilla; c.1065 – died 5 July 1108) was an Italo-Norman soldier and diplomat who for a time served the Byzantine Empire.

Guy was a younger son of Robert Guiscard, Duke of Apulia, and his second wife, Sichelgaita. He was probably named after his maternal uncle, Guy, Duke of Sorrento.

During his father's expedition against the Byzantine Empire in 1081, he occupied Vlorë in Albania. He was present at his father's death in Greece on 17 July 1085.

After his father's death, Guy entered the service of his erstwhile enemy, Emperor Alexios I Komnenos. According to the emperor's daughter, Anna Komnene, he was drawn to Byzantine service by certain promises made by Alexios. At the Byzantine court, Guy became one of Alexios' most trusted councilors and was rewarded with the rank of sebastos. In August 1096, he helped negotiate between the Alexios and the leaders of the First Crusade, even serving as a hostage for the emperor's good faith during the dealings with Godfrey of Bouillon. Guy was with the Byzantine army campaigning in Asia Minor when, at Philomelium around 20 June 1098, it was met by the nominal leader of the Crusade, Stephen, Count of Blois, who reported that the siege of Antioch was going very badly.

In 1108, Guy was with his half-brother, Bohemond, when the latter attacked Byzantine Dyrrachium. Defeated, Bohemond sued for peace and during the negotiations Guy was entrusted with keeping the Byzantine hostages. He returned to Italy shortly after and died there on 5 July 1108, as recorded in the necrology of the Cathedral of San Matteo in Salerno.
