= Humphrey of Hauteville =

Count of Apulia and Calabria from 1051 to 1057

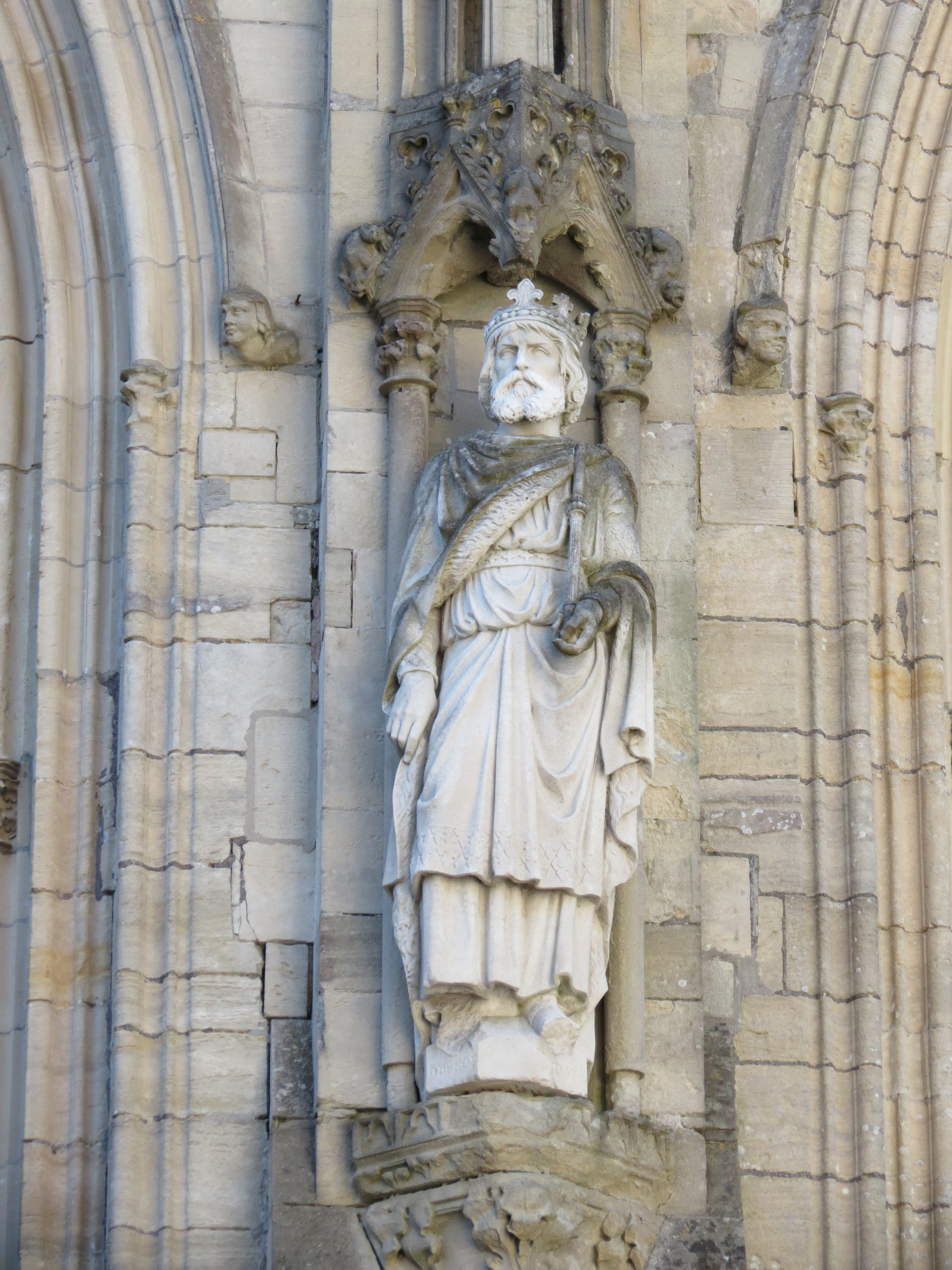
- Statue of Humphrey outside Coutances Cathedral

Count of Apulia and Calabria
- Reign: 10 August 1051 - August 1057
- Predecessor: Drogo
- Successor: Robert Guiscard
- Died: August 1057
- Noble family: Hauteville
- Spouse: Gaitelgrima of Sorrento
- Issue: Geoffrey; Joscelin; Abelard; Herman
- Father: Tancred
- Mother: Muriella

Humphrey of Hauteville (died August 1057), also nicknamed Abelard, was the third Norman Count of Apulia. He succeeded his brother Drogo.

== Life ==
Humphrey was a son of Tancred of Hauteville by his first wife Muriella. Goffredo Malaterra records him as being the third son, after William Iron Arm and Drogo, while Romuald Guarna records him as being the fifth, coming after Serlo, Geoffrey, Drogo and William. Regardless, it is unlikely anyway that Humphrey was older than Serlo, as Serlo stayed in Normandy to inherit their father’s possessions, while Humphrey journeyed to Southern Italy.

Since Tancred had many sons, and his possessions weren’t enough to satisfy all of them, Humphrey and many of his brothers were soon forced to seek fortune elsewhere.

=== First years in Southern Italy ===
Goffredo Malaterra and Amatus of Montecassino record that Humphrey journeyed to Southern Italy with his brothers William Iron Arm and Drogo, around 1035/7, to strengthen the ranks of Rainulf Drengot, Count of Aversa. Chalandon, however, believes that he followed his brothers years later, between 1043 and 1045, as he is not recorded among the Normans who elected William Iron Arm in 1042.

Anyway, in 1042, Humphrey's brother William was elected Count of Apulia. In 1046 he was succeeded by Drogo, whom, at the end of the same year, granted Humphrey the lordship of Lavello. In 1048, during some hostilities between Normans and Byzantines, Humphrey also conquered Troia and Vaccarizza, and he helped his young half-brother Robert Guiscard, who had just arrived in Southern Italy, to settle down.

=== Count of Apulia ===
His reign began amid the troubles which had ended his brother's. Humphrey vigorously punished the instigators of his brother's assassination, especially the principal murderer. Many Norman knights were in rebellion and pillaging papal lands. Guaimar IV of Salerno supported Humphrey's succession, but he was soon assassinated. Pope Leo IX organised a coalition against the Normans and marched south. The pope's forces and those of the Normans fought the Battle of Civitate near Civitate sul Fortore on 18 June 1053. Humphrey led the armies of the Hautevilles (assisted by his younger half-brother Robert Guiscard) and Drengots (assisted by Richard Drengot) against the combined forces of the Papacy and the Holy Roman Empire. The Normans destroyed the papal army and captured the pope, whom they imprisoned in Benevento, which they had been authorised by the emperor to capture in 1047. They finally released him on 12 March 1054. Leo died soon after. In 1053, Humphrey also received his three brothers, Geoffrey and their half-brothers Mauger and a younger William, on their arrival in Italy. He granted Mauger the Capitanate and William the Principate.

In the aftermath of Civitate, the Normans under Humphrey took advantage of the severely weakened papacy to further their conquest. He took Oria, Nardò, and Lecce by the end of 1055. Robert Guiscard, the hero of Civitate, meanwhile conquered Minervino Murge, Otranto, and Gallipoli, before Humphrey sent him back to Calabria in fear of his growing power and influence. Upon his death in 1057 (or 1056 according to some sources), Humphrey was succeeded as count by Robert. Humphrey had given Guiscard the guardianship of his young sons, but Guiscard confiscated their inheritance.

== Issue ==
Humphrey married Gaitelgrima, daughter of Guaimar III, whom Amatus of Montecassino calls a sister of the Duke of Sorrento. It is often stated that this Gaitelgrima was the same as Gaitelgrima of Salerno, the widow of his brother Drogo; however, this is impossible. Humphrey and Gaitelgrima had four sons:

- Geoffrey
- Joscelin
- Abelard
- Herman

We also know that they had a daughter, as Amatus of Montecassino records that Robert Guiscard pursued "Abelard and Gradilon, the husband of his sister" after the former's rebellion in 1078.

== Sources ==
- Ghisalberti, Albert (ed). Dizionario Biografico degli Italiani: II Albicante – Ammannati. Rome, 1960.
- Gwatkin, H. M., Whitney, J. P. (ed) et al. The Cambridge Medieval History: Volume III. Cambridge University Press, 1926.
- Norwich, John Julius. The Normans in the South 1016–1130. Longmans, London, 1967.
- Chalandon, Ferdinand. Histoire de la domination normande en Italie et en Sicile. Picard, Paris, 1907.
- Gravett, Christopher, and Nicolle, David. The Normans: Warrior Knights and their Castles. Osprey Publishing: Oxford, 2006.
- Beech, George. A Norman-Italian Adventurer in the East: Richard of Salerno. 1993.

Italian royalty
Preceded by Drogo	Count of Apulia and Calabria; 1051–1057	Succeeded by Robert Guiscard
