= Guy, Duke of Sorrento =

Guy (Italian: Guido; born c. 1012) was the Lombard duke of Sorrento from 1039. He was the younger brother of Prince Guaimar IV of Salerno, father-in-law of William Iron Arm and William of the Principate, and brother-in-law of Humphrey of Hauteville. According to John Julius Norwich, he was a "selfless" prince, exhibiting a "moral sense rare for [his] time and position."

Duchy of Sorrento around 1000

Guy was the son of Guaimar III and Gaitelgrima. He was the count of Conza before he became duke. Between July and August 1039, his brother conquered Sorrento in 1035 and bestowed it on him as a duchy.

Guy was a consistent supporter of his brother and the Normans. During the assassination of Guaimar, he was the only member of the family to escape capture by the assassins. He quickly flew to the Normans of Melfi, whom he paid highly for aid. He brought them back with his own Sorrentine army to besiege Salerno, wherein the conspirators had fortified themselves. Guy had soon captured all of the conspirators' families and had negotiated the release of his nephew, Gisulf. Guy accepted their surrender soon after and promised them no harm. The Normans, not bound, they said, by Guy's oath, massacred the four brothers and 36 others, one for each stab wound found in Guaimar's body. Guy enthroned his nephew and he and his Normans, who would have preferred Guy as prince, did immediate homage to him. Gisulf was constrained by the Normans to recognize Guy as duke of Sorrento.

In 1073, Guy captured the rebel Herman, his own nephew, and handed him over to Robert Guiscard, his nephew-in-law. Guy died amidst the breakup of the great principality his brother had forged and he had preserved. With his death, Sorrento became independent once more.

== Issue ==
Among his children were:

- Guida, wife of William Iron Arm
- Maria, wife of William of the Principate
- Guaimar, who made donations for the good of his father's soul in 1091 and 1096
