= William of the Principate =

William of Hauteville (c. 1027 – 1080) was one of the younger sons of Tancred of Hauteville by his second wife Fressenda. He is usually called Willermus instead of Wilelmus in Latin annals and so is often called Guillerm instead of Guillaume in French.

== Life ==
William left Normandy around 1053 with his elder half-brother Geoffrey and full brother Mauger. He participated in the Battle of Civitate in the years of his arrival and was received cordially by his half-brother Humphrey, the reigning count of Apulia.

In 1055, he distinguished himself in the taking of the castle of San Nicandro (today San Licandro) close to Eboli, which formed the nucleus of his county of the Principato, with which he was invested by Humphrey in 1055. In 1058, he married Maria, the daughter of Guy, Duke of Sorrento and brother of Guaimar IV of Salerno. He inherited all Guy's lands in the principality of Salerno and fought with Guaimar's successor, Gisulf II, whose lands he ate away at until little was left but Salerno itself. He also inherited the Capitanate from Mauger, who died between 1054 and 1060. That last possession he gave to Geoffrey, out of fraternal love, Malaterra informs us.

He invited his landless youngest brother Roger to join him, promising him half of all he owned, save his wife and children. He aided Roger against their elder brother Robert Guiscard, who had succeeded Humphrey, and gave him the castle of Scalea, at Catanzaro. He fought against Robert later when Robert came to the aid of Gisulf in order to receive in marriage Gisulf's sister Sichelgaita. In 1067, the Council of Melfi excommunicated him, along with Turgis de Rota and Guimond de Moulins, for stealing property from the church of Alfano I, Archbishop of Salerno. Later that year, he travelled to Salerno to reconcile with Pope Alexander II.

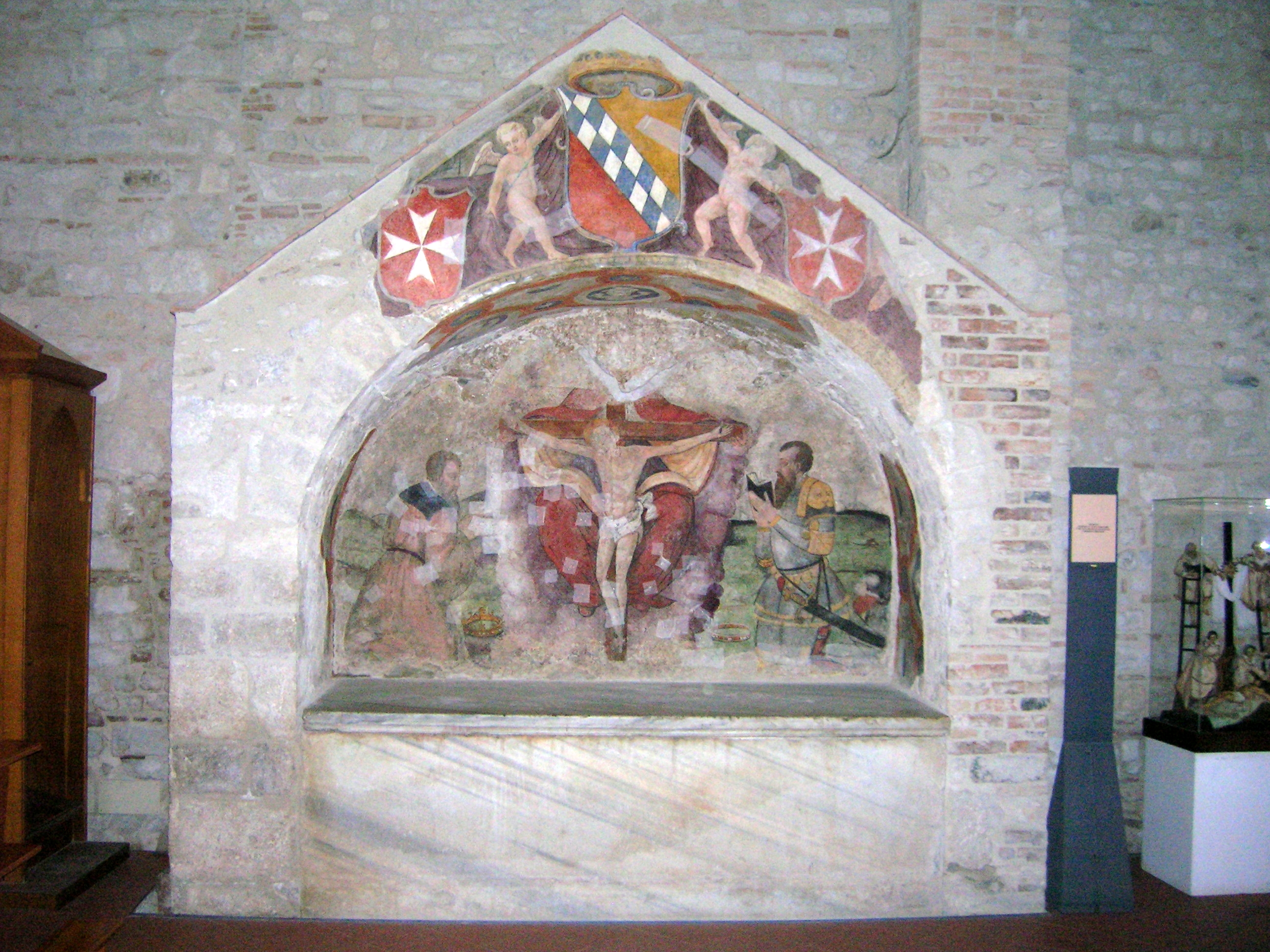
Family grave of the Hauteville, Abbey of the Santissima Trinità, Venosa

According to some sources, he died in 1080, though others have him living into the twelfth century (to 1104, 1113, or 1117) and participating in the Guiscard's Byzantine campaigns and being present at the Battle of Durazzo, October 1081. He was buried in the church of the Santissima Trinità in Venosa.

== Marriage and issue ==
In 1058, he married Maria, the daughter of Guy, Duke of Sorrento. They had three sons, among which:

- Richard of Salerno, participant in the First Crusade
- Robert of the Principate

== Sources ==
- Goffredo Malaterra. The Deeds of Count Roger of Calabria and Sicily and of Duke Robert Guiscard his brother.
- Norwich, John Julius. The Normans in the South 1016–1130. Longmans: London, 1967.
- Ghisalberti, Albert (ed). Dizionario Biografico degli Italiani: II Albicante – Ammannati. Rome, 1960.
