= Robert Guiscard =

Duke of Apulia and Calabria (1015–1085)

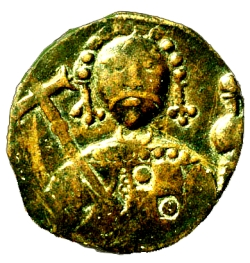
- Coin of Robert Guiscard bearing his portrait

Duke of Apulia and Calabria
- Reign: 23 August 1059 – 17 July 1085
- Predecessor: Title created
- Successor: Roger Borsa

Count of Apulia and Calabria
- Reign: August 1057 – 23 August 1059
- Predecessor: Humphrey of Hauteville

Lord of Sicily
- Reign: Invested on 23 August 1059
- Successor: Roger I (as Count)

Prince of Benevento
- Reign: 1078 – 1081
- Predecessor: Landulf VI
- Successor: Title extinct
- Born: c. 1015; Hauteville-la-Guichard or somewhere else in Cotentin, Duchy of Normandy
- Died: 17 July 1085 (aged 69–70); Cephalonia, Byzantine Empire
- Burial: Abbey of the Santissima Trinità, Venosa
- Spouses: Alberada of Buonalbergo; Sikelgaita
- Issue: See below
- Noble family: Hauteville
- Father: Tancred of Hauteville
- Mother: Fressenda
- Religion: Catholic

Robert Guiscard (/ɡiːˈskɑːr/ ghee-SKAR, Modern French: [ʁɔbɛʁ ɡiskaʁ]; c. 1015 – 17 July 1085), also referred to as Robert de Hauteville, was a Norman adventurer remembered for his conquest of southern Italy and Sicily in the 11th century.

Robert was born into the Hauteville family in Normandy, the sixth son of Tancred de Hauteville and his wife Fressenda. He inherited the County of Apulia and Calabria from his brother in 1057, and in 1059 he was made Duke of Apulia and Calabria and Lord of Sicily by Pope Nicholas II. He was also briefly Prince of Benevento (1078–1081), before returning the title to the papacy.

== Name ==
Robert's sobriquet, "Guiscard" (in contemporary Latin Viscardus and Old French Viscart, closely related to the English word "wiseacre", which archaically meant 'wise man'), is often rendered as "the Resourceful", "the Cunning", "the Wily", "the Fox", or "the Weasel". In Italian sources he is known as Roberto il Guiscardo or Roberto d'Altavilla (meaning Robert Guiscard and Robert de Hauteville), while medieval Arabic sources call him simply Abārt al-dūqa (Duke Robert). The name was also spelled "Wishart" among his descendants in Scotland.

== Historical background ==
From 999 to 1042, different Normans began migrating to Italy, where they mainly worked as mercenaries, serving at various times the Byzantines and a number of Lombard nobles. The first of the independent Norman lords was Rainulf Drengot, who established himself in the fortress of Aversa, becoming Count of Aversa and Duke of Gaeta.

In 1038, William Iron Arm and Drogo, the eldest sons of Tancred of Hauteville (Seigneur of Hauteville-La-Guichard, a town in Cotentin, Normandy), and elder brothers of Robert Guiscard, arrived in Italy. The two joined a revolt against the Byzantine rule of Apulia, started by the Lombards. By 1040 the Byzantines had lost most of the province. In 1042 a group of Normans settled in Apulia and chose Melfi as their capital; in September of the same year they elected William Iron Arm as their count, who was succeeded in turn by his brothers Drogo, comes Normannorum totius Apuliæ e Calabriæ ("the count of all Normans in Apulia and Calabria"), and after him Humphrey, who arrived around 1044.

== Arrival in Italy ==
Robert Guiscard was born around 1015, a son of Tancred of Hauteville and his second wife Fressenda, and the sixth of Tancred's twelve sons. According to the Byzantine historian Anna Komnene, he left Normandy to follow his brothers' footsteps with only five mounted riders and thirty followers on foot. Upon arriving in southern Italy in 1047, he became the chief of a roving band of robbers. Anna Komnene gives us a physical description of Guiscard: (Note: However, one should not trust this description, as the Byzantine princess was born in 1083 and Robert died in 1085. It is possible that Anna was inspired by a Norman mercenary or by Bohemond, son of Robert))

This Robert was Norman by birth, of obscure origins, with an overbearing character and a thoroughly villainous mind; he was a brave fighter, very cunning in his assaults on the wealth and power of great men; in achieving his aims absolutely inexorable, diverting criticism by incontrovertible argument. He was a man of immense stature, surpassing even the biggest men; he had a ruddy complexion, fair hair, broad shoulders, eyes that all but shot out sparks of fire. In a well-built man one looks for breadth here and slimness there; in him all was admirably well-proportioned and elegant... Homer remarked of Achilles that when he shouted his hearers had the impression of a multitude in uproar, but Robert's bellow, so they say, put tens of thousands to flight.

When Robert arrived in Apulia, lands were scarce, and thus he couldn't expect any land grant from his brother Drogo, then count (especially since Drogo had already given Humphrey the county of Lavello). In 1048, Guiscard joined Pandulf IV of Capua in a war against Guaimar IV of Salerno. The next year, however, he left the war. Chronicler Amatus of Montecassino says this was due to Pandulf denying a previous promise that he had made to Robert, which included the gift of a castle and his daughter's hand in marriage. Robert therefore returned to Drogo's court, and he asked his brother to grant him a fief. Drogo, who had just finished a military campaign in Calabria, granted him command of the fortress of Scribla, but Guiscard, dissatisfied, transferred to the castle of San Marco Argentano. During his time in Calabria, Robert married Alberada of Buonalbergo, under the promise of her nephew Girard of Buonalbergo that he would join Robert with his 200 knights if the marriage took place.

As the Normans gained more and more power in southern Italy, the Lombards, of whom they had been allies for a long time, turned against him. Pope Leo IX formed an anti-Norman coalition in an effort to expel them from the peninsula, but in 1053 he was defeated in the Battle of Civitate by the Norman forces, led by Humphrey, now count. Robert fought personally in the battle, and according to William of Apulia he was dismounted from his horse on three occasions, but he remounted every time.

== Rule ==
=== Accession to the throne and treaty of Melfi ===
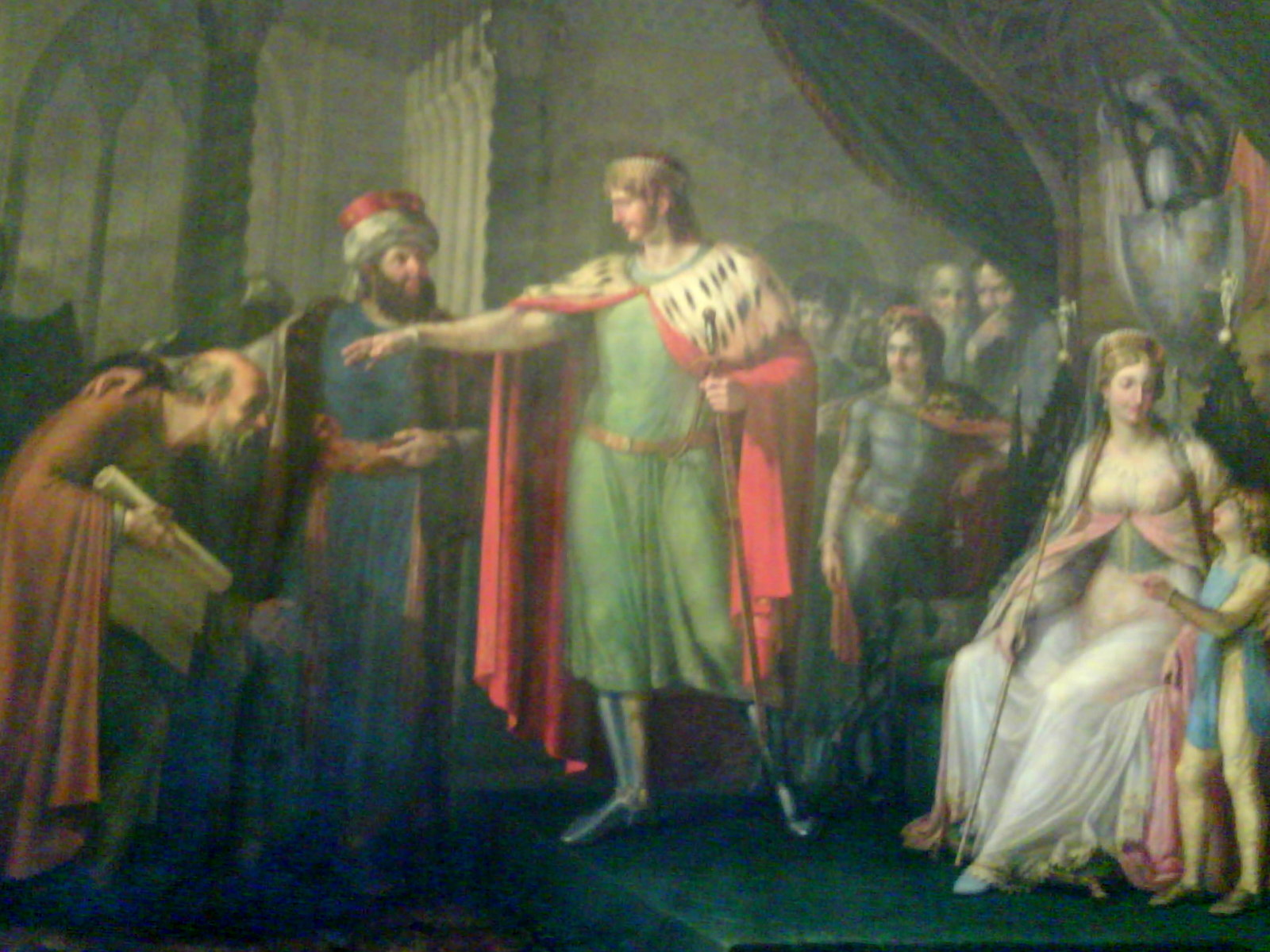
Robert Guiscard and Sikelgaita welcoming Constantine the African to court

When Humphrey died in 1057, Guiscard succeeded him as Count of Apulia and Calabria, skipping over his elder half-brother Geoffrey in the line of succession. Soon after, probably in 1058, Guiscard's marriage to Alberada was annulled due to consanguinity. It was the first time that a marriage was annulled for this cause. After that, Robert married Sikelgaita, sister of Gisulf II of Salerno, securing a new alliance between Lombards and Normans. In return for his sister's hand in marriage, Gisulf demanded that Guiscard destroyed two castles which belonged to his brother William, because they stood on Gisulf's territory.

The Papacy, in a conflict with the Holy Roman Emperor due to the Investiture Controversy, now opted to secure the Normans as allies. Therefore, in the Treaty of Melfi of 1059, Guiscard swore fealty to Pope Nicholas II. In return, Nicholas invested Guiscard of the titles of Duke of Apulia and Calabria and Lord of Sicily (by the Grace of God and St Peter duke of Apulia and Calabria and, if either aid me, future lord of Sicily), legitimizing his intervention against the Sicilian emirates, of Muslim faith.

=== Campaigns in Calabria ===
After the treaty of Melfi, Robert engaged in a large series of conquests in southern Italy, mainly in Calabria and Sicily, with the help of his younger brother Roger I. At the time of treaty, Guiscard was already leading an army in Calabria, in an attempt to fully subjugate the province, still partially held by the Byzantines. After being invested of his titles, Guiscard returned to Calabria, where his army was besieging Cariati. Upon his arrival Cariati submitted, and, before winter, Rossano and Gerace followed. He briefly returned to Apulia to remove the Byzantine garrisons from Taranto and Brindisi, before returning once again in Calabria, where after a long and arduous siege, he conquered Reggio. Finally, he took Scilla, an island to which the Reggian garrison had fled. The complete control over Calabria opened the way to his planned conquest of Sicily.

=== Conquest of Sicily ===
Norman progress in Sicily during Robert's expeditions to the Balkans: Capua, Apulia and Calabria, and the County of Sicily are Norman. The Emirate of Sicily, the Duchy of Naples and lands in the Abruzzo (in the southern Duchy of Spoleto) are not yet conquered.

Robert's brother, Roger, had initially led a tiny force to attack Messina, but he was easily repulsed by the Saracen garrison. After that, Guiscard was once again forced to return to Apulia, under the threat of Byzantine emperor Constantine X's army, which in January 1061 had begun besieging Melfi itself. The full weight of Guiscard's army forced the Byzantines to retreat, and by May Apulia was free again.

Robert and Roger returned to Sicily, where in 1061 they took Messina by surprise with comparable ease. After fortifying the city, Guiscard allied himself with the emir of Syracuse, Ibn al-Timnah, against the emir of Castrogiovanni, Ibn al-Hawwas. The forces of Robert, Roger and their Muslim ally marched into central Sicily through Rometta, conquering Paternò. They then tried to besiege Castrogiovanni, failing to conquer the fort. In 1063 Robert left for Apulia to spend Christmas with Sikelgaita, leaving behind the fort of San Marco d'Alunzio (which he had named after San Marco Argentano, his castle in Calabria). In 1064 he returned to Sicily, bypassing Castrogiovanni and going straight for Palermo. His campsite was however infested with tarantulas, and the expedition was abandoned.

In 1071, the Norman County of Sicily was created and given to Roger. A year later Palermo finally fell, and the rest of Sicily was gradually conquered. A last resistance was held by Benavert, emir of Syracuse, but he was ultimately defeated in 1086. The last Muslim holding in Sicily, Noto, fell in 1091. As a result of his Sicilian campaigns, Robert Guiscard is also referred to as "Black Shirt Robert" because throughout the campaign he wore elegant black clothing.

=== Conquests of Bari, Salerno and Benevento ===
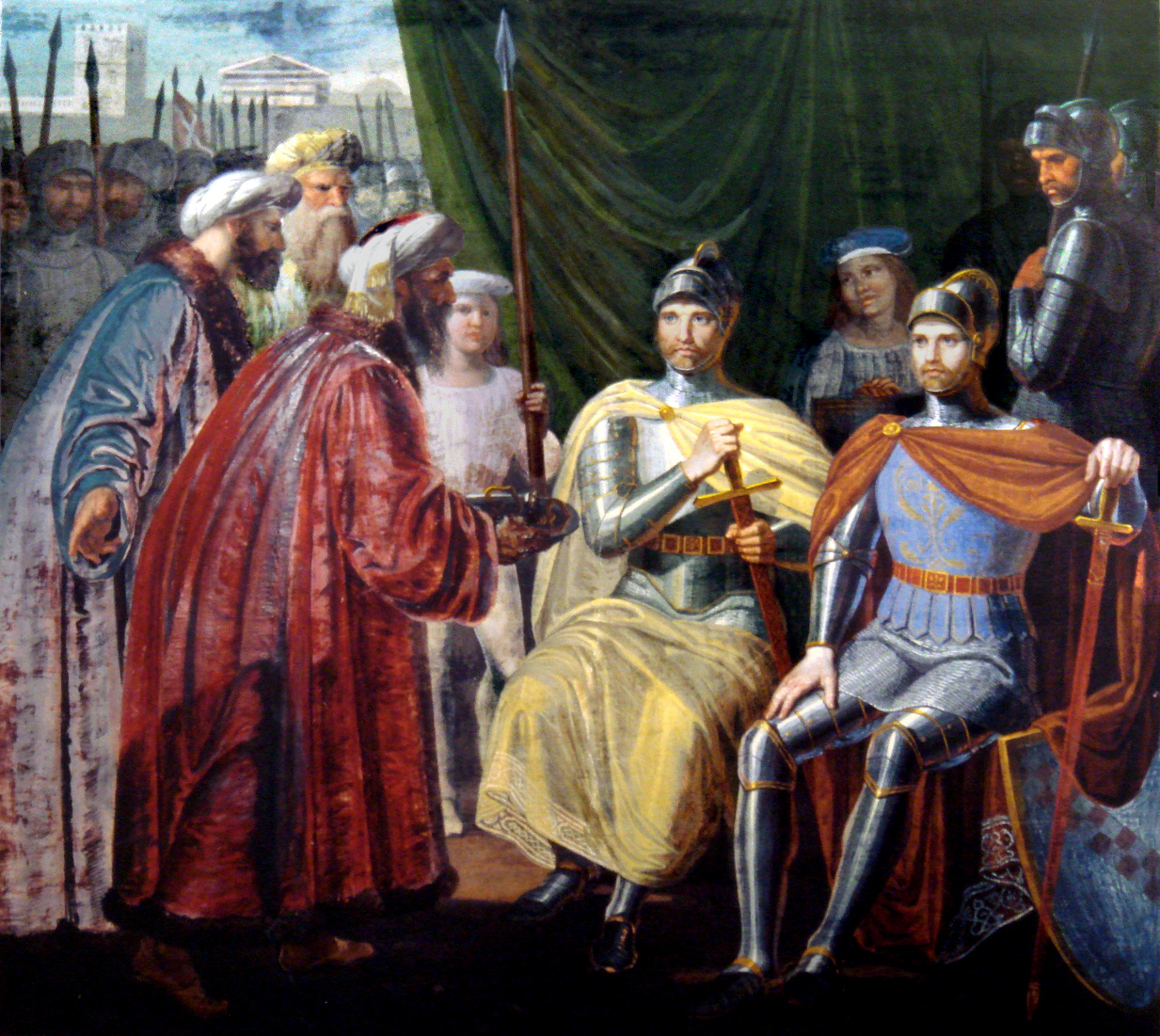
The surrender of Palermo by the Muslims, Giuseppe Patania, Palazzo dei Normanni

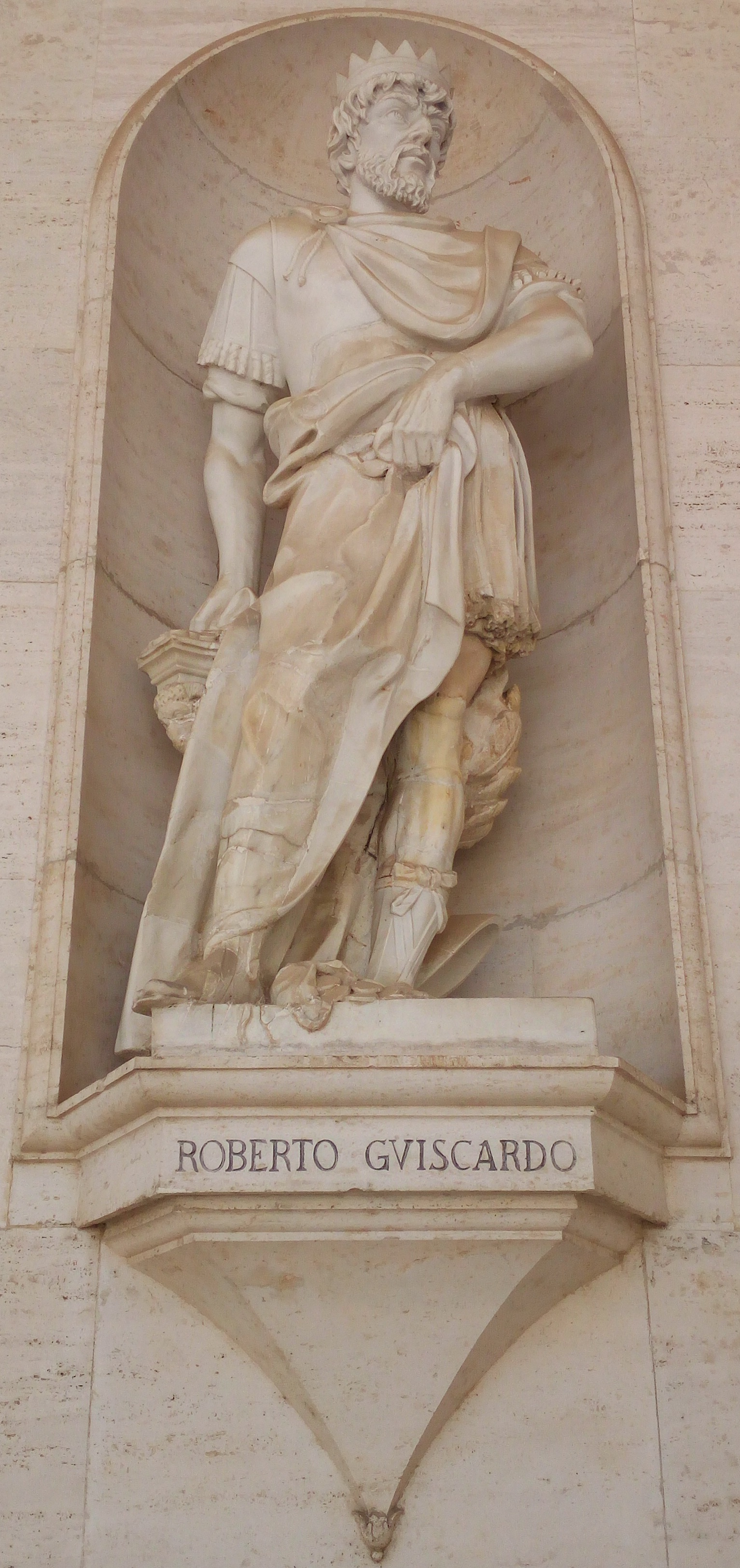
Statue of Robert Guiscard, 1700–1749, Lorenzo Ottoni.

While the Conquest of Sicily was still in progress, Robert had to fight once again with the Byzantines. The Byzantine forces had occupied Bari, on request of Robert's nephew Abelard of Hauteville, who wanted to claim the throne for himself. Guiscard besieged the city by land and water for four years, until in 1071 the people decided to surrender; he would later repair the damages done by the siege. The Byzantines were finally chased off the Italian peninsula, and Robert now focused his attention on the various Lombard independent realms in southern Italy.

Robert firstly attacked the Principality of Salerno, held by his brother in law Gisulf II. Salerno was besieged and fell in December 1076, and Gisulf abandoned his castle with his court in May 1077. Robert then took the principality of Benevento in 1078. Pope Gregory VII was alarmed, as Benevento was considered possession of the papal state. Nevertheless, he decided not to enter a conflict with the Normans, as he was already busy with Emperor Henry IV due to the investiture controversy. Simon de Crépy negotiated an alliance with Guiscard on behalf of Gregory VII, and in June 1080 the Pope gave Guiscard claims on Abruzzi, Salerno, Amalfi, and on the March of Fermo. Robert would later return Benevento to the papacy in 1081.

=== Against the Byzantines ===
In his last campaign, Guiscard attacked the Byzantine Empire itself, supporting the cause of Raiktor, a monk who claimed to be deposed emperor Michael VII. Even after it was clear that Raiktor was lying, Robert didn't stop, believing that he himself had the right to rule the Byzantine Empire since Constantine Doukas, son of the real Michael VII, had once been proposed to his daughter Olympias.

In May 1081, Robert sailed with an army of Norman and Lombard troops (1,300 knights according to Geoffrey Malaterra, up to 10,000 troops according to Orderic Vitalis). In October 1081, he defeated Alexios I Komnenos in the Battle of Dyrrachium, and by 1082 he had occupied Corfu and Durazzo. In 1083, however, he was forced to return to Italy to help Pope Gregory VII, who was being besieged in Castel Sant'Angelo by Henry IV. In May 1084 Guiscard entered Rome, and forced Henry to retreat. A revolt of the citizens led to a three-day sack of the city, after which Robert escorted the Pope out of the city. Guiscard's son Bohemond, who had remained in the Balkans, had by this time lost his father's conquests. Robert returned to the Balkans and reoccupied Corfu and Cephalonia, with the help of Ragusa and other dalmatian cities under the rule of king Demetrius Zvonimir.

=== Death ===
On 17 July 1085, Guiscard died of a fever in Cephalonia, at Atheras, north of Lixouri. His remains were brought back to Italy, and he was buried in the Hauteville family mausoleum, the Abbey of Santissima Trinità in Venosa. The town of Fiskardo in Cephalonia is named after him. On his epigraph there are four Latin verses; the last one reads "Hic terror mundi Guiscardus", which is translated as: "Here (lies) Guiscard, terror of the world".

== Succession ==
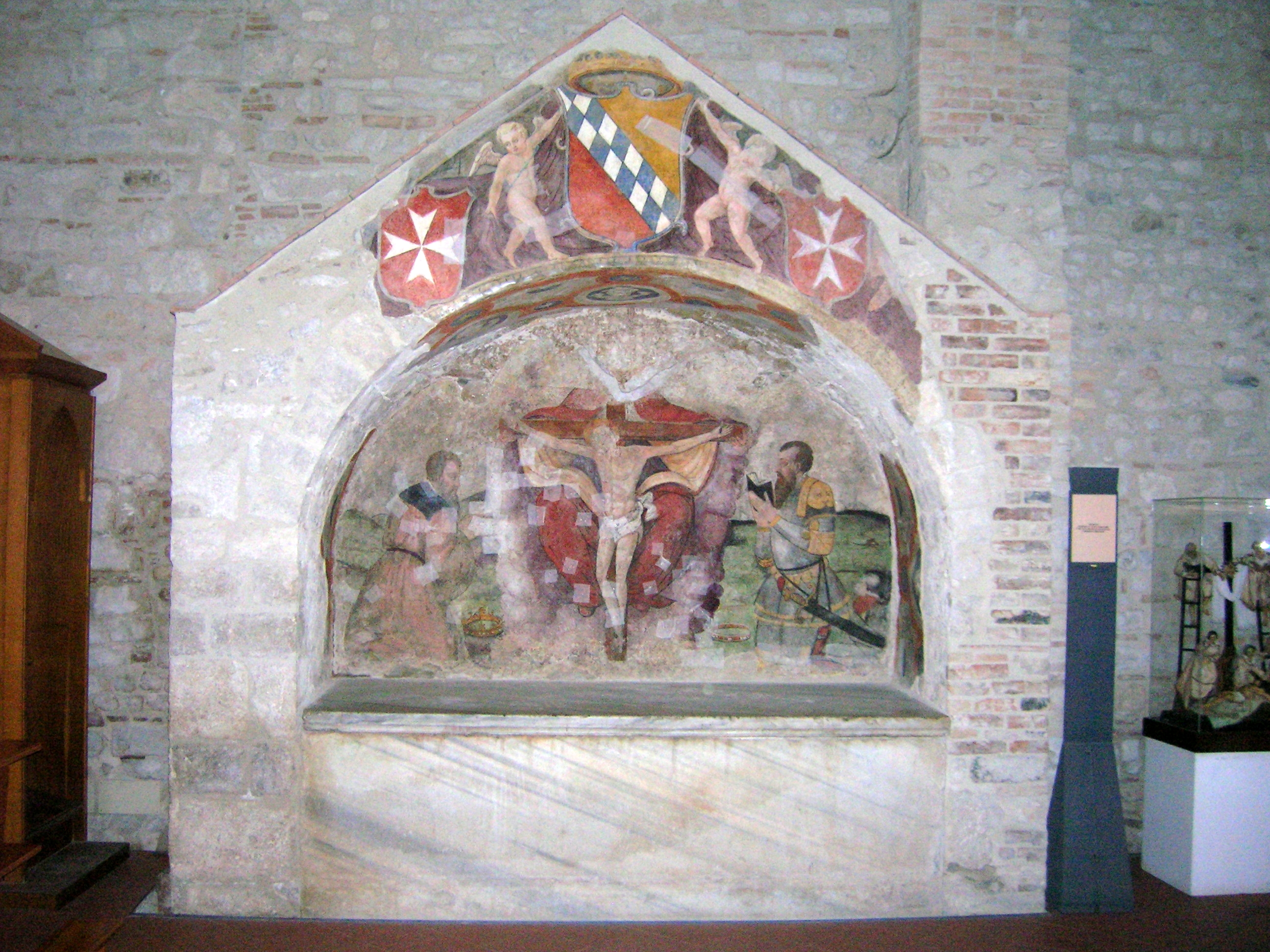
Hauteville family mausoleum, where Robert Guiscard was buried. Trinity Abbey in Venosa, Italy.

Robert's oldest son, Bohemond, became illegitimate, that is, legally a bastard, when Robert and Alberada's marriage was annulled due to consanguinity. Thus, he was succeeded as Duke of Apulia and Calabria by his eldest son by Sikelgaita, Roger Borsa. Bohemond was initially supposed to inherit Robert's conquests in the Balkans, but this didn't happen as they were soon re-conquered by the Byzantines. He instead got some land around the city of Taranto. Bohemond would later become one of the leaders of the first crusade and the first prince of Antioch. Guiscard's other sons, Guy and Robert Scalio, never claimed any title for themselves.

The descendants of Robert's brother, Roger I, Count of Sicily, would later create the Kingdom of Sicily.

== Religion ==
Guiscard's conquest of Calabria and Sicily was instrumental in bringing Latin Christianity to an area that had historically followed the Byzantine rite. Guiscard laid the foundation of the Salerno Cathedral and of a Norman monastery at Sant'Eufemia Lamezia in Calabria. This latter monastery, famous for its choir, began as a community of eleven monks from Saint-Evroul in Normandy under the abbot Robert de Grantmesnil.

Although relations with the papacy were initially unstable, Guiscard preferred good relations and made a gesture by abandoning his first wife in accordance with church law. While the popes were fearful of Guisard's growing power, they preferred the strong and independent hand of a Catholic Norman to the rule of a Byzantine Greek. Guiscard received his investment with Sicily at the hands of Pope Nicholas II, who had a greater fear of the Holy Roman Emperor to the Papal reforms. Guiscard supported the reforms, coming to the rescue of a besieged Pope Gregory VII, who had once excommunicated him for encroaching on the territory of the Papal States. The polarized religious atmosphere after the Great Schism of 1054 strengthened Guiscard's alliance with papal forces. creating a formidable papal-Norman opposition to the Eastern Empire.

== Marriage and issue ==
Guiscard's first wife was Alberada of Buonalbergo, whom he married in 1051. They had two children:

- Bohemond I, prince of Antioch.
- Emma, married Odo the Good Marquis (Note: Lock indicates Emma as a daughter of Sigelgaita.)

Guiscard and Alberada's marriage was later annulled, and in 1058 or 1059 he remarried to Sichelgaita. They had ten children:

- Matilda, married to Count Ramon Berenguer II of Barcelona.
- Roger Borsa, Duke of Apulia and Calabria.
- Mabel, married to William de Grandmesnil.
- A daughter (maybe named Héria), married to Count Hugh V of Maine. (Note: Barton states that a "daughter" of Robert Guiscard married Hugh V of Maine.)
- Robert Scalio
- Guy
- Sibylla, married to Count Ebles II of Roucy.
- Olympias (renamed Helena), betrothed to Constantine Doukas.
- Cecile
- Gaitelgrima, married to Humphrey, Count of Sarno.

== Depictions ==
In the Divine Comedy, Dante sees Guiscard's spirit in the Heaven of Mars, along with other "warriors of the faith" who exemplify the cardinal virtue of fortitude. In the Inferno, Dante describes Guiscard's enemies as a field of mutilated shades stretching out to the horizon.

Guiscard was the protagonist of Kleist's verse drama Robert Guiskard, incomplete at the author's death (1811).

In the video game Crusader Kings III, Robert Guiscard, portrayed as the Duke of Apulia, is a recommended starting character. He starts with his own epithet, Robert "the Fox".

== Sources ==
- Von Kleist, Heinrich Robert Guiskard, Herzog der Normänner, student edition (Stuttgart, 2011).
- Chalandon, F. Histoire de la domination normande en Italie et en Sicile. (Paris, 1907).
- Von Heinemann, L. Geschichte der Normannen in Unteritalien (Leipzig, 1894).
- Norwich, John Julius. The Normans in the South 1016–1130. Longmans: London, 1967.
- Chaplin, Danny. "Strenuitas: The Life and Times of Robert Guiscard and Bohemond of Taranto. Norman Power from the Mezzogiorno to Antioch, 1016–1111 AD" (Singapore, 2015).
- Forbes, Charles (1879). The Monks of the West from St. Benedict to St. Bernard: Vol. 6. London: William Blackwood and Sons.
- Rogers, Clifford J. (2010). The Oxford Encyclopedia of Medieval Warfare and Military Technology: Vol. 1. Oxford: Oxford University Press. ISBN 978-0195334036.
- Lock, Peter (2006). The Routledge Companion to the Crusades. Routledge.
- Loud, Graham A. (2000). The Age of Robert Guiscard: Southern Italy and the Norman Conquest. Routledge.
- Heygate, Catherine (2016). "Marriage strategies among the Normans of Southern Italy in the Eleventh Century". In Stringer, Keith J.; Jotischky, Andrew (eds.). Norman Expansion: Connections, Continuities and Contrasts. Routledge. pp. 165–186.
- Barton, Richard Ewing (2004). Lordship in the County of Maine, C. 890–1160. The Boydell Press.
- Johns, Jeremy (2015). "Arabic Inscriptions in the Capella Palatina: Performativity, Audience, Legibility and Illegibility". In Eastmond, Antony (ed.). Viewing Inscriptions in the Late Antique and Medieval World. Cambridge University Press.

Robert Guiscard Hauteville family Born: c. 1015 Died: 17 July 1085
Preceded by Humphrey	Duke of Apulia and Calabria; 1057–1085	Succeeded by Roger Borsa
