= William II of Apulia =

Duke of Apulia and Calabria from 1111 to 1127

William II (1095 – July 1127) was the Duke of Apulia and Calabria from 1111 to 1127. He was the son and successor of Roger Borsa. His mother, Adela of Flanders, had previously been queen of Denmark, and he was a half-brother of Charles the Good.

He succeeded his father as duke in 1111, though Adela served as regent until William was of age. Like his father, he proved utterly inept at governing his Italian possessions. He could not avoid conflict with his first cousin once removed Roger II of Sicily, and in 1121 Pope Calixtus II personally intervened to make peace between the warring cousins. William and Roger came to an agreement, whereby Roger provided knights and a sum of gold to help William seize the county of one of his major vassals Jordan of Ariano, and in exchange, William abandoned his Sicilian and Calabrian lands.

In 1114, William married a daughter of Count Robert of Carazzo, but they had no children. He died without legitimate posterity in July 1127, leaving the entire of the Norman Mezzogiorno to be seized by his first cousin once removed, Roger II of Sicily, his erstwhile ally.

According to the Fragmentary Troia Chronicle, William journeyed to the capital of the Byzantine Empire in 1116, but this is implausible.

Considered an insignificant ruler by dated historiography, William was respected by his contemporaries, popular with his barons and subjects, and praised for his martial prowess.

== Sources ==
- Houben, Hubert (2002). Roger II of Sicily: A Ruler Between East and West. Cambridge University Press.
- Matthew, Donald (1992). The Norman Kingdom of Sicily. Cambridge University Press.
- Oldfield, Paul (2021). "The Troia Chronicle and Historiographical Production in Medieval Puglia". Papers of the British School at Rome. FirstView. 90: 1–25. doi:10.1017/S0068246221000234. S2CID 243824617.

Italian royalty
Preceded by Roger Borsa	Duke of Apulia and Calabria; 1111–1127	Succeeded by Roger II
