= Hauteville-la-Guichard =

- Commune
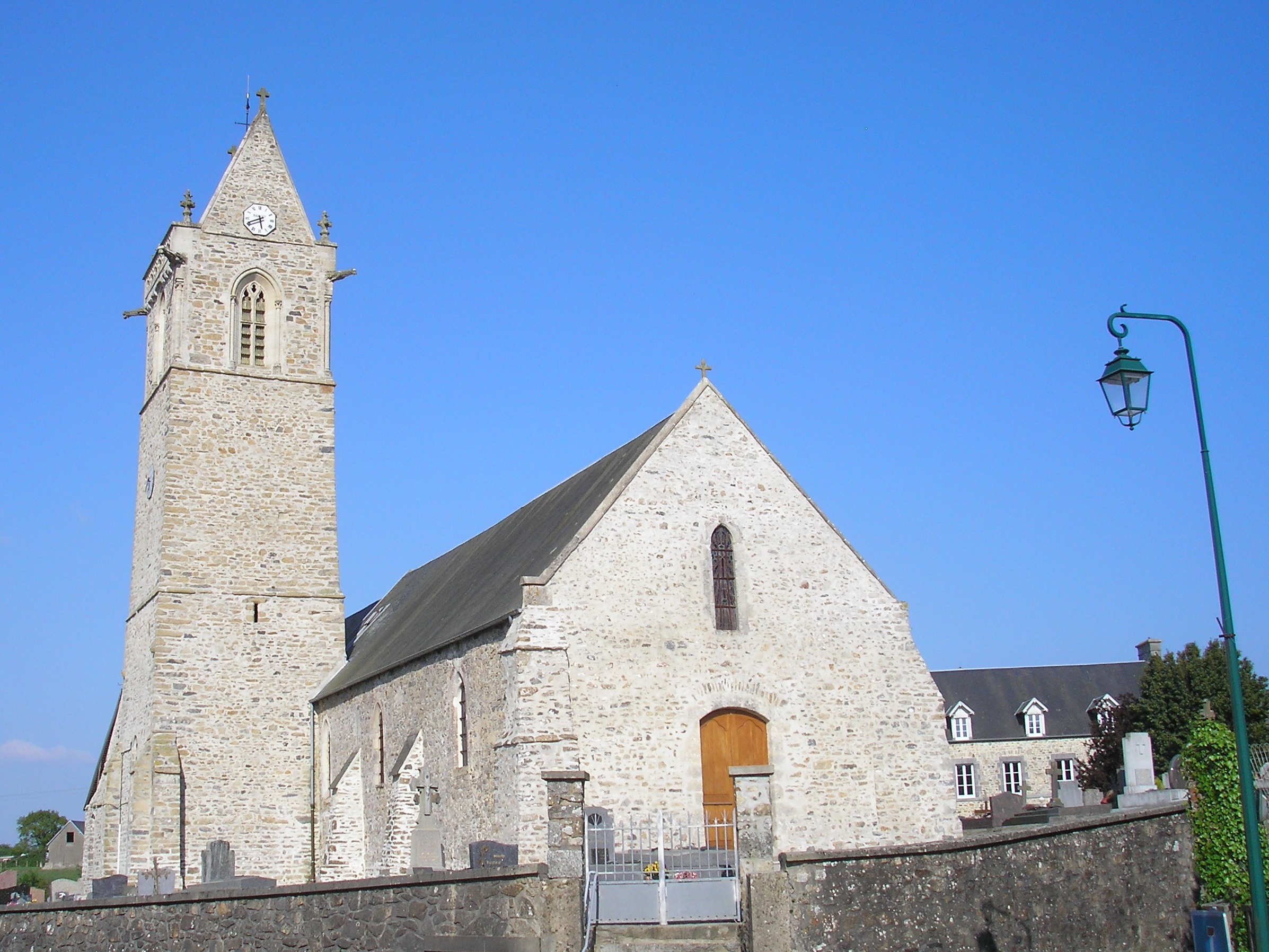
- The church of Notre-Dame-de-l'Assomption
- Location of Hauteville-la-Guichard
- Location within France Location within Normandy
- Coordinates: 49°07′38″N 1°18′02″W
- Country: France
- Region: Normandy
- Department: Manche
- Arrondissement: Coutances
- Canton: Agon-Coutainville

Government
  - Mayor (2025–2026): Jean-Louis Lesaulnier
- Area^{1}: 11.98 km^{2} (4.63 sq mi)
- Elevation: 75 m (246 ft)
- Highest elevation: 111 m (364 ft)
- Lowest elevation: 11 m (36 ft)
- Population (2023): 440
  - Density: 37/km^{2} (95/sq mi)
- Time zone: UTC+01:00 (CET)
  - Summer (DST): UTC+02:00 (CEST)
- INSEE/Postal code: 50232 /50570
- ^{1} French Land Register data, which excludes lakes, ponds, glaciers > 1 km^{2} (0.386 sq mi or 247 acres) and river estuaries.

Hauteville-la-Guichard (French pronunciation: [otvil la ɡiʃaʁ]) is small village and commune in the Manche department in Normandy in north-western France. Its population is about 450 (2022).

It is thought to be the original stronghold of the Hauteville family who made their fortunes in southern Italy and Sicily as the Norman kings of Sicily, beginning with the modest Norman seigneur Tancred of Hauteville, who is commemorated by a simple exhibit housed in the former presbytère.

== Origins ==
From just which village of Hauteville the family drew its name is hard to identify with certainty, though modern scholarship favours Hauteville-la-Guichard.

== See also ==
- Communes of the Manche department
