= County of Apulia and Calabria =

Norman state in southern Italy and Sicily from 1043 to 1130

County of Apulia and Calabria Comitatus Apuliae et Calabriae (Latin) Duchy of Apulia and Calabria Ducatus Apuliae et Calabriae
- 1043–1130
- Motto: Servire Nescit (Latin)
- The Duchy (in green) in the political context of Italy and the Balkans in 1084.
- Status: Vassal state of the Papacy
- Capital: Melfi (1043–1077); Salerno (1077–1130)
- Common languages: Old Norman; Italian; Neapolitan; Calabrian/Salentino; Latin; Greek
- Religion: Roman Catholicism; Greek Orthodoxy
- Demonyms: Normans (generally), Lombards, Apulians, Calabrians
- Government: Feudal monarchy
- Count/Duke
  - 1043–1046: William I
  - 1059–1085: Robert I
  - 1085–1111: Roger Borsa
  - 1111–1127: William II
- Historical era: Middle Ages
  - Lombard lords elect William of Hauteville as Count: 1043
  - Emperor Henry III recognizes the County: 1047
  - Battle of Civitate; Pope Leo IX recognizes the County: 1053
  - Treaty of Melfi; the County becomes a Duchy: 1059
  - Norman conquest of Salerno: 1076
  - Death of the childless William II: 1127
  - Coronation of Roger; Duchy annexed to Sicily: 1130
- Currency: Follis (common)
Preceded by
Catepanate of Italy
Principality of Salerno
Duchy of Benevento
Emirate of Sicily
Succeeded by
Kingdom of Sicily
Principality of Taranto
- Today part of: Italy

The County of Apulia and Calabria (Latin: Comitatus Apuliae et Calabriae), later the Duchy of Apulia and Calabria (Latin: Ducatus Apuliae et Calabriae), was a Norman vassal state of the Papacy founded by William of Hauteville in 1043, composed of the territories of Gargano, Capitanata, Apulia, Vulture, and most of Campania. It became a duchy when Robert Guiscard was raised to the rank of duke by Pope Nicholas II in 1059.

The duchy was disestablished in 1130, when the last duke of Apulia and Calabria, Roger II, became King of Sicily. The title of duke was thereafter used intermittently as a title for the heir apparent to the Kingdom of Sicily.

== Creation ==
William I of Hauteville returned to Melfi in September 1042 and was recognized by all the Normans as supreme leader. He turned to Guaimar IV, Prince of Salerno, and Rainulf Drengot, Count of Aversa, and offered both an alliance. With the unification of the Norman families of Altavilla and Drengot, Guaimar gave official recognition to the Norman conquests. At the end of the year and extending into 1043, William and Rainulf met in an assembly at Melfi with the Norman barons and the Lombards.

In the meeting, Guaimar IV of Salerno ensured the Hauteville dominance over Melfi. William of Hauteville formed the second core of his possessions and differentiated himself from Rainulf I of Aversa, head of the territories of Campania. All the barons present offered a tribute as a vassal to Guaimar, which recognized William I of Hauteville as the first to receive the title of Count of Apulia. To tie it to himself, he offered to marry Guaimar's niece Guide, daughter of Guy, Duke of Sorrento. Guaimar reconfirmed the title of count to Rainulf as well, which created the County of Puglia.

In 1047, Drogo of Hauteville was made "count" of Apulia and Calabria by Emperor Henry III, with territories lost by Guaimar IV of the Principality of Salerno.

== Duchy of Apulia and Calabria ==
The Duchy of Apulia and Calabria within Southern Italy in 1112

In 1043, the prince of Salerno, Guaimar IV, had been acclaimed Duke of Apulia and Calabria although the legitimacy of this title (as it was not officially recognized by any universal power) could be considered juridically doubtful; in fact, in 1047, the emperor Henry III intervened to claim the ducal title.

However, after 1059, the county was officially named Ducato di Puglia e Calabria ("Duchy of Apulia and Calabria"), because Robert Guiscard was named a "duke" by Pope Nicholas II.

Salerno was conquered in 1077 by the Normans, and these territories were added to the Duchy of Apulia and Calabria and with this conquest, the Normans controlled all of continental southern Italy, with the exception of the small Duchy of Naples. The next year, the capital was moved from Melfi to Salerno, and the Normans began to focus on completing the conquest of Sicily. They gradually created, until 1091, the precursor of the Kingdom of Sicily, the first unified state in southern Italy that was founded in 1130.

Salerno remained the capital of this southern Italian political entity for half a century (from 1078 to 1130), the city flourished with the Schola Medica Salernitana, the first medical school in Europe.

== List of counts and dukes ==
=== Dukes of Calabria ===
Name	Portrait	Birth	Reign		Marriage	Notes
Name	Portrait	Birth	Start	End	Marriage	Notes
Azzo of Spoleto		?	969	circa 983	?	Of Langobard origins, he was named Duke by Otto the Great. He disappeared under dubious circumstances, at the time in which Byzantines recaptured Calabria.
Melus of Bari		circa 970	1015	1020	Maralda; 1 son	Of Langobard origins, but of Greek culture, he rebelled against the byzantines. Emperor Henry II gave him the title of Duke.
Guaimar		circa 1013	1043	1047	Gemma of Capua; 1 son, 3 daughters	He was the first son of Guaimar III of Salerno and Gaitelgrima of Benevento. In 1042–43 at Melfi, by approving the election of William of Hauteville as Count of Apulia, he obtained the Duchy of Apulia and Calabria.

=== Counts of Apulia and Calabria ===
William I is usually considered the first count of Apulia and Calabria, but he was never recognized as such by the emperor. In 1047, Holy Roman Emperor Henry III took away Guaimar's ducal title. He christened William's successor (and brother) Drogo Dux et Magister Italiae comesque Normannorum totius Apuliae et Calabriae (Duke and Master of Italy and Count of the Normans of all Apulia and Calabria) and made him a direct vassal of the empire.

- William I Iron Arm 1043–1046
- Drogo 1046–1051
- Humphrey 1051–1057
- Robert Guiscard 1057–1059

=== Dukes of Apulia and Calabria ===
- Robert Guiscard 1059–1085
- Roger I Borsa 1085–1111
- William II 1111–1127

In 1127 the duchy passed to the count of Sicily. It was thereafter used intermittently as a title for the heir apparent.

- Roger II 1127–1134, also king of Sicily (1130–1154)
- Roger III 1134–1148, son of the previous, opposed by
  - Ranulf 1137–1139, candidate of Pope Innocent II and Lothair II, Holy Roman Emperor
- William III 1148–1154, also king of Sicily (1154–1166)
- Roger IV 1154–1161, son of the previous

The title was left vacant after the death of Roger IV. It may have been revived for a short-lived son of William II:

- Bohemond 1181

It was revived by King Tancred for his eldest son in 1189:

- Roger V 1189–1193
