= Norman conquest of southern Italy =

Historical event in the European Middle Ages

- The Norman Kingdom of Sicily (in green) in 1154, upon the death of Roger II
Date	999–1198
Location	Southern Italy, North Africa
Result	Norman Victory
Territorial changes	Norman conquest of Apulia, Calabria, Sicily, Campania, Malta, and the rest of Southern Italy, partial conquest of Africa

Belligerents
Kalbid Sicily; Zirid Empire; Almohad Caliphate; Holy Roman Empire; Byzantine Empire; Republic of Venice Duchy of Naples Duchy of Gaeta Duchy of Amalfi Catepanate of Italy: Papal States; Principality of Salerno Principality of Capua	Normans; Hauteville family Apulia and Calabria County of Sicily Kingdom of Sicily Kingdom of Africa

Commanders and leaders
Michael Dokeianos; Harald Hardrada; Basil Boioannes; Manuel I Komnenos; Michael Palaiologos Doukas; John Doukas; Henry IV; Gerard of Lorraine; Rudolf of Benevento; Pope Leo IX; Lando IV of Capua; Robert III of Loritello; Ranulf II of Alife; Pope Honorius II; Robert II of Capua	Melus of Bari; William Iron Arm; Rainulf Drengot; Humphrey of Hauteville; Drogo of Hauteville; Robert Guiscard; Richard I of Capua; Roger I of Sicily; Bohemond of Taranto; Roussel de Bailleul; Roger Borsa; Roger II of Sicily; Richard II of Capua; Sergius VII of Naples; William I of Sicily

The Norman conquest of southern Italy lasted from 999 to 1194, involving many battles and independent conquerors. In 1130, the territories in southern Italy united as the Kingdom of Sicily, which included the island of Sicily, the southern third of the Italian Peninsula (including Benevento, which was briefly held twice), the archipelago of Malta, and parts of North Africa.

Itinerant Norman forces arrived in southern Italy as mercenaries in the service of Lombard and Byzantine factions, communicating swiftly back home news about opportunities in the Mediterranean. These groups gathered in several places, establishing fiefdoms and states of their own, uniting and elevating their status to de facto independence within 50 years of their arrival.

Unlike the Norman Conquest of England (1066), which took a few years after one decisive battle, the conquest of southern Italy was the product of decades and a number of battles, few decisive. Many territories were conquered independently, and only later were unified into a single state. Compared to the conquest of England, it was unplanned and disorganised, but equally complete. On the mainland, however, later unification did not erase the political importance of counties, lordships, and negotiated aristocratic relationships, which remained central to military and territorial administration in the twelfth-century kingdom.

== Pre-Norman Viking activity in Italy ==
There is little evidence of Viking activity in Italy as a precursor to the arrival of the Normans in 999, but some raiding is recorded. Ermentar of Noirmoutier, the Annales Bertiniani, and several additional Arabic sources provide accounts of Vikings based in Francia, raiding in Iberia, then proceeding to raid in other parts of the Mediterranean around 860. In 860, according to an account by the Norman monk Dudo of Saint-Quentin, a Viking fleet co-commanded by Alstignus, believed to be Hastein, and Björn Ironside, landed in Italy seeking to sack the city of Rome. The Viking force arrived at the town of Luna, whose walls were too heavily defended for an outright assault. The force devised a plan to trick the town's bishop into converting Hastein to Christianity. Once converted, Hastein faked his death with the final wish to be buried in the town's church. Entering with a small force with concealed weapons in the funeral procession, the force surprised the town guards and opened the city gates for the remaining Viking force. Upon learning that the town was not Rome, the Viking force raided the surrounding countryside before ultimately sailing back to Frankia.

Many Norse fought as mercenaries in southern Italy, including the Varangian Guard led by Harald Hardrada (later crowned king of Norway), who conquered Sicily between 1038 and 1040. He had the assistance of Norman mercenaries led by William Iron Arm, who won his nickname by defeating Benavert, the last emir of Muslim-ruled Syracuse in single combat, and a Lombard contingent, led by Arduin. The Varangians were first used as mercenaries in Italy against the Arabs in 936. The Italy runestones were raised in Sweden in memory of warriors who died in Langbarðaland (Longobardia), the Old Norse name for southern Italy.

Later, several Anglo-Danish and Norwegian nobles participated in the Norman conquest of southern Italy, like Edgar Ætheling, the West Saxon who left the Kingdom of England in 1086, and Jarl Erling Skakke, who won his nickname (Skakke 'bent head') after a battle against Muslims in Sicily.

On the other hand, many Anglo-Danish rebels fleeing William the Conqueror joined the Byzantines in their struggle against Robert Guiscard, duke of Apulia in southern Italy.

== Arrival of the Normans in Italy ==
The earliest reported date of the arrival of Norman knights in southern Italy is 999, although it may be assumed that they had visited before then. In that year, according to some traditional sources of uncertain origin, Norman pilgrims returning from the Church of the Holy Sepulchre in Jerusalem via Apulia stayed with Guaimar III of Salerno. The city and its environs were attacked by North African Muslims demanding payment of an overdue annual tribute. While Guaimar began to collect the tribute, the Normans ridiculed him and his Lombard subjects for cowardice, and they assaulted their besiegers, who fled. Booty was confiscated, and a grateful Guaimar asked the Normans to stay. They refused, but promised to bring his rich gifts to their compatriots in Normandy and tell them about possibly lucrative military service in Salerno. Some sources have Guaimar sending emissaries to Normandy to bring back knights, and this account of the arrival of the Normans is sometimes known as the "Salerno (or Salernitan) tradition".

The Salerno tradition was first recorded by Amatus of Montecassino in his Ystoire de li Normant between 1071 and 1086. Much of this information was borrowed from Amatus by Peter the Deacon for his continuation of the Chronicon Monasterii Casinensis of Leo of Ostia, written during the early 12th century. Beginning with the Annales Ecclesiastici of Baronius in the 17th century, the Salernitan story became the accepted history. Although its factual accuracy was questioned periodically during the following centuries, it has been accepted (with some modifications) by most scholars since.

Another historical account of the arrival of the first Normans in Italy, the "Gargano tradition", appears in primary chronicles without reference to any previous Norman presence. According to this account Norman pilgrims at the shrine to Michael the Archangel at Monte Gargano in 1016 met the Lombard Melus of Bari, who persuaded them to join him in an attack on the Byzantine government of Apulia.

Map of Italy at the arrival of the Normans, who eventually conquered Sicily and all the territory on the mainland south of the Holy Roman Empire (the bold line), as well as the southern regions of the Papal States and the Duchy of Spoleto

As with the Salerno tradition, there are two primary sources for the Gargano story: the Gesta Roberti Wiscardi of William of Apulia (dated 1088–1110) and the Chronica monasterii S. Bartholomaei de Carpineto of a monk named Alexander, written about a century later and based on William's work. Some scholars have combined the Salerno and Gargano tales, and John Julius Norwich suggested that the meeting between Melus and the Normans had been arranged by Guaimar. Melus had been in Salerno just before his visit to Monte Gargano.

Another story involves the exile of a group of brothers from the Drengot family. One of the brothers, Osmund (according to Orderic Vitalis) or Gilbert (according to Amatus and Peter the Deacon), murdered William Repostel (Repostellus) in the presence of Robert I, Duke of Normandy after Repostel allegedly boasted about dishonouring his murderer's daughter. Threatened with death, the Drengot brother fled with his siblings to Rome and one of the brothers had an audience with the pope before joining Melus (Melo) of Bari. Amatus dates the story to after 1027, and does not mention the pope. According to him, Gilbert's brothers were Osmund, Ranulf, Asclettin and Ludolf (Rudolf, according to Peter). Between 1016 and 1024, in a fragmented political context, the Lombard County of Ariano was usurped by a group of Norman knights headed by Gilbert and hired by Melus. The county, which replaced the pre-existing chamberlainship, is considered to be the first political body established by the Normans in the South. Although the conquest itself was not directed from a single centre, later scholarship has drawn greater attention to the long afterlife of such mainland county formations within the political and aristocratic organisation of the kingdom.

Repostel's murder is dated by all the chronicles to the reign of Robert the Magnificent and after 1027, although some scholars believe "Robert" was a scribal error for "Richard" (Richard II of Normandy, who was duke in 1017). The earlier date is necessary if the emigration of the first Normans was connected to the Drengots and the murder of William Repostel. In the Histories of Ralph Glaber, "Rodulfus" leaves Normandy after displeasing Count Richard (Richard II). The sources disagree about which brother was the leader on the southern trip. Orderic and William of Jumièges, in the latter's Gesta Normannorum Ducum, name Osmund; Glaber names Rudolph, and Leo, Amatus and Adhemar of Chabannes name Gilbert. According to most southern-Italian sources, the leader of the Norman contingent at the Battle of Cannae in 1018 was Gilbert. If Rudolf is identified with the Rudolf of Amatus' history as a Drengot brother, he may have been the leader at Cannae.

A modern hypothesis concerning the Norman arrival in the Mezzogiorno concerns the chronicles of Glaber, Adhemar and Leo (not Peter's continuation). All three chronicles indicate that Normans (either a group of 40 or a much-larger force of around 250) under "Rodulfus" (Rudolf), fleeing Richard II, came to Pope Benedict VIII of Rome. The pope sent them to Salerno (or Capua) to seek mercenary employment against the Byzantines because of the latter's invasion of papal Beneventan territory.

== Lombard revolt, 1009–1022 ==
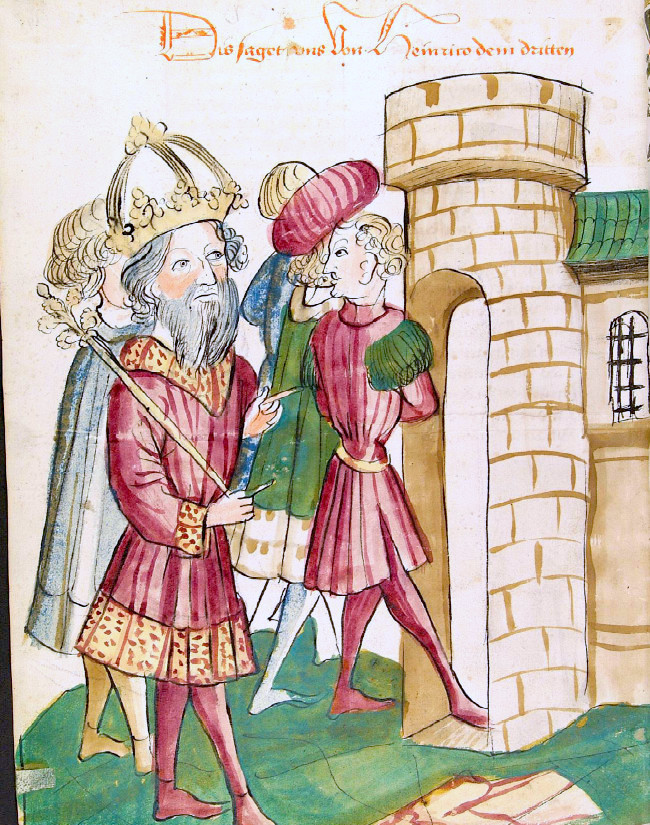
The imprisonment of Pandulf IV of Capua, after Emperor Henry II's 1022 campaign

On 9 May 1009, an insurrection erupted in Bari against the Catapanate of Italy, the regional Byzantine authority based there. Led by Melus, a local Lombard, the revolt quickly spread to other cities. Late that year (or early in 1010) the katepano, John Curcuas, was killed in battle. In March 1010 his successor, Basil Mesardonites, disembarked with reinforcements and besieged the rebels in the city. The Byzantine citizens negotiated with Basil and forced the Lombard leaders, Melus and his brother-in-law Dattus, to flee. Basil entered the city on 11 June 1011, reestablishing Byzantine authority. He did not follow his victory with severe sanctions, only sending Melus' family (including his son, Argyrus) to Constantinople. Basil died in 1016, after years of peace in southern Italy.

Leo Tornikios Kontoleon arrived as Basil's successor in May of that year. After Basil's death, Melus revolted again; this time, he used a newly arrived band of Normans, sent by Pope Benedict, who met him (with or without Guaimar's aid) at Monte Gargano. Tornikios sent an army, led by Leo Passianos, against the Lombard-Norman coalition. Passianos and Melus met on the Fortore at Arenula; the battle was either indecisive (William of Apulia) or a victory for Melus (Leo of Ostia and Amatus). Tornikios then took command, leading his forces into a second encounter near Civita. This second battle was a victory for Melus, although Lupus Protospatharius and the anonymous chronicler of Bari recorded a defeat. A third battle (a decisive victory for Melus) took place at Vaccaricia, modern Vaccareccia in Rieti; the region from the Fortore to Trani was in his hands, and in September Tornikios was replaced by Basil Boioannes (who arrived in December). According to Amatus, there were five consecutive Lombard and Norman victories by October 1018.

At Boioannes' request, a detachment of the elite Varangian Guard was sent to Italy to fight the Normans. The armies met at the Ofanto near Cannae, the site of Hannibal's victory over the Romans in 216 BC, and the Battle of Cannae was a decisive Byzantine victory; Amatus wrote that only ten Normans survived from a contingent of 250. After the battle, Ranulf Drengot (one of the Norman survivors) was elected leader of their company. Boioannes protected his gains by building a fortress at the Apennine pass, guarding the entrance to the Apulian plain. In 1019 Troia (as the fortress was known) was garrisoned by Boioannes' Norman troops, an indication of Norman willingness to fight on either side. With Norman mercenaries on both sides, they would obtain good terms for the release of their brethren from their captors regardless of outcome.

Alarmed by the shift in momentum in the south, Pope Benedict (who may have initiated Norman involvement in the war) went north in 1020 to Bamberg to confer with Holy Roman Emperor Henry II. Although the emperor took no immediate action, events the following year persuaded him to intervene. Boioannes (allied with Pandulf of Capua) marched on Dattus, who was garrisoning a tower in the territory of the Duchy of Gaeta with papal troops. Dattus was captured and, on 15 June 1021, received the traditional Roman poena cullei: he was tied up in a sack with a monkey, a rooster and a snake and thrown into the sea. In 1022, a large imperial army marched south in three detachments under Henry II, Pilgrim of Cologne and Poppo of Aquileia to attack Troia. Although Troia did not fall, the Lombard princes were allied with the Empire and Pandulf removed to a German prison; this ended the Lombard revolt.

== Mercenary service, 1022–1046 ==
In 1024, Norman mercenaries under Ranulf Drengot were in the service of Guaimar III when he and Pandulf IV besieged Pandulf V in Capua. In 1026, after an 18-month siege, Capua surrendered and Pandulf IV was reinstated as prince. During the next few years Ranulf would attach himself to Pandulf, but in 1029 he joined Sergius IV of Naples (whom Pandulf expelled from Naples in 1027, probably with Ranulf's assistance).

In 1029, Ranulf and Sergius recaptured Naples. In early 1030 Sergius gave Ranulf the County of Aversa as a fief; that seigniory was long considered to be the first Norman lordship in southern Italy, although this primacy is currently attributed to the county of Ariano which was officially recognized by the Emperor Henry II since 1022. In historical terms, the later kingdom continued to rely heavily on such mainland county structures rather than simply superseding them with a uniform administrative order. Sergius also gave his sister, the widow of the duke of Gaeta, in marriage to Ranulf. In 1034, however, Sergius' sister died and Ranulf returned to Pandulf. According to Amatus:

For the Normans never desired any of the Lombards to win a decisive victory, in case this should be to their disadvantage. But now supporting the one and then aiding the other, they prevented anyone being completely ruined.

Norman reinforcements and local miscreants, who found a welcome in Ranulf's camp with no questions asked, swelled Ranulf's numbers. There, Amatus observed that the Norman language and customs welded a disparate group into the semblance of a nation. In 1035, the same year William the Conqueror would become Duke of Normandy, Tancred of Hauteville's three eldest sons (William "Iron Arm", Drogo and Humphrey) arrived in Aversa from Normandy.

In 1037, or the summer of 1038 (sources differ), Norman influence was further solidified when Emperor Conrad II deposed Pandulf and invested Ranulf as Count of Aversa. In 1038 Ranulf invaded Capua, expanding his polity into one of the largest in southern Italy.

In 1038 Byzantine Emperor Michael IV launched a military campaign into Muslim Sicily, with General George Maniaches leading the Christian army against the Saracens. The future king of Norway, Harald Hardrada, commanded the Varangian Guard in the expedition and Michael called on Guaimar IV of Salerno and other Lombard lords to provide additional troops for the campaign. Guiamar sent 300 Norman knights from Aversa, including the three Hauteville brothers (who would achieve renown for their prowess in battle). William of Hauteville became known as William Bras-de-Fer ("William Iron Arm") for single-handedly killing the emir of Syracuse during that city's siege. The Norman contingent would leave before the campaign's end due to the inadequate distribution of Saracen loot.

After the assassination of Catapan Nikephoros Dokeianos at Ascoli in 1040 the Normans elected Atenulf, brother of Pandulf III of Benevento, their leader. On 16 March 1041, near Venosa on the Olivento, the Norman army tried to negotiate with Catapan Michael Dokeianos; although they failed, they still defeated the Byzantine army in the Battle of Olivento. On 4 May 1041 the Norman army, led by William Iron Arm, defeated the Byzantines again in the Battle of Montemaggiore near Cannae (avenging the Norman defeat in the 1018 Battle of Cannae). Although the catapan summoned a large Varangian force from Bari, the battle was a rout; many of Michael's soldiers drowned in the Ofanto while retreating.

On 3 September 1041 at the Battle of Montepeloso, the Normans (nominally under Arduin and Atenulf) defeated Byzantine catepan Exaugustus Boioannes and brought him to Benevento. Around that time, Guaimar IV of Salerno began to attract the Normans. In February 1042, Atenulf negotiated the ransom of Exaugustus and then fled with the ransom money to Byzantine territory. He was replaced by Argyrus, who was bribed to defect to the Byzantines after a few early victories.

The revolt, originally Lombard, had become Norman in character and leadership. In September 1042, the three principal Norman groups held a council in Melfi which included Ranulf Drengot, Guaimar IV and William Iron Arm. William and the other leaders petitioned Guaimar to recognize their conquests, and William was acknowledged as the Norman leader in Apula (which included Melfi and the Norman garrison at Troia). He received the title of Count of Apulia from Guiamar, and (like Ranulf) was his vassal. Guaimar proclaimed himself Duke of Apulia and Calabria, although he was never formally invested as such by the Holy Roman Emperor. William was married to Guida (daughter of Guy, Duke of Sorrento and Guaimar's niece), strengthening the alliance between the Normans and Guaimar.

During their reign William and Guaimar began the conquest of Calabria in 1044, and built the castle of Stridula (near Squillace). William was less successful in Apulia, where he was defeated in 1045 near Taranto by Argyrus (although his brother, Drogo, conquered Bovino). At William's death, the period of Norman mercenary service ended with the rise of two Norman principalities owing nominal allegiance to the Holy Roman Empire: the County of Aversa (later the Principality of Capua) and the County of Apulia (later the Duchy of Apulia).

== County of Melfi, 1046–1059 ==
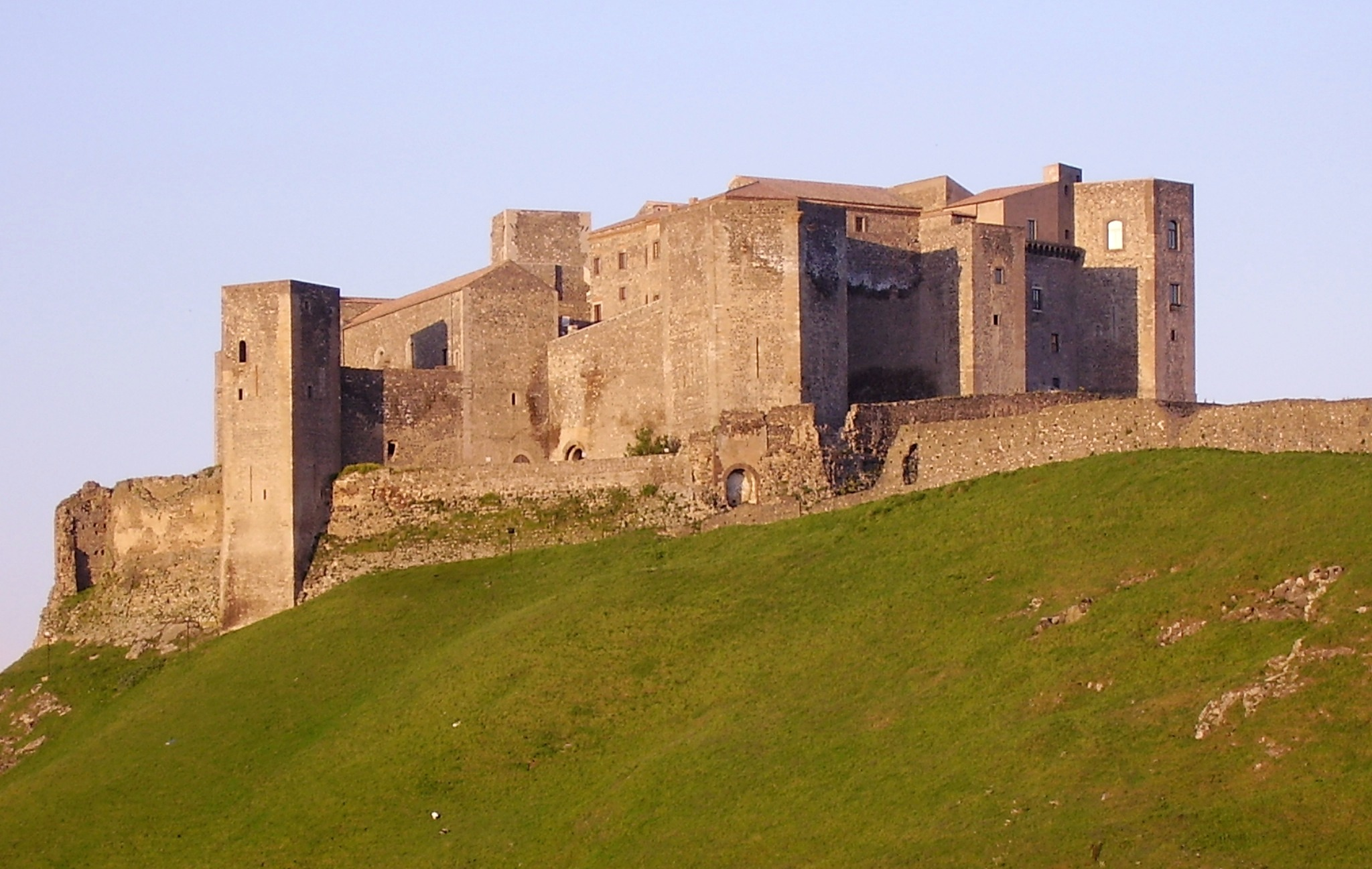
The stone castle at Melfi was constructed by the Normans where no fortress had previously stood. The present castle includes additions to a simple, rectangular Norman keep.

In 1046 Drogo entered Apulia and defeated the catepan, Eustathios Palatinos, near Taranto while his brother Humphrey forced Bari to conclude a treaty with the Normans. Also that year, Richard Drengot arrived with 40 knights from Normandy and Robert "Guiscard" Hauteville arrived with other Norman immigrants.

In 1047 Guaimar (who had supported Drogo's succession and the establishment of a Norman dynasty in the south) gave him his daughter, Gaitelgrima, in marriage. Emperor Henry III confirmed the county of Aversa in its fidelity to him and made Drogo his vassal, granting him the title dux et magister Italiae comesque Normannorum totius Apuliae et Calabriae (duke and master of Italy and count of the Normans of all Apulia and Calabria, the first legitimate title for the Normans of Melfi). Henry did not confirm the other titles given during the 1042 council; he demoted Guiamar to "prince of Salerno", and Capua was bestowed upon Pandulf IV for the third (and final) time. Henry, whose wife Agnes had been mistreated by the Beneventans, authorised Drogo to conquer Benevento for the imperial crown; he did so in 1053.

In 1048 Drogo commanded an expedition into Calabria via the valley of Crati, near Cosenza. He distributed the conquered territories in Calabria and gave his brother, Robert Guiscard, a castle at Scribla to guard the entrance to the recently conquered territory; Guiscard would later abandon it for a castle at San Marco Argentano. Shortly thereafter he married the daughter of another Norman lord, who gave him 200 knights (furthering his military campaign in Calabria). In 1051 Drogo was assassinated by Byzantine conspirators and was succeeded by his brother, Humphrey. Humphrey's first challenge was to deal with papal opposition to the Normans. The Norman knights' treatment of the Lombards during Drogo's reign triggered more revolts. During the unrest, the Italo-Norman John, Abbot of Fécamp was accosted on his return trip from Rome; he wrote to Pope Leo IX:

The hatred of the Italians for the Normans has now reached such a pitch that it is almost impossible for any Norman, albeit a pilgrim, to journey in the towns of Italy, without being assailed, abducted, robbed, beaten, thrown in irons, even if fortunate enough not to die in a prison.

The pope and his supporters, including the future Gregory VII, called for an army to oust the Normans from Italy.

Battle plan of Civitate: Normans in red, papal coalition in blue

On 18 June 1053, Humphrey led the Norman armies against the combined forces of the pope and the Holy Roman Empire. At the Battle of Civitate the Normans destroyed the papal army and captured Leo IX, imprisoning him in Benevento (which had surrendered). In 1054 Peter II, who succeeded Peter I in the region of Trani, captured the city from the Byzantines. Humphrey died in 1057; he was succeeded by Guiscard, who ended his loyalty to the Empire and made himself a papal vassal in return for the title of duke.

== County of Aversa, 1049–1098 ==
During the 1050s and 1060s, there were two centres of Norman power in southern Italy: one at Melfi (under the Hautevilles) and another at Aversa (under the Drengots). Richard Drengot became ruler of the County of Aversa in 1049, beginning a policy of territorial aggrandisement to compete with his Hauteville rivals. At first he warred with his Lombard neighbours, who included Pandulf VI of Capua, Atenulf I of Gaeta and Gisulf II of Salerno. Richard pushed back the borders of Salerno until there was little left of the once-great principality but the city of Salerno itself. Although he tried to extend his influence peacefully by betrothing his daughter to the oldest son of Atenulf of Gaeta, Richard later demanded the Lombard dower from the boy's parents when the boy died before the marriage. When the duke refused, Richard seized Aquino (one of Gaeta's few remaining fiefs) in 1058. However, the chronology of his conquest of Gaeta is confusing. Documents from 1058 and 1060 refer to Jordan (Richard's oldest son) as Duke of Gaeta, but these have been disputed as forgeries (since Atenulf was still duke when he died in 1062). After Atenulf's death, Richard and Jordan took over the rule of the duchy and allowed Atenulf's heir—Atenulf II—to rule as their subject until 1064 (when Gaeta was fully incorporated into the Drengot principality). Richard and Jordan appointed puppet, usually Norman, dukes.

When the prince of Capua died in 1057, Richard immediately besieged the comune. This chronology is also unclear. Pandulf was succeeded at Capua by his brother, Landulf VIII, who is recorded as prince until 12 May 1062. Richard and Jordan took the princely title in 1058, but apparently allowed Landulf to continue ruling beneath them for at least four years more. In 1059 Pope Nicholas II convened a synod at Melfi confirming Richard as Count of Aversa and Prince of Capua, and Richard swore allegiance to the papacy for his holdings. The Drengots then made Capua their headquarters for ruling Aversa and Gaeta.

Richard and Jordan expanded their new Gaetan and Capuan territories northwards toward Latium, into the Papal States. In 1066 Richard marched on Rome, but was easily repelled. Jordan's tenure as Richard's successor marked an alliance with the papacy (which Richard had attempted), and the conquests of Capua ceased. When Jordan died in 1090, his young son Richard II and his regents were unable to hold Capua. They were forced to flee the city by a Lombard, Lando, who ruled it with popular support until he was forced out by the combined Hauteville forces in the siege of Capua in 1098; this ended Lombard rule in Italy.

== Conquest of the Abruzzo, 1053–1105 ==
In 1077 the last Lombard prince of Benevento died, and in 1078 the pope appointed Robert Guiscard to succeed him. In 1081, however, Guiscard relinquished Benevento. By then, the principality comprised little more than Benevento and its environs; it had been reduced in size by Norman conquests during the previous decades, especially after the Battle of Civitate and after 1078. At Ceprano in June 1080 the pope again gave Guiscard control of Benevento, an attempt to halt Norman incursions into it and associated territory in the Abruzzi (which Guiscard's relatives had been appropriating).

After the Battle of Civitate, the Normans began the conquest of the Adriatic coast of Benevento. Geoffrey of Hauteville, a brother of the Hauteville counts of Melfi, conquered the Lombard county of Larino and stormed the castle Morrone in the region of Samnium-Guillamatum. Geoffrey's son, Robert, united these conquests into a county, Loritello, in 1061 and continued his expansion into Lombard Abruzzo. He conquered the Lombard county of Teate (modern Chieti) and besieged Ortona, which became the goal of Norman efforts in that region. Loritello soon reached as far north as the Pescara and the Papal States. In 1078 Robert allied with Jordan of Capua to ravage the Papal Abruzzo, but after a 1080 treaty with Pope Gregory VII they were obligated to respect papal territory. In 1100 Robert of Loritello extended his principality across the Fortore, taking Bovino and Dragonara.

The conquest of the Molise is poorly documented. Boiano (the principal town) may have been conquered the year before the Battle of Civitate by Robert Guiscard, who had encircled the Matese massif. The county of Boiano was bestowed on Rudolf of Moulins. His grandson, Hugh, expanded it eastward (occupying Toro and San Giovanni in Galdo) and westward (annexing the Capuan counties of Venafro, Pietrabbondante and Trivento in 1105).

== Conquest of Sicily, 1061–1091 ==
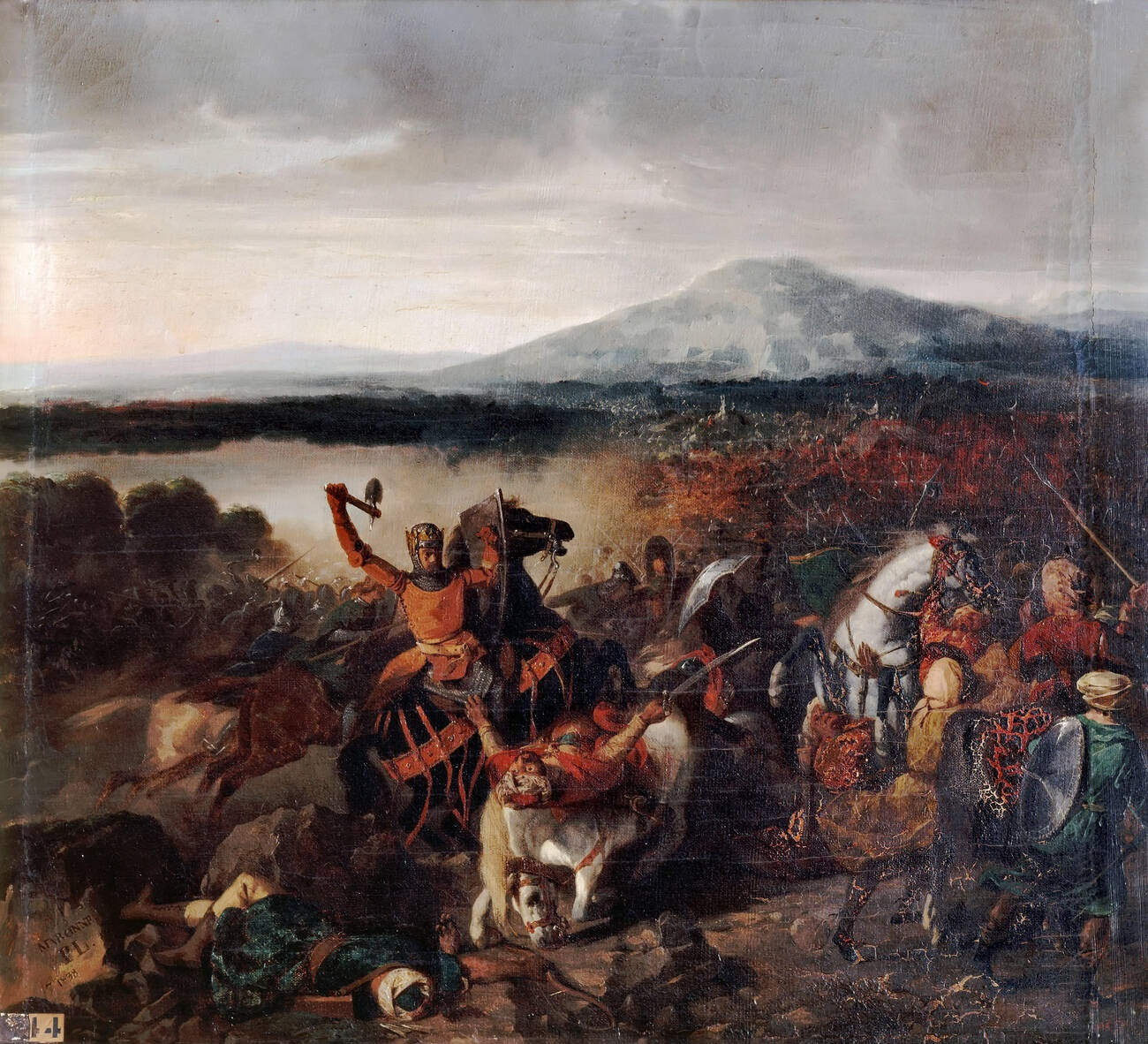
Roger I of Sicily at the 1063 Battle of Cerami, where he was victorious over 35,000 Saracens according to Goffredo Malaterra.

After roughly a century of Arab control (following the Saracen defeat of Byzantine forces in 965), Sicily was inhabited by a mix of Christians, Arab Muslims, and Muslim converts at the time of its conquest by the Normans. It had originally been under the rule of the Aghlabids and then the Fatimids, but in 948 the Kalbids wrested control of the island and held it until 1053. During the 1010s and 1020s, a series of succession crises paved the way for interference by the Zirids of Ifriqiya. Sicily was wracked by turmoil as petty fiefdoms battled each other for supremacy. Into this, the Normans under Robert Guiscard and his younger brother Roger Bosso came intending to conquer; the pope had conferred on Robert the title of "Duke of Sicily".

Robert and Roger first invaded Sicily in May 1061, crossing from Reggio di Calabria and besieging Messina for control of the strategically vital Strait of Messina. Roger crossed the strait first, landing unseen overnight and surprising the Saracen army in the morning. When Robert's troops landed later that day, they found themselves unopposed and Messina abandoned. Robert immediately fortified the city and allied himself with the emir, Ibn al-Timnah, against his rival Ibn al-Hawas. Robert, Roger, and at-Timnah then marched into the centre of the island by way of Rometta, which had remained loyal to at-Timnah. They passed through Frazzanò and the Pianura di Maniace (Plain of Maniakes), encountering resistance to their assault of Centuripe. Paternò fell quickly, and Robert brought his army to Castrogiovanni (modern Enna, the strongest fortress in central Sicily). Although the garrison was defeated the citadel did not fall, and with winter approaching Robert returned to Apulia. Before leaving, he built a fortress at San Marco d'Alunzio. Roger returned in late 1061 and captured Troina. In June 1063 he defeated a Muslim army at the Battle of Cerami, securing the Norman foothold on the island.

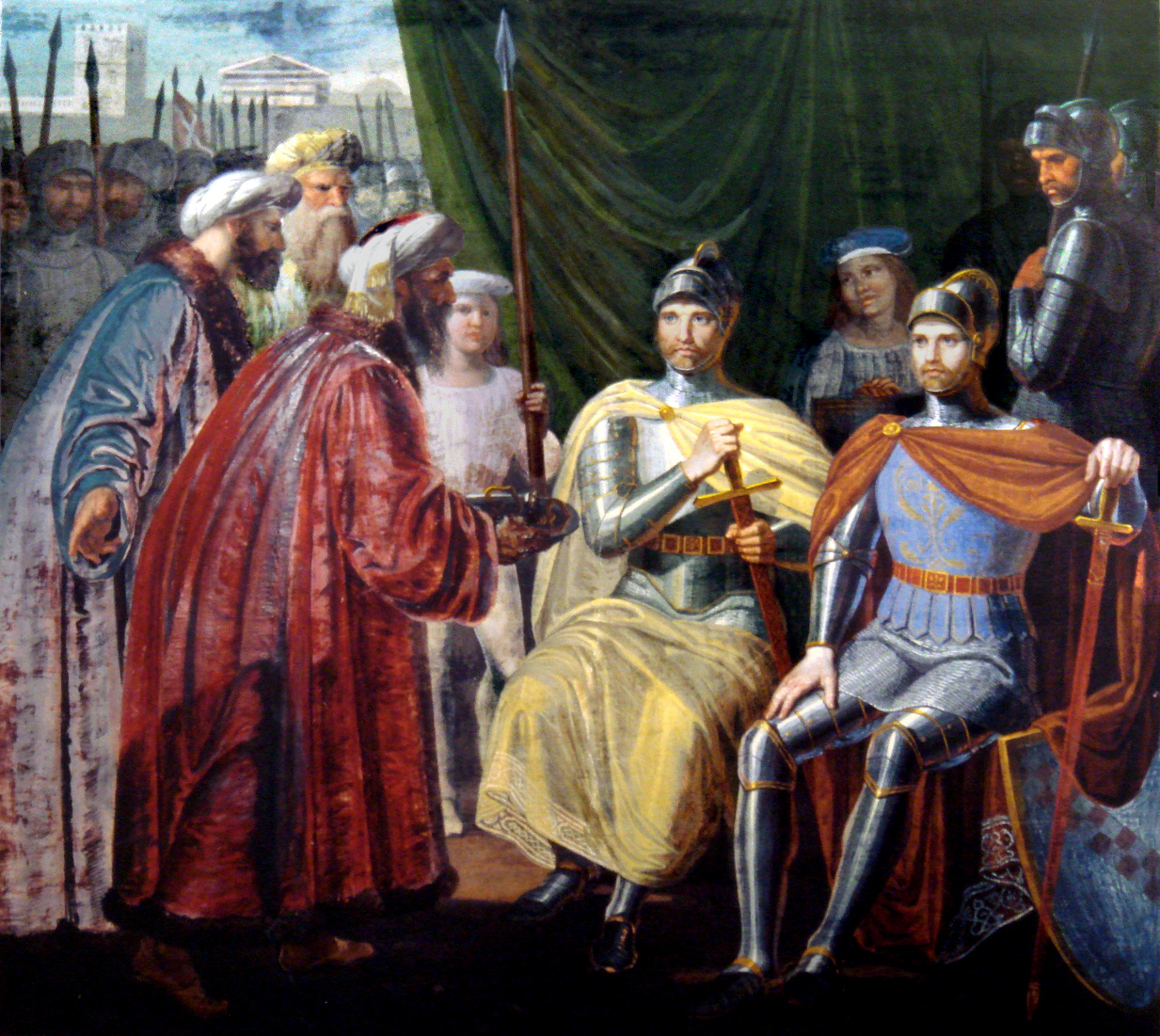
Roger I receiving the keys of Palermo in 1071

Robert returned in 1064, bypassing Castrogiovanni on his way to Palermo; this campaign was eventually called off. In 1068 Roger struck another defeat against the Muslims at the Battle of Misilmeri. In August 1071, the Normans began a second and successful siege of Palermo. The city of Palermo was entered by the Normans on 7 January 1072 and three days later the defenders of the inner-city surrendered. Robert invested Roger as Count of Sicily under the suzerainty of the Duke of Apulia. In a partition of the island with his brother Robert retained Palermo, half of Messina, and the largely Christian Val Demone (leaving the rest, including what was not yet conquered, to Roger).

In 1077 Roger besieged Trapani, one of the two remaining Saracen strongholds in the west of the island. His son, Jordan, led a sortie which surprised guards of the garrison's livestock. With its food supply cut off, the city soon surrendered. In 1079 Taormina was besieged, and in 1081 Jordan, Robert de Sourval and Elias Cartomi conquered Catania (a holding of the emir of Syracuse) in another surprise attack.

Roger left Sicily in the summer of 1083 to assist his brother on the mainland; Jordan (whom he had left in charge) revolted, forcing him to return to Sicily and subjugate his son. In 1085, he was finally able to undertake a systematic campaign. On 22 May Roger approached Syracuse by sea, while Jordan led a small cavalry detachment 25 kilometres (15 miles) north of the city. On 25 May, the navies of the count and the emir engaged in the harbour – where the latter was killed – while Jordan's forces besieged the city. The siege lasted throughout the summer, but when the city capitulated in March 1086 only Noto was still under Saracen dominion. In February 1091 Noto yielded as well, and the conquest of Sicily was complete.

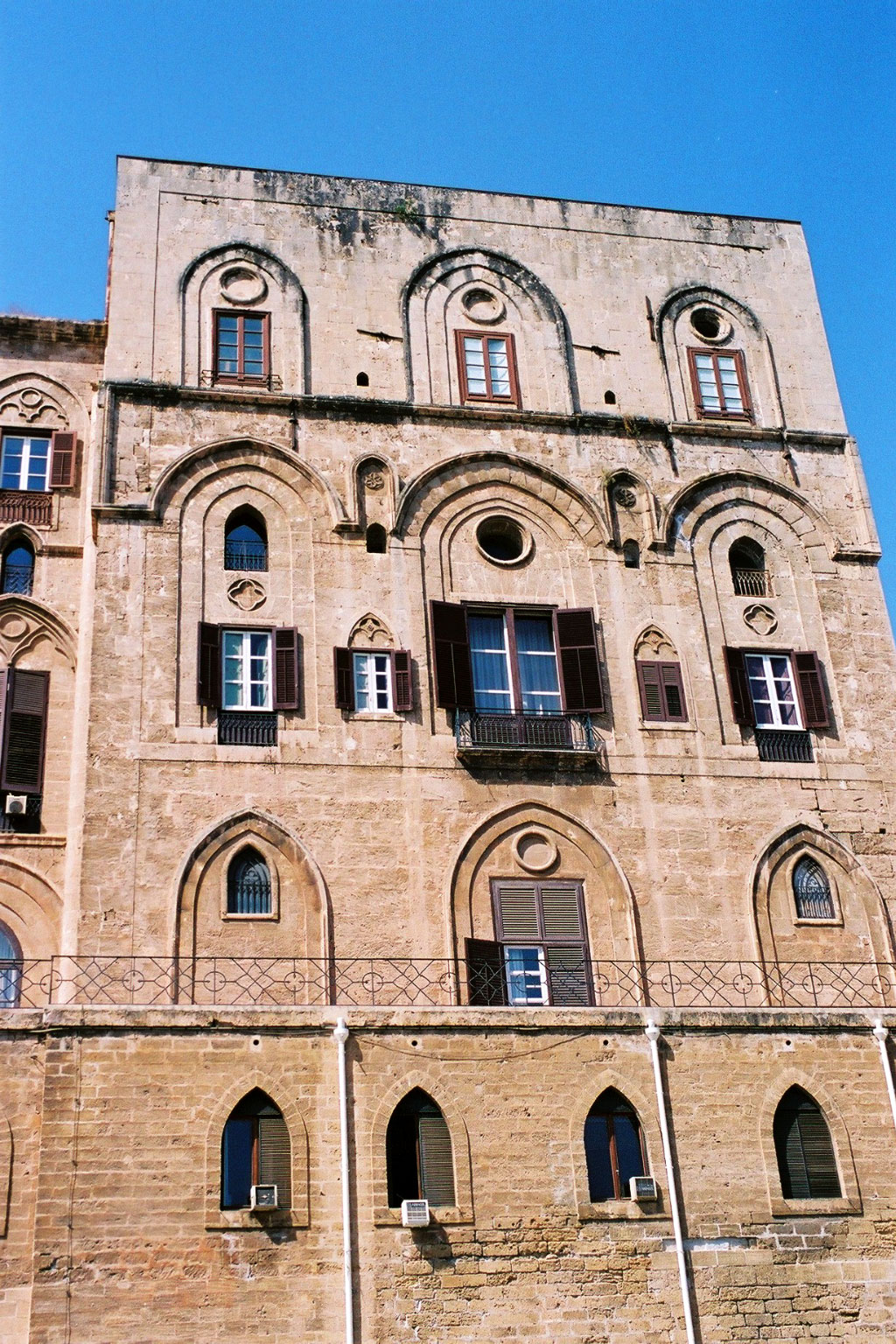
The Palazzo dei Normanni was a 9th-century Arab palace in Sicily, converted by the Normans into their governing castle.

In 1091, Roger invaded Malta and subdued the walled city of Mdina. He imposed taxes on the islands, but allowed the Arab governors to continue their rule. In 1127 Roger II abolished the Muslim government, replacing it with Norman officials. Under Norman rule, the Arabic spoken by the Greek Christian islanders for centuries of Muslim domination became Maltese.

== Conquest of Amalfi and Salerno, 1073–1077 ==
The fall of Amalfi and Salerno to Robert Guiscard were influenced by his wife, Sichelgaita. Amalfi probably surrendered as a result of her negotiations, and Salerno fell when she stopped petitioning her husband on behalf of her brother (the prince of Salerno). The Amalfitans unsuccessfully subjected themselves to Prince Gisulf to avoid Norman suzerainty, but the states (whose histories had been joined since the 9th century) ultimately came under Norman control.

By summer 1076, through piracy and raids Gisulf II of Salerno incited the Normans to destroy him; that season, under Richard of Capua and Robert Guiscard the Normans united to besiege Salerno. Although Gisulf ordered his citizens to store two years' worth of food, he confiscated enough of it to starve his subjects. On 13 December 1076, the city submitted; the prince and his retainers retreated to the citadel, which fell in May 1077. Although Gisulf's lands and relics were confiscated, he remained at liberty. The Principality of Salerno had already been reduced to little more than the capital city and its environs by previous wars with William of the Principate, Roger of Sicily and Robert Guiscard. However, the city was the most important in southern Italy and its capture was essential to the creation of a kingdom fifty years later.

In 1073 Sergius III of Amalfi died, leaving the infant John III as his successor. Desiring protection in unstable times, the Amalfitans exiled the young duke and summoned Robert Guiscard that year. Amalfi, however, remained restless under Norman control. Robert's successor, Roger Borsa, took control of Amalfi in 1089 after expelling Gisulf (the deposed Prince of Salerno, whom the citizens had installed with papal aid). From 1092 to 1097 Amalfi did not recognise its Norman suzerain, apparently seeking Byzantine help; Marinus Sebaste was installed as ruler in 1096.

Robert's son Bohemond I of Antioch and his brother Roger of Sicily attacked Amalfi in 1097, but were repulsed. During this siege, the Normans began to be drawn by the First Crusade. Marinus was defeated after Amalfitan noblemen defected to the Norman side and betrayed him in 1101. Amalfi revolted again in 1130, when Roger II of Sicily demanded its loyalty. It was finally subdued in 1131 when Admiral John marched on it by land and George of Antioch blockaded it by sea, establishing a base on Capri.

== Byzantine–Norman wars, 1059–1085 ==
Norman progress in Sicily during Robert's expeditions to the Balkans: Capua, Apulia, Calabria, and the County of Sicily are Norman. The Emirate of Sicily, the Duchy of Naples and lands in the Abruzzo (in the southern Duchy of Spoleto) are not yet conquered.

The Normans' initial military involvement in southern Italy was on the side of the Lombards against the Byzantines. Eventually, some Normans, including the powerful de Hauteville brothers, served in the army of George Maniaches during the attempted Byzantine reconquest of Sicily, only to turn against their employers when the emirs proved difficult to conquer. By 1030, Rainulf became count of Aversa, marking the start of permanent Norman settlement in Italy. In 1042, William de Hauteville was made a count, taking Lombard prince Guaimar IV of Salerno as his liege. To further strengthen ties and legitimacy, Robert Guiscard also married Lombard Princess Sikelgaita in 1058. Following the death of Guaimar, the Normans were increasingly independent actors on the south Italian scene, which brought them into direct conflict with Byzantium.

During the time that the Normans had conquered southern Italy, the Byzantine Empire was in a state of internal decay; the administration of the Empire had been wrecked, the efficient government institutions that provided Basil II with a quarter of a million troops and adequate resources by taxation had collapsed within a period of three decades. Attempts by Isaac I Komnenos and Romanos IV Diogenes to reverse the situation proved unfruitful. The premature death of the former and the overthrow of the latter led to further collapse as the Normans consolidated their conquest of Sicily and Italy.

Reggio Calabria, the capital of the tagma of Calabria, was captured by Robert Guiscard in 1060. At the time, the Byzantines held a few coastal towns in Apulia, including Bari, the capital of the catepanate of Italy. In 1067–68, they gave financial support to a rebellion against Guiscard. In 1068, the Normans besieged Otranto; in the same year, they began the siege of Bari itself. After defeating the Byzantines in a series of battles in Apulia, and after two major attempts to relieve the city had failed, the city Bari surrendered in April 1071, ending the Byzantine presence in southern Italy.

In 1079–80, the Byzantines again gave their support to a rebellion against Guiscard. This support came largely in the form of financing smaller Norman mercenary groups to assist in the rebellion

Over a thirty-year period (1061–1091), Norman factions also completed the initial Byzantine attempt to retake Sicily. However, it would not be until 1130 that both Sicily and southern Italy were united into one kingdom, formalized by Roger II of Sicily.

== Conquest of Naples, 1077–1139 ==
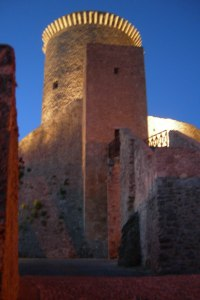
Norman castle at San Marco Argentano

The Duchy of Naples, nominally a Byzantine possession, was one of the last southern Italian states to be attacked by the Normans. Since Sergius IV asked for Ranulf Drengot's help during the 1020s, with brief exceptions the dukes of Naples were allied with the Normans of Aversa and Capua. Beginning in 1077, the incorporation of Naples into the Hauteville state took sixty years to complete.

In summer 1074, hostilities flared up between Richard of Capua and Robert Guiscard. Sergius V of Naples allied with the latter, making his city a supply centre for Guiscard's troops. This pitted him against Richard, who was supported by Gregory VII. In June Richard briefly besieged Naples; Richard, Robert and Sergius soon began negotiations with Gregory, mediated by Desiderius of Montecassino.

In 1077 Naples was again besieged by Richard of Capua, with a naval blockade by Robert Guiscard. Richard died during the siege in 1078, after the deathbed lifting of his excommunication. The siege was ended by his successor, Jordan, to insinuate himself with the papacy (which had made peace with Duke Sergius).

In 1130, the Antipope Anacletus II crowned Roger II of Sicily king and declared the fief of Naples part of his kingdom. In 1131, Roger demanded from the citizens of Amalfi the defences of their city and the keys to their castle. When they refused, Sergius VII of Naples initially prepared to aid them with a fleet; George of Antioch blockaded Naples' port with a large armada and Sergius, cowed by the suppression of the Amalfitans, submitted to Roger. According to the chronicler Alexander of Telese, Naples "which, since Roman times, had hardly ever been conquered by the sword now submitted to Roger on the strength of a mere report (i.e. Amalfi's fall)."

In 1134 Sergius supported the rebellion of Robert II of Capua and Ranulf II of Alife, but avoided direct confrontation with Roger and paid homage to the king after the fall of Capua. On 24 April 1135 a Pisan fleet with 8,000 reinforcements, captained by Robert of Capua, anchored in Naples and the duchy was the centre of the revolt against Roger II for the next two years. Sergius, Robert and Ranulf were besieged in Naples until the spring of 1136, by which time starvation was widespread. According to historian (and rebel sympathiser) Falco of Benevento Sergius and the Neapolitans did not relent, "preferring to die of hunger than to bare their necks to the power of an evil king." The naval blockade's failure to prevent Sergius and Robert from twice bringing supplies from Pisa exemplified Roger's inadequacy. When a relief army commanded by Emperor Lothair II marched to Naples, the siege was lifted. Although the emperor left the following year, in return for a pardon Sergius re-submitted to Roger in Norman feudal homage. On 30 October 1137, the last Duke of Naples died in the king's service at the Battle of Rignano.

The defeat at Rignano enabled the Norman conquest of Naples, since Sergius died without heir and the Neapolitan nobility could not reach a succession agreement. However, it was two years between Sergius' death and Naples' incorporation by Sicily. The nobility apparently ruled during the interim, which may have been the final period of Neapolitan independence from Norman rule. During this period Norman landowners first appear in Naples, although the Pisans (enemies of Roger II) retained their alliance with the duchy and Pisa may have sustained its independence until 1139. That year, Roger absorbed Naples into his kingdom; Pope Innocent II and the Neapolitan nobility acknowledged Roger's young son, Alfonso of Hauteville, as duke.

== Kingdom of Sicily, 1130–1198 ==
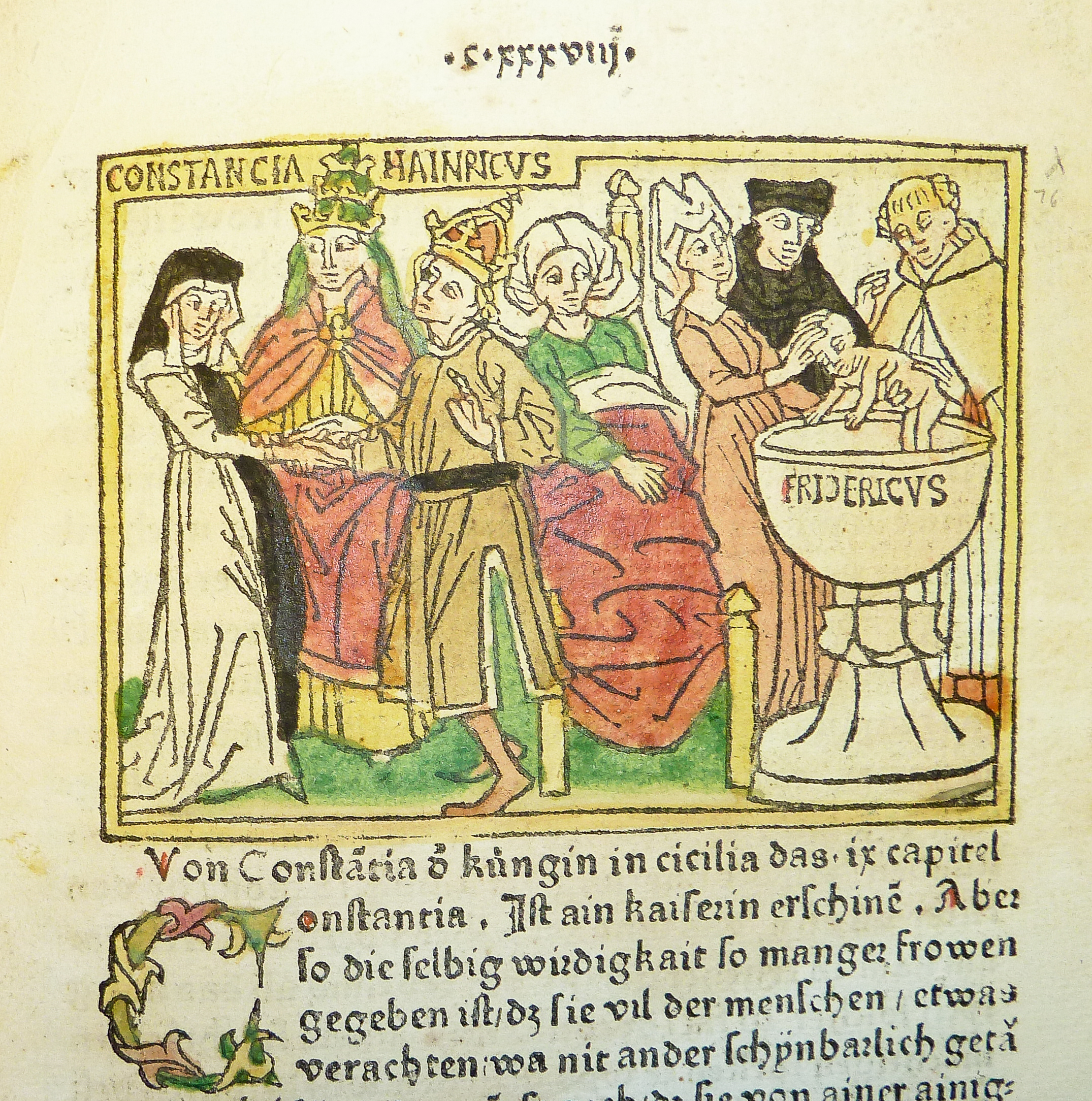
Woodcut illustration of Constance of Sicily, her husband Emperor Henry VI and her son Frederick II

Although the conquest of Sicily was primarily military, Robert and Roger also signed treaties with the Muslims to obtain land. Hindered by Sicily's hilly terrain and a relatively small army, the brothers sought influential, worn-down Muslim leaders to sign the treaties (offering peace and protection for land and titles). Because Sicily was conquered by a unified command, Roger's authority was not challenged by other conquerors and he maintained power over his Greek, Arab, Lombard and Norman subjects. Latin Christianity was introduced to the island, and its ecclesiastical organisation was overseen by Roger with papal approval. Sees were established at Palermo (with metropolitan authority), Syracuse and Agrigento. After its elevation to a Kingdom of Sicily in 1130, Sicily became the centre of Norman power with Palermo as capital. The Kingdom was created on Christmas Day, 1130, by Roger II of Sicily, with the agreement of Pope Innocent II, who united the lands Roger had inherited from his father Roger I of Sicily.

These areas included the Maltese Archipelago, which was conquered from the Arabs of the Emirates of Sicily; the Duchy of Apulia and the County of Sicily, which had belonged to his cousin William II, Duke of Apulia, until William's death in 1127; and the other Norman vassals.

Recent scholarship on the mainland kingdom has stressed, however, that the creation of the kingdom did not simply replace earlier comital and aristocratic structures with a uniform centralised order. Royal rule continued to depend on negotiated relationships with counties and lordships and on mechanisms for supervising military obligations and territorial control across the mainland provinces. In this sense, the kingdom reframed rather than erased the political significance of mainland lordship and county organisation.

When the invasion of Henry VI, Holy Roman Emperor on behalf of his wife, Constance, the daughter of Roger II, eventually prevailed, the kingdom fell in 1194 to the House of Hohenstaufen. Through Constance, the Hauteville blood was passed to Frederick II, Holy Roman Emperor, who succeeded as King of Sicily in 1198.

== Encastellation ==
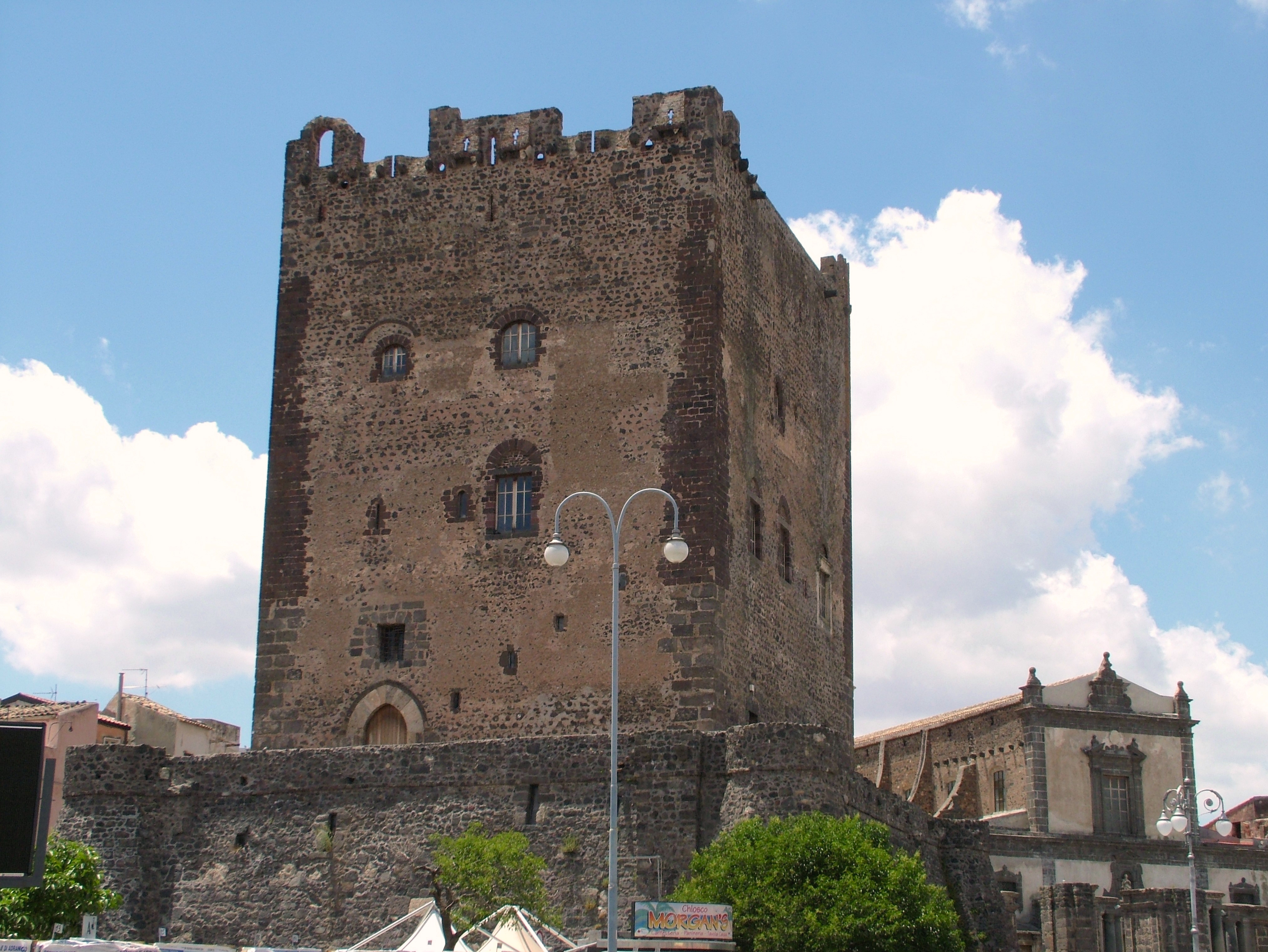
The early Norman castle at Adrano

The Norman conquest of southern Italy began an infusion of Romanesque (specifically Norman) architecture. Some castles were expanded on existing Lombard, Byzantine or Arab structures, while others were original constructions. Latin cathedrals were built in lands recently converted from Byzantine Christianity or Islam, in a Romanesque style influenced by Byzantine and Islamic designs. Public buildings, such as palaces, were common in larger cities (notably Palermo); these structures, in particular, demonstrate the influence of Siculo-Norman culture.

The Normans rapidly began the construction, expansion and renovation of castles in southern Italy. By the end of the Norman period, most wooden castles were converted to stone.

After the Lombard castle at Melfi, which was conquered by the Normans early and augmented with a surviving, rectangular donjon late in the 11th century, Calabria was the first province affected by Norman encastellation. In 1046 William Iron Arm began construction of Stridula (a large castle near Squillace), and by 1055 Robert Guiscard built three castles: at Rossano, on the site of a Byzantine fortress; at Scribla, the seat of his fief guarding the pass of the Val di Crati, and at San Marco Argentano (donjon built in 1051) near Cosenza. In 1058, Scalea was built on a seaside cliff.

Guiscard was a major castle-builder after his accession to the Apulian countship, building a castle at Gargano with pentagonal towers known as the Towers of Giants. Later, Henry, Count of Monte Sant'Angelo built a castle at nearby Castelpagano. In the Molise the Normans built many fortresses into the naturally defensible terrain, such as Santa Croce and Ferrante. The region of a line running from Terracina to Termoli has the greatest density of Norman castles in Italy. Many sites were originally Samnite strongholds reused by the Romans and their successors; the Normans called such a fortress a castellum vetus (old castle). Many Molisian castles have walls integrated into the mountains and ridges, and much of the quickly erected masonry demonstrates that the Normans introduced the opus gallicum into the Molise.

The encastellation of Sicily was begun at the behest of the native Greek inhabitants. In 1060, they asked Guiscard to construct a castle at Aluntium. The first Norman building on Sicily, San Marco d'Alunzio (named after Guiscard's first castle at Argentano in Calabria), was erected; its ruins survive. Petralia Soprana was then built near Cefalù, followed by a castle at Troina in 1071; in 1073 a castle was built at Mazara and another at Paternò . At Adrano (or Aderno) the Normans built a plain, rectangular donjon whose floor plan illustrates 11th-century Norman design. An outside stairway leads to the first-storey entrance, and the interior is divided lengthwise down the middle into a great hall on one side and two rooms (a chapel and chamber) on the other.

== See also ==
- Vikings
- Normans
- Byzantine-Norman Wars
- First Crusade
