= 1018 =

Calendar year

1018 in various calendars
- Gregorian calendar: 1018; MXVIII
- Ab urbe condita: 1771
- Armenian calendar: 467; ԹՎ ՆԿԷ
- Assyrian calendar: 5768
- Balinese saka calendar: 939–940
- Bengali calendar: 424–425
- Berber calendar: 1968
- English Regnal year: N/A
- Buddhist calendar: 1562
- Burmese calendar: 380
- Byzantine calendar: 6526–6527
- Chinese calendar: 丁巳年 (Fire Snake); 3715 or 3508 — to — 戊午年 (Earth Horse); 3716 or 3509
- Coptic calendar: 734–735
- Discordian calendar: 2184
- Ethiopian calendar: 1010–1011
- Hebrew calendar: 4778–4779
- Hindu calendars
- Vikram Samvat: 1074–1075
- Shaka Samvat: 939–940
- Kali Yuga: 4118–4119
- Holocene calendar: 11018
- Igbo calendar: 18–19
- Iranian calendar: 396–397
- Islamic calendar: 408–409
- Japanese calendar: Kannin 2 (寛仁２年)
- Javanese calendar: 920–921
- Julian calendar: 1018; MXVIII
- Korean calendar: 3351
- Minguo calendar: 894 before ROC 民前894年
- Nanakshahi calendar: −450
- Seleucid era: 1329/1330 AG
- Thai solar calendar: 1560–1561
- Tibetan calendar: མེ་མོ་སྦྲུལ་ལོ་ (female Fire-Snake); 1144 or 763 or −9 — to — ས་ཕོ་རྟ་ལོ་ (male Earth-Horse); 1145 or 764 or −8

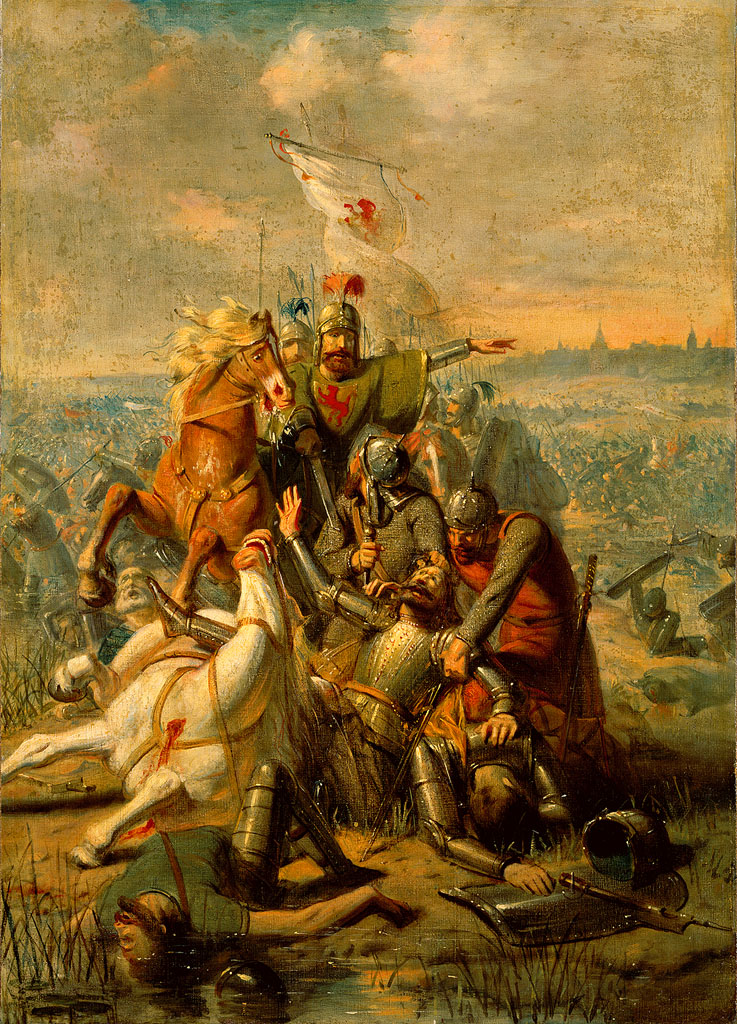
The Battle of Vlaardingen (Netherlands)

Year 1018 (MXVIII) was a common year starting on Wednesday of the Julian calendar.

== Events ==
=== By place ===
==== Europe ====
- January 30 – The Peace of Bautzen: Emperor Henry II signs a peace treaty with Bolesław I the Brave, Duke of Poland, ending the German–Polish War. Poland keeps Lusatia – the Holy Roman Empire keeps Bohemia. With this peace agreement, Bolesław redirects his forces on an offensive against the Kievan Rus'.
- July 22–23 – Battle of the River Bug: Polish forces under Bolesław I defeat Yaroslav the Wise near the River Bug. Yaroslav retreats to Novgorod, abandoning Kiev.
- July 29 – Battle of Vlaardingen: Henry II sends an army towards Holland to subdue the rebellious Count Dirk III. The Imperial forces are defeated near Vlaardingen.
- August 14 – Bolesław I accepts the surrender of Kiev by the Pechenegs. He reinstates Sviatopolk I as Grand Prince of Kiev.
- August 15 – Ivats, Bulgarian nobleman and rebel leader, is treacherously blinded and captured by strategos Eustathios Daphnomeles, ending the last resistance to the Byzantine conquest of Bulgaria by Basil II.
- October 1 – Battle of Carham: King Malcolm II of Scotland and Owain Foel ("the Bald") of Strathclyde are victorious over either Uhtred the Bold or Eadwulf Cudel, rulers of Bamburgh. The battle confirms Scottish dominance over Lothian.
- October – Battle of Cannae: The Lombard adventurer Melus of Bari and his Norman mercenaries are decisively defeated by the Byzantine army, led by the Catepan Basil Boioannes.
- Cnut ("the Great"), King of England, travels to Denmark to succeed his brother Harald II on the Danish throne.

==== Africa ====
- Egyptian military commander Sa'id ibn Isa ibn Nasturus appointed Vizier of Egypt.

==== Asia ====
- January 22 – Emperor Go-Ichijō of Japan celebrates his coming-of-age ceremony; he is aged 9 at this time.
- November 26 – 19-year-old Fujiwara no Ishi marries her nephew Go-Ichijō, becoming Empress of Japan (Chugu), the third in succession of the daughters of influential court official Fujiwara no Michinaga to become Empress. Michinaga, who sent her to court in March, holds a banquet in celebration.
- December – Goryeo–Khitan War: Khitan forces of the Liao dynasty invade Goryeo (North Korea). Goryeo forces led by General Kang Kam-ch'an annihilates the Khitan army at Kusong.

=== By topic ===
==== Religion ====
- Buckfast Abbey (located near Buckfastleigh) is founded as a Benedictine monastery in England.

== Births ==
- April 10 – Nizam al-Mulk, Persian scholar and vizier (d. 1092)
- August 31 – Jeongjong II, ruler of Goryeo (Korea) (d. 1046)
- Abul Hasan Hankari, Abbasid scholar and jurist (d. 1093)
- Bagrat IV, Georgian king of the Bagrationi dynasty (d. 1072)
- Ermengarde of Anjou, duchess of Burgundy (d. 1076)
- Harthacnut (or Cnut III), king of Denmark (d. 1042)
- Michael Psellos, Byzantine monk and philosopher (approximate date)
- Richilde, countess and regent of Flanders (d. 1086)
- Victor II, pope of the Roman Catholic Church (d. 1057)

== Deaths ==
- February 24 – Borrell, bishop of Vic (Spain)
- February 25 – Arnulf II, archbishop of Milan
- March 22 – Ali ibn Hammud al-Nasir, caliph of Córdoba
- June 23 – Henry I ("the Strong"), margrave of Austria
- July 7 – Gerberga of Burgundy, duchess of Swabia
- September 25 – Berthold of Toul, German bishop
- October 1
  - Gilbert Buatère, Norman nobleman
  - Osmond Drengot, Norman nobleman
- December 1 – Thietmar, bishop of Merseburg (b. 975)
- Abd al-Rahman IV, Umayyad caliph of Córdoba
- Aeddan ap Blegywryd, king of Gwynedd
- Adolf I of Lotharingia, German nobleman
- Aldhun, bishop of Lindisfarne (or 1019)
- Dragomir, ruler of Travunia and Zachlumia
- Harald II, king and regent of Denmark
- Ivan Vladislav, emperor (tsar) of Bulgaria
- Frederick, German nobleman (b. 974)
