= Osmond Drengot =

11th century Norman noble

Osmond Drengot (c. 985 – 1 October 1018) was one of the first Norman adventurers in the Mezzogiorno. He was the son of a petty, but rich, lord of Carreaux, at Bosc-Hyons in the region of Rouen. Carreaux gives his family the alternate name of de Quarrel.

In 1016, Osmond took part in a hunt with Duke Richard II of Normandy. While on hunt, he killed one William Repostel, a relative of the duke, in revenge for his sleeping with one of Osmond's daughters. Richard pardoned his life, but exiled him. Osmond fled to Italy, there to join the Byzantines in their fight against the Lombards, Saracens, papalists, and Holy Roman Empire.

Before leaving Normandy, he raised an armed band of approximately 250 warriors: adventurers, outlaws, younger sons (without a future in France), and four of his own brothers, namely Asclettin, Gilbert, Ralph, and Rainulf. In Italy, he and his followers joined with Melus of Bari and Guaimar III of Salerno, Lombards in revolt against Byzantine pretensions. In 1018, Osmond and Gilbert died in the Battle of Cannae, a grave Norman defeat at the hands of the Greek general Basil Boioannes.
