= Ranulf II of Alife =

12th-century Italo-Norman nobleman

Ranulf II (or Rainulf II, Italian: Rainulfo; died 30 April 1139) was the count of Alife and Caiazzo, and duke of Apulia. He was a member of the Italo-Norman Drengot family which ruled the Principality of Capua for most of the century between 1050 and 1150. Ranulf's wife, Matilda, was the sister of King Roger II of Sicily.

== Family ==
Ranulf II was the son of Robert, count of Alife and Caiazzo, and Gaitelgrima. His grandfather was Ranulf I of Caiazzo, a brother of Prince Richard I of Capua. His great-grandfather was Asclettin, count of Acerenza. Asclettin was a brother of the Ranulf Drengot, the first Norman fiefholder in Italy. As the third Ranulf in his family, Ranulf of Alife is sometimes called "Ranulf III".

== Rise to influence ==
In July 1127, Duke William II of Apulia died. Count Roger II of Sicily believed that the duchy passed to him. However, this was opposed by many of the largely Norman nobility on the mainland, and in this they had the support of Pope Honorius II. A rallying-point for this opposition might have been the only other independent prince in southern Italy, Count Jordan of Ariano, but he also died on 12 August 1127. His heir was the short-lived Prince Jordan II but, on his death on 19 December, his son Robert II of Capua became Prince. His leading lord was Ranulf of Alife.

In December, Honorius visited Capua, a longtime papal ally, and there organised the resistance to Roger's claim, recruiting both Ranulf and Robert to his cause. He promised them that all who took part in the campaign against Roger would earn remission of their sins. Robert's leadership was less than stellar and Ranulf was soon the effective military leader of the opposition. When Roger arrived on the peninsula with an army, Ranulf tried to organise resistance, especially in Troia, but gave up when Roger threatened to invade his lands. Eventually, the rebels' negotiations with Roger led to a truce by which Honorius invested Roger as Duke of Apulia and Calabria in August 1128.

Ranulf appeared loyal to Roger after his coronation as King of Sicily on 30 December 1130. In 1131, he and Robert took a force of 200 knights at Roger's bequest to Rome in a show of force in support of Antipope Anacletus II. However, while Ranulf was away at Rome, his wife, Matilda, along with her son, fled to her brother Roger in Salerno alleging marital cruelty. Roger summoned Ranulf to court but he refused to appear. Roger was particularly concerned with Ranulf thinking he could carry on much as he had always done in or near his own power-base. Roger was forced by his vassal's contumacy and perfidy to annex the county of Avellino from Richard, Ranulf's brother. Ranulf demanded the restitution of both wife and comital title. Both were denied and Ranulf left Rome, against orders. Roger gave him the opportunity to submit to a formal proceeding at Salerno, but Ranulf instead went to Robert, who also left Rome, and the two began planning another insurrection.

== Rebel leader ==
Southern Italy in 1112. Numerous smaller city-states, usually under the suzerainty or vassalage of the larger states, are not shown. The two great battles of Ranulf's generalship are shown: Rignano and Nocera, indicated by crossed sabres.

Soon most of the peninsular baronage was behind the rebel leaders. Roger II was distracted temporarily by a rebellion in Apulia, but with the surrender of Grimoald, Prince of Bari, he could turn to face the Capuan renegades. They took Benevento, an ally of both pope and king, and turned towards Roger's royal army. Roger moved to besiege Nocera, but was met by the rebel army: Robert on the left, Ranulf on the right. On 24 July, the armies met at the Battle of Nocera. The rebels were victorious and Roger fled.

A large army under Lothair of Germany was expected, but instead the Emperor left Italy after his coronation, despite Ranulf's attendance. Therefore, that year, 1133, Roger was able to return to the peninsula from his stronghold in Sicily and reverse many of the rebel successes. But new revolts opened up. Ranulf supported Tancred of Conversano with men under Roger of Plenco, but otherwise, kept a lower profile, awaiting reinforcements from Pisa and Genoa. Ranulf failed to deliver Nocera from a siege and Robert of Capua fled north. By June 1134, Ranulf's own supporters had melted away and he was forced to make peace with the king. According to Alexander of Telese, the two kissed and embraced such that "those that were present were seen to be shedding tears for very joy." Ranulf's gains since the outbreak of rebellion were taken back, but his wife and son returned to him amicably.

In 1135, a Pisan fleet with Robert of Capua laid anchor in Naples. With rumours of Roger's death circulating, Ranulf joined Robert and Duke Sergius VII of Naples in that city and prepared for a siege.

In 1136, Lothair II and the duke of Bavaria, Henry the Proud, descended the peninsula to support the three rebels. Ranulf, with Robert and Henry, took a large contingent of troops to besiege the peninsular capital of the kingdom, Salerno. Salerno surrendered and the large army of Germans and Normans marched to the very south of Apulia. Having thus left most of southern Italy under his control, Lothair decided to appoint a new duke of Apulia and since Robert and Sergius were already powerful potentates, Ranulf was raised to that position. Lothair claimed the right to investiture, but so did Pope Innocent II; the former on the grounds that Emperor Henry III had appointed Drogo of Hauteville in 1047 and the latter on the grounds that Pope Nicholas II had raised Robert Guiscard to ducal status in 1059. Together, pope and emperor handed power to Ranulf in Salerno and the Germans departed for home, leaving Ranulf to defend his hard-won duchy. Ranulf accompanied the emperor as far as Aquino and received 800 knights for his fight.

== Dukedom and death ==
On 30 October 1137, at the Battle of Rignano, Ranulf met his chief foe, Roger's son Roger, whom the king had named as Duke of Apulia in 1134. Though the younger Roger fought valiantly, the elder fled the field and their ally, Sergius VII of Naples, died in the fray. Rignano was the second great victory of Ranulf over Roger (after Nocera), but it, like the first, had no lasting effect. Roger's campaign of 1138 was a failure and Ranulf for a moment appeared secure in his title, even without Salerno. However, Ranulf fell sick with fever at Troia, his capital, and died on 30 April 1139. He was buried in the cathedral of that city, whence Roger exhumed him and threw him in a ditch, only to later rebury him decently. While the modern scholar John Julius Norwich says that "the sorrow that attended his death was more than he deserved", the contemporary chronicler Falco of Benevento records that the death of this virum bellicosum et magnanimum ("bellicose and magnanimous man") was accompanied by the wailing of virgins and tearing of hair.

== Sources ==
Primary sources

- Alexander of Telese. The Deeds Done by King Roger of Sicily.
- Falco of Benevento. Chronicon Beneventanum.

Secondary sources

- Houben, Hubert. Roger II of Sicily: A Ruler between East and West, trans. G. A. Loud and Diane Milbourne. Cambridge: Cambridge University Press, 2002.
- Matthew, Donald. The Norman Kingdom of Sicily. Cambridge: Cambridge University Press, 1992.
- Norwich, John Julius. The Normans in the South, 1016–1130. London: Longman, 1967.
- Norwich, John Julius. The Kingdom in the Sun, 1130–1194. London: Longman, 1970.
- Gambella, Angelo. "Rainulfo di Alife: Uomo di guerra normanno." Medioevo in Guerra, ed. A. Gambella. Rome: Drengo, 2008. ISBN 978-88-88812-19-9
