= Ralph Drengot =

Rudolph Drengot was one of the Drengot family of Norman adventureres who came to Southern Italy with his brothers, Gilbert, Asclettin, Osmond, and Ranulf.

The Drengots arrived in Italy in 1017 to support Melus of Bari in his rebellion against the Catapanate. According to some sources, they stopped in Rome on the way and Rudolph had an audience with Pope Benedict VIII. Whatever the case, they aided Melus until their defeat at the Battle of Cannae (1018).

After this, Melus went north to Bamberg to meet the Emperor Henry II. Rudolph accompanied him. It is certain that Rudolph had an opportunity to then meet with the pope. He returned to the south on the emperor's expedition, after Melus' death, and was installed at Comino under one of Melus' nephews, a count. Rudolph then led some Normans back to Normandy.

== Sources ==
- Rodulfus Glaber. Opera, ed. J. France. Oxford, 1989.
- Chalandon, Ferdinand. Histoire de la domination normande en Italie et en Sicile. Paris, 1907.
