= Drengot family =

11th-12th century Norman mercenary family active in Southern Italy

The Drengots were a Norman family of mercenaries, one of the first to head to Southern Italy to fight in the service of the Lombards. Alongside the Hautevilles, they became one of the most important Norman kin-groups on the mainland, above all through their domination of Aversa and Capua. Cadet branches of the family, especially those of Caiazzo and Carinola, remained politically important in the Terra di Lavoro well into the twelfth century.

== Origins ==
The family came from Carreaux, near Avesnes-en-Bray, east of Rouen. From Quarrelis or Quadrellis, the Latin for Carreaux, the family gets its alternate name of "de Quarrel".

The first members of the family known are five brothers. Four of these accompanied their one exiled brother, Osmond, who had murdered one of Duke Robert I of Normandy's hunting companions. Sources diverge as to just who among the brothers was leader on the trip to the south:

- Orderic Vitalis and William of Jumièges name Osmond;
- Ralph Glaber names Rudolph;
- Leo of Ostia, Amatus of Montecassino, and Adhemar of Chabannes name Gilbert Buatère.

According to most south Italian sources, this last was designated leader for the Battle of Cannae in 1018. The remaining brothers were Asclettin and Ranulf, probably the younger sons. Some sources, like Glaber, claim that the band of 250 Norman warriors stopped in Rome to meet Pope Benedict VIII. They then moved on to one of the Lombard capitals: Salerno or Capua. From there they joined with Melus of Bari, the leader of the Lombard rebels in Apulia.

== Rise ==
The Drengot Normans were successful with Melus until their defeat at Cannae in 1018. After that the Emperor Henry II came down in 1022 and pacified the region, maintaining the status quo ante between Greek and Lombard, he donated to a nephew of Melus some land in the county of Comino, in the valley of the Garigliano. This nephew of Melus brought with him many of the Norman mercenaries, including the Drengots, excepting Rudolph, who returned with some men to Normandy.

The Drengots did not rise to great heights under the elder sons, Gilbert dying at Cannae and Rudolph returning to France. It was the young, but ruthless, Ranulf who brought them to great heights. He happily employed his men in support of the ousted duke of Naples, Sergius IV, in 1029. When Sergius returned to power, he gave Ranulf not only his sister in marriage, but also the town and environs of Aversa. Ranulf immediately took to fortifying the hilltop town and the first Norman state in Italy was born.

In 1042, Asclettin, who had thrown his lot in with the Hautevilles, was granted Acerenza in a twelvefold division of the conquest in Apulia.

== Rule in Capua ==
By far the most significant event in the familial history of the Drengot clan was the conquest of the principality of Capua in 1058. In 1057, Pandulf VI died and Richard, the son of Asclettin, immediately besieged the city of Capua. It surrendered the next year, but Richard, though he took the princely title, left the city in the hands of its rightful prince, Landulf VIII, until 1062.

Richard also established his suzerainty over Gaeta in 1058 and sent his son, Jordan, to take possession of the city in 1062, though this wasn't accomplished until 1064. Richard and Jordan worked to expand Drengot power to the north, in Latium and the Abruzzi. They formed the only counter to the power of the Hauteville, then conquering Calabria and Sicily. The papacy thus turned to the princes of Capua to defend them and Richard and Jordan became popemakers: they imposed, by military force, the papal candidates of Hildebrand and the Reformers. In 1077, Richard, then the equal of Robert Guiscard, began to besiege Naples, but died in 1078. Jordan did not continue the siege, but during his reign, the Drengot influence declined in proportion to that of the Hautevilles, who finished their conquests in Sicily and the expulsion of the Greeks from the peninsula. Yet Drengot rule in Capua rested on more than the succession of princes alone. Twelfth-century evidence shows that cadet branches of the family remained entrenched in counties such as Caiazzo and Carinola, while their political environment also included older Lombard comital lineages, notably the counts of Aquino.

From 1092 to 1098, the Drengots were expelled from Capua by the Lombard citizenry. After their reinstallation, the dynasty declined more and more in relative power. They still attempted to defend the papacy, but to little success. They were forced to make submission to the duke of Apulia and then the king of Sicily. Robert II of Capua revolted against the latter and spent his life trying, with the aid of Emperor and Pope, to retake his principality, but to no avail. Robert's resistance to Roger II formed part of a wider aristocratic struggle over how the old mainland principalities and counties would be subordinated and rearranged within the new Kingdom of Sicily. The eclipse of Drengot princely power did not, however, mean the immediate disappearance of the family from mainland politics. A later Drengot count, Jonathan of Carinola, was restored under Roger II and compensated with Conza, while Andrew of Rupecanina emerged in the 1150s as one of the most formidable opponents of William I of Sicily in the north-western lands of the former principality. Robert II died in 1156, but Drengot influence survived in these cadet branches and in the political afterlife of their old Capuan sphere.

== Genealogy ==
The five known brothers and their descendants:

- Gilbert Buatère (d.1018)
- Osmond
- Rudolph
- Ranulf I, count of Aversa (1030-1045)
- Asclettin, count of Acerenza
  - Asclettin, count of Aversa (1045)
  - Ranulf II
    - Richard
    - Robert, count of Alife and Caiazzo (1086-1115)
      - Ranulf III, count of Alife and Caiazzo (1108-1139) and duke of Apulia (1137-1139)
        - Robert
      - Richard, count of Rupecanina, today Raviscanina
        - Andrew, count of Rupecanina, today Raviscanina
      - Gilbert, lord of Solofra
  - Richard I, count of Aversa (1049-1078) and prince of Capua (1058-1078)
    - Jordan I, prince of Capua (1078-1090)
      - Richard II, prince of Capua (1090-1106)
      - Robert I, prince of Capua (1106-1120)
        - Richard III, prince of Capua (1120)
      - Jordan II, prince of Capua (1120-1127)
        - Robert II, prince of Capua (1127-1156)
          - Robert
          - Jordan, Byzantine sebastos
    - Jonathan, count of Carinola (d.1094)
  - Robert
    - Alexander
    - Drogo
    - Hubert

Ranulf Trincanocte, count of Aversa, was a son of a sibling of Asclettin of Acerenza. Whether this sibling was one of his known four brothers or another brother or a sister is unknown. He had a son Herman who was also count of Aversa.

== Sources ==
- European Commission presentation of The Normans Norman Heritage, 10th-12th century.
- Norwich, John Julius. The Normans in the South 1016-1130. Longmans: London, 1967.
- Norwich, John Julius. The Kingdom in the Sun 1130-1194. Longman: London, 1970.
- Chalandon, Ferdinand. Histoire de la domination normande en Italie et en Sicile. Paris, 1907.
- Fernández-Aceves, Hervin (2020). County and Nobility in Norman Italy: Aristocratic Agency in the Kingdom of Sicily, 1130–1189. London and New York: Bloomsbury Academic.
- Fernández-Aceves, Hervin (2019). "Royal comestabuli and Military Control in the Sicilian Kingdom: A Prosopographical Contribution to the Study of Italo-Norman Aristocracy". Medieval Prosopography. 34: 1–34.
