= Ostiensis =

Ostiensis (sometimes Hostiensis) is the Latin adjectival form of Ostia. It also refers to medieval Roman Catholic cardinals:

- Leo of Ostia (died c. 1116), historian
- Henry of Segusio (died 1271), canonist
- Blessed Peter Damian (died 1072), Doctor of the Church, Cardinal Bishop of Ostia
