= Battle of Rignano =

1132 battle between the forces of Roger II of Sicily and Count Ranulf of Alife

- Part of Norman conquest of southern Italy
- Southern Italy at the time of the battle
Date	30 October 1137
Location	Rignano Garganico, southern Italy 41°41′N 15°35′E
Result	Defeat of Roger II of Sicily

Belligerents
Loyal Normans	Rebel Normans

Commanders and leaders
Roger II of Sicily; Roger III, Duke of Apulia; Sergius VII of Naples †	Ranulf of Alife

Strength
Unknown	c. 1,500

Casualties and losses
c. 3,000	Unknown

The Battle of Rignano was the second great defeat of the career of Roger II of Sicily and, like the first, the Battle of Nocera, it too came at the hands of Ranulf II, Count of Alife. The prime difference was the position of the two combatants.

At Nocera on 24 July 1132, Ranulf was allied with Robert II of Capua and Sergius VII of Naples and he was a mere rebel, fighting the king of Sicily. On 30 October 1137, Ranulf was the recently appointed duke of Apulia, with a contingent of 800 German troops on loan from the Emperor Lothair II, and his adversaries were not only Roger, but his erstwhile ally Sergius.

In 1134, Roger had appointed his eldest legitimate son, Roger, duke of Apulia. Ranulf's creation as such in 1137 by the emperor and Pope Innocent II was in direct opposition to not only King Roger, but the young Duke Roger as well. Ranulf had raised an army of 800 knights of his own to augment his German forces and had infantry in proportion. He did not want a battle, but Roger and his son, with the newly submitted Sergius, marched against him. King Roger decided to attack at Rignano, the Balcone delle Puglie, where Monte Gargano drops off steeply over the Apulia plain.

The armies joined battle with the young Roger attacking successfully. He pushed Ranulf's army back along the road to Siponto. King Roger II joined in the fray at that time and his charge was, for reasons unknown, completely repulsed. He fled and soon the Norman army was in full retreat. Though both Rogers survived to make it to Salerno, Sergius lay dead on the field and Ranulf's claim to the duchy was vindicated.

The battle had, like Nocera, little lasting effect because the cities of Campania did not revolt as expected, but Ranulf was safe in Apulia until his death two years later.

The defeat in the Battle of Rignano had one positive effect for Roger. Since Duke Sergius died heirless and the Neapolitan aristocracy could not reach agreement as to whom to support for the succession, Roger took control over the Duchy of Naples, nominating his son Alfonso as the new duke.

== Sources ==
- Curtis, Edmund M.A. (1912). Roger of Sicily and the Normans in Lower Sicily. New York: G.P. Putnam's Sons.
- Falco of Benevento. Chronicon Beneventanum.
- Norwich, John Julius. The Kingdom in the Sun, 1130–1194. London: Longman, 1970.
