= Sergius VII of Naples =

Duke of Naples (died 1137)

Southern Italy in 1112 CE showing the major states and cities.

Sergius VII (died 30 October 1137) was the thirty-ninth and last duke (or magister militum) of Naples. He succeeded his father John VI on the Neapolitan throne in 1122 at a time when Roger II of Sicily was rising rapidly in power. When Roger succeeded as duke of Apulia in 1127 and was crowned king in 1130, the fate of Naples hinged on Sergius' relations with the Sicilian court.

In 1131, Roger demanded from the citizens of Amalfi the defences of their city and the keys to their castle. When the citizens refused, Sergius initially prepared to aid them with a fleet, but the Admiral George of Antioch blockaded the port city with a larger fleet and Sergius submitted to Roger. According to the chronicler Alexander of Telese, Naples "which, since Roman times, had hardly ever been conquered by the sword now submitted to Roger on the strength of a mere report." Sergius' prestige was not high and all of southern Italy was now in Roger's hands.

In 1134, Sergius supported the rebellion of Robert II of Capua and Ranulf II of Alife, but avoided any direct confrontation with Roger. After the fall of Capua, he did homage to the king. But the next year, on 24 April 1135, a Pisan fleet under the exiled Robert of Capua laid anchor in Naples. Carrying 8,000 reinforcements, the fleet increased rebel morale and soon a full-scale revolt had recommenced. Sergius had to welcome Ranulf, who was in the same position as he: in revolt against the king to whom he had so recently sworn fealty. The rebel leaders—Robert, Ranulf, and Sergius—were besieged in Naples until Spring 1136. By then, many people were dying of starvation. Yet according to the historian and rebel sympathiser Falco of Benevento, Sergius and the Neapolitans did not relent, "preferring to die of hunger than to bare their necks to the power of an evil King." The naval blockade of Naples, however, had holes and Sergius was able to slip by to Pisa for more supplies and on another occasion Robert did the same. A relief army, commanded by none other than the Emperor Lothair II himself, however, was coming to Naples' rescue and Roger lifted the siege.

Lothair left quickly after conquering nearly the whole of the Mezzogiorno, and so Roger was able to retake his lost possessions. Sergius again kneeled before him in homage, trying to spare his city another siege. Sergius was forgiven and accompanied Roger on an expedition against his erstwhile ally Ranulf, now duke of Apulia. On October 30, at the Battle of Rignano, he and Roger II, as well as Roger's son, were defeated, Sergius himself dying on the field.

Ironically enough, Roger's defeat in Rignano opened the field to his conquest of Naples itself, since Sergius VII died heirless and Naples' nobility failed to reach agreement whom should succeed him as duke. Roger finally absorbed the Duchy of Naples into his new kingdom in 1139, when the Pope Innocent II and the Neapolitan nobility acknowledged the young Alfonso of Hauteville as duke.

== Sources ==
- Norwich, John Julius. The Kingdom in the Sun 1130-1194. Longman: London, 1970.
- Alexander of Telese. The Deeds Done By King Roger of Sicily.

Preceded by John VI	Duke of Naples; 1120–1137	Vacant Title next held by Alfonso
