= Dattus =

Italian noble

Dattus (or Datto) was a Lombard leader from Bari, the brother-in-law of Melus of Bari. He joined his brother-in-law in a 1009 revolt against Byzantine authority in southern Italy.

In 1010, the rebels took Ascoli and Troia. In March 1011, the catepan Basil Mesardonites and Leo Tornikios Kontoleon, the strategos of Cephalonia, disembarked with reinforcements from Constantinople. Basil immediately besieged the rebels in Bari. The Greek citizens of the city negotiated with Basil and forced the Lombard leaders, Melus and Dattus, to flee. Basil entered the city on 11 June 1011 and reestablished Byzantine authority. He did not follow his victory up with any severe reactions. He simply sent the family of Melus, including his son Argyrus, to Constantinople.

While Melus fled to Guaimar III of Salerno, Dattus looked to the protection of the Abbey of Montecassino, where he was aided by the Latin monks, and to Pope Benedict VIII, who loaned him papal troops to garrison a tower on the Garigliano, in the territory of the Duchy of Gaeta, then ruled by the anti-Byzantine Emilia.

In 1016, Dattus rejoined Melus and his Norman mercenaries in Apulia. They were moderately successful at first, but they were defeated at Cannae (1018) and Dattus fled back to Montecassino and thence to the old tower.

In 1020, while Melus was conferencing with pope and the German king in Bamberg, the new catepan, Basil Boioannes, and his new ally, Pandulf IV of Capua, marched on the tower and took it. At Bari on 15 June 1021, Dattus was tied up in a sack with a monkey, a rooster, and a snake and tossed into the sea (the so-called mazzeratura, similar to the ancient Roma Poena cullei). The atrocity prompted a quick Western response; a huge army under the Emperor Henry II marched south to besiege the new fortress of Troia.

== Sources ==
- Norwich, John Julius. The Normans in the South 1016-1130. Longmans: London, 1967.
- Amatus of Montecassino. History of the Normans Book I. Translated by Prescott N. Dunbar. Boydell, 2004. ISBN 1-84383-078-7
