= Robert of Caiazzo =

Italian nobleman

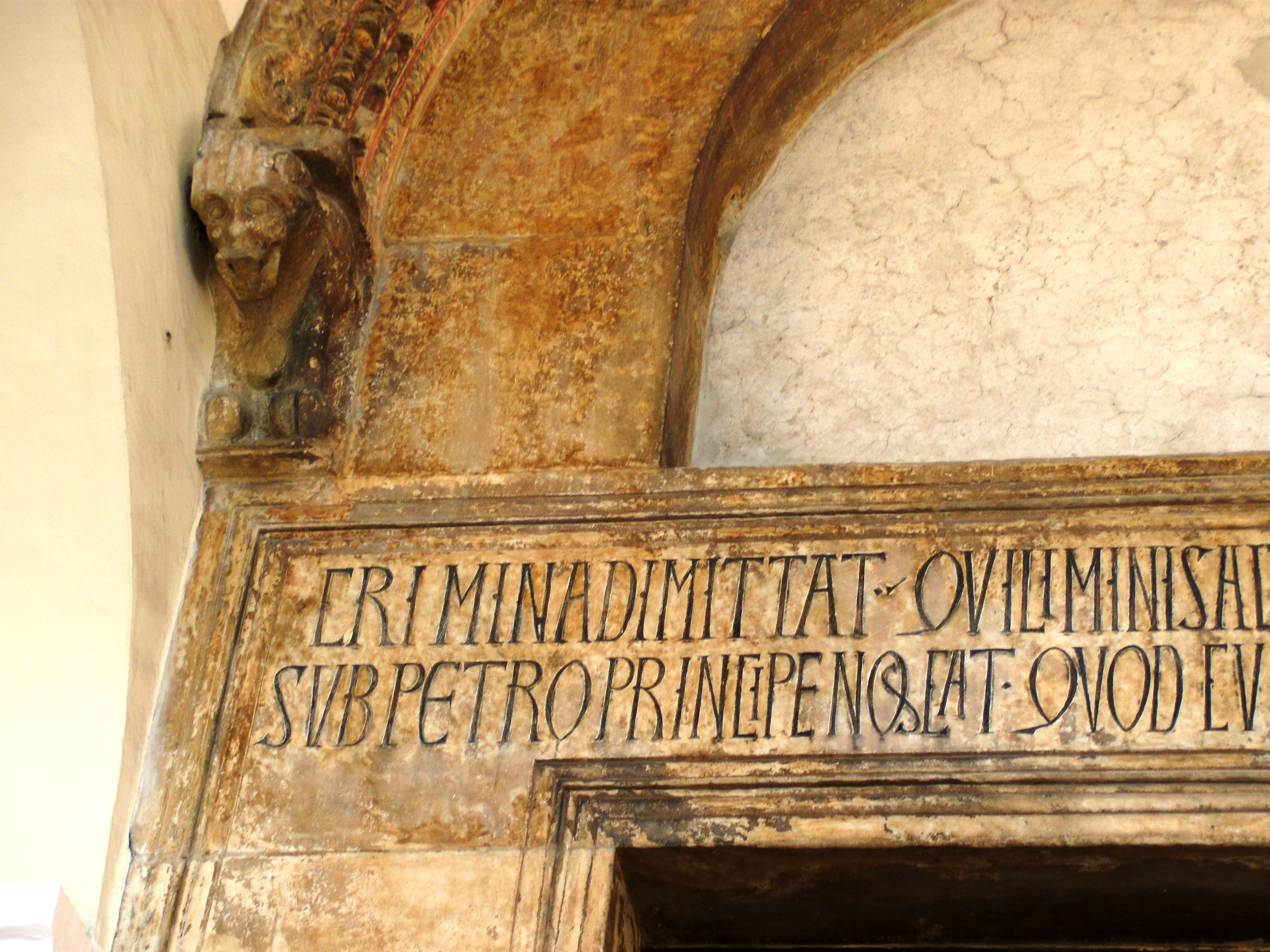
Detail of the lintel of the original doorway of Robert's foundation of San Mennato in Sant'Agata.

Robert (died 1116) was a south Italian nobleman who ruled the counties of Airola, Alife, Caiazzo, Sant'Agata and Telese from 1088 until his death. He was the regent of Capua in 1090–93, and was effectively independent of any lord after 1105. He was a major patron of churches and abbeys, and also commissioned several books.

== Family ==
Born in southern Italy, Robert belonged to the second generation of the Italo-Norman nobility. He belonged to a cadet branch of the Drengot family; the senior line had ruled the Principality of Capua since 1058. Robert's father, Rainulf I, received several counties in the north of the principality from his cousin, Prince Jordan I, in 1078. These counties had been confiscated from their Lombard rulers following a major revolt against Norman rule in 1063–65. In a charter of 4 July 1066, Jordan I and his father, Richard I, refer to the "treason of the counts of Caiazzo" to justify the redistribution of confiscated lands. The last Lombard count known by name was Peter, and either he or his son lost the county in 1065 or early 1066. Robert succeeded to all his father's counties after Rainulf's death in 1088. In his own documents, Robert did not list all the counties he held, preferring an open-ended style: "Robert, count of Alife, Caiazzo, Sant'Agata and many others".

Robert's wife was Gaitelgrima. They had two sons—Rainulf II and Richard—and a daughter, named Gaitelgrima after her mother. The daughter married Duke William II of Apulia in 1114. They had no children; she was still living when William died in 1127. Robert had an illegitimate son named Bansolino and probably at least one other son named Alexander. He was succeeded on his death by his son Rainulf.

== Capuan politics ==
When Prince Jordan died in 1090, he was succeeded by a minor, Prince Richard II. Robert became Richard's guardian until he came of age in 1093. In 1092, under the leadership of Lando, one of the counts of Teano, the city of Capua rebelled against Prince Richard In early 1093 Richard, still under the guardianship of Robert, managed to briefly recover Capua, although he would not definitively recover it until a successful siege in 1098. During the brief recovery of Capua, on 27 January 1093 Robert, described as Richard's magister (master), "persuaded" the prince to make a donation to the abbey of Sant'Angelo in Formis.

After Richard attained his majority, Robert's relationship with his nominal overlord weakened. He apparently possessed his own court, complete with a scriptorium, and his charters mimicked the style of princely charters, but making no reference to the princely regnal years by which the charters of the prince's subjects were normally dated. The last charter in which Robert explicitly recognised Richard's lordship is dated 1105, at which time they were on a joint military campaign in the north of the principality. After this isolated instance of a pragmatic acknowledgement on Robert's part, the count of Caiazzo was de facto independent of Capuan authority. In 1105 he even described himself as "count of Caiazzo and many other [places] by the favour of divine power", a locution (cf. Dei gratia rex) usually reserved for sovereigns.

In 1103, Guillaume de Blosseville usurped the Duchy of Gaeta and expelled its duke, Gualganus Ridellus. Gualganus, who was married to Robert's sister, retreated to his county of Pontecorvo. He died shortly after, leaving Pontecorvo to his widow. She was soon accused of conspiring with the enemies of the prince of Capua and Prince Richard confiscated her county and bestowed it on her brother. On 13 January 1105, Robert gave Pontecorvo to the Abbey of Monte Cassino, partly as a gift and partly as a sale, the money to be used as a dowry for his niece. On 25 January, Prince Richard confirmed the gift and sale. Shortly afterwards, both Robert and Richard swore oaths before Abbot Oderisius I to defend Pontecorvo from the abbey's enemies.

== Church patronage ==
Robert's counties lay close by the Abbey of Monte Cassino and its extensive landed estates, the so-called "land of Saint Benedict" or terra Sancti Benedicti. He was a major benefactor of Monte Cassino throughout his career. In December 1094 he donated the monastery of Santa Maria in Cingla to Monte Cassino. This precipitated a major feud between Monte Cassino and the nuns of Santa Maria de Capua, who had formerly held authority over Cingla. Gemma, abbess of Santa Maria de Capua, was a daughter of Peter, the former Lombard count of Caiazzo, and it was either her father or brother who had been deposed from Caiazzo on allegations of treachery in or around 1066. For Gemma, the offensiveness of having one of her churches confiscated by the Norman count of Caiazzo, was probably personal. In Robert's words, he did it "for the health of my soul and good memory of my father, Count Ranulf, and all my relatives" after hearing that the monastery in Cingla was "for a long time ... devastated and dissipated by bad men and the service of God too carelessly performed there". The donation—or transfer of authority from Santa Maria de Capua to Monte Cassino—was confirmed by Popes Urban II and Paschal II before being reversed by Robert's son, Rainulf, at the insistence of Abbess Alferada II of Santa Maria de Capua.

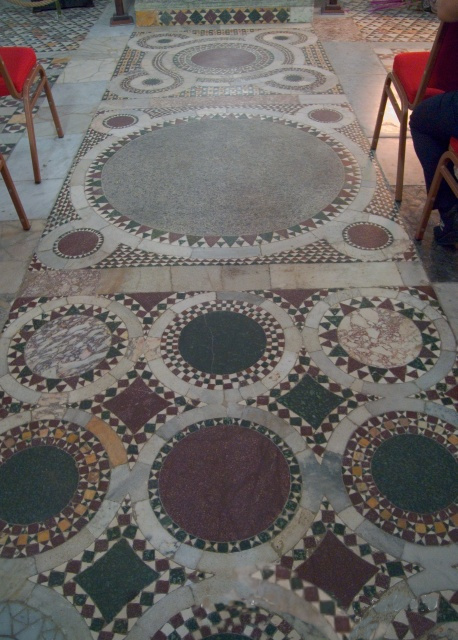
Cosmatesque flooring in San Mennato

Shortly after donating the monastery of Cingla to Monte Cassino, Robert swore to be faithful to Abbot Oderisius and pledged to defend the terra Sancti Benedicti against all opponents save his lords, Prince Richard and Count Hugh of Molise.

In 1092, Robert interceded with Prince Richard on behalf of Abbot Guarin of Saint Lawrence in Aversa. Saint Lawrence was one of the few monasteries in southern Italy founded by the Normans. In 1106, Robert convinced Bishop Peter of Caiazzo to grant a monastery in his diocese to Saint Lawrence.

During Robert's rule, the relics of an old local saint-hermit, Mennas, were rediscovered on Monte Pentime near Vitulano. In 1094, Robert had them translated from the site of the old hermitage to the cathedral of Caiazzo. He commissioned the abbot of Monte Cassino, Oderisius I, to prepare a biography of Menna and an account of the translation of his relics. Oderisius gave the task to his librarian, Leo of Ostia, who reworked the Vita Sancti Mennatis of Gregory the Great and added his own Translatio to it. Since Pentime lay within the archdiocese of Benevento, Archbishop Roffred I disputed the right of the bishop of Caiazzo, a suffragan of the archdiocese of Capua, to possess Mennas' relics. Robert resolved this dispute in his own favour by founding a monastery dedicated to Saint Mennas in Sant'Agata. Built between 1102 and 1107, the building was modelled after the new basilica of Monte Cassino. (Robert's father had been present at the dedication of the new basilica in 1071.) The monastery has cosmatesque flooring in imitation of that of Monte Cassino, which Robert had presumably specifically requested. The inscription on the lintel of the doorway reads:

Crimina dimittat, qui liminis alta subintrat.
Templum, si poscat, / sub Petro principe noscat,
quod cum fundasti, Rotberte comes, decorasi.

Let him cast off his sins who crosses this lofty threshold.
If he ask, let him know that when under the protection of Peter, prince [of the Apostles],
you, Count Robert, founded the church, you adorned it.

This new monastery was formally dedicated by Paschal II on 4 September 1110. Robert gave the monastery to the Roman church in perpetuity without conditions. He also commissioned Leo to write an account of the second translation of the relics of Mennas in 1107. Leo also wrote a Miracula, an account of the miracles performed by Mennas and witnessed by visitors to his shrine. Leo's accounts are all highly flattering of Robert. He is portrayed as deeply concerned to obtain relics for the new cathedral at Caiazzo prior to the discovery (inventio) of Mennas' relics. He also claimed to have been healed of some illness by the saint's intervention after the second translation of the relics, and in gratitude he attended a celebratory feast on the saint's day. Leo notes that while Robert could have had the books he wanted prepared "in his own court" (in curia sua), implying that he had a scriptorium and employed skilled scribes, he preferred to commission Monte Cassino because of his piety.

== Sources ==
- Bloch, Herbert (1986). Monte Cassino in the Middle Ages. Volume I (Parts I–III). Cambridge, MA: Harvard University Press.
- Bottiglieri, Corinna (2013). "Literary Themes and Genres in Southern Italy during the Norman Age: The Return of the Saints". In Burkhardt, Stefan; Foerster, Thomas (eds.). Norman Tradition and Transcultural Heritage: Exchange of Cultures in the 'Norman' Peripheries of Medieval Europe. Ashgate. pp. 97–124.
- Gambella, Angelo (2007). Medioevo Alifano: Potere e Popolo nello Stato Normanno di Alife. Studi Storici sul Medioevo Italiano. Rome: Drengo.
- Gloria, Andrea (1870). Compendio delle lezioni teorico-pratiche di paleografia e diplomatica. Padua: Pietro Prosperini.
- Houben, Hubert (2002). Roger II of Sicily: A Ruler Between East and West. Cambridge: Cambridge University Press.
- Loud, G. A. (1981a). "A Calendar of the Diplomas of the Norman Princes of Capua". Papers of the British School at Rome. 49: 99–143. doi:10.1017/S0068246200008503. S2CID 163066985.
- Loud, G. A. (1981b). "The Norman Counts of Caiazzo and the Abbey of Montecassino". Monastica: Scritti raccolti in memoria del xv centenario della nascità di S. Benedetto (480–1980), vol. I. Miscellanea Cassinese. Vol. 44. pp. 199–217.
- Loud, G. A. (2004). "Southern Italy in the Eleventh Century". In Luscombe, David; Riley-Smith, Jonathan (eds.). The New Cambridge Medieval History, Volume 4: c. 1024–c. 1198 (Part II). Cambridge: Cambridge University Press. pp. 94–119.
- Loud, G. A. (2007). The Latin Church in Norman Italy. Cambridge: Cambridge University Press.
- Loud, G. A. (2013) [2000]. The Age of Robert Guiscard: Southern Italy and the Northern Conquest. Oxford: Routledge.
- Oldfield, Paul (2014). Sanctity and Pilgrimage in Medieval Southern Italy, 1000–1200. Cambridge: Cambridge University Press.
- Takayama, Hiroshi (1993). The Administration of the Norman Kingdom of Sicily. Leiden: E. J. Brill.
- Tescione, Giuseppe (1975). "Roberto Conte normanno di Alife, Caiazzo e S. Agata dei Goti". Archivio Storico di Terra di Lavoro. 4: 9–52.
