= Rainulf Drengot =

11th-century Norman mercenary in Italy

Rainulf Drengot (also Ranulph, Ranulf, or Rannulf; c. 990 – June 1045) was a Norman adventurer and mercenary in southern Italy. In 1030 he became the first count of Aversa. He was a member of the Drengot family. The name Drengot is probably derived from old Norse *drengr ("a valiant, chivalrous man"; "one who is bold, or inexperienced; a lad, a boy"), cognate with Old English *dreng (“warrior; soldier”).

== Early life and arrival in Italy ==
Italy in 1000 AD, prior to Rainulf's arrival in southern Italy

When Rainulf was exiled by Richard II of Normandy for a violent criminal act, Rainulf, Osmond, and their brothers Gilbert Buatère, Asclettin (later count of Acerenza), and Raulf went on a pilgrimage to the shrine of the soldier-archangel, Michael, at Monte Sant'Angelo sul Gargano in the Byzantine Catepanate of Italy. They brought with them a band of 250 warriors, formed of other exiles, landless cadets and similar adventurers.

== Mercenary service ==
In 1017 they arrived in the Mezzogiorno, which was in a state of virtual anarchy. Establishing a stronghold at Monte Gargano in Apulia, they joined forces with the Lombard Melus of Bari, who had rebelled against his Byzantine overlords but who was currently on the run. Their first major engagement with the army of the Byzantine catepan Basil Boioannes, fought at the Battle of Cannae, an ancient Apulian villa, was a disaster for the Normans and ended in defeat. They were decimated and their leader, Rainulf's brother Gilbert, was killed. Rainulf, who now came to the fore as the undisputed leader, withdrew with the remnants of the band from Apulia to Campania, where, according to Amatus of Montecassino, though surrounded by enemies they were able to take advantage of dissension among the undisciplined Lombard lords.

They took to protecting, at a price, bands of pilgrims headed for the shrine of St Michael from the depredations of other marauders. Rainulf also served the Lombard Pandulf IV of Capua. "Under his protection," Amatus reports, "they hastened to plunder the neighboring places and to harass his enemies. But since human thoughts are inclined to greed and money always triumphs in the end, from time to time they abandoned him... They sold their services as they could, according to circumstances, offering most to him who gave most." Soon the balance of power in Lombard Campania lay in Norman hands: "For the Normans never desired any of the Lombards to win a decisive victory, in case this should be to their disadvantage. But now supporting the one and then aiding the other, they prevented anyone being completely ruined."

Norman reinforcements and local miscreants, who found a welcome in Rainulf's encampment with no questions asked, swelled the numbers at Rainulf's command. Their Norman language and Norman customs welded a disparate group into the semblance of a nation, as Amatus observed.

== Mercenary to Count ==
Rainulf eventually switched his allegiance to Sergius IV of Naples, with whom he achieved some success. In 1030, Duke Sergius gave him the former Byzantine stronghold of Aversa north of Naples, with the title of count and his sister in marriage. In 1034, this first wife died, and Rainulf married the daughter of the duke of Amalfi, who was also the niece of Sergius' inveterate enemy, Pandulf IV of Capua; He expanded his territory at the expense of the abbey of Montecassino. His title to Aversa was recognised in 1037 by Emperor Conrad II. After vanquishing the Byzantines in battle in 1038, he declared himself prince, formalizing his independence from Naples and from his former Lombard allies. He conquered his neighbour Pandulf's principality, and Conrad approved the union of the two domains, which formed the largest polity in southern Italy. In 1039, he was at the side of Guaimar IV of Salerno and the emperor Conrad.

Ranulf was one of the leaders of the anti-Byzantine coalition which rebelled in southern Italy in 1040. He took part in the decisive victory at the battle of Olivento in March 1041. In 1042, after the victory of his Norman ally William Iron Arm, he received, from the erstwhile Byzantine territories, suzerainty over Siponto and Monte Gargano. He died in June 1045 and was succeeded by his nephew, Asclettin, son of Asclettin of Acerenza.

The historians Amatus of Montecassino and William of Apulia are the main contemporary sources for the career of Rainulf.

== See also ==
- Norman conquest of southern Italy
- Drengot family

== Notes ==
Preceded by none	Count of Aversa; 1030–1045	Succeeded by Asclettin
