= Ranulf I of Caiazzo =

Count of Caiazzo (died 1088)

Ranulf I (also spelled Rainulf or Raynulf; died 1088) was the count of Caiazzo in the Principality of Capua from about 1078. He also brought the formerly Lombard counties of Alife, Telese and Sant'Agata dei Goti and the castles of Airola and Tocco Caudio under his control, dominating the region between Capua and Benevento (a Papal fief). He passed this territorial lordship on intact to his heirs, and it remained in their possession until the death of his grandson and namesake, Ranulf II, in 1139.

Ranulf I was the youngest son of Count Asclettin of Acerenza, of the Drengot family of the Norman nobility. At the invitation of Abbot Desiderius, Ranulf was present at the dedication service of the new basilica of the Abbey of Monte Cassino on 1 October 1071. That same year, he assisted his nephew, Jordan, in a short-lived rebellion against the latter's father—Ranulf's brother—Prince Richard I of Capua. His loyalty to his nephew was rewarded when the latter succeeded Richard in 1078. Jordan granted Ranulf the old Lombard county of Caiazzo. Ranulf also accompanied Jordan on a diplomatic journey to Rome in 1078, where both nephew and uncle were reconciled with Pope Gregory VII for past encroachments on Papal territory and the ban of excommunication on them was lifted. After the death of Pope Gregory in 1085, when the lands of Monte Cassino were threatened, Desiderius called on Ranulf to defend them.

In 1078–79, Ranulf and Prince Jordan lent their support to a rebellion against Duke Robert Guiscard in the Duchy of Apulia. The rebels included Counts Peter II of Trani, Henry of Monte Sant'Angelo and Amico II of Giovinazzo, as well as four of Robert's nephews—Abelard, Herman, Count Geoffrey of Conversano and Count Robert of Montescaglioso—and the noblemen Gradilon and Baldwin. After defeating Abelard, Gradilon and Baldwin, Robert went to Salerno in July 1079, and then to Sarno, where he made peace with Prince Jordan and Count Ranulf. With the loss of Capuan support, the rebellion collapsed.

Ranulf's wife was Sibilla, and together they made donations to the monastery of San Gabriele in Airola. These were confirmed to Abbot Aganus by Pope Paschal II on 25 September 1108. They had one daughter, who married Duke Gualganus of Gaeta, and two sons: Robert (floruit 1086–1116), who succeeded to Ranulf's counties, and Richard (fl. 1072–96). Ranulf died in 1088. (Note: Loud implies that he may have died in 1087 or 1089. He was certainly dead by 1089, when Baldwin, lord of Ponte di Santa Anastasia and one of Ranulf's vassals, invoked "Count Ranulf of good memory" (bone memorie Raynulfi comitis) in a charter.)

== Sources ==
- Bloch, Herbert (1986). Monte Cassino in the Middle Ages. Volume I (Parts I–III). Cambridge, MA: Harvard University Press.
- Chalandon, Ferdinand (1907). Histoire de la domination normande en Italie et en Sicile. 2 vols. Paris: A. Picard et fils.
- Gambella, Angelo (2007). Medioevo Alifano: Potere e Popolo nello Stato Normanno di Alife. Studi Storici sul Medioevo Italiano. Rome: Drengo.
- Loud, G. A. (1981). "The Norman Counts of Caiazzo and the Abbey of Montecassino". Monastica: Scritti raccolti in memoria del xv centenario della nascità di S. Benedetto (480–1980), vol. I. Miscellanea Cassinese. Vol. 44. pp. 199–217.
- Loud, G. A. (2013) [2000]. The Age of Robert Guiscard: Southern Italy and the Northern Conquest. Oxford: Routledge.
- Poso, Cosimo Damiano (2001). "Goffredo". Dizionario Biografico degli Italiani. Vol. 57. Rome: Istituto dell'Enciclopedia Italiana.
- Takayama, Hiroshi (1993). The Administration of the Norman Kingdom of Sicily. Leiden: E. J. Brill.
- Tescione, G. (1975). "Roberto Conte normanno di Alife, Caiazzo e S. Agata dei Goti". Archivio Storico di Terra di Lavoro. 4: 9–52.
