= Basil Mesardonites =

Catapan of Italy from 1010 to 1016/1017

Basil Mesardonites (Greek: Βασίλειος Μεσαρντονίτης, died 1016) was the Catapan of Italy, representing the Byzantine Emperor there, from 1010 to 1016 or 1017. He succeeded the catapan John Kourkouas, who died fighting the Lombards, then in rebellion under Melus, early in 1010. In March, Basil disembarked with reinforcements from Constantinople and Leo Tornikios Kontoleon, the strategos of Cephalonia. Basil immediately besieged the rebels in Bari. The Greek citizens of the city negotiated with Basil and forced the Lombard leaders, Melus and Dattus, to flee. Basil entered the city on June 11, 1011 and reestablished Byzantine authority. He did not follow his victory up with any severe reactions. He simply sent the family of Melus, including his son Argyrus, to Constantinople. Basil's next move was to ally to the Roman Empire as many Lombard principalities as possible. He visited Salerno in October, where Prince Guaimar III was nominally a Byzantine vassal. He then moved on to Monte Cassino, which monastery was sheltering Dattus on its lands. Basil nevertheless confirmed all the privileges of the monastery over its property in Greek territory. The abbot, Atenulf, was a brother of the prince of Capua, Pandulf IV. The monastery then promptly expelled Dattus and he fled to papal territory. Basil held the Greek catapanate in peace until his death in 1016, or, according to Lupus Protospatharius, 1017. He was replaced by the aforementioned strategos of Cephalonia, Leo.

Modern scholars such as Guilou and Vannier identify Basil Mesardonites with Basil, a member of the Argyros family and a brother of the future emperor Romanos III, who is reported by the chronicler John Skylitzes to have also been active against Melus's rebels.

== Sources ==
- Norwich, John Julius. The Normans in the South 1016–1130. Longmans: London, 1967.
- Chalandon, Ferdinand. Histoire de la domination normande en Italie et en Sicile. Paris, 1907.

Preceded by John Curcuas	Catepan of Italy; 1010 – 1016 or 1017	Succeeded by Leo Tornikios Kontoleon
