= Val di Crati =

The Val di Crati was an administrative region in the Kingdom of Sicily. It was the territory originally conquered by Robert Guiscard in the 1050s. At that time, its population was a mix of Greek and Lombard (Latin) Christians. Under the Hohenstaufen and Angevin kings, the Val di Crati became closely associated with the terra iordanis, the land of Jordan (died 1092), son of Roger I. The terra iordanis retained its distinct identity into the 13th century.

In 1145, the first Cistercian monastery in southern Italy, Santa Maria della Sambucina, was founded in the Val di Crati. In 1150, Roger II issued a new law (novella) for Calabria and the Val di Crati, instructing judges on how to divide property among heirs. It had its own justiciar in 1150 and its own chamberlain (camerarius).

== Sources ==
- Matthew, Donald. The Norman Kingdom of Sicily. Cambridge, 1992.
- Loud, G. A. The Latin Church in Norman Italy. Cambridge, 2007.
