= Gilbert Buatère =

11th-century Norman adventurer

Gilbert Buatère (c. 985 – 1 October 1018) was one of the first Norman adventurers in the Mezzogiorno. He was the eldest son of a petty, but rich, lord of Carreaux, near Avesnes-en-Bray in the region of Rouen. Carreaux gives his family, the Drengot, the alternate name of de Quarrel.

In 1016, his brother Osmond, according to some sources, or Gilbert himself, according to others, killed one William Repostel, a relative of Duke Richard II of Normandy in revenge and the duke pardoned his life, but exiled him. Osmond and his four brothers—Gilbert, Asclettin, Ralph, and Ranulf—travelled to the Mediterranean to assist Melus of Bari and Guaimar III of Salerno, Lombards in revolt against Byzantine control. In 1018, 250 Norman knights under Gilbert's command fought against the Greek general Basil Boioannes in the Battle of Cannae, a grave Norman defeat. Gilbert himself, along with Osmond, died in the battle: only ten knights survived.

== Sources ==
- Joranson, Einar (July 1948). "The Inception of the Career of the Normans in Italy -- Legend and History". Speculum. 23 (3): 353–396. doi:10.2307/2848427. JSTOR 2848427.
- Norwich, John Julius (1992). The Normans in the South 1016-1130. London: Penguin. ISBN 9780140152128.
