= Peter the Deacon =

12th-century Italian monk, librarian and chronicler

Dom Peter the Deacon OSB
- Peter the Deacon
- Title: Deacon

Personal life
- Born: 1107 Rome, Papal States
- Died: 1159 (aged 51–52) Monte Cassino, Terra Sancti Benedicti
- Parent: Egidio (father)
- Occupation: Librarian, archivist

Religious life
- Religion: Roman Catholicism
- Order: Benedictines
- Ordination: 1115

Peter the Deacon (Note: French: Pierre le Diacre, Latin: Petrus Diaconus) OSB (fl. 1115–1159) was the librarian of the abbey of Montecassino and continuator of the Chronicon monasterii Casinensis, usually called the Monte Cassino Chronicle in English. The chronicle was originally written by Leo of Ostia. According to both Chalandon and Lord Norwich, Peter is a poor historian and writer, much inferior to Leo.

== Biography ==
Reputedly a descendant of the Counts of Tusculum, he was offered in 1115 to the monastery of Monte Cassino. About 1127 he was forced to leave the abbey and retired to the neighbouring Atina (Atina, Lazio), because he had supported Abbot Oderisius, who had been deposed by Pope Honorius II. In 1131, after Honorius's death, he returned to the abbey. In 1137, he appeared before Emperor Lothair II, then in Italy, on behalf of his monastery. Lothair was so pleased with him that he appointed him his chaplain and secretary, and would probably have detained him permanently in his service had Abbot Wibald not recalled Peter to Monte Cassino.

In 1131 on his return to the abbey Peter became librarian and keeper of the archives there.

After a long period during which historical sources report nothing about him, his name, Petrus Egidii Tusculanensis, last appears in an act of donation of 1154. His death must have taken place after 1159, the initial deadline for the dating of the codex Casinense 47, in whose obituary on February 26 his name is marked (Petrus diaconus et monacus), the only one, among those of many deacons of the same name commemorated there, the mention written in capital letters.

== Works ==
The 1913 Catholic Encyclopedia describes Peter as "vain and occasionally untruthful, but an entertaining writer". His works, enumerated in Patrologia Latina, CLXXIII, 763-1144, include a cartulary of the abbey archives (Registrum Petri Diaconi) and several historical works:

- De viris illustribus Casinensibus;
- De ortu et obitu justorum Casinensium;
- De locis sanctis;
- Disciplina Casinensis;
- Rhythmus de novissimis diebus.

Peter edited the existing chronicle of Monte Cassino, introducing many falsehoods. He also forged, under the name of Gordian, the Passion of St. Placidus.

== Sources ==
- Leo of Ostia. Chronicon Monasterii Casinensis.
- Chalandon, Ferdinand. Histoire de la domination normande en Italie et en Sicilie. Paris, 1906.
- Norwich, John Julius. The Normans in the South 1016-1130. Longmans: London, 1967.
- Dell'Omo, Mariano (2015). "PIETRO Diacono". Dizionario Biografico degli Italiani (in Italian). Vol. 83: Piacentini–Pio V. Rome: Institute of the Italian Encyclopaedia. ISBN 978-88-12-00032-6.
