= Guaimar III of Salerno =

Lombard prince of Salerno

Guaimar III (also Waimar, Gaimar, Guaimaro, or Guaimario and sometimes numbered Guaimar IV) (c. 983 – 1027×31) was the Lombard prince of Salerno from around 994 to his death. Under his reign, Salerno entered an era of great splendour. Opulenta Salernum was the inscription on his coins. He made Amalfi, Gaeta and Sorrento his vassals and annexed much of Byzantine Apulia and Calabria.

He was the second eldest son of Prince John II of Salerno. The eldest was Guy, who ruled as co-ruler with his father from January 984 to 988. Sometime between January and March 989, John made Guaimar co-regent. In 994 (also given as 998 or 999), his father died and he became sole ruler.

In 999, a band of Norman pilgrims returning from Jerusalem stopped at the port of Salerno. While they were staying there, the city was attacked by Saracen pirates. The Salernitans were afraid to offer battle, but the Normans were not. Soon their bravery drew out the Salernitans and together they routed the Muslim force. Guaimar promptly offered the Normans numerous incentives to stay, but to no avail. Before they left, however, the Normans promised to spread the word about the need for fighting men in the south.

As a member of the independent Lombard leadership of the Mezzogiorno, Guaimar supported the Lombard rebel Melus of Bari. After Melus's defeat in 1011, Guaimar was paid a visit by the victorious Byzantine catapan, Basil Mesardonites, in October. Later, he sheltered Melus. Guaimar was nominally a vassal of Holy Roman Emperor Henry II, but after the defeat at Cannae in 1018, he discreetly transferred his allegiance to the Byzantine Emperor Basil II. When Henry died in 1024, Guaimar sent an embassy to the new emperor, Conrad II, to plead for the release of his brother-in-law Pandulf IV of Capua, the Wolf of the Abruzzi. Conrad naively complied. Upon his return, Pandulf immediately put his old capital, Capua, under siege, an endeavour in which he had the support of Guaimar and his Normans under Ranulf Drengot and the catepan of Italy, Boioannes.

In 1015, Guaimar made his eldest son by his first wife, Porpora of Tabellaria (d.c.1010), co-prince as John III. In 1018, however, John died. Guaimar then made co-prince his eldest son by his second wife, Gaitelgrima, the sister of Pandulf. It was this son, also named Guaimar, who succeeded him in 1027 at the age of fourteen or sixteen under the regency of Gaitelgrima, who was basically the pawn of her brother Pandulf. Guaimar III's second son, Guy, was made gastald of Capua by his uncle and later duke of Sorrento by his elder brother. His third son, Pandulf, became lord of Capaccio (his daughter Theodora became the second wife of Geoffrey of Hauteville). He had a daughter (probably about 1026) named Gaitelgrima, who married successively the brothers Drogo and Humphrey, counts of Apulia.

Regnal titles
Preceded by John II	Prince of Salerno; 994–1027	Succeeded by Guaimar IV
