= Alexander of Telese =

12th-century Italian chronicler

Alexander of Telese (Italian: Alessandro Telesino) was an Italian chronicler and historian, and the abbot of San Salvatore, near Telese, in southern Italy from before 1127 to before November 1143.

His most famous work is The Deeds Done by King Roger of Sicily (Gesta Rogeri), a largely biographical work covering the reign of Roger II of Sicily. This work was written at the request and with the patronage of Matilda, a half-sister of Roger and, from 1131, estranged wife of Ranulf II, Count of Alife. It covers only the years after 1127 in detail, ending abruptly in 1136. Though written for the sister of Roger and wife of his chiefest enemy, it was definitely sympathetic to Roger. There is a clear contrast with the chronicle of his contemporary Falco of Benevento, who opposed Roger in everything.

== Sources ==
- Norwich, John Julius. The Normans in the South 1016-1130. Longmans: London, 1967.
- Norwich, John Julius. The Kingdom in the Sun 1130-1194. Longman: London, 1970.
- Alexander of Telese, translated by G. A. Loud. The Deeds Done by Roger of Sicily. Introduction and Books One, Two, Three, and Four
- Percy (Strerath), Sandra. Les liens d'homme à homme dans l'entourage du roi Roger de Sicile d'après l'«Ystoria Rogerii Regis Sicilie Calabrie atque Apulie d'Alexandre de Telese» / Interpersonal relationships in the entourage of the King of Sicily, according to the Ystoria Rogerii Regis Sicilie Calabrie atque Apulie of Alexander of Telese. MA Thesis (Supervising teacher: Mme le Professeur Huguette Taviani-Carozzi). Université de Provence. 2002
