= Asclettin, Count of Acerenza =

Asclettin or Asketil was the first count of Acerenza, one of the twelve leaders of the Norman mercenaries of Guaimar IV of Salerno who conquered much of Apulia between 1038 and 1042. In the latter year, the division of the conquests twelvefold was made and Asclettin received his portion.

Asclettin arrived in 1016 with his older brothers Osmond and Gilbert. He was a member of the Drengot family and his brother Rainulf Drengot was the first Norman to hold any land in the south: he was the first count of Aversa. Rainulf was succeeded by Asclettin's son and namesake, Asclettin. Asclettin was also the father of Prince Richard I of Capua and Count Ranulf I of Caiazzo.
