= Leo of Ostia =

Catholic cardinal (1046–1115/7)

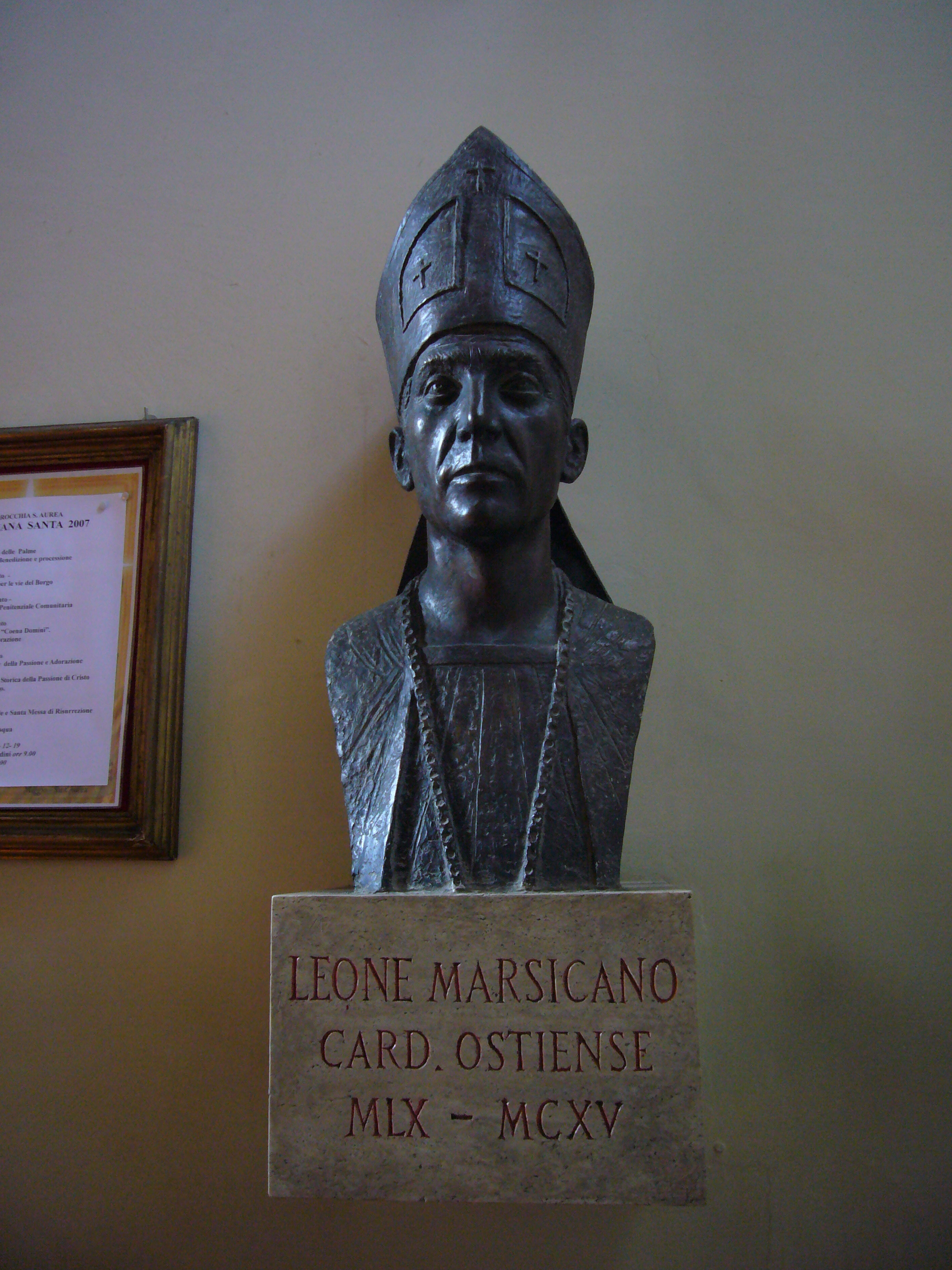
Modern bust of Leo

Leo Marsicanus (meaning "of the Marsi") or Ostiensis (meaning "of Ostia"), also known as Leone dei Conti di Marsi (1046, Marsica – 1115/7, Ostia), was a nobleman and monk of Monte Cassino around 1061 and Italian cardinal from the 12th century.

In Monte Cassino, he became a friend of Desiderius of Benevento, later Pope Victor III, and it was to him that Leo dedicated his most famous work as an historian and chronicler, being a librarian: the Chronica Monasterii Casinensis. The chronicler depends largely on Amatus' earlier work, but also on oral traditions and other archives. Leo finished it at 1075; it is continued by other monastic librarian Peter the Deacon.

Pope Urban II created him cardinal deacon in 1088 with the deaconry of Ss. Vito e Modesto. In 1101, Pope Paschal II promoted him cardinal-bishop of Ostia. In 1105, he was appointed cardinal - bishop of Velletri until his death.
