= Melus of Bari =

10/11th-century Lombard nobleman

Melus
- Duke of Apulia
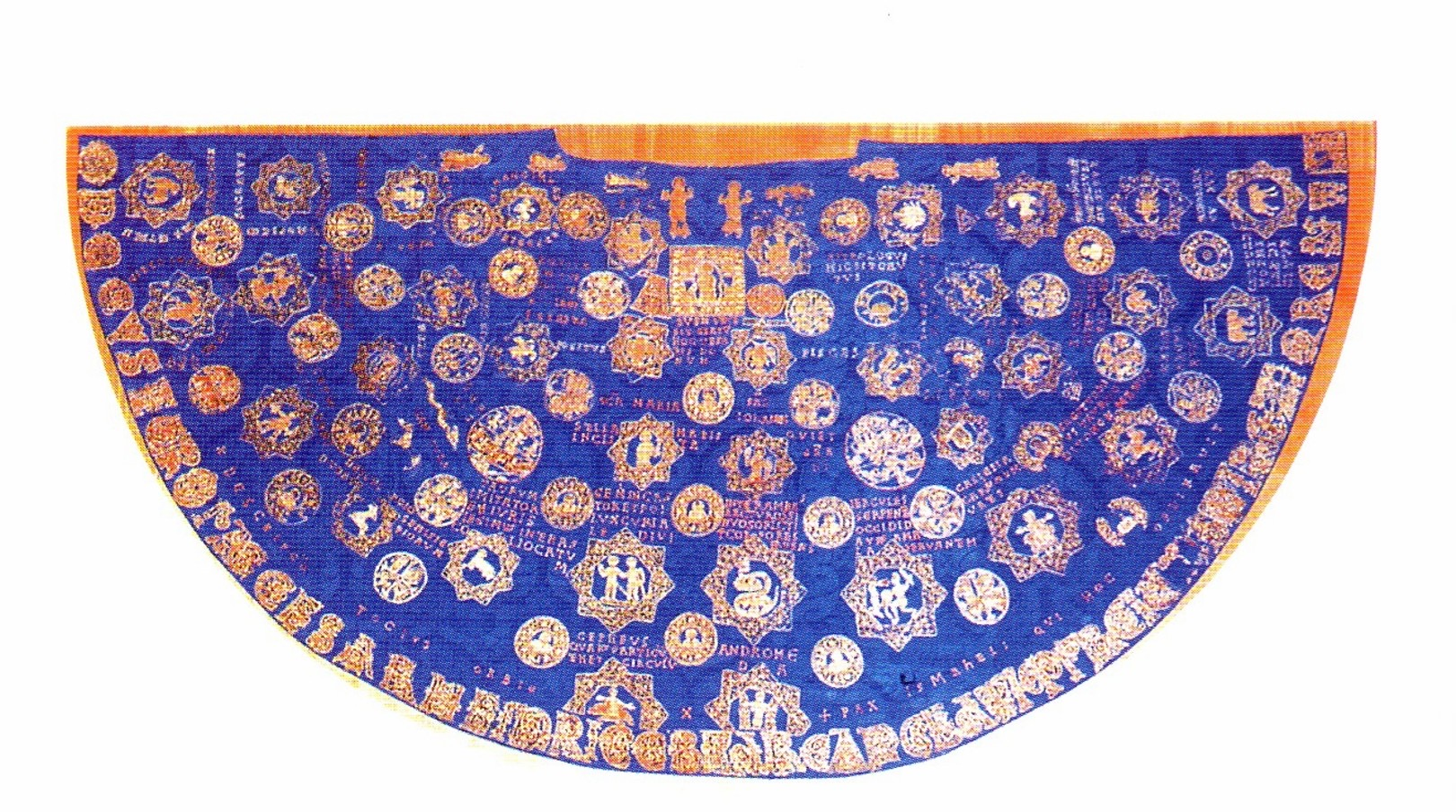
- Cape given to Holy Roman Emperor Henry II by Melus

Duke of Apulia
- Reign: 1015-1020
- Predecessor: title created
- Successor: title vacant Next Duke of Apulia: Guaimar IV of Salerno
- Died: 1020
- Spouse: Maralda
- Issue: Argyrus

Melus (also Milus or Meles, Melo in Italian) (died 1020) was a Lombard nobleman from the Apulian town of Bari, whose ambition to carve for himself an autonomous territory from the Byzantine catapanate of Italy in the early eleventh century inadvertently sparked the Norman presence in Southern Italy. He was the first Duke of Apulia.

== Biography ==
Melus and his brother-in-law Dattus rebelled in 1009 and quickly took Bari itself. In 1010, they took Ascoli and Troia, but the new catapan, Basil Mesardonites, gathered a large army, and on 11 June 1011 Bari fell. Melus fled to the protection of Prince Guaimar III of Salerno and Dattus to the Benedictine abbey of Montecassino, where the anti-Greek monks, at the insistence of Pope Benedict VIII, gave him a fortified tower on the Garigliano. Melus' family, however, were captured and carted off to Constantinople.

In 1016, according to the Norman chronicler William of Apulia, Melus went to the Shrine of Saint Michael at Monte Gargano to intercept some Norman pilgrims. There he petitioned Rainulf Drengot and a band of Norman exiles to aid in his rebellion, assuring them of the ease of victory and the abundance of spoils. By 1017, Norman adventurers were already heading south. They joined with the Lombard forces under Melus at Capua and marched into Apulia immediately, trying to catch the Byzantines off-guard. Successful in an encounter in May on the banks of the Fortore against forces sent by the catapan Kontoleon Tornikios, they had seized all the territory between the Fortore and Trani by September and were ravaging Apulia; in October, however, they experienced a stunning reverse.

The new catapan, Basil Boioannes, had garnered a massive force of reserves and a contingent of the famed Varangian Guard from Emperor Basil II. He met the Norman and Lombard hosts on the Ofanto at the site of the famous defeat dealt the Romans by Hannibal in 216 BC: Battle of Cannae. This second battle of Cannae was a disaster both for the Normans, who lost their leader Gilbert, and for the Lombards, whose leaders fled: Melus to the "Samnite lands" (Amatus) of the Papal States and Dattus to Montecassino and the tower again.

Melus continued wandering through south and central Italy and finally northwards to Germany. He ended up at the imperial court of Henry II in Bamberg. Though greatly honoured (he was given the empty title Duke of Apulia by the emperor), he died a broken man only two years later, just after Pope Benedict arrived in Bamberg at Eastertide to discuss an imperial response to the Byzantine victories. He was given a lavish funeral and an ornate tomb in the new Bamberg Cathedral by his old ally, the emperor. His son Argyrus would carry on the struggle for Lombard independence in Apulia after his return from imprisonment in Constantinople.

== Sources ==
- Norwich, John Julius. The Normans in the South 1016–1130. Longmans: London, 1967.
- Amatus of Montecassino. History of the Normans Book I. Translated by Prescott N. Dunbar. Boydell, 2004. ISBN 1843830787
