= Basil Boioannes =

Byzantine catapan

The Byzantine Empire and its provinces (themes) at the death of Basil II in 1025 AD.

Basil Boioannes (Ancient Greek: Βασίλειος Βοϊωάννης, romanized: Basíleios Boïōánnēs, Byzantine Greek: [vaˈsi.li.os voj.joˈa.nis]; Latin: Basilius Bugianus, Medieval Latin: [baˈsi.li.us bu.d͡ʒiˈa.nus]), in Italian called Bugiano (Italian: [buˈdʒaːno]), was the Byzantine catapan of Italy (1017 – 1027) and one of the greatest Byzantine generals of his time. His accomplishments enabled the Empire to reestablish itself as a major force in southern Italy after centuries of decline. Yet, the Norman adventurers introduced into the power structure of the Mezzogiorno would be the eventual beneficiaries.

== Life ==
Upon his appointment by Emperor Basil II in December 1017, he immediately requested reinforcements from Constantinople to fight the insurgency of the Lombard general Melus of Bari and his Norman soldiery. The request was granted: a detachment of the elite Varangian Guard was sent. The two forces met on the river Ofanto near Cannae, the site of Hannibal's victory over the Romans in 216 BC. In the second Battle of Cannae, Boioannes achieved an equally decisive victory.

Boioannes protected his gains by immediately building a great fortress at the Apennine pass guarding the entrance to the Apulian plain. Troia, named after the ancient city of Asia Minor, was garrisoned by Boioannes' own contingent of Norman troops in 1019. Soon, all the Mezzogiorno had submitted to Byzantine authority, with the exception of the Duchy of Benevento, which remained faithful to the Papacy.

Frightened by the shift in momentum in the south, Pope Benedict VIII went north in 1020 to Bamberg to confer with the Holy Roman Emperor, Henry II. The Emperor took no immediate action, but events of the next year convinced him to intervene. Boioannes and his new ally Prince Pandulf IV of Capua marched on Melus' brother-in-law Dattus and captured his tower on the Garigliano. On 15 June, Dattus was tied up in a sack with a monkey, a rooster, and a snake and thrown into the sea. The next year, in response, a huge imperial army marched south to attack the new fortress of Troia. The garrison held out and never fell. Boioannes granted the town privileges for its loyalty.

In 1025, Boioannes was preparing to lead a Sicilian expedition with Basil II when the great emperor died. Constantine VIII, his co-ruler and successor, cancelled the expedition, and the catapan went north to aid Pandulf in retaking Capua, which Henry II had captured three years earlier. Boioannes offered the new prince of Capua, Pandulf of Teano, safe passage to Naples and accepted his surrender in May 1026. This was to be his last major campaign. In 1027, he was recalled. His replacements hardly lived up to the standard of military effectiveness he set. During the next century, Byzantine influence in Italy steadily declined to nil.

In 1041, Boioannes' son Exaugustus was named catapan, but he did not last a year in that post.

== Sources ==
- Norwich, John Julius. The Normans in the South 1016–1130. Longmans: London, 1967.

Preceded by Leo Tornikios Kontoleon	Catepan of Italy; 1017–1027	Succeeded by Christophoros Burgaris
