= Falco of Benevento =

Falco of Benevento (Italian: Falcone Beneventano; Lombardic: Falco Penevent) was an Italian-Lombard twelfth-century historian, notary and scribe in the papal palace in Benevento, his native city, where he was born to high-standing parents.

He is an important chronicler for the years between 1102 and 1139 in the Mezzogiorno. As an historian, he is not only reliable, as he was often an eyewitness to events he recounts, but also partisan, for he was a Lombard by birth and he fiercely opposed the Normans, whom he saw as barbarians. He was an opponent of King Roger II of Sicily, and a supporter of Innocent II against Roger's friend Anacletus II. He was, above all, a patriotic supporter of Benevento. As a supporter of Innocent II, Falco was exiled from Benevento in 1134. T.S. Brown writes that Falco demonstrated "a blazing pride in his city and a vitriolic hate of the Normans."

Parts of his chronicle are now lost, but were apparently used for the years 1099–1103 and 1140–49 in the Chronica Romanorum pontificum et imperatorum ac de rebus in Apulia gestis.

== Editions ==
- Chronicon Beneventanum at The Latin Library.
- Chronicon Beneventanum at the Centro Europea di Studi Normanni.

== Sources ==
- Curtis, Edmund (1912). Roger of Sicily and the Normans in Lower Italy, 1016-1154. New York-London: G. P. Putnam's Sons. pp. 324–327, 401.
- Dale, Sharon (2007). Chronicling History: Chroniclers and Historians in Medieval and Renaissance Italy. University Park PA USA: Penn State Press. pp. 36–43. ISBN 978-0-271-04558-0.
- D'Angelo, Edoardo (1994). "Giuseppe del Re's 'Critical' Edition of Falco of Benevento's Chronicle," in: Marjorie Chibnall, ed. (1994). Proceedings of the Battle Conference 1993. Anglo-Norman Studies, XVI. Woodbridge, Suffolk UK: Boydell & Brewer Ltd. pp. 75–81. ISBN 978-0-85115-366-7.
- Loud, Graham (2014). The Age of Robert Guiscard: Southern Italy and the Northern Conquest. New York: Routledge. pp. 284–285. ISBN 978-1-317-90023-8.
- Norwich, John Julius. The Kingdom in the Sun 1130-1194. Longman: London, 1970.
