= Battle of Cannae (1018) =

Battle during the Norman conquest of Italy

- Part of the Norman conquest of southern Italy
Date	1018 or 1019
Location	Cannae, Apulia, Byzantine Italy 41°17′47″N 16°9′6″E
Result	Byzantine victory

Belligerents
Byzantine Empire; Varangian Guard	Lombards; Norman mercenaries

Commanders and leaders
Basil Boioannes	Melus of Bari; Gilbert Buatère †

The Battle of Cannae took place in 1018 between the Byzantines under the Catepan of Italy Basil Boioannes and the Lombards under Melus of Bari. The Lombards had also hired some Norman cavalry mercenaries under their leader Gilbert Buatère, while Boioannes had a detachment of elite Varangian Guard sent to him at his request to combat the Normans. The engagement was one of the first clashes between the Byzantines of southern Italy and the Normans.

The battle was disastrous for the Lombards, who were routed. Melus of Bari managed to escape to the Papal States and eventually to the court of Holy Roman Emperor Henry II at Bamberg. The Normans lost their leader, Gilbert Buatère, and most of their group. However, what remained of this group of Normans was the first of many to go to southern Italy.

Within a year, a Norman garrison would be stationed at Troia in the pay of the Byzantine Empire.

== See also ==
- Italy Runestones
