= Treaty of Benevento =

1156 treaty between the Papacy and Normans

The Treaty of Benevento or Concordat of Benevento (18 June 1156) was an important treaty between the papacy of Adrian IV and the Norman Kingdom of Sicily. After years of turbulent relations, the popes finally settled down to a peace with the Hauteville kings.

In 1156, events transpired to leave the pope alone in opposition to the Normans. The army of Michael Palaeologus had been annihilated, the army of Frederick Barbarossa had returned to Germany, and the internal rebels against royal authority in Apulia, men like Robert II of Capua or Richard II of Aquila, had either reconciled or been imprisoned. In short, the pope had no support to continue hostilities. He was also barred from Rome by the populace. He was staying at Benevento, which had been papal territory for over a century. The Sicilian army approached Benevento and the pope was forced to make terms.

The papal chancellor, Roland of Siena, later Pope Alexander III, and the Roman nobleman Oddone Frangipane were sent to negotiate. William of Tyre suggests that the city was besieged, but eyewitnesses contradict him. King William I of Sicily sent his own ammiratus ammiratorum, Maio of Bari, and his two primatial ecclesiastics, Hugh of Palermo and Romuald of Salerno. Starting with the upper hand, the Sicilian envoys finalised a deal on 18 June. This deal was the Treaty of Benevento.

One of the chief authors of the treaty as it stands was a young notary named Matthew of Ajello, later of much fame in Sicily. The kingship of William was recognised over all Sicily, Apulia, Calabria, and Campania, as well as Capua, the coastal cities of Amalfi, Naples, and Gaeta, and even the newly conquered territories in the Marchia (i.e. Marches, or maybe Marsica) and the Abruzzi, which Roger and Alfonso, William's elder brothers, had claimed before. The tribute to the pope of 600 schifati agreed upon by Roger II in 1139 at Mignano was affirmed and another 400 schifati was added for Marsi.

The pope's right to send legates into the peninsular realm was accepted, but the legateship of the king in Sicily was affirmed and the pope had to resign much claimed authority over the island. In the church of S. Marciano, William was invested by the pope with first Sicily, then Apulia, and finally Capua. He received the Kiss of Peace and bestowed on the pope gifts of gold and silver.

The original manuscript of the treaty is in the Vatican Apostolic Archive.

== See also ==
- List of treaties

== Sources ==
- Chalandon, Ferdinand (1968). "The Norman Kingdom of Sicily". In Tanner, J.R.; Previte-Orton, C.W.; Brooke, Z.N. (eds.). The Cambridge Medieval History, Contest of Empire and Papacy. Vol. V.
- Dummett, Jeremy (2015). Palermo, City of Kings: The Heart of Sicily. I.B. Tauris.
- Robinson, I. S. (1990). The Papacy, 1073-1198: Continuity and Innovation. Cambridge University Press.
- Robinson, I.S. (2015). "The Papacy, 1122-1198". In Luscombe, David; Riley-Smith, Jonathan (eds.). The New Cambridge Medieval History: Volume 4, C.1024-c.1198, Part II. Cambridge University Press.
