= Alexander, Count of Conversano =

Italo-Norman nobleman

Alexander (died after 1142) was the second count of Conversano (1085–1132), the son and successor of Geoffrey the Elder.

Alexander, with his brother Tancred, was a constant thorn in the side of Roger II of Sicily. He took part in a civil war that broke out in Bari. Risone, the archbishop of the city, was murdered (1117) and the princess of Taranto, Constance of France, was imprisoned at Giovinazzo (1119) by Grimoald Alferanites, the prince of Bari, and Alexander.

After Roger was defeated at the Battle of Nocera in 1132, Tancred returned to the Mezzogiorno and entered into open rebellion again, taking the cities of Montepeloso and Acerenza, with the support of their populations. He raised a force with his brother Tancred, Count Godfrey of Andria, Count Ranulf of Alife, and Prince Robert II of Capua. Roger crossed the Straits of Messina with a large force and Alexander was so afraid that he abandoned his city of Matera to his son, Geoffrey the Younger, and fled to the court of Ranulf. After Roger successfully besieged Matera, Alexander, deeply grieved, fled to Dalmatia. He was deprived of his fief and unable to return home. He tried to meet up with the Emperor Lothair II, but was set upon by thieves in a forest. According to Alexander of Telese, he was left in the town of Valona very poor.

In 1142, near the end of his life, he appears as an envoy along with Robert of Capua of Conrad III of Germany to the Byzantine Emperor John II Comnenus. Their mission was the arrangement of a marriage between Conrad's sister-in-law Bertha of Sulzbach and John's son Manuel. This marriage sealed an alliance between the two empires, Holy Roman and Byzantine, against Roger of Sicily.

On the same day in 1135 that he made his son Alfonso prince of Capua, Roger made his brother-in-law Robert I of Basunvilla, "a man in the flower of his youth", as Alexander of Telese says, "both affable and most active in knightly deeds", count of Conversano.

== Sources ==
- Lexikon de Mittelalters.
- Norwich, John Julius. The Normans in the South 1016-1130. Longmans: London, 1967.
- Alexander of Telese, translated by G. A. Loud. The Deeds Done by Roger of Sicily. Introduction and Books One, Two, Three, and Four

| Preceded by Geoffrey the Elder | Count of Conversano; 1100-1132 | Succeeded by Robert I of Bassunvilla |
