= 1139 =

1139 in various calendars
- Gregorian calendar: 1139; MCXXXIX
- Ab urbe condita: 1892
- Armenian calendar: 588; ԹՎ ՇՁԸ
- Assyrian calendar: 5889
- Balinese saka calendar: 1060–1061
- Bengali calendar: 545–546
- Berber calendar: 2089
- English Regnal year: 4 Ste. 1 – 5 Ste. 1
- Buddhist calendar: 1683
- Burmese calendar: 501
- Byzantine calendar: 6647–6648
- Chinese calendar: 戊午年 (Earth Horse); 3836 or 3629 — to — 己未年 (Earth Goat); 3837 or 3630
- Coptic calendar: 855–856
- Discordian calendar: 2305
- Ethiopian calendar: 1131–1132
- Hebrew calendar: 4899–4900
- Hindu calendars
- Vikram Samvat: 1195–1196
- Shaka Samvat: 1060–1061
- Kali Yuga: 4239–4240
- Holocene calendar: 11139
- Igbo calendar: 139–140
- Iranian calendar: 517–518
- Islamic calendar: 533–534
- Japanese calendar: Hōen 5 (保延５年)
- Javanese calendar: 1045–1046
- Julian calendar: 1139; MCXXXIX
- Korean calendar: 3472
- Minguo calendar: 773 before ROC 民前773年
- Nanakshahi calendar: −329
- Seleucid era: 1450/1451 AG
- Thai solar calendar: 1681–1682
- Tibetan calendar: ས་ཕོ་རྟ་ལོ་ (male Earth-Horse); 1265 or 884 or 112 — to — ས་མོ་ལུག་ལོ་ (female Earth-Sheep); 1266 or 885 or 113

Year 1139 (MCXXXIX) was a common year starting on Sunday of the Julian calendar.

== Events ==
=== By region ===
==== Asia ====
- July 8 or August 21 – Jin–Song Wars: Battle of Yancheng – Song dynasty general Yue Fei defeats an army led by Jin dynasty general Wuzhu.
- September 30 – A magnitude 7.7 earthquake strikes the Caucasus mountains in the Seljuk Empire, causing great devastation and killing 300,000 people.

==== Europe ====
- January 25 – Godfrey II, Count of Louvain becomes Duke of Lower Lorraine.
- April 8 – Second Council of the Lateran: Roger II of Sicily is excommunicated by Pope Innocent II.
- April 9 – The Treaty of Durham is signed, between Stephen, King of England and David I of Scotland.
- May – Representatives of Polvese Island formally submit the island to the city of Perugia, pledging military support, fiscal obligations, and an annual tribute of tench.
- July 22 – Pope Innocent II, invading the Kingdom of Sicily, is ambushed at Galluccio and taken prisoner.
- July 25
  - Treaty of Mignano: Pope Innocent II proclaims Roger II of Sicily as King of Sicily, Duke of Apulia and Prince of Capua.
  - Battle of Ourique: The independence of Portugal from the Kingdom of León is declared after the Almoravids, led by Ali ibn Yusuf, are defeated by Prince Afonso Henriques. He then becomes Afonso I, King of Portugal, after calling the first assembly of the Estates-General of Portugal at Lamego, where he is given the Crown from the Bishop of Bragança, to confirm the independence.

=== By topic ===
==== Education ====
- King's School, Pontefract, in England is founded.

==== Religion ====
- April – Second Council of the Lateran: The Anacletus schism is settled, and priestly celibacy is made mandatory within the Catholic Church.
- November – Alberic of Ostia, papal legate to Outremer, convenes a legatine council in the cathedral of Antioch to examine the conduct of the Latin patriarch. The council is also attended by the Armenian Catholicos Gregory III and marks a symbolic beginning for Armenian-Latin ecclesiastic high-level contacts.

== Births ==
- June 3 – Conon of Naso, Basilian abbot (d. 1236)
- June 16 – Emperor Konoe of Japan (d. 1155)
- Agnes II – abbess and artist (d. 1203)

== Deaths ==
- January 25 – Count Godfrey I of Louvain and Duke of Lower Lorraine (as Godfrey VI)
- February 18 – Prince Yaropolk II of Kiev (b. 1082)
- June 29 – Empress Xing of China (b. 1106)
- October 20 – Henry the Proud (Henry X), Duke of Bavaria
- December – Roger of Salisbury, English bishop
