= Guarin =

Guarin (French: Guérin, Italian: Guarino, Norman: Warin) (died 21 January 1137) was the chaplain (magister capellanus) and chancellor of Roger II of Sicily from about 1130 to his death, during the first decade of the Norman kingdom of Sicily. According to Alexander of Telese, the contemporary chronicler, he was "erudite ... and most prudent in negotiations ... a cleric well-versed in letters, skillful in matters of the world, and possessed of a tenacious and cautious mind."

== Biography ==
Guarin was a Norman from France who arrived in Italy not long before Roger was crowned king in 1130. He first appears as cancellarius (chancellor) in a diploma of 1130 and then appears in an August 1132 diploma as magister cancellarius (master chancellor). When his chancellorship proper began has been disputed, the Dizionario giving a date of 1131 and Houben of 1133.

In the winter of 1134–1135, Guarin and the Emir John were sent at the head of an army into the Terra di Lavoro against the rebel trio of Robert II of Capua, Sergius VII of Naples, and Ranulf II of Alife. The rebels had taken Aversa, which the two generals set about trying to retake. Guarin also defended and fortified Capua against any possible assault. After the arrival of Roger II on the scene, the insurrection soon collapsed and Guarin took Alife and Raviscanina without opposition. Guarin joined the siege of Naples then in progress.

Having taken control of Capua for the king, he was appointed the administrator of the eponymous Principality of Capua when the king made his son Alfonso prince that year (1135). For the next two years, Guarin governed Capua with the young prince.

When, in late Summer 1136, the Emperor Lothair II led a large army down the peninsula, Guarin was sent again to prepare a defence and to force cooperation out of the abbot Seniorectus and the monks of Montecassino. On 5 January 1137, Guarin demanded their assistance and when refused besieged the monastery in an attempt to seize its treasure and its walls (to use as a fortress against the army of Henry X of Bavaria). He contracted illness during the siege and died at Salerno on 21 January. The Chronica monasterii Casinensis cites his death as evidence of divine justice.

Guarin was succeeded in his office briefly by his lieutenant on the scene, Jocelyn. As master chaplain he was succeeded by Thomas Brun and as chancellor by Robert of Selby, both Englishmen.

== Sources ==
- Caravale, Mario (ed). Dizionario Biografico degli Italiani: LX Grosso – Guglielmo da Forlì. Rome, 2003.
- Matthew, Donald. The Norman Kingdom of Sicily. Cambridge University Press: 1992.
- Houben, Hubert. Roger II of Sicily: A Ruler between East and West. Trans. G. A. Loud and Diane Milbourne. Cambridge University Press: 2002.
- Curtis, Edmund. Roger of Sicily and the Normans in Lower Italy 1016–1154. G. P. Putnam's Sons: New York, 1912.
- Alexander of Telese, translated by G. A. Loud. The Deeds Done by Roger of Sicily. Introduction and Books One, Two, Three, and Four
