= Jocelyn (Sicilian chancellor) =

Jocelyn (original Latin: Canzolinus, Italianised as Gozzelino) was an Italo-Norman officer serving Roger II of Sicily.

In 1134, he was appointed lieutenant to Guarin in the Terra di Lavoro with the title of Chamberlain (camerarius). In 1135 he was made the procurator of the Principality of Capua for the young Prince Alfonso while Guarin was made Alfonso's regent. He took part in the sieges of Montecassino and Salerno in January 1137. After Guarin's death on 21 January, Jocelyn succeeded him as interim chancellor (magister cancellarius) and took over the Italo-Norman forces trying to occupy Montecassino and defend Salerno from the army of the Emperor Lothair II. After securing the election of an Anacletan abbot at Montecassino, Jocelyn was replaced by Robert of Selby as chancellor.

== Sources ==
- Curtis, Edmund. Roger of Sicily and the Normans in Lower Italy 1016–1154. New York: G. P. Putnam's Sons, 1912.
- Matthew, Donald. The Norman Kingdom of Sicily. Cambridge: Cambridge University Press, 1992.
- Houben, Hubert. Roger II of Sicily: A Ruler between East and West. Trans. G. A. Loud and Diane Milbourne. Cambridge: Cambridge University Press, 2002.
