= Tancred of Conversano =

Tancred of Conversano, the youngest son of Geoffrey, Count of Conversano, became the count of Brindisi on his father's death in 1100.

Tancred's elder brother Alexander succeeded their father as count of Conversano. In 1121, Count Roger II of Sicily invaded the Basilicata to annex the county of Montescaglioso which had formerly been held by his sister Emma in right of her deceased husband Rudolf Maccabeus. In April, Tancred assisted Duke William II of Apulia and Prince Bohemond II of Taranto and Antioch in conquering the castle of Basento, within the county of Montescaglioso claimed of Roger. With the help of Pope Callistus II, a treaty, however, ended hostilities between the descendants of Tancred of Hauteville. Tancred was recognised as count of Brindisi.

Tancred became part of a grand alliance of rebels, including Robert II of Capua, Ranulf II of Alife, Grimoald of Bari, Geoffrey of Andria, and Roger of Ariano. In the spring of 1129, Roger entered the peninsula with a great army to claim Apulia after William's death (1127). Many of the princes came to heel, but in the summer of 1131, when Roger left, Grimoald and Tancred revolted immediately and took the port of Brindisi and held it against Roger. In May 1132, Grimoald was taken captive and Tancred was only spared by a promise to leave on crusade. He gave up Brindisi for twenty gold coins.

In 1133, Tancred was preparing for a crusade when an insurrection broke out around him. He joined the revolt at Montepeloso. There he "dug in," as Lord Norwich informs, and took command of the Apulian rebels, who held Melfi, Venosa, Barletta, and many other cities. Roger fell on them and took the central cities, cutting Tancred off from his Capuan allies and then isolated Montepeloso itself. Ranulf of Alife sent forty knights under Roger of Plenco to assist him, but other than that he was helpless. After two weeks of siege, with engines, the city capitulated and, as the rebel sympathiser Falco of Benevento, relates:

Tancred and the unfortunate Roger flung down their arms and sought refuge among the darkest and most obscure alleys of the town; but they were sought out, and discovered . . . [T]he King decreed that Roger should forthwith be hanged by the neck, and that Tancred himself, with his own hand, should pull on the rope.

Tancred was imprisoned in Sicily, where he disappears from history.

== Sources ==
- Lexikon de Mittelalters.
- Falco of Benevento. Chronicon Beneventanum.
- Norwich, John Julius. The Normans in the South 1016-1130. Longmans: London, 1967.
- Norwich, John Julius. The Kingdom in the Sun 1130-1194. Longman: London, 1970.
- Alexander of Telese, translated by G. A. Loud. The Deeds Done by Roger of Sicily. Introduction and Books One, Two, Three, and Four

== See also ==
- Curtis, Edmund (1912). Roger of Sicily and the Normans in Lower Italy 1016-1154. Heroes of the Nations series. G. P. Putnam's Sons, NY & London. See pp. 165-166 for the 1133 siege of Montepeloso; 358 for the 1132 surrender of Bari.
