= Robert I, Count of Conversano =

Italo-Norman noble

Robert I of Bassunvilla (also Basunvilla and Bassonville) (born c.1080 - died 1138 or 1140) was a Norman baron from Molise. His family originated in Vassonville, near Dieppe.

In 1110, Robert married Judith, the youngest daughter of Roger I of Sicily and his second wife Eremburga of Mortain.

In 1132, Alexander, Count of Conversano, fled to Dalmatia and was dispossessed of his territories by King Roger II. In 1135, Roger gave the principality of Capua to his son Alfonso and the county of Conversano to his brother-in-law Robert, "a man in the flower of his youth, both affable and most active in knightly deeds", according to Alexander of Telese.

Robert died not long after and was succeeded by his son, Robert II of Bassunvilla.

Preceded by Alexander	Count of Conversano; 1132–1138	Succeeded by Robert II of Bassunvilla
