= Abu l-Daw' =

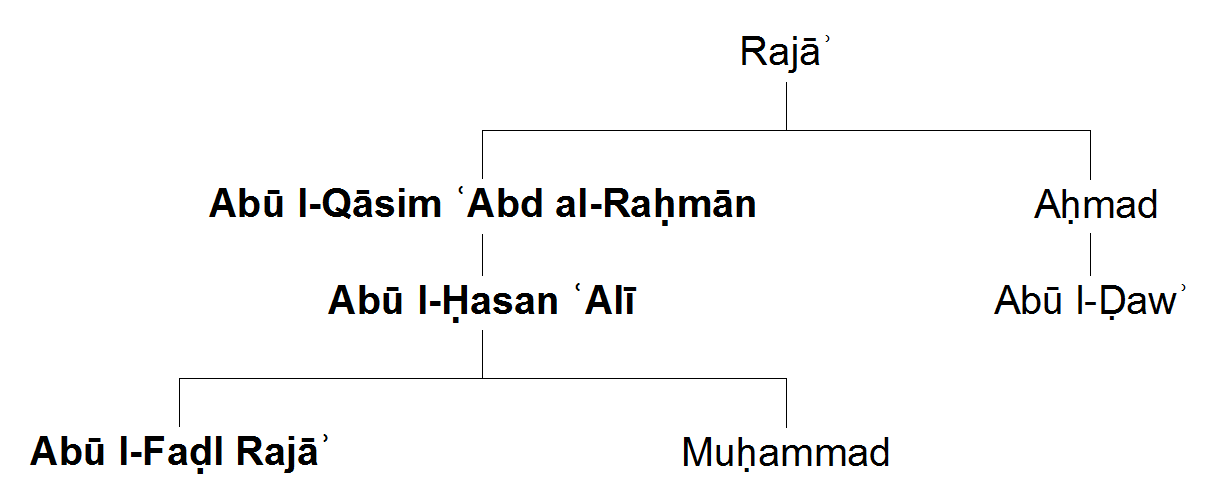
Family of Abū l-Ḍawʾ. Bold names indicate those who held the office of al-shaykh al-faqīh al-qāḍī of Palermo.

Abū l-Ḍawʾ Sirāj ibn Aḥmad ibn Rajāʾ (Arabic: أبو الضوء) (fl. 1123–c.1145) was a Sicilian Muslim administrator and Arabic poet in the Norman county of Sicily. He worked closely with Count (later King) Roger II as a secretary and later wrote a poem on the death of one of Roger's sons.

Abū l-Ḍawʾ is a nickname meaning "father of light", his birth name being Sirāj. His father was Aḥmad and his grandfather Rajāʾ. He was born into a prominent Muslim family from Palermo, the Banū Rajā. Four members of three generations of the Banū Rajā held the office of al-shaykh al-faqīh al-qāḍī of Palermo with jurisdiction over the local Muslim community between 1123 and 1161.

== Official ==
The earliest document to mention Abū l-Ḍawʾ dates from January 1123 and is written in Greek. It is a record of court case between Count Roger's cousin, Muriella of Petterrana, and an Arab landowner, Abū Maḍar ibn al-Biththirrānī, over the possession of a mill. Abū l-Ḍawʾ was a member of the panel of judges that found in favour of Muriella. He may have been included because the case involved some Arab witnesses and Arabic documents. The vizier Christodulus and Abū l-Ḍawʾ's uncle, the qāḍī of Palermo, also sat on the panel. The title he is given in the document is ὁ καΐτος (ho kaïtos, a hellenized form of the Arabic al-qāʾid). In Greek, his name was rendered Βοδδάος (Boddaos). At a later date at least, the title of al-qāʾid was standard for all Muslim officials at court.

According to a later source, al-Maqrīzī's biography of George of Antioch, Abū l-Ḍawʾ was offered the Sicilian vizierate after the removal of Christodulus around 1126. According to al-Maqrīzī, George denounced the vizier to Roger, who had him arrested and executed, but when Roger offered the position to Abū l-Ḍawʾ, the latter declined on the grounds that he was merely a man of letters. George was then appointed vizier. Al-Maqrīzī gives Abū l-Ḍawʾ the title of al-kātib al-inshāʾ, secretary of correspondence, which was one of the highest offices in contemporary Fatimid Egypt. There is no evidence, however, that the Normans organized their government along Fatimid lines and little can be said about what the office of kātib al-inshāʾ would have entailed in the 1120s, if it is not merely an anachronism on the part of al-Maqrīzī.

According to Ibn al-Athīr, Roger established a dīwān al-maẓālim (board of grievances) to hear complaints from the people. It is possible that this dīwān was overseen by Abū l-Ḍawʾ, since the 1123 court has some characteristics of a maẓālim tribunal and this would be consistent with the office of al-kātib al-inshāʾ as it was in Fatimid Egypt.

The Persian historian ʿImād ad-Dīn al-Iṣfahānī (died 1201) also calls Abū l-Ḍawʾ a kātib (secretary). It may have been that he was responsible for Roger's correspondence with the Fatimids and Zirids, which was constant, and with the independent local ruler Yusuf of Gabès. Al-Maqrīzī's account suggests that he was literate not only in Arabic but in Greek also, in order to have been offered Christodulus' position. Although his public activity is only evidenced for the brief period 1123–26, the poem he wrote on the death of Roger's son proved he had some proximity to the royal court as late as the mid-1140s. His importance to the development in Norman administration relates to his appearance as a high-ranking Arab secretary in the formative and experimental period between the death of Roger's mother, the Countess Adelaide del Vasto (1118), and Roger's own royal coronation (1130).

== Poet ==
Only three extracts of Abū l-Ḍawʾ's poetry survive. More of his work was contained in the now lost Anthology of Poetry and Prose of the Best Men of the Age (Note: al-Mukhtār fi l-naẓm wa-l-nathr li-afāḍil ahl al-ʿaṣr) compiled in Sicily by Ibn Bashrūn al-Ṣiqillī and published in 561 AH, (Note: AD 1165–66.) but only three extracts from this work quoted by ʿImād ad-Dīn al-Iṣfahānī in his anthology, Kharīdat al-qaṣr, are known today. The first extract is from an exchange of verses with the faqīh (jurist) ʿĪsā ibn ʿAbd al-Munʿim al-Ṣiqillī, who had asked to borrow a book. The second extract is five verses from an elegy written on the death of a friend. The third and longest extract, which is also the most historically interesting and the most beautiful, (Note: Johns 2002, p. 88, calls it "a more than competent elegy"; Mallette 2005, p. 100, "one of the most pathetic and affecting poems written for the Norman monarchs".) is seventeen verses from a lament on the death of "the son of Roger the Frank, lord of Sicily". Below are four verses:

The radiant moon has been extinguished and the world grown dark
and our support has tumbled from its grandeur and its nobility

Ah, just when he stood tall in his beauty and his majesty,
and when glories and nations felt proud of him

...

His war-tents and his palaces weep for him
and his sword and his lances lament him

And the whinnies of his horses turn, in their throats,
to nostalgia, though reins and halters restrain them. . .

The son is not named, but the poem suggests that he had recently come of age at the time of his death, making Tancred (died 1138/40) or Alfonso (died 1144), who both died in their teens or early twenties, the most likely subjects. (Note: The eldest son, Roger, died in 1149 at 31 years old.) Beside these three extracts, ʿImād ad-Dīn also quotes some verses of Abū l-Ṣalt Umayya that were sent to Abū l-Ḍawʾ.

== Bibliography ==
Books

- ʿAbbas, Ihsan (1994). A Biographical Dictionary of Sicilian Learned Men and Poets. Beirut: Dar al-Gharb al-Islami.
- Johns, Jeremy (2002). Arabic Administration in Norman Sicily: The Royal Dīwān. Cambridge University Press.
- Mallette, Karla (2005). The Kingdom of Sicily, 1100–1250: A Literary History. Philadelphia: University of Pennsylvania Press.
- Metcalfe, Alex (2009). The Muslims of Medieval Italy. Edinburgh University Press.

Articles

- De Simone, Adalgisa (1999). "Il Mezzogiorno normanno-svevo visto dall'Islam africano". In Giosuè Musca (ed.). Il mezzogiorno normanno-svevo visto dall'Europa e dal mondo mediterraneo. Edizioni Dedalo. pp. 261–94.
- Jamil, Nadia; Johns, Jeremy (2016). "A New Latin–Arabic Document from Norman Sicily (November 595 H / 1198 CE)". In Maurice A. Pomerantz; Aram A. Shahin (eds.). The Heritage of Arabo-Islamic Learning: Studies Presented to Wadad Kadi. Leiden: Brill. pp. 111–68.
