= Elizabeth of Blois, Duchess of Apulia =

French noblewoman

Elizabeth of Blois, sometimes Isabelle (c. 1130 – after 1175), was a French noblewoman, the duchess of Apulia by marriage (1143–1149) and a nun at Fontevraud.

== Lineage and marriage negotiations ==
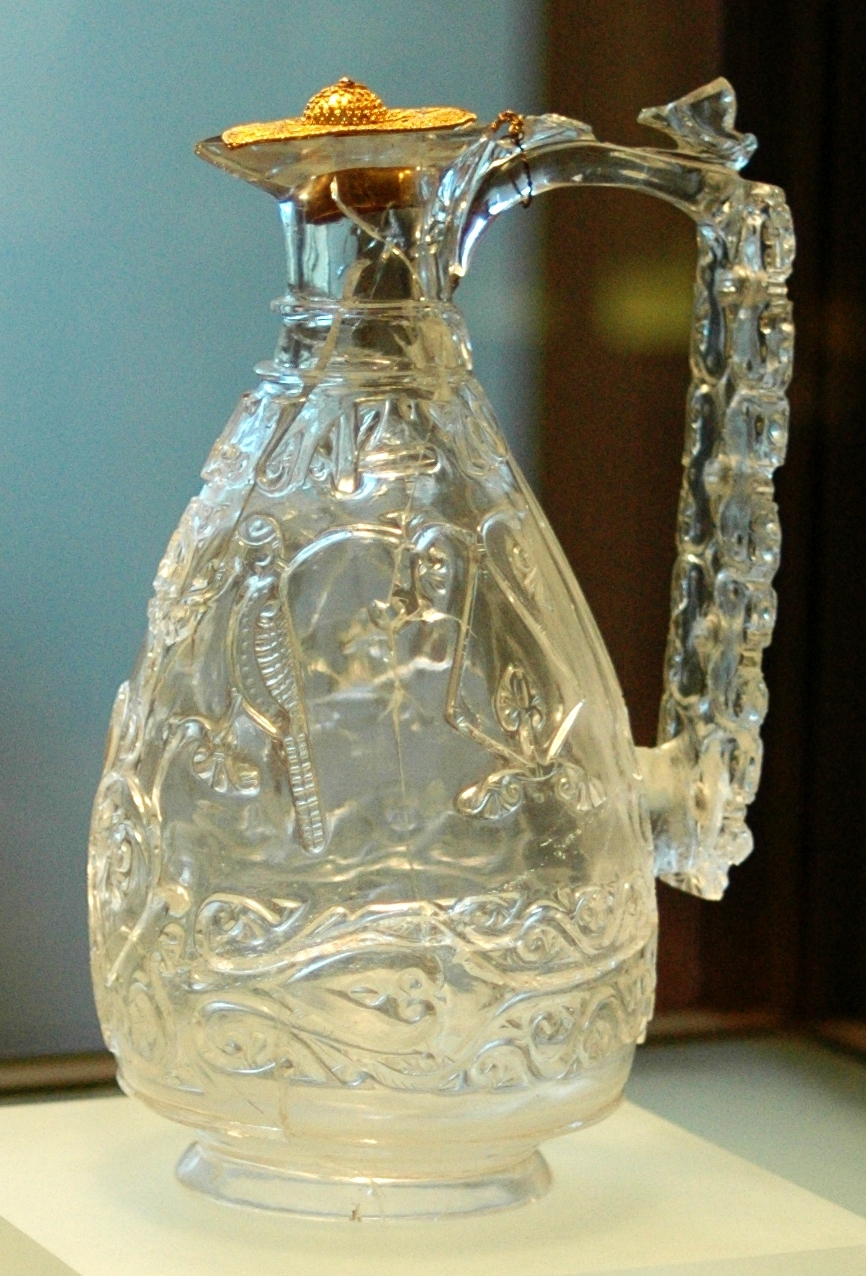
The rock crystal ewer given by Elizabeth's future father-in-law to her father on the occasion of her betrothal

Elizabeth was born around 1130. She was a daughter of Count Theobald IV of Blois, a niece of King Stephen of England and a great-granddaughter of William the Conqueror. According to Alberic of Trois-Fontaines, she was Theobald's third daughter. Her illustrious lineage made her a suitable match for a king's son. By 1140, she was betrothed to Duke Roger III of Apulia, eldest son and heir apparent of King Roger II of Sicily. During the negotiations for the marriage, Theobald received an "exquisite" Fatimid rock crystal ewer, which he later gave to Abbot Suger and is now the Ewer of Saint-Denis in the Louvre.

It is very likely that Bernard of Clairvaux acted as mediator in the marriage negotiations. He had previously mediated between Roger II and Pope Innocent II, which bore fruit in the treaty of Mignano of 1139. According to a surviving letter of Bernard to Roger II, dated to August 1140, the Sicilian envoys were expected soon to arrive in Montpellier. From there, they would escort the bride and some Cistercian monks back to Sicily. Three further letters from Bernard to Roger deal with the foundation of the first Cistercian monastery in southern Italy, which seems to have been a kind of payment for Bernard's mediation. The monastery of Santa Maria della Sambucina may be the foundation in question, although this is not certain.

== First marriage ==
Elizabeth probably arrived in Sicily in 1141. Her marriage, however, seems to have been delayed. In early 1143, Roger II was negotiating with the Byzantine Empire for a better marriage alliance. By late 1143, however, Roger III and Elizabeth had been married. She took the title "duchess" after her marriage. Although Roger had already fathered two children out of wedlock, there is no record he had any with Elizabeth.

Elizabeth may have had a brief reunion with some of her family when her brother, Henry the Liberal, stopped in Palermo on his return voyage from the Second Crusade in late 1148. She may also have played a role in acquiring the porphyry for her father's tomb, since Roger II had a similar tomb of porphyry. Her husband died unexpectedly on 2 May 1149, and Elizabeth returned to France. She continued to use the title of duchess until her death.

== Second marriage and retirement ==
Between about 1150 and 1155, Elizabeth married William IV, lord of Perche-Gouët. According to Alberic, they had two daughters: Matilda, who married Hervé III of Donzy, and Agnes, who married Rotrou of Montfort. Matilda was the mother of Count Hervé of Nevers.

William died in the Holy Land while on a pilgrimage in 1168. He was buried in the cathedral in Sebastia, the purported site of the tomb of John the Baptist. That year, Elizabeth made a donation to the cathedral for the sake of his soul. Their eldest daughter and her husband, Matilda and Hervé, succeeded to the lordship, but Elizabeth remained influential in the Perche-Gouët.

Sometime after William's death, Elizabeth entered Fontevraud Abbey, where her sisters Margaret and Mary, widow of Duke Odo II of Burgundy, were already nuns. This probably took place between 1173, when she met her sister Matilda, wife of Count Rotrou IV of Perche, at Bonneval Abbey, and 1175, when Henry the Liberal made a grant to Fontevraud. Henry was persuaded by his brother, Archbishop William of Reims, to increase his original grant by 10 livres "because our sisters are nuns there".

The necrology of the priory of Fontaines-les-Nonnes lists the death under 13 August of "Lady Elizabeth, venerable nun, duchess, sister of the duchess Lady Mary" (Domina Elisabeth, venerabilis monacha, ducissa, soror domine Marie ducissa).

== Bibliography ==
- Evergates, Theodore (2016). Henry the Liberal: Count of Champagne, 1127–1181. University of Pennsylvania Press.
- Evergates, Theodore (2018). Marie of France: Countess of Champagne, 1145–1198. University of Pennsylvania Press.
- Houben, Hubert (2002) [1997]. Roger II of Sicily: A Ruler Between East and West. Translated by Graham A. Loud; Diane Milburn. Cambridge University Press.
- Kenaan-Kedar, Nurith (1992). "The Cathedral of Sebaste: Its Western Donors and Models". In Benjamin Kedar (ed.). The Horns of Hattin: Proceedings of the 2nd Conference of the Society for the Study of the Crusades and the Latin East. Yad Izhak Ben-Zvi. pp. 99–120.
- Thompson, Kathleen Hapgood (1995). The Counts of the Perche, c. 1066–1217 (PDF) (PhD diss.). University of Sheffield.
- Thompson, Kathleen Hapgood (1997). "The Formation of the County of Perche: the Rise and Fall of the House of Gouet". In K. S. B. Keats-Rohan (ed.). Family Trees and the Roots of Politics: The Prosopography of Britain and France from the Tenth to the Twelfth Century. Woodbridge: Boydell & Brewer. pp. 299–314.
