= John (Sicilian admiral) =

John was the amiratus or emir of Roger II of Sicily. John was born to the Admiral Eugenius in Palermo, where his family had moved from Troina. His brothers were the logothete Philip and the amiratus Nicholas. His uncle was the notary Basil. All his family members were closely connected to the royal family and in its service. John's son was the equally famous Eugenius II.

In 1131, John was sent across the Strait of Messina to join up with a royal troop from Apulia and Calabria and march on Amalfi by land while George of Antioch blockaded the town by sea and set up a base on Capri. Amalfi soon capitulated.

In 1135, John and the chancellor Guarin were sent to Campania and the Principality of Salerno to defend the royal castles against the general rebellion of Robert II of Capua, Ranulf II of Alife, and Sergius VII of Naples. They successfully defended Capua with 2,000 knights and a similar-sized complement of infantry, but Aversa fell to Robert.

== Sources ==
- Norwich, John Julius. The Kingdom in the Sun 1130-1194. London: Longmans, 1970.
- Curtis, Edmund. Roger of Sicily and the Normans in Lower Italy 1016–1154. New York: G. P. Putnam's Sons, 1912.
- Matthew, Donald. The Norman Kingdom of Sicily (Cambridge Medieval Textbooks). Cambridge University Press, 1992.
- Houben, Hubert (translated by Graham A. Loud and Diane Milburn). Roger II of Sicily: Ruler between East and West. Cambridge University Press, 2002.
