= Seniorectus =

Seniorectus (died February 1137) was the abbot of Montecassino in the early twelfth century.

Seniorectus was opposed to the policy of Roger II of Sicily, who intended in the late summer of 1136 to establish a garrison in Montecassino under the chamberlain Joscelin and chancellor Guarin, as defense against the invading armies of Emperor Lothair II and Henry X of Bavaria. On 5 January 1137, Guarin demanded their assistance and when refused besieged the monastery in an attempt to seize its treasure and its walls. The abbot contracted an illness during the siege and died a few months later. While Parlamocchi placed the rebellion of Seniorectus and the attempted garrisoning of Montecassino in 1134, this hypothesis is refuted by the presence of Joscelin in the chronicle of Peter the Deacon: Joscelin being appointed chamberlain only in October 1135.

== Sources ==
- Howe, John. Church Reform and Social Change in Eleventh-Century Italy: Dominic of Sora and his Patrons. Philadelphia: University of Pennsylvania, 1997. Review
- Parlamocchi, Roberto. L'Abbazia di Montecassino e Conquista Normanna. Rome: Loescher, 1913. Review
