= Tancred, Prince of Bari =

Prince of Bari (c. 1119-?)

Tancred of Hauteville (born c. 1119, died 16 March between 1138 and 1140), the second son of King Roger II of Sicily and his first wife, Elvira of Castile, was the Prince of Bari and Taranto from 1132 to 1138.

He was named by his father to replace the rebellious Grimoald, Prince of Bari, in 1132. He was only about thirteen or fourteen years old at the time. When he grew to adulthood, he became, along with his brothers Roger, duke of Apulia, and Alfonso, prince of Capua, one of his father's chief men on the peninsula, while the king himself remained mostly in Sicily.

Tancred died young between 1138 and 1140. William, his other brother, inherited his estates and titles. An elegy for an unnamed "son of Roger the Frank, lord of Sicily" by the Sicilian poet Abū l-Ḍawʾ was likely about Tancred, since the son in question was a young man who had only just begun his martial career. It was possibly about his brother Alfonso.

== Sources ==
- Grierson, Philip; Blackburn, Mark A. S.; Travaini, Lucia (1998). Medieval European Coinage. Vol. 14: Italy (III) (South Italy, Sicily, Sardinia). Cambridge: Cambridge University Press.
- Houben, Hubert (2002). Roger II of Sicily: A Ruler Between East and West. Cambridge: Cambridge University Press.
- Jamison, Evelyn (1913). "The Norman Administration of Apulia and Capua, more especially under Roger II and William I, 1127–66". Papers of the British School at Rome. 6: 211–481. doi:10.1017/s006824620000132x. S2CID 161057290.
- Johns, Jeremy (2002). Arabic Administration in Norman Sicily: The Royal Dīwān. Cambridge University Press.
- Matthew, Donald (1992). The Norman Kingdom of Sicily. Cambridge: Cambridge University Press.
- Takayama, Hiroshi (1993). The Administration of the Norman Kingdom of Sicily. Leiden: E. J. Brill.

Preceded by Grimoald	Prince of Bari; 1132–1138	Succeeded by Jaquintus
Preceded by Roger	Prince of Taranto; 1132–1138	Succeeded by William I
