= Roger III of Apulia =

Eldest son of Roger II of Sicily (1118–1148)

Roger III
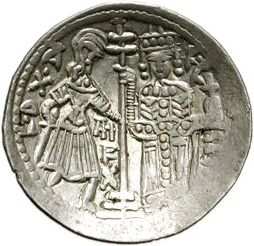
- Roger (left), in battle dress and bearing a sword, and his father (right), dressed as a Byzantine emperor. From the first issue of the ducat (1140).

Duke of Apulia and Calabria
- Reign: 1135 - 1148
- Predecessor: Roger II
- Successor: William I
- Born: 1118
- Died: 2 or 12 May 1148
- Spouse: Elizabeth of Blois
- Issue: Tancred, King of Sicily (illegitimate); William (illegitimate)
- House: Hauteville
- Father: Roger II of Sicily
- Mother: Elvira of Castile

Roger III (1118 – 2 or 12 May 1148) was the eldest son of King Roger II of Sicily and Elvira of Castile. He was the Duke of Apulia from 1134 until his death.

Roger's first public act took place at Melfi in 1129, where, though still a child, he accepted the fealty of some rebellious barons along with his father and his younger brother Tancred. His father was crowned king of Sicily the next year on 25 December. It is possible that Roger received the Duchy of Apulia at this time. He had certainly received it from his father by 1134. He was perhaps put under the tutelage or guardianship of Robert of Selby. He took part in his father's campaigns beginning in 1137, when he distinguished himself in the campaign against Ranulf of Alife, whom Pope Innocent II and the Emperor Lothair II had invested as rival duke of Apulia. His first major engagement was the Battle of Rignano on 30 October; a battle in which more experienced warriors, like his father, fled and some, like Duke Sergius VII of Naples, died. Roger's bravery, and success in the first charge, at Rignano solidified his martial reputation early.

After Ranulf's death (1139), Apulia was secured, but Innocent and his ally, Prince Robert II of Capua, marched on Melfi. At Galluccio, Roger ambushed the papal troops with only a thousand knights and captured the pope and his entourage. Three days later, on July 25 at Mignano, Innocent confirmed the elder Roger as king, the younger as duke, and the third son, Alfonso, as prince of Capua—officially severing Robert from his support. Next, Duke Roger took the city of Naples into his possession and made it an integral part of the kingdom, ending the republican government which had continued after Sergius' death.

In 1140, after the promulgation of the king's Assizes of Ariano, the first ducats were minted bearing an effigy of the young duke in battledress beside his father, with their hands on the Cross. The ducat was named after the duchy of Apulia. Roger and Alfonso, the second son Tancred being dead, then moved into the Abruzzi to harass papal lands. At that time, late in 1140, Roger's bride to be, Elizabeth, arrived from the court of her father, Theobald II of Champagne. Roger's most famous consort, however, was his mistress, Emma, the daughter of Achard II, Count of Lecce, with whom he had two illegitimate children,

- Tancred, later king, and
- William (after 1137 – 1167/68).

In 1149, barely thirty, Duke Roger died an unknown death in an unknown location. He was mourned by the Arab poet Abu ed-Daw, who said, "the arms of the brave have fallen . . . and the eloquent seek for words in vain." Roger was buried in the chapel of Saint Mary Magdalene next to the old Cathedral of Palermo. He was later transferred to an eponymous chapel now in the barracks of San Giacomo. His successor was his only surviving brother, William, later King of Sicily.

== Sources ==
- Chalandon, Ferdinand (1907). Histoire de la domination normande en Italie et en Sicile. Vol. 2. Paris: Alphonse Picard.
- Evergates, Theodore (2016). Henry the Liberal: Count of Champagne, 1127-1181. University of Pennsylvania Press.
- Grierson, Philip; Blackburn, Mark A. S.; Travaini, Lucia (1998). Medieval European Coinage. Vol. 14: Italy (III) (South Italy, Sicily, Sardinia). Cambridge: Cambridge University Press.
- Houben, Hubert (2002). Roger II of Sicily: A Ruler Between East and West. Cambridge: Cambridge University Press.
- Jamison, Evelyn (1913). "The Norman Administration of Apulia and Capua, more especially under Roger II and William I, 1127–66". Papers of the British School at Rome. 6: 211–481. doi:10.1017/s006824620000132x. S2CID 161057290.
- Matthew, Donald (1992). The Norman Kingdom of Sicily. Cambridge: Cambridge University Press.
- Takayama, Hiroshi (1993). The Administration of the Norman Kingdom of Sicily. Leiden: E. J. Brill.
