= Hugh (archbishop of Palermo) =

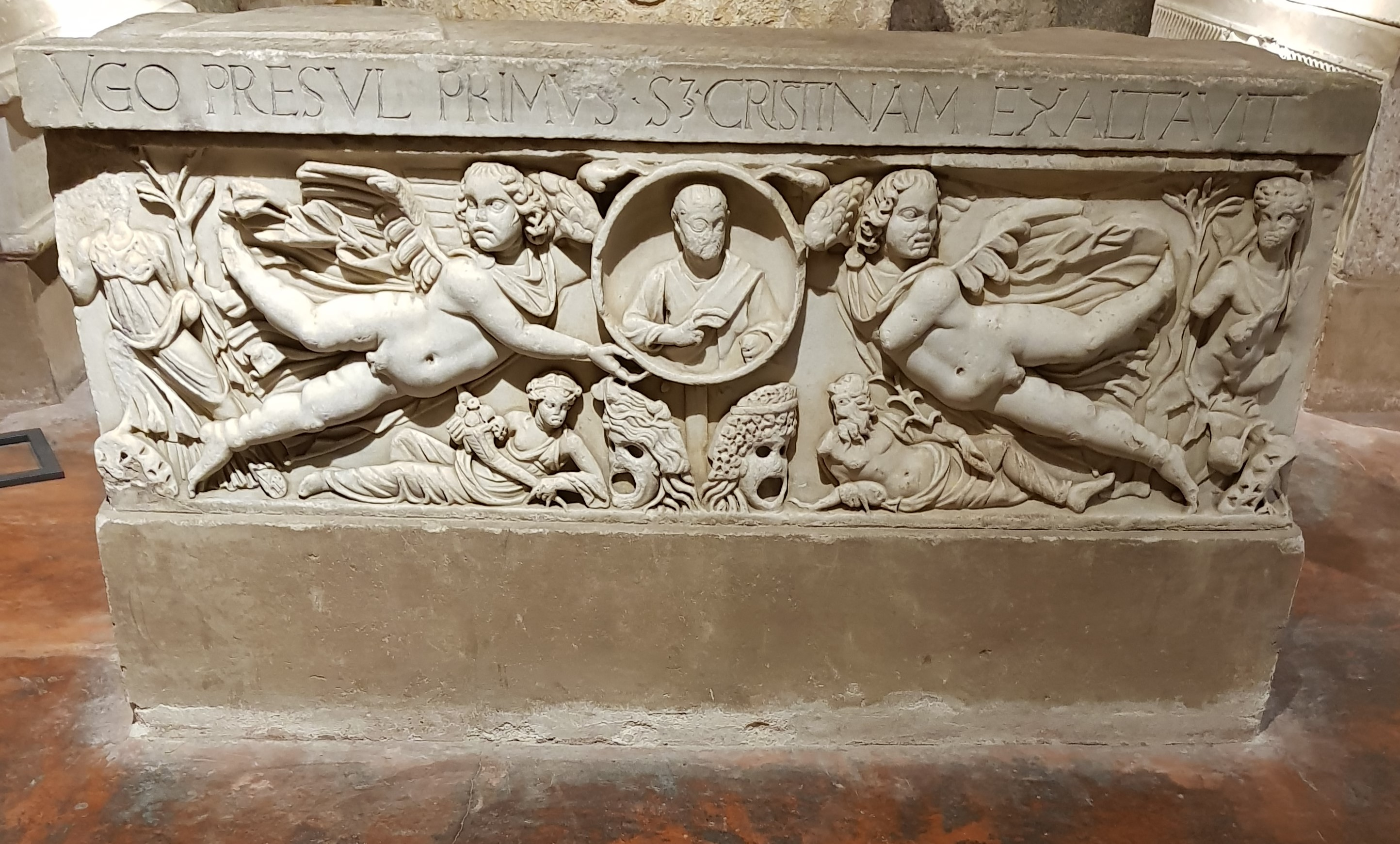
Tomb of archbishop Hugh in the Crypt of Palermo's Cathedral

Hugh (Italian: Ugo) was the Archbishop of Capua (as Hugh II) in the late 1140s and Archbishop of Palermo from 1150 until his death, probably in 1165–66.

Geoffrey, the former bishop of Dol, was appointed to the Capuan see about 1145. At some point after that and before 1150, Hugh became archbishop in Capua.

In 1150, pursuant to an agreement between King Roger II of Sicily and Pope Eugene III, Hugh was transferred from Capua to the see of Palermo. The previous archbishop-elect, Roger Fesca, is last recorded in March 1147. He had either died or been rejected in the interim. The transfer of Hugh formally took place at Ferentino in November. Eugene granted Hugh the pallium but refused to confirm the metropolitan authority previously granted to Palermo by the Antipope Anacletus II.

At Easter 1151, Hugh, using the authority of the pallium, consecrated Roger II's son William as co-king at Palermo. When Roger died in 1154, William succeeded him.

In 1155 rebels seized the castle of Butera and began raiding the Sicilian countryside. When inquiries were made, the rebels professed loyalty to the king and alleged that Archbishop Hugh was plotting with the Admiral Maio of Bari to overthrow William and install Maio as king. These claims are contradicted by the trust William placed in Hugh and Maio during his lengthy illness that year, from September to Christmas. Later, Hugh and Maio were among the negotiators of the Treaty of Benevento with Pope Adrian IV in 1156.

On the night of 10 November 1160, Maio was living the house of the archbishop, where Hugh lay ill, when he was attacked and killed by Matthew Bonnell.

The date of Hugh's death is uncertain. Archbishop Romuald II of Salerno officiated at the coronation of William II in May 1166, suggesting that at that time the see of Palermo was vacant. Falcandus implies that there had been repeated failed attempts to elect an archbishop to the vacant see before the election of Stephen du Perche in November 1167. This would seem to place Hugh's death several years earlier, whereas a donation of land to the archdiocese dated April 1145 shows that Palermo at that time still had an archbishop.

Hugh commissioned Latin translations of Greek works from Henry Aristippus, who was active in Palermo throughout the 1150s.
