= Jocelyn (disambiguation) =

Jocelyn is a surname and given name.

Jocelyn may also refer to:

- Jocelyn (1933 film), a French drama film
- Jocelyn (1952 film), a French film
- Jocelyn (opera), a 1888 opera by Benjamin Godard
- Jocelyn (Sicilian chancellor), an Italo-Norman officer serving Roger II of Sicily
- Jocelyn (album), a 1997 album by Jocelyn Enriquez
- "Josslyn", song by Olivia O'Brien
- Jocelyn, Ontario, Canada, a township
- Storm Jocelyn in the 2023–24 European windstorm season

== See also ==
- "Jocelyn Flores", song by XXXTentacion
