= Achard II of Lecce =

Achard II was the Norman count of Lecce (from before 1133) and Ostuni, both in southern Apulia, in today's southern Italy.

He was the son of Count Geoffrey II of Lecce and a descendant of one of the sons of Tancred of Hauteville, Geoffrey, arrived c. 1054, later count of Brindisi. His daughter Emma of Lecce (b. ca. 1120; d. 1194) had an affair with Roger, Duke of Apulia (b. 1118; d. 10 May 1148), son of Roger II of Sicily (b. 22 December 1095; d. 26 February 1154). His grandson, of this relationship, was later his heir and King Tancred (b. 1138; d. 20 February 1194).
