= Isabelle of Blois =

Isabelle of Blois or Elizabeth of Blois may refer to:

- Elizabeth of Blois, Duchess of Apulia (b. c. 1130), daughter of Theobald IV of Blois, later nun
- Isabelle of Chartres (d. 1248/9), daughter of Theobald V of Blois, countess of Chartres
