= Abu as-Salt =

Andalusian-Arab polymath, 1068–1134

Abū al-Ṣalt
- Born: c.1068 Dénia, Taifa of Dénia
- Died: 23 October 1134; Béjaïa, Hammadid dynasty

Academic work
- Era: Islamic Golden Age
- Main interests: Quadrivium, Astronomy, Music
- Influenced: Samuel of Marseilles, Profiat Duran

Abū aṣ-Ṣalt Umayya ibn ʿAbd al-ʿAzīz ibn Abī aṣ-Ṣalt ad-Dānī al-Andalusī (Arabic: أبو الصلت) (c. 1068 — 23 October 1134), known in Latin as Albuzale, was an Andalusian-Arab polymath who wrote about pharmacology, geometry, Aristotelian physics, and astronomy. His works on astronomical instruments were read both in the Islamic world and Europe. He also occasionally traveled to Palermo and worked in the court of Roger I of Sicily as a visiting physician. He became well known in Europe through translations of his works made in the Iberian Peninsula and in southern France. He is also credited with introducing Andalusi music to Tunis, which later led to the development of the Tunisian ma'luf.

== Life ==
Abu as-Salt was born in Dénia, al-Andalus. After the death of his father while he was a child, he became a student of al-Waqqashi (1017—1095) of Toledo (a colleague of Abū Ishāq Ibrāhīm az-Zarqālī). Upon completing his mathematical education in Seville, and because of the continuing conflicts during the reconquista, he set out with his family to Alexandria and then Cairo in 1096.

In Cairo, he entered the service of the Fatimid ruler Abū Tamīm Ma'add al-Mustanṣir bi-llāh and the Vizier Al-Afdal Shahanshah. His service continued until 1108, when, according to Ibn Abī Uṣaybiʿa, his attempt to retrieve a very large Felucca laden with copper, that had capsized in the Nile, ended in failure. Abu as-Salt had built a mechanical tool to retrieve the Felucca, and was close to success when the machine's silk ropes fractured. The Vizier Al-Afdal ordered Abu as-Salt's arrest, and he was imprisoned for more than three years, only to be released in 1112.

Abu al-Salt then left Egypt for Mahdia in Tunisia, the capital of the Zirids in Ifriqiya where he entered the service of king Yaḥyā ibn Tamīm as-Ṣanhājī and where his son, ʿAbd al-ʿAzīz was born. He also occasionally traveled to Palermo and worked in the court of Roger I of Sicily as a visiting physician. He also sent poems to the Palermitan poet Abū ḍ-Ḍawʾ. He died, probably of dropsy, in Béjaïa, Algeria. He is buried in the Ribat of Monastir, Tunisia.

== Works ==
Abu as-Salt wrote an encyclopedic work of many treatises on the scientific disciplines known as quadrivium. This work was probably known in Arabic as Kitāb al-kāfī fī al-ʿulūm. His poetry is preserved in the anthology of Imad al-Din al-Isfahani. His interests also included alchemy as well as the study of medicinal plants. He was keen to discover an elixir able to transmute copper into gold and tin into silver.

=== Astronomy ===
- Risāla fī al-amal bi-l-astrulab ("On the construction and use of the astrolabe")
- A description of the three instruments known as the Andalusian equatoria.
- Ṣifat ʿamal ṣafīḥa jāmiʿa taqawwama bi-hā jamīʿ al-kawākib al-sabʿa ("Description of the construction and Use of a Single Plate with which the totality of the motions of the seven planets"), where the seven planets refer to Mercury, Venus, earth, Moon, Mars, Jupiter, and Saturn.
- Kitāb al-wajīz fī ʿilm al-hayʾa ("Brief treatise on cosmology")
- Ajwiba ʿan masāʾil suʾila ʿan-ha fa-ajāba or Ajwiba ʿan masāʾil fī al-kawn wa-ʾl-ḥabīʿa wa-ʾl-ḥisāb ("Solution to questions on cosmology, physics, and arithmetic").
- An introduction to astronomy.
- A Summary of Ptolemy's Almagest.

=== Music ===
- Risāla fī l-musiqa ("Epistle about music") - a manuscript translated in Hebrew is kept in Paris

=== Medicine (pharmacobotany) ===
- Kitab al-adwiya al-mufrad - this book (known both by a 1311 Latin translation by Almado de Vilanova and a Hebrew translation by Yehuda Nathan) is unique in organizing drugs not by alphabetical order of the medicinal plants of which they are made, but by the part of the body they are used to cure.

=== Description of Egypt ===
- Risāla al-misriyya (Epistle about Egypt) a report written for the Zirid prince Yahya, precious for its description of 13th century Egypt

=== Logic ===
- Taqwim al-dhikr (assessing memory) a summary of Porphyry's Isagoge and the first four books of Aristotles' Organon. The manuscript has been translated in Spanish by C. Angel GONZALEZ PALENCIA.

== See also ==
- Roger I of Sicily
- Ibn Jubayr
- Muhammad al-Idrisi
- Ibn al-Saffar

== Notes ==
- Comes, Mercè (2007). "Abū al-Ṣalt: Umayya ibn ʿAbd al-ʿAzīz ibn Abī al-Ṣalt al-Dānī al-Andalusī". In Thomas Hockey; et al. (eds.). The Biographical Encyclopedia of Astronomers. New York: Springer. pp. 9–10. ISBN 978-0-387-31022-0. (PDF version)
