= John of Matera =

Benedictine monk

Saint John of Matera
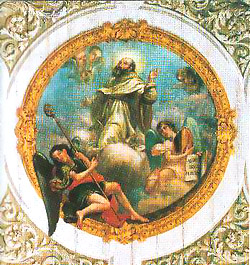
- John of Matera, Italian painting of the 18th century
- Born: 1070; Matera, Italy
- Died: 1139; Foggia, Italy
- Venerated in: Roman Catholic Church
- Feast: 20 June

John of Matera or Mathera, also known as John of Pulsano (Italian: San Giovanni da Matera) was a Benedictine monk.

== Life ==
John was born at Matera to a family of nobles. As a young man he moved to Taranto where he asked for hospitality and work from the Basilian monks of the Island of San Pietro. There he worked as a shepherd. Due to some misunderstandings with the monks, he left the islet and went to Calabria and then to Sicily, continuing to live a life of penance and renunciation.

He remained there for two years before moving to Apulia, where he stayed with relatives. He founded a small monastic community in Ginosa, where he made himself known as a preacher in the area and attracted the admiration of many. He made many enemies by his upright life and was eventually imprisoned because of false calumnies. He was miraculously freed from his chains.

After meeting and spending some time with the hermit William of Vercelli at Bagnoli, he decided to go to Palestine. Around 1127 while passing through Bari, he realised that his mission had to take place there. He was rescued from prison by Grimoald, Prince of Bari, who ordered him to give an account of his theology to prove his orthodoxy. He preached under Grimoald in Bari.

He went on to Gargano, and there around 1130, near Pulsano, in a solitary valley he started a new community with six disciples. They followed the Benedictine Rule with a strong concentration on manual labour. In six months, the community had grown to sixty monks and acquired great fame. The monastic congregation known as the "Scalzi" grew in size, receiving bequests and land, so another house was opened near the church of St. James in Foggia and then a monastery in Meleda in Dalmatia opposite the coast of the Gargano.

His alternate name comes from his foundation of the monastery of Saint Mary of Pulsano, of which he was the first abbot. John died in Foggia on 20 June 1139 and canonized by Pope Alexander III in 1177. In 1830 his relics were translated to Matera Cathedral, where they remain.

He is remembered on 20 June and is portrayed as an abbot driving the devil away with a rod.

== Sources ==
- La Città dell'Uomo.it: Vita di San Giovanni di Matera (in Italian)
- Patron Saints Index
- Caravale, Mario (ed.), 2003: Dizionario Biografico degli Italiani. Rome
