= Sibylla of Conversano =

Duchess of Normandy from 1100 to 1103

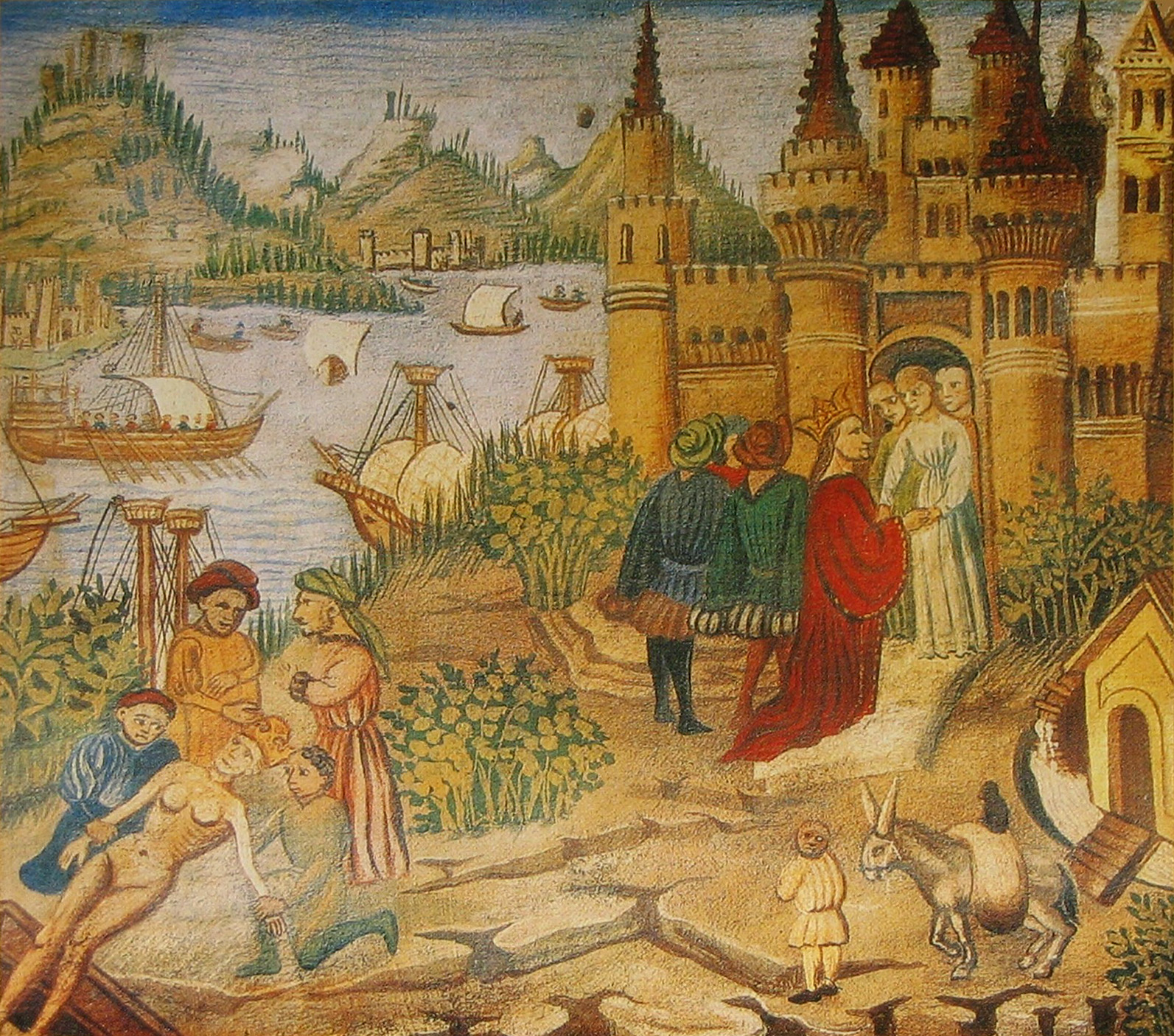

Duchess consort of Normandy
- Tenure: 1100–1103
- Born: c. 1080; Duchy of Apulia
- Died: 18 March 1103; Rouen
- Spouse: Robert Curthose (1100-her death)
- Issue: William Clito
- House: Hauteville
- Father: Geoffrey, Count of Conversano
- Mother: Sichelgaita of Moulins

Sibylla of Conversano (Note: The spelling Sibylla (after sibyl) is from Hollister. The spelling Sybilla is also sometimes seen.) (d. 18 March 1103) was a wealthy Norman heiress, Duchess of Normandy by marriage to Robert Curthose. She was regent of Normandy during the absence of her spouse.

== Life ==
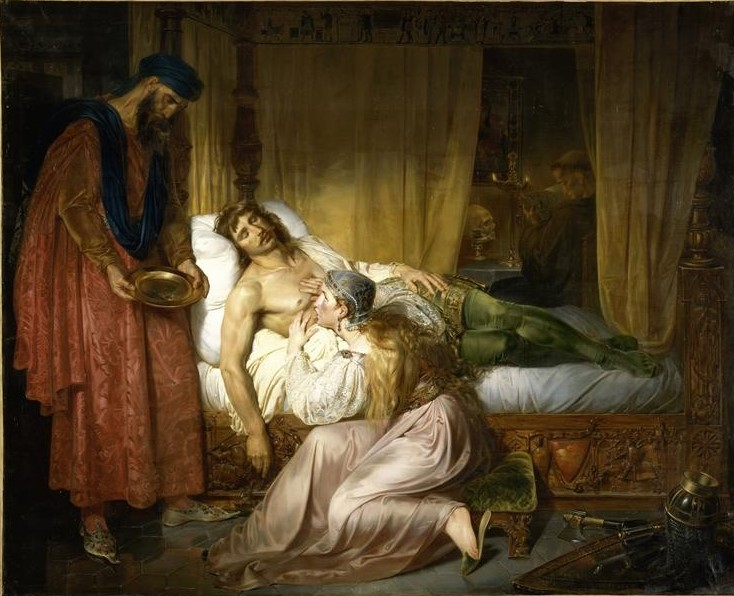
Devotion of the Princess Sibylla (Félix Auvray, 1832), based on a legend: Curthose is wounded in the Crusades by a poisoned arrow, and Sibylla sucks the poison from the wound, giving her life to save his.

She was the daughter of Geoffrey of Brindisi, Count of Conversano, and his wife Sichelgaita of Moulins, and a grandniece of Robert Guiscard.

During the winter of 1096-97 while Robert Curthose was in Apulia awaiting transport on the First Crusade, he probably began negotiations to marry the heiress, Sibyl of Conversano. Orderic Vitalis claims Robert 'fell in love' with Sibyl and further the chronicler called her 'truly good in character' and also wrote she was 'endowed with many virtues and lovable to all who knew her'. (Note: This is somewhat uncharacteristic of Orderic to speak in praise of an aristocratic woman in this manner. See: Marjorie Chibnall, "Women in Orderic Vitalis', The Haskins Society Journal Studies in Medieval History, Volume 2 (1990), pp. 105-21.)

On Robert's return from the Crusade he married Sibylla in Apulia in 1100.

Shortly after returning to Normandy, Robert and Sibylla undertook a pilgrimage to Mont Saint-Michel to give thanks for his safe return from the Crusade.

It is clear that writers of the time were quite taken with Sibylla, praising both her beauty and intelligence.

During Curthose's absence, Robert of Torigni noted that the new duchess administered Normandy better than the duke did. On 25 October 1102, their son was born. He was named William for William, Archbishop of Rouen who presided over his baptism, this according to Orderic. William of Malmesbury suggested he was named after his grandfather, William the Conqueror.

On 18 March 1103, less than six months after the birth of her only child, she died at Rouen, Caux, and was buried, amid universal sorrow, in the cathedral church, Archbishop William Bonne-Ame performing the funeral rites. Sibylla was admired and often praised by chroniclers of the time; William of Malmesbury claims she died as a result of binding her breasts too tightly while both Robert of Torigny and Orderic Vitalis suggest she was murdered by a group of noblewomen led by her husband's mistress, Agnes de Ribemont. (Note: Agnes de Ribemont was the widow of Walter Giffard, 1st Earl of Buckingham, and the sister of Anselm of Ribemont, who had died on crusade. It remains unclear if or when she and Robert even had an affair, but the story goes that she promised that if he would marry her he'd have the support of her powerful family. William of Malmsebury loved a good story, even if untrue; and in one version of his Gesta Regum, he credits Sibylla's death to Robert's "mistress", and in a later version he stated "mid-wife". However plausible it may have been that she was Robert's mistress, it remains less than plausible that Robert allowed his new wife, the mother of his infant son, to be poisoned while he sat idly by. Orderic may have seen such a story as further evidence Robert Curthose was unfit to rule Normandy. See: William M. Aird, Robert Curthose Duke of Normandy (Woodbridge: The Boydell Press, 2008), pp. 213-14. The mysterious story also has a chronological problem in that Agnes de Ribemont may not even have been a widow at the time of Sibylla's death. See: Charles Wendell David, Robert Curthose (1920) pp. 146-7. According to Europäische Stammtäfeln, III/4, Tafel 695, Walter died 15 July 1102.)

== Issue ==
Robert and Sibylla had one son:

- William Clito (1102—27 July 1128), Count of Flanders.

== Notes ==
Preceded by Matilda of Flanders	Duchess consort of Normandy; 1100–1102	Succeeded by Matilda of Scotland
