= Ibn Bashrun =

Arabic poet

ʿAbd al-Raḥīm ibn ʿAbd al-Razzāq ibn Jaʿfar ibn Bashrūn, called al-Ṣiqillī (the Sicilian), was an Arabic poet from Mahdia who spent much of his life in Sicily. He was a court poet of King Roger II (1130–1154) and compiled an anthology of verse, Al-Mukhtār fī al-naẓm wa-l-nathr li-afāḍil ahl al-ʿaṣr (Selected Prose and Verse from the Noblest People of the Age).

The anthology of ʿImād al-Dīn al-Iṣfahānī contains a single qaṣīda from a longer poem by Ibn Bashrūn. In his standard fashion, ʿImād al-Dīn cut it short because it was a panegyric for an infidel. It refers to Roger as "king of the Caesars" or "king of imperial kings" (malik al-mulūk al-qayṣarīya). The passage selected by ʿImād al-Dīn describes a palace, gardens and a menagerie as indicators of Roger's power:

Oh, what a garden of victory,
that overflows with radiant beauty
And its castle, handsome in construction,
with its [imposing] appearance and its lofty galleries,
With its wild animals and its waters
like the finest fountains of paradise
Already its gardens have burst into bloom,
from amongst them emerge radiant robes

== Bibliography ==
- ʿAbbās, Iḥsān (1994). A Biographical Dictionary of Sicilian Learned Men and Poets. Beirut: Dar al-Gharb al-Islarni.
- Amari, Michele (1880). Biblioteca arabo-sicula. Vol. 2. Turin. pp. 438–439.
- Houben, Hubert (2002). Roger II of Sicily: A Ruler Between East and West. Cambridge: Cambridge University Press.
- Mallette, Karla (2005). The Kingdom of Sicily, 1100–1250: A Literary History. Philadelphia: University of Pennsylvania Press.
- Miller, Nathaniel A. (2019). "Muslim Poets under a Christian King: An Intertextual Reevaluation of Sicilian Arabic Literature under Roger II (1112–54) (Part I)". Mediterranean Studies. 27 (2): 182–209. doi:10.5325/mediterraneanstu.27.2.0182. JSTOR 10.5325/mediterraneanstu.27.2.0182. S2CID 213548917.
- Miller, Nathaniel A. (2020). "Muslim Poets under a Christian King: An Intertextual Reevaluation of Sicilian Arabic Literature under Roger II (1112–54) (Part II)". Mediterranean Studies. 28 (1): 50–87. doi:10.5325/mediterraneanstu.28.1.0050.
