= Grimoald, Prince of Bari =

Grimoald Alferanites was the prince of Bari from 1121 to 1132.

After a civil war broke out in Bari, Risone, the archbishop of the city, was murdered (1117) and the princess of Taranto, Constance of France, was imprisoned at Giovinazzo (1119) by Grimoald and Alexander, Count of Conversano. Pope Callistus II intervened to procure the release of Princess Constance in 1120, who recognised her captor in his later titles. During this conflict, Grimoald was elected ruler in 1121, in opposition to William II, Duke of Apulia, the proper legal suzerain of Bari. He first used the title dominus or dominator, as in barensium dominator in October 1121. In June 1123, a Byzantine-inspired blue diploma with gold script calls him Grimoaldus Alferanites gratia Dei et beati Nikolai barensis princeps.

In May 1122, he entered into an alliance with the Republic of Venice. In October 1127, he was drawn to the side of Roger II of Sicily in his claim to the Apulian succession. However, in 1129, Grimoald and several other notable barons in Apulia flew into revolt after the papal approval of Roger's title by Pope Honorius II. With a fleet of sixty ships, George of Antioch blockaded the Bariot harbour and besieged Grimoald for months from Spring to August, when the prince finally gave in. Nevertheless, Grimoald was granted a full pardon from Roger and confirmed in his own chosen princely title. When, the next year (1130), Roger sought the royal title, receiving an honour higher than that of prince (as the rulers of Capua and Bari held) was one of his many motives.

Joined with Tancred of Conversano, an old ally and renegade, Grimoald rose up in revolt in 1131 and captured the port of Brindisi at Christmastime. It took until May 1132, after astronomic omens and papal urgings, for Roger to leave comfortable Sicily to go and deal with insurrection in Apulia. A brief siege convinced the Bariots to give up their prince and Grimoald and his whole family were given over on the city's surrender. The deposed prince was brought with his family to prison in Sicily and Tancred was only forgiven on condition he leave on Crusade. Grimoald was replaced by Roger's own son, Tancred.

According to Falco of Benevento, Grimoald was a vir mirabilis et bellicosi spiritus and Orderic Vitalis calls him liberalem et strenuum virum. It seems, from the dating of the events, that the prince of Bari who rescued the saintly Giovanni di Matera from prison and then demanded that the holy man give an account of his theology to prove its orthodoxy was Grimoald. He was known to have tight control over his own churches and was a great patron of the Church of Saint Nicholas which housed the relics of Saint Nicholas, whom he championed as a Bariot patron saint, as seen in his official title.

| Preceded by none | Prince of Bari; 1121–1132 | Succeeded by Tancred |

== Sources ==
- Norwich, John Julius. The Normans in the South 1016-1130. Longman: London, 1967.
- Norwich, John Julius. The Kingdom in the Sun 1130-1194. Longman: London, 1970.
- Caravale, Mario (ed). Dizionario Biografico degli Italiani. Rome, 2003.
