= Jaquintus, Prince of Bari =

Jaquintus was the prince (excellentissimus princeps) of Bari from the death of Tancred, the son of Roger II of Sicily, in 1138 to his own death the next year.

Jaquintus rebelled against the king and Roger besieged the city for two months before famine forced the citizens to surrender. Jaquintus signed a surrender to prevent pillage and prisoners were exchanged. However, a man of Roger's allegiance was freed from prison and claimed to have had one eye put out. Roger summoned jurists from Troia and Trani to pronounced the treaty null. Jaquintus and ten of his leading men, perhaps more, were then hanged. The semi-independent principality of Bari was quashed.

== Sources ==
- Norwich, John Julius. The Kingdom in the Sun 1130-1194. Longman: London, 1970.

Preceded by Tancred	Prince of Bari; 1138–1139	Extinguished
