= Geoffrey, Count of Conversano =

Italo-Norman nobleman

Geoffrey of Conversano
- Count of Conversano
- Successor: Alexander of Conversano
- Born: c. 1040
- Died: 1100
- Spouse: Sichelgaita of Moulins
- Issue more: Robert of Conversano; Alexander of Conversano; Tancred of Conversano; Sybil of Conversano
- Mother: daughter of Tancred of Hauteville

Geoffrey the Elder (died September 1100) was an Italo-Norman nobleman. A nephew of Robert Guiscard through a unknown sister, he was the count of Conversano from 1072 and the lord of Brindisi and Nardò from 1070, until his death.

== Biography ==
The identity of Geoffrey's parents is unknown, but it is believed that his mother was a daughter of Tancred of Hauteville and it has been speculated that his father was Armand of Mortain. According to Goffredo Malaterra, Geoffrey conquered most of his lands with his own energy (sua strenuitate) and without the help of Robert Guiscard. Thus, when, in 1067, Guiscard demanded homage for the castle of Montepeloso, Geoffrey refused. Robert brought him to heel in the subsequent war and Geoffrey did homage. Among the other lands Geoffrey had conquered from the Byzantines were Polignano and Monopoli.

Geoffrey joined his cousins Abelard and Herman, his brother Robert, and Henry, Count of Monte Sant'Angelo in the rebellion of 1079–1082, while the Guiscard was away fighting the Byzantine Empire in the Balkans. His brother died in July 1080 and Abelard a year later. While he was besieging Oria, a city on the Via Appia between Brindisi and Taranto, Robert returned at Otranto and began to march towards him. Geoffrey, though he had numerous troops, fled anyway.

By 1083, Geoffrey was reconciled to Robert Guiscard and accompanied him on his final Byzantine expedition. After Guiscard's death in 1085, Geoffrey became the vassal of Guiscard's son Roger Borsa, although a troublesome one. In 1088 Roger had to cede this vassalage to his older, disinherited brother Bohemond of Taranto after he had waged a successful campaign against Roger, thus gaining also access to Brindisi. Geoffrey was present at the synod held in Melfi in 1089 but did not participate in Bohemond's contingent during the First Crusade.

Geoffrey hosted in the winter of 1099/1100 the returning crusader Robert Curthose, duke of Normandy, who had gained considerable reputation due to the success of the First Crusade which most likely also played a role in convincing Geoffrey to marry his daughter Sybil to Robert. It is likely that Robert had met Sybil in the winter of 1096/97 while on the way to the Holy Land and, according to Orderic Vitalis, had fallen in love with her.

Geoffrey died, most likely in Brindisi, in February 1104 or April 1107. He was a patron of the local monasteries and seems to have been fairly wealthy as his dowry enabled at least partially Robert Curthose to redeem his duchy which he had loaned to his brother William Rufus in order to finance his expedition.

== Marriage and issue ==
Geoffrey was married to Sichelgaita of Moulins, daughter of Rudolf of Moulins, the count of Boiano, and Alferada of Guardia. They had three sons and a daughter: Robert, Alexander, Tancred, and Sybilla, who married Robert Curthose, Duke of Normandy.

Preceded by New creation	Count of Conversano; 1072–1100	Succeeded by Alexander
