= Elvira of Castile, Queen of Sicily =

Queen of Sicily from 1130 to 1135

Elvira of Castile
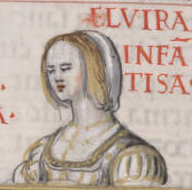

Queen consort of Sicily
- Tenure: 1130 – 8 February 1135
- Born: c. 1100
- Died: 6 February 1135
- Spouse: Roger II, King of Sicily
- Issue: Roger III, Duke of Apulia; Tancred, Prince of Bari; William I, King of Sicily; Alfonso, Prince of Capua; Adelisia, Duchess of Florence; Henry, Prince of Taranto
- House: Jiménez
- Father: Alfonso VI, King of León and Castile
- Mother: Isabella (possibly Zaida of Seville)

Elvira of Castile (c. 1100 – 6 February 1135) was a member of the House of Jiménez and the first Queen of Sicily as the wife of Roger II of Sicily.

Elvira was a legitimate daughter of Alfonso VI, king of León and Castile. Her mother was King Alfonso VI's fourth wife, Isabella. This Isabella is likely identical to Zaida of Seville, the Arab princess from the Abbadid dynasty who was Alfonso's mistress before marrying him. Other historians have argued that she was a French princess. Growing up at her father's court in the multiconfessional city of Toledo, Elvira must have been accustomed to a significant level of convivencia, which was present in Sicily as well.

In 1117 or 1118, Elvira married Roger II, then count of Sicily and king from 1130. Sicily too had a sizeable Muslim population, and the marriage was part of Roger's plan to emulate the religious policy of Elvira's father. Elvira's likely descent from the Muslim rulers of Al-Andalus exemplifies a "pattern of cultural association" between the queens of Sicily and the Islamic world. She may have even influenced the extensive cultivation of Islamic art during her husband's reign.

There is exceptionally little information about Queen Elvira. She does not appear to have been active in politics or as a church patron, and is chiefly remembered for giving birth to Roger's six children. Elvira and Roger had six children:

- Roger III (1118 – 12 May 1148), heir, Duke of Apulia (from 1135), possibly also Count of Lecce.
- Tancred (1120–1138), Prince of Bari (from 1135).
- William I (1120/1121 – 7 May 1166), his successor, Duke of Apulia (from 1148).
- Alfonso (1122 – 10 October 1144), Prince of Capua (from 1135) and Duke of Naples.
- Adelisia (1126 - post 1184), regnant duchess of Florence. She married firstly Jocelyn, Count of Loreto, and secondly Robert III, Count of Loritello.
- Henry (1130 - 1143), prince of Taranto.

In 1135, both Roger and Elvira fell ill. The illness was grave and infectious. The king survived, but the queen died on 6 February. Roger was devastated by her death; he withdrew to his room and refused to see anyone except his closest servants. Eventually rumors spread that he too had died. Roger remained a widower for fourteen years and remarried only in 1149, as he had outlived four out of the five sons he had had with Elvira.

== Notes ==
Royal titles
New title	Queen consort of Sicily; 1130 – 8 February 1135	Vacant Title next held by Sibylla of Burgundy
