= Galluccio =

- Comune
- Comune di Galluccio
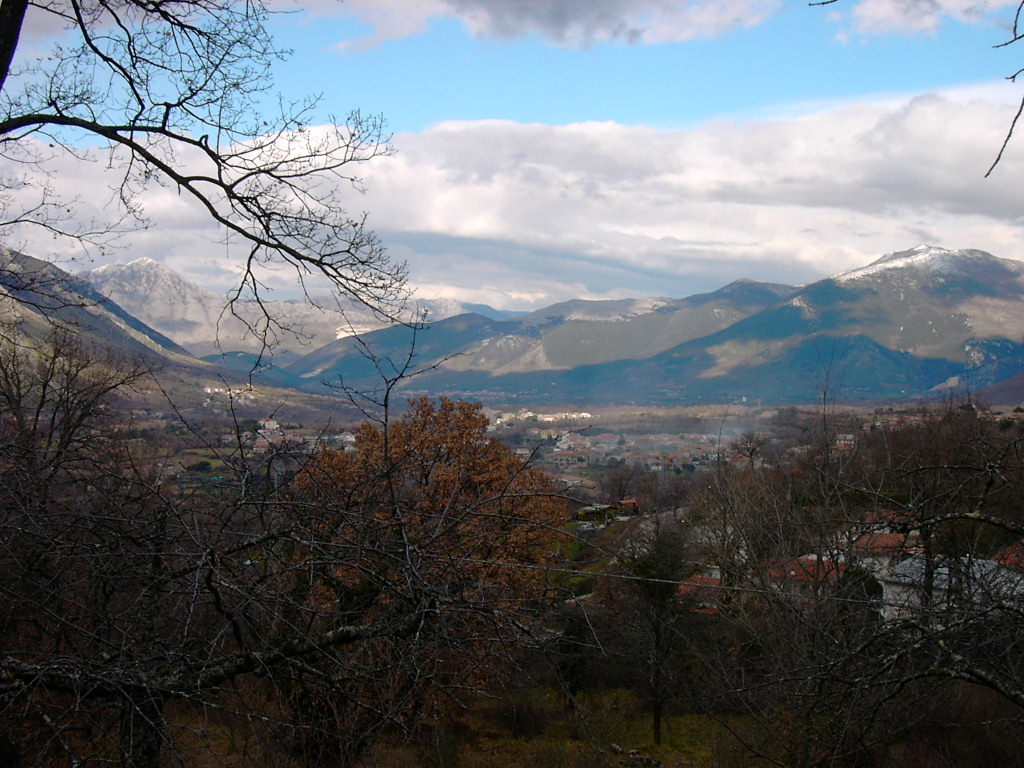

- Coat of arms

- Location within Italy Location within Campania
- Coordinates: 41°21′N 13°57′E
- Country: Italy
- Region: Campania
- Province: Caserta (CE)
- Frazioni: Calabritto, Campo, Mieli, San Clemente, Sipicciano, Vaglie

Government
  - Mayor: Francesco Lepore

Area
  - Total: 32.0 km^{2} (12.4 sq mi)
- Elevation: 368 m (1,207 ft)

Population (31 December 2010)
  - Total: 2,275
  - Density: 71.1/km^{2} (184/sq mi)
- Demonym: Gallucciani
- Time zone: UTC+1 (CET)
  - Summer (DST): UTC+2 (CEST)
- Postal code: 81044
- Dialing code: 0823
- Website: Official website

Galluccio is a comune (municipality) in the Province of Caserta in the Italian region Campania, located about 60 kilometres (37 mi) northwest of Naples and about 45 kilometres (28 mi) northwest of Caserta. It is at the feet of the southern slopes of Monte Camino.

== History ==
Prehistoric findings have been excavated in the area, but the first known inhabitants of Galluccio were, in historic times, the Aurunci. When they were defeated by the Romans, they founded a colony here, which, according to tradition, took its name from one Trebonius Gallus. In the early Middle Ages, the Saracens built here a stronghold, as testified by a locality called "Saraceni". After their defeat, in 915, the area was acquired by the Princes of Capua.

At Galluccio in 1139, Roger III, Duke of Apulia ambushed Pope Innocent II and his light body of troops with only a thousand knights. The pope and his entourage were captured. Three days later on 25 July, by the Treaty of Mignano Innocent confirmed Roger II of Sicily as King, Roger III as Duke, and Alfonso of Hauteville.

The local feudataries, also called Galluccio, held the town until 1480. In that year, King Ferdinand I of Naples gave it to Rossetto Fieramosca, and Galluccio was subsequently inherited by the condottiero Ettore Fieramosca. In 1504 it went to Gonzalo Fernández de Córdoba, who sold it in 1543 to Dorotea Spinelli.
