= Treaty of Mignano =

1139 peace treaty

The Treaty of Mignano of 1139 was the treaty which ended more than a decade of constant war in the Italian Mezzogiorno following the union of the mainland duchy of Apulia and Calabria with the County of Sicily in 1127.

In 1130, Antipope Anacletus II had crowned Roger II king. The legitimate pope, Innocent II, did not recognise this title and many of Roger's peninsular vassals took exception to his exercising royal authority over them. Over the decade of the 1130s, Roger defeated his vassals one by one until in 1137, the Emperor Lothair II came down with the pope and conquered most of the south. Lothair's death deprived the southern barons of their support, however, and Roger quickly reconquered his territories. In 1139 the papal-imperial duke of Apulia, Ranulf of Alife, died.

Innocent and the dispossessed Prince Robert II of Capua marched to reassert their authority. At Galluccio, Roger's son ambushed the papal troops with only a thousand knights and captured the pope and his entourage. Three days later, on 25 July at Mignano, Innocent confirmed the elder Roger as rex Siciliae ducatus Apuliae et principatus Capuae and invested him with his titles. He also invested Roger's son as duke of Apulia, and another son, Alfonso, as prince of Capua.

In 1143, Innocent refused to recognise the treaty, but Roger sent Robert of Selby to march on papal Benevento. Mignano was reaffirmed. In 1156, by the Treaty of Benevento, the tribute to the pope of 600 schifati agreed upon by Roger II in 1139 was affirmed and another 400 schifati was added for newly conquered lands.

== See also ==
- List of treaties

== Sources ==
- Chalandon, Ferdinand (1926). "The Norman Kingdom of Sicily". In Tanner, J.R.; Previte-Orton, C.W.; Brooke, Z.N. (eds.). The Cambridge Medieval History: Contest of empire and papacy. Cambridge University Press. p. 184-207.
- Mann, Horace Kinder; Hollnsteiner, Johannes (1902). The Lives of the Popes in the Early Middle Ages. Vol. 9. Harvard University Press.
- Matthew, Donald (1992). The Norman kingdom of Sicily. Cambridge University Press.
- Pacaut, Marcel (2002). "Innocent II". In Levillain, Philippe (ed.). The Papacy: An Encyclopedia. Vol. 2: Gaius-Proxies. Routledge. p. 783-785.
- Wiedemann, Benedict (2022). Papal Overlordship and European Princes, 1000-1270. Oxford University Press.
- Wieruszowski, Helene (1971). Politics and culture in medieval Spain and Italy. Edizioni di storia e letteratura.
