= Thomas Brun =

English courtier in 12th century Sicily

Thomas Brun, also le Brun or Brown, was son or nephew of William Brun (first to bear the name Le Brun), a clerk of Henry I of England. He travelled to Sicily as a child in the entourage of Robert of Selby about the year 1130. He first appears in a document in Sicily in 1137.

Thomas was a kaid, or magister, of the royal Diwan throughout the reign of Roger II, whose favour he certainly had. His name appears in many official documents and it was probably he who drafted the foundation charter of the Cappella Palatina. He is known to have had a secretary named Othman, named in an Arabic source. He appears in charters in Latin, Greek, and Arabic. The Greek transcription of his name and title was μαστρο Θωμα του Βρουνου.

Upon the succession of William I in 1154, Thomas was removed from office (possibly by the Emir Maio of Bari) and returned to England. There he became the almoner to Henry II.

== Sources ==
- Norwich, John Julius. The Kingdom in the Sun 1130-1194. London: Longmans, 1970.
