= Robert of Selby =

English courtier in 12th century Sicily

Robert of Selby (or Salebia) (died 1152) was an Englishman, a courtier of Roger II and chancellor of the Kingdom of Sicily. It is likely that his name indicates that he was from Selby in Yorkshire. He probably journeyed to Sicily about 1130. In his train was Thomas Brun.

In 1137, he was appointed governor of Campania shortly before Salerno, the capital of Campania, was besieged by Count Ranulf of Alife, Duke Henry the Proud, and Prince Robert II of Capua, with the troops of the Emperor Lothair II. Robert stayed in Salerno to defend the city while Roger was in the island capital Palermo. With the cause hopeless, Robert advised the city to surrender and beg imperial protection to prevent a sack by the eager Pisans. The citizens did so and Robert of Selby left to organise the defence of the rest of the province.

In 1143, when Pope Innocent II refused to recognise the Treaty of Mignano, Robert of Selby marched on papal Benevento. The Beneventans argued that their royal charter was being violated, whereupon Robert entered the palace and the charter was never seen again.

In Summer 1144, Pope Lucius II was barred from Rome by the senatores and the patricius Giordano Pierleoni. He failed in his negotiations with Roger at Ceprano. Robert of Selby led expeditions against the ill-defended Papal States. Lucius' successor, Pope Eugene III, was invited back after the deposition of Giordano, but forced out again in March 1146. Late in 1149, Robert of Selby led him back into the Lateran with a Sicilian troop.

Robert of Selby probably acted as a sort of guardian for the young duke of Apulia, Roger, the son of Roger II. According to John of Hexham, writing in 1147, Robert was "the most influential of the King's friends, a man of great wealth and loaded with honours." Likewise, in his Policraticus, VII.19, John of Salisbury calls him "an able administrator . . . feared by all because of his influence with the Prince, and respected for the elegance of his life . . ." A modern opinion is that of John Julius Norwich: "Robert's administrative methods were as unorthodox as his way of life. He emerges as a far more cheerful and extrovert character than his master. . ." An incident in the Policraticus, records Robert negotiating three large bribes from three candidates for the vacant see of Avella—and promptly disclosing the simony to an assembly of bishops, who elected a worthy abbot instead. Robert collected the bribes nevertheless.

== Sources ==
- Norwich, John Julius. The Kingdom in the Sun 1130-1194. Longman: London, 1970.
- Matthew, Donald (1992). The Norman Kingdom of Sicily. Cambridge University Press.
- Houben, Hubert. Roger II of Sicily: A Ruler between East and West. Trans. G. A. Loud and Diane Milbourne. Cambridge University Press: 2002.
