= Evelyn Jamison =

British historian

Evelyn Mary Jamison
- Born: 24 February 1877
- Died: 9 May 1972 (aged 95)
- Occupation: Medievalist
- Parent(s): Arthur Andrew Jamison, Isabella Green
- Awards: Serena Medal, 1940

Academic background
- Education: Lady Margaret Hall, British School at Rome

Academic work
- Discipline: Historian
- Sub-discipline: Norman Sicily
- Institutions: Somerville College, Oxford
- Notable students: Marjorie Chibnall

Evelyn Mary Jamison (24 February 1877 – 9 May 1972) was a British medievalist who devoted herself mainly to the study of the history of the Normans in Sicily. She was vice-principal and tutor of Lady Margaret Hall, Oxford from 1921 to 1937.

== Life ==
Jamison was born in 1877, the eldest of three children of Arthur Andrew Jamison, a doctor, and his wife Isabella Green (whose mother, Mary Brandreth Green, was a friend of the novelist Elizabeth Gaskell).

Evelyn Jamison attended Francis Holland School, in London between 1890 and 1895, from where she gained a place at Oxford to study modern History. Her recollections of her time at Francis Holland were published.

After studying art in Paris, she entered Lady Margaret Hall in 1898 to study Modern History. Graduating in 1901, she was made a research fellow at Somerville College in 1903, and the first beneficiary of the Lady Margaret Research Fellowship, established the previous year by Principal Agnes Maitland. This enabled her to travel to Italy, studying at the British School at Rome. In 1907 she returned to Lady Margaret Hall, initially as librarian and bursar, and subsequently as assistant history tutor. From 1921 to 1937 she was history tutor and vice-principal of Lady Margaret, and from 1928 to 1935 University Lecturer in History. Among her students was the historian Marjorie Chibnall. She authored several works of history, which were notable for including previously unpublished archival material from the Norman Kingdom of Sicily. Her final work, an edition of the Catalogus Baronum, was completed after her death by Errico Cuozzo.

After Jamison's death, several of her friends dedicated in her memory a new stone effigy of Lady Margaret Beaufort, namesake of Lady Margaret Hall, installed in the college chapel to replace an earlier, and by then deteriorated, plaster one.

== Works ==
- The Norman Administration of Apulia and Capua, more Especially under Roger II and William I, 1127-1166 , in: Papers of the British School at Rome 6 (1913) 211- 481; Reprint of the Edition 1913, edited by Dione Clementi and Theo Kölzer, Aalen 1987
- Studies on the History of Medieval Sicily and South Italy, edited by Dione Clementi. Aalen 1992
- Admiral Eugenius of Sicily, His Life and Work and the Authorship of the Epistola ad Petrum and the Historia Hugonis Falcandi Siculi, London 1957
- Judex Tarentinus. Aalen 1992
- Catalogus Baronum, Rom 1972 (Fonti per la storia d'Italia; 101)
