= Alfonso of Capua =

Prince of Capua from 1135 to 1144

Alfonso ruled Capua (pink) and Naples (blue), and extended Sicilian authority into the south of the Duchy of Spoleto (purple), conquering Pescara.

Alfonso, also called Anfuso or Anfusus (c. 1120 – 10 October 1144), was the Prince of Capua from 1135 and Duke of Naples from 1139. He was an Italian-born Norman of the noble Hauteville family. After 1130, when his father Roger became King of Sicily, he was the third in line to the throne; second in line after the death of an older brother in 1138. He was the first Hauteville prince of Capua after his father conquered the principality from the rival Norman Drengot family. He was also the first Norman duke of Naples after the duchy fell vacant on the death of the last Greek duke. He also expanded his family's power northwards, claiming lands also claimed by the Papacy, although he was technically a vassal of the Pope for his principality of Capua.

== Early life ==
Alfonso was the third son of Count Roger II of Sicily, who became king in 1130, and his first wife, Elvira of Castile. He was probably named after his maternal grandfather, King Alfonso VI of Castile, but contemporary sources invariably use the spellings Anfusus, Anphusus or Amphusus. According to Alexander of Telese, in August 1135 Alfonso was a mere "boy" (puer) too young to be knighted alongside his brothers Roger (died 1148) and Tancred (died 1138). While the Latin term puer might refer to a man up to the age of 28, Alfonso was less than sixteen years old, the age at which a boy was knighted in medieval Sicily. He was also older than two other brothers, William and Henry, described as infantes (infants), that is, under fourteen. Alfonso's birth therefore took place around 1120.

After the refusal of Prince Robert II of Capua to submit to King Roger in June 1135, Roger declared him deposed and in October appointed Alfonso to the principality, "with the support of all the best knights". (Note: In Latin, cum favore optimis militisque omnium.) To underline the royal authority, Roger and his sons made a solemn entry into Capua and had the principality's vassals swear fealty to their new prince and to their king and his heir. In this way, the traditional principalities of southern Italy nominally retained their autonomy, but as integral parts of the kingdom, royal appanages. Roger's chancellor Guarin, who had administered Capua on behalf of Roger since royal troops had occupied it in 1134, continued to administer on behalf of the young Alfonso. After Guarin, Robert of Selby was appointed to administer Capua until Alfonso came of age. He was still governing there during the imperial invasion of 1137, when the army of the German emperor Lothair II briefly occupied Capua and reinstated Prince Robert.

== Administration of Capua and Naples ==
On 25 July 1139, in a meeting at Mignano, Pope Innocent II finally recognised Roger as King of Sicily, in exchange Roger accepted Innocent as his feudal lord. The pope also recognised Alfonso as Prince of Capua and invested him with a banner. Although the granting of a banner implied that Capua was a direct fief of the papacy, in fact it was an arrière-fief. Alfonso was a vassal of his father, who was a vassal of the pope. Nonetheless, after receiving his papal investiture Alfonso took personal charge of his principality.

In 1137, Duke Sergius VII of Naples died and his duchy fell vacant. In 1139, the Neapolitans made their submission to King Roger at Benevento on papal territory. The contemporary historian Falco of Benevento records how "in those days the citizens of Naples came to Benevento, and bringing the city of Naples to the fealty of the Lord King they took his son [to be their] duke, and submitted their necks to his [Alfonso's] fealty." (Note: In Latin, et in his diebus cives Neapolitani venerunt Beneventum, et civitatem Neapolim ad fidelitatem Domini Regis tradentes Ducem filium ejus duxerunt, et ejus fidelitati colla submittunt.) This took place in July 1139. The acquisition of Naples and the papal banner occurred around the same time, and Alfonso thus became the ruler of two small principalities at about the age of nineteen.

Alfonso did not initially control the revenues of his principality, which were overseen by a royal chamberlain, Jocelin. It is also unclear what judicial authority he exercised. His principality corresponded to a single circuit of royal justiciars, the later Terra di Lavoro. The original justiciars, Archbishop-elect William of Capua and Lord Hamo of Arienzo, (Note: Hamo (Aymo de Argincia) had been a courtier under Prince Jordan II of Capua in 1120.) were appointed in 1135. Later evidence from the reign of King Tancred, suggests that the prince of Capua had supreme judicial authority in his province. Alfonso was only intermittently resident in Capua, and he often visited Sicily. On the whole, his office appears to have been primarily a military one, and he acted more as a representative of the royal power than as the prince of an old and well-defined country. He initially bore the Latin title princeps Capue, but after acquiring Naples he used the longer title princeps Capuanorum et dux Neapolitanorum, "Prince of the Capuans and Duke of the Neapolitans". At Capua he minted copper follari in the style of the old princes but much smaller in size. Six types are known, some bearing the inscription AN (for Anfusus) or A P (for Anfusus princeps) and some even with Pseudo-Kufic inscriptions. He had his own court and his own officials, who dated charters by the years of his reign. Perhaps because of the independent-mindedness of the Capuan barons, Alfonso's government in Capua was more formally organised than that of his brother Roger in Apulia. Sometime after 1135, probably towards 1140, Duke Richard III of Gaeta was compelled to swear homage to King Roger, Duke Roger and Prince Alfonso.

== Wars in the north ==
In March 1140, acting on his father's orders, Alfonso commenced the conquest of the Abruzzo, which belonged to the Duchy of Spoleto, part of the kingdom of Italy. Shortly after he was joined by his brother Roger. They took the strategic fortresses of Arce and Sora, and extended the kingdom over all the territory from the river Pescara to the Tronto. The chronicler Falco of Benevento records that they took many castles and settlements, burned others and left with great spoils. The king then joined his sons and, on 28 April 1140, Alfonso witnessed the king's charter by which he founded the Cappella Palatina in Palermo. By July 1140 the frontier of the kingdom had been pushed north as far as Ceprano in the papal state. According to the Chronica Ferrariensis, when Pope Innocent wrote to Alfonso demanding that he cease invading his lands, he wrote back that "he would not seek another's lands, but wanted only to reintegrate lands belonging to his Capuan principality, and so subjugate all the lands of the principality of Capua and the duchy of Apulia to himself." (Note: In Latin, aliena se nolle appetere sed solummodo terras principatui Capuano suo pertinentes velle reintegrare, et sic omnes terras principatus capuani et ducatus Apulie sibi subiugare.)

In July 1142, the king and Alfonso held a great court at Silva Marca near Ariano, attended by all the counts of the mainland. Alfonso then invaded the papal territory of Marsia, which Alfonso claimed belonged to the princes of Capua, although they had no exercised power there since the reign of Prince Richard I in the 1070s. Alfonso also intervened in a dispute within the family of the counts of Teramo. He removed Count Matthew and replaced him with his brothers, William and Robert. In November 1143 the conquest of Marsia was completed and its feudal lords accepted the authority of the King of Sicily. All the conquered territories in the Abruzzo and Latium were then divided by the between Apulia and Capua, Alfonso taking the lands to the west of the Gran Sasso d'Italia.

At Ceprano in early June 1144, King Roger and Alfonso opened negotiations with Pope Lucius II, who demanded the restoration of the Principality of Capua as a full papal fief. After fifteen days, the negotiations were broken off. The king left to prepare a naval expedition, while Alfonso invaded the papal state, taking the towns of Rieti and Amiterno. Lucius quickly agreed to a seven-year truce with Alfonso, but Roger refused to ratify it. The prince of Capua died on 10 October 1144, probably in the course of this campaign. Roger signed a treaty with Lucius shortly after, relinquishing Alfonso's most recent conquests. Alfonso was succeeded at Capua and Naples by his younger brother William, and the government of Capua was again entrusted to Robert of Selby.

An elegy for an unnamed "son of Roger the Frank, lord of Sicily" by the Sicilian poet Abū l-Ḍawʾ was about either Alfonso or his older brother Tancred.

== Sources ==
- Arthur, Paul (2002). Naples, from Roman Town to City-state: An Archaeological Perspective. London: British School at Rome.
- Chalandon, Ferdinand (1907). Histoire de la domination normande en Italie et en Sicile. Vol. 2. Paris: Alphonse Picard.
- Fasoli, Gina (1960). "Altavilla, Alfonso d'". Dizionario Biografico degli Italiani. Vol. 2. Rome: Istituto dell'Enciclopedia Italiana.
- Grierson, Philip; Blackburn, Mark A. S.; Travaini, Lucia (2009). Medieval European Coinage. Vol. 14: Italy (III) (South Italy, Sicily, Sardinia). Cambridge: Cambridge University Press.
- Houben, Hubert (2002). Roger II of Sicily: A Ruler Between East and West. Cambridge: Cambridge University Press.
- Jamison, Evelyn (1913). "The Norman Administration of Apulia and Capua, more especially under Roger II and William I, 1127–66". Papers of the British School at Rome. 6: 211–481. doi:10.1017/s006824620000132x. S2CID 161057290.
- Johns, Jeremy (2002). Arabic Administration in Norman Sicily: The Royal Dīwān. Cambridge University Press.
- Matthew, Donald (1992). The Norman Kingdom of Sicily. Cambridge: Cambridge University Press.
- Skinner, Patricia (1995). "Politics and Piracy: The Duchy of Gaeta in the Twelfth Century". Journal of Medieval History. 21 (4): 307–19. doi:10.1016/0304-4181(95)00773-3.
- Takayama, Hiroshi (1993). The Administration of the Norman Kingdom of Sicily. Leiden: E. J. Brill.

Regnal titles
Vacant Title last held by Sergius VII	Duke of Naples; 1139–1144	Succeeded by William I
Preceded by Robert II as undisputed prince	— DISPUTED — Prince of Capua; 1135–1144; Disputed by Robert II	Succeeded by William I
