= Robert II of Capua =

Southern Italy in 1112 CE showing the major states and cities. Smaller states and city-states, usually under the suzerainty or vassalage of the larger states, are not shown.

Robert II (died 1156) was the count of Aversa and the prince of Capua from 1127 until his death.

He was the only son and successor of Jordan II of Capua. According to the Lombard chronicler Falco of Benevento, he was "of delicate constitution, he could endure neither labour nor hardship."

== Early reign and coronation ==
In the final month of 1127, Pope Honorius II came to Benevento to preach a crusade against Count Roger II of Sicily in order to prevent the union of his county with the duchy of Apulia (Duke William II being recently deceased). At the start of 1128, Honorius II granted investiture to Robert which made the principalities of Capua independent from Apulia. The pope endeavoured to gain Robert's loyalty to help defeat Roger II of Sicily in return for remissions of his sins. He was quickly recruited for the endeavour by the pope, who went to Capua for the ceremony. The pope probably hoped to use Capua as a counterpoise against Apulia, as in the days of Robert's grandfather and great-grandfather. Likewise, Robert may have intended to be the chief papal protector, as his ancestors had been. However, he was weak-willed and he soon fell ill and wanted out. Eventually, the coalition commenced negotiations on Roger's arrival with an army. Honorius even successfully negotiated the independence of Capua. In 1129, however, Robert submissively surrendered suzerainty to the duke of Apulia and, the next year (on 25 December 1130) it was believed by Falco of Benevento that, as Roger's vassal-in-chief, laid the crown on his head at his royal coronation. This is difficult to believe as it was such a crucial role and Roger II would not have wanted Robert, as one of his vassals, to perform such an important task, even if he was one of the highest rank.

== Rebellion against Roger II of Sicily ==
In 1132, Robert rebelled with many other south Italian vassals of the king of Sicily and with the support of Pope Innocent II and his coalition of King Louis VI of France, King Henry I of England, and Emperor Lothair II. Robert defeated Roger at the Battle of Nocera on 24 July, but Roger burnt Aversa and, by 1134, forced Count Ranulf of Alife and the nominally Byzantine Duke Sergius VII of Naples to submit. Robert was given an ultimatum; if he wanted to keep his title, he must submit to Roger. After the death of Roger's wife, Elvira, and the false news of Roger's death, Robert went to Naples from Pisa with 8000 men. He was met by Rainulf and Duke Sergius when Roger arrived in June 1135, he again offered Robert a choice to keep his title. Roger made his third son Alfonso prince in his stead (1135).

Robert fled to Pisa, where he gathered a navy and made war against Roger in Sicily, but it was a stalemate. The Pisan fleet ravaged Amalfi and took much loot. Laden with this plunder and accompanied by a papal legation, Robert went to Germany to plead for the aid of the emperor. In Spring 1137, the emperor came down with Pope Innocent II; Henry the Proud, duke of Bavaria; and a large force. They took Benevento, Bari, and Capua itself, installing Ranulf as duke of Apulia and Robert in Capua, vindicating these actions in battle. But when the emperor left Italy, Roger sacked Capua yet again. On 25 July 1139, Robert and the pope were defeated in battle on the Garigliano, at Galluccio, ambushed by Roger. The pope was captured, though Robert escaped. They thereafter acknowledged him as principatus Capuae.

== Exile, return, and capture ==
He spent most of the next fifteen years in exile in Germany. When Alfonso died in 1144, Roger made his fourth son William prince. However, following Roger's death in 1154, there was a revolt on the mainland, led by Robert II of Basunvilla, cousin of the new king William I.

When William was excommunicated by Pope Adrian IV, and with (unjustified) rumours that the Emperor Frederick I Barbarossa was set to invade southern Italy, Prince Robert was tempted to make a comeback. He swore homage to Adrian retook Capua (1155), taking advantage of William's serious illness. However, in the spring of 1156 William recovered and took a fleet to the mainland. He dealt, first, with the more serious threat from Robert of Basunvilla and the other Apulian and Campanian rebels, but then he turned to Capua. Robert was captured. He might have been executed as a traitor, but instead William sent him as a prisoner to Palermo, where he was possibly blinded: according to the Annales Casinenses, Robbertus de Surrento was blinded and died soon after.

== Family ==
Robert left a son named Jordan who lived in Constantinople, where he served the Emperor Manuel I Comnenus as sebastos and diplomat. He journeyed to Rome in 1166–1167 to try and aid the reunion of the Roman Catholic and Eastern Orthodox churches.

== Notes ==
Preceded by Jordan II	Count of Aversa; 1127–1156	Succeeded by William
Preceded by Jordan II	Prince of Capua; 1127–1156	Succeeded by William
