= Roger II of Sicily =

King of Sicily from 1130 to 1154

Roger II
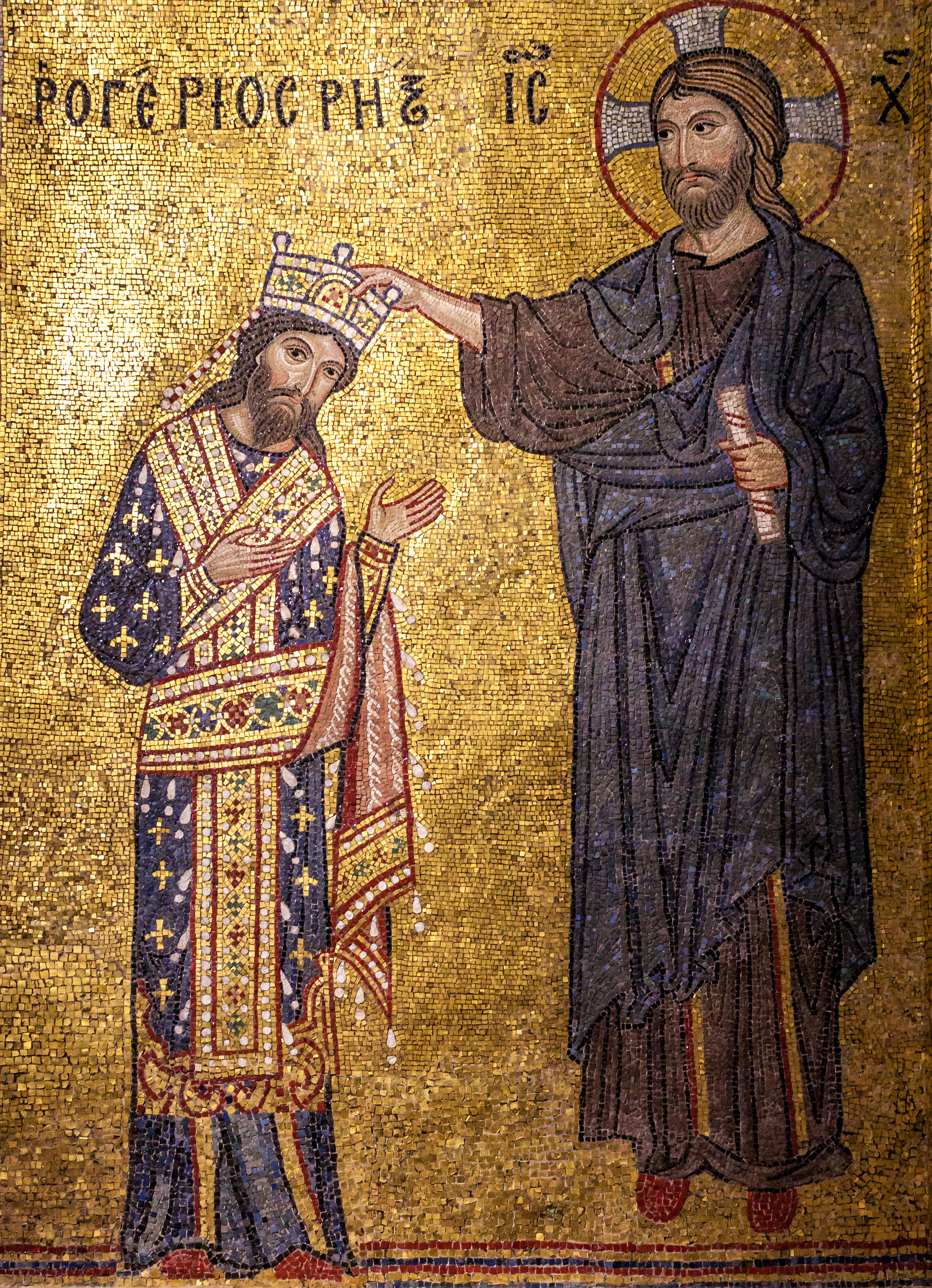
- Detail of a mosaic showing Roger II (Rogerios Rex in Greek letters) receiving the crown from Jesus Christ (IC), Martorana, Palermo.

Count of Sicily
- Reign: 1105 - 27 September 1130
- Predecessor: Simon

King of Sicily
- Reign: 27 September 1130 - 26 February 1154
- Coronation: 25 December 1130
- Successor: William I
- Born: 22 December 1095; Mileto (Calabria)
- Died: 26 February 1154 (aged 58); Palermo, Kingdom of Sicily
- Burial: Cathedral of Palermo, Sicily
- Spouse: Elvira of Castile; Sibylla of Burgundy; Beatrice of Rethel
- Issue Among others: Roger III, Duke of Apulia; Tancred, Prince of Bari; William I, King of Sicily; Alfonso, Prince of Capua; Constance I, Queen of Sicily; Simon, Prince of Taranto (ill.)
- House: Hauteville
- Father: Roger I of Sicily
- Mother: Adelaide del Vasto

Roger II or Roger the Great (Italian: Ruggero II, Sicilian: Ruggeru II, Greek: Ρογέριος; 22 December 1095 - 26 February 1154) was King of Sicily and Africa, son of Roger I of Sicily and successor to his brother Simon. He began his rule as Count of Sicily in 1105, became Duke of Apulia and Calabria in 1127, then King of Sicily in 1130 and King of Africa in 1148.

== Background ==
By 999, Norman adventurers had arrived in southern Italy. By 1016, they were involved in the complex local politics, where Lombards were fighting against the Byzantine Empire. As mercenaries they fought the enemies of the Italian city-states, sometimes fighting for the Byzantines and sometimes against them, but in the following century they gradually became the rulers of the major polities south of Rome.

Roger I ruled the County of Sicily at the time of the birth of his youngest son, Roger, at Mileto, Calabria, in 1095. Roger I's nephew, Roger Borsa, was the duke of Apulia and Calabria, and his great nephew, Richard II of Capua, was the prince of Capua. Alongside these three major rulers were a large number of minor counts, who effectively exercised sovereign power in their own localities. These counts at least nominally owed allegiance to one of these three Norman rulers, but such allegiance was usually weak and often ignored.

When Roger I died in 1101, his young son Simon became count, with his mother Adelaide del Vasto as regent. Simon died four years later in 1105 at the age of 12. Adelaide continued as regent to her younger son Roger, who was nine.

== Reign ==
=== Rise to power in Sicily ===
Southern Italy in 1112. The border of the Kingdom of Sicily at the time of Roger's death in 1154 is indicated by a thicker black line encircling most of southern Italy.

Upon the death in 1105 of his elder brother, Simon of Hauteville, Roger inherited the County of Sicily under the regency of his mother, Adelaide del Vasto, and his brother-in-law, Robert of Burgundy (d. 1112), son of Robert the Old. His mother was assisted by such notables as Christodulus, the Greek emir of Palermo. In 1109, Byzantine Emperor Alexios I Komnenos bestowed upon him the title of protonobilissimos in recognition of his knowledge of the Byzantine court. In the summer of 1110, Roger was visited by the Norwegian king Sigurd the Crusader, who was on his way to Jerusalem. (Note: Houben quoting Snorri Sturluson, Heimskringla, written in the 1220s. According to the Fagrskinna, Roger was Jarl Rogeirr.) The story in Icelandic sources suggests that Sigurd called Roger the king of Sicily twenty years before the latter actually obtained this title.

In 1112, at the age of sixteen, Roger began his personal rule, being named "now knight, now count of Sicily and Calabria" in a charter document dated 12 June 1112. In 1117, his mother, who had married Baldwin I of Jerusalem, returned to Sicily, since the patriarch of Jerusalem had declared the marriage invalid. Roger seems to have felt the slight, and this might explain his later reluctance to go crusading. (Note: Houben quoting William of Tyre, Chronicon xi.29) Roger married his first wife, Elvira, daughter of King Alfonso VI of Castile and his fourth wife Isabella, who may be identical to his former concubine, a Muslim princess of the Abbadid dynasty named Zaida, who was baptized with the name of Isabella.

In 1122, Duke William II of Apulia, who was fighting with Count Jordan of Ariano, offered to renounce his remaining claims to Sicily as well as part of Calabria. Roger, in exchange, provided William with 600 knights and access to money for his campaign.

=== Rise to power in southern Italy ===
When William II of Apulia died childless in July 1127, Roger claimed all Hauteville family possessions in the peninsula as well as the overlordship of the Principality of Capua, which had been nominally given to Apulia almost thirty years earlier. However, the union of Sicily and Apulia was resisted by Pope Honorius II and by the subjects of the duchy itself.

==== Royal investiture ====
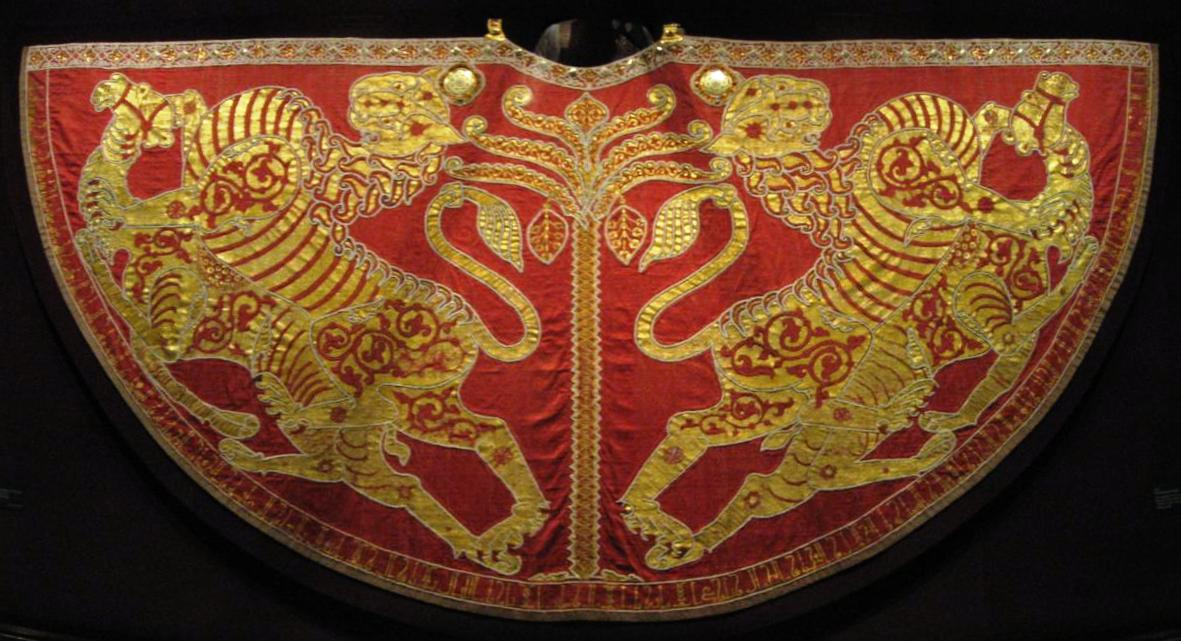
Royal mantle of Roger II, bearing an inscription in Arabic with the Hijrah date of 528 (1133-34). Imperial Treasury, Vienna, in the Hofburg Palace.

The popes had long been suspicious of the growth of Norman power in southern Italy, and at Capua in December, the pope preached a crusade against Roger, setting Robert II of Capua and Ranulf II of Alife (his own brother-in-law) against him. After this coalition failed, in August 1128 Honorius invested Roger at Benevento as Duke of Apulia. The baronial resistance, backed by Naples, Bari, Salerno, and other cities whose aim was civic freedom, gave way. In September 1129 Roger was generally recognized as duke of Apulia by Sergius VII of Naples, Robert of Capua, and the rest. He began at once to enforce order in the duchy, where ducal power had long been fading.

On the death of Pope Honorius in February 1130 there were two claimants to the papal throne. Roger supported Antipope Anacletus II against Innocent II. The reward was a crown, and, on 27 September 1130, Anacletus' papal bull made Roger king of Sicily. He was crowned in Palermo on Christmas Day 1130.

==== The Royal Mantle of Roger II ====
Roger II's elaborate royal mantle bears the year 528 of the Islamic calendar (1133–34); therefore it could not have been used for his coronation. This lavish item, made for special events to show power and regality, was most likely worn as a symbol of the Norman's victory and new dynasty in Sicily. It was later used as a coronation cloak by the Holy Roman Emperors and is now in the Imperial Treasury (Schatzkammer) in Vienna.

The mantle is an example of the Normans' multicultural court and a mark of trade in Palermo. It is a luxury object made from red silk imported from the Byzantine Empire, its outer panels embellished with gold embroidery, pearls, enamel and jewels. The lining panels are separated into five sections made from three separate silks, each woven with gold. The pearls are from the Persian Gulf, with thousands outlining each section of the embroidery. Pearls were a common decoration on pan-Mediterranean textiles, but were also used and admired on clothing of the Byzantine Empire. The enameled surfaces are also attributed to the Byzantine Empire, as they had many craftsmen specializing in this type of work. The gold embroidery was most likely created by Muslim craftsmen, given the tiraz bands, the Arabic text in calligraphy, and Kufic script. The piece was made in a private royal workshop, dedicated to creating tiraz fabric and other royal garments. It is one of few surviving mementos of Fatimid-style royal garb preserved in its entirety.

The inscription written in the tiraz band along the bottom of the piece states, "Here is what was created in the princely treasury, filled with luck, eminence, majesty, perfection, long-suffering, superiority, welcome, prosperity, liberality, brilliance, pride, beauty, the fulfillment of desires and hopes, the pleasure of days and nights, without cease or change, of glory, devotion, preservation of protection, luck, salvation, victory and capability, in the capital of Sicily, in the year 528 H. [1133-1134]" This mantle was made to promote status, bring the wearer good fortune, and to emphasize Roger II's regal power.

In addition to its lavish decoration and color, the mantle uses striking imagery to convey Roger II's power and victory over the previous dynasty. In a scene evoking domination through primal violence, two lions, a heraldic symbol of a powerful, male ruler, each attack a camel, addorsed on either side of a central palm tree. The lions are stylized rather than realistically portrayed. There are also evocations of the cosmos and constellations in the star shapes on the lions' heads. The mantle's pan-Mediterranean influence is brought out in the materials used to create it, the way it was made, and its design.

==== Peninsular rebellions ====
Roger's backing of Anacletus plunged him into a ten-year war. Bernard of Clairvaux, Innocent's champion, organized a coalition against Anacletus and his "half-heathen king". He was joined by Louis VI of France, Henry I of England, and Lothair III, Holy Roman Emperor. Meanwhile, southern Italy revolted. From 1127 to 1139, Roger faced a peninsular aristocracy that was often reluctant to accept the consolidation of the new kingdom and the king's authority.

In 1130, the Duchy of Amalfi revolted and in 1131, Roger sent John of Palermo across the Strait of Messina to join up with a royal troop from Apulia and Calabria and march on Amalfi by land while George of Antioch blockaded the town by sea and set up a base on Capri. Amalfi soon capitulated.

In 1132, Roger sent Robert II of Capua and Ranulf II of Alife to Rome in a show of force in support of Anacletus. While they were away, Roger's half-sister Matilda, Ranulf's wife, fled to Roger claiming abuse. Simultaneously, Roger annexed Ranulf's brother's County of Avellino. Ranulf demanded the restitution of both wife and countship. Both were denied, and Ranulf left Rome against orders, with Robert following.

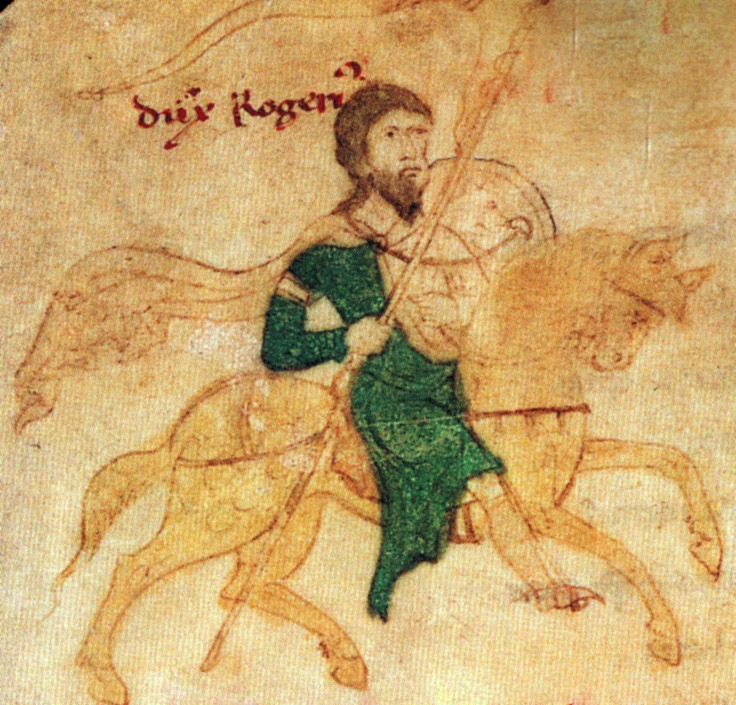
Roger II riding to war, from the Liber ad honorem Augusti of Petrus de Ebulo, 1196.

First Roger dealt with a rebellion in Apulia, where he defeated and deposed Grimoald, Prince of Bari, replacing him with his second son Tancred. Meanwhile, Robert and Ranulf took papal Benevento. Roger went to meet them but was defeated at the Battle of Nocera on 25 July 1132. He retreated to Salerno.

The next year, Lothair III came down to Rome for his imperial coronation. The rebel leaders met him there, but they were refused help because Lothair's force was too small. With the emperor's departure, divisions in his opponents' ranks allowed Roger to reverse his fortunes. By July 1134, his troops had forced Ranulf, Sergius, and the other ringleaders to submit. Robert was expelled from Capua and Roger installed his third son, Alfonso of Hauteville, as Prince of Capua. Roger II's eldest son Roger was given the title of Duke of Apulia.

Meanwhile, Lothair's contemplated attack upon Roger had gained the backing of the Republic of Pisa, the Republic of Genoa, and the Byzantine emperor John II, each of whom feared the growth of a powerful Norman kingdom. A Pisan fleet led by the exiled prince of Capua dropped anchor off Naples in 1135. Ranulf joined Robert and Sergius there, encouraged by news coming from Sicily that Roger was fatally ill or even already dead. The important fortress of Aversa, among others, passed to the rebels and only Capua resisted, under the royal chancellor, Guarin. On 5 June, however, Roger disembarked in Salerno, much to the surprise of all the mainland provinces. The royal army, split into several forces, easily conquered Aversa and even Alife, the base of the natural rebel leader, Ranulf. Most of the rebels took refuge in Naples, which was besieged in July, but despite poor health conditions within the city, Roger was unable to take it, and returned to Messina late in the year.

==== Imperial invasion ====
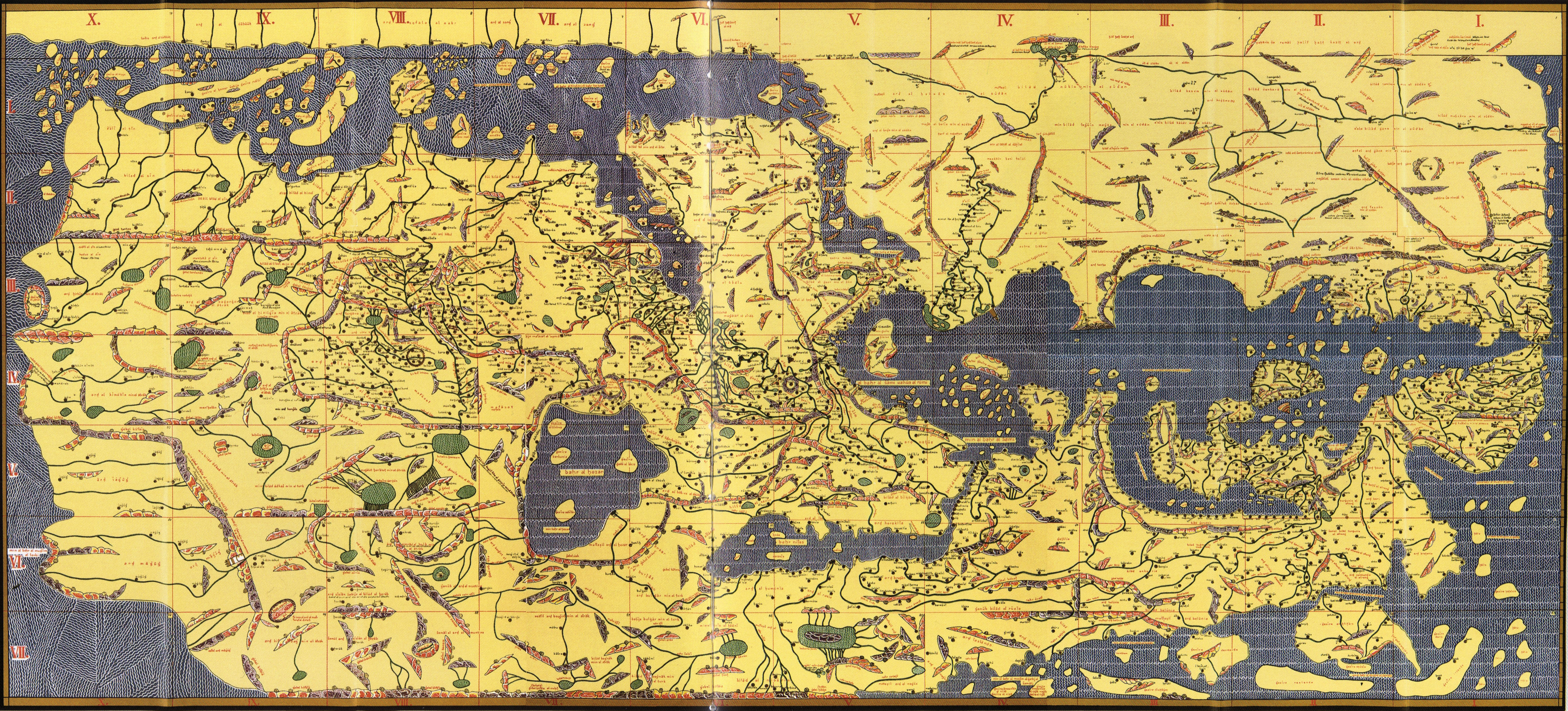
The Tabula Rogeriana, an ancient world map drawn by Muhammad al-Idrisi for Roger II of Sicily in 1154. North is at the bottom, the reverse of modern cartographic conventions.

In 1136, the long-awaited imperial army, led by Lothair and the Duke of Bavaria, Henry the Proud, descended the peninsula to support the three rebels. Henry, Robert, and Ranulf took a large contingent of troops to besiege the peninsular capital of the kingdom, Salerno. Roger remained in Sicily, leaving its mainland garrisons helpless under the chancellor Robert of Selby, while even the Byzantine emperor John II Comnenus sent subsidies to Lothair. Salerno surrendered, and the large army of Germans and Normans marched to the very south of Apulia. There, in June 1137, Lothair besieged and took Bari. At San Severino, after the victorious campaign, he and the pope jointly invested Ranulf as Duke of Apulia in August 1137, and the emperor then retired to Germany. Roger, freed from the utmost danger, immediately disembarked in Calabria, at Tropea, with 400 knights and other troops, probably mostly Muslims. After having been welcomed by the Salernitans, he recovered ground in Campania, sacking Pozzuoli, Alife, Capua, and Avellino. Sergius was forced to acknowledge him as overlord of Naples and switch his allegiance to Anacletus. This moment marked the fall of an independent Neapolitan duchy, and thereafter the ancient city was fully integrated into the Norman realm.

From there Roger moved to Benevento and northern Apulia, where Duke Ranulf, although steadily losing his bases of power, had some German troops plus some 1,500 knights from the cities of Melfi, Trani, Troia, and Bari, who were "ready to die rather than lead a miserable life". On 30 October 1137, at the Battle of Rignano (next to Monte Gargano), the younger Roger and his father, with Sergius of Naples, met the defensive army of Duke Ranulf. It was the greatest defeat of Roger II's career. Sergius died and Roger fled to Salerno. It capped Ranulf's meteoric career: twice victor over Roger. Anacletus II died in January 1138, but Innocent II refused to reconcile with the king.

In spring 1138, the royal army invaded the Principality of Capua, with the precise intent of avoiding a pitched battle and of dispersing Ranulf's army with a series of marches through difficult terrain. While the Count of Alife hesitated, Roger, now supported by Benevento, destroyed all the rebels' castles in the region, capturing an immense booty. In April 1139, Innocent II declared Roger excommunicated. Ranulf himself, who had taken refuge in his capital Troia, died of malarial fever on 30 April 1139. Roger exhumed his body from his grave in Troia cathedral and threw it in a ditch, only to repent subsequently and rebury him decently.

At this time, with Sergius dead, Alfonso was elected to replace him and together with his brother Roger went off to conquer the Abruzzi.

==== Consolidation of kingship ====
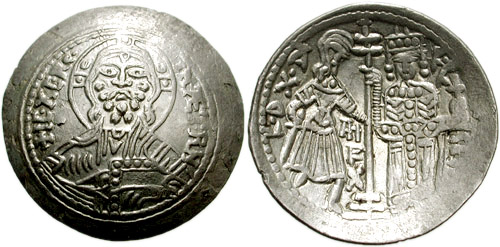
AR Scyphate Ducalis, dated year 10 (1140), after the king's victory on 25 July. Obverse: Christ. Reverse: King Roger and Duke Roger.

After the death of Anacletus in January 1138, Roger had sought the confirmation of his title from Innocent. However, the pope wanted an independent Principality of Capua as a buffer state between the Kingdom of Sicily and the Papal States, something Roger would not accept. In the summer of 1139, Innocent II invaded the kingdom with a large army, but was ambushed on 22 July 1139 at Galluccio, southeast of present-day Cassino, by Roger's son and was captured. Three days later, by the Treaty of Mignano, the pope proclaimed Roger II rex Siciliae ducatus Apuliae et principatus Capuae (King of Sicily, Duke of Apulia and Prince of Capua). The boundaries of his regno were only later fixed by a truce with the pope in October 1144. These lands were for the next seven centuries to constitute the kingdoms of Naples and Sicily. With the mainland opposition broken, Roger reorganized confiscated lordships and comital titles in the peninsular provinces. By the 1140s, the mainland had been effectively restructured around Terra di Lavoro, Apulia, and Calabria, while some counties were suppressed, resized, or reassigned to loyal barons.

In 1139, Bari, the 50,000 inhabitants of which had remained unscathed behind its massive walls during the wars of the past year, decided to surrender. The excellentissimus princeps Jaquintus, who had led the rebellion of the city, was hanged, along with many of his followers, but the city avoided being sacked. Roger's execution of the prince and his counsellors was perhaps the most violent act of his life.

While his sons overcame pockets of resistance on the mainland, on 5 November 1139 Roger returned to Palermo to plan a great act of legislation: the Assizes of Ariano, an attempt to establish his dominions in southern Italy as a coherent state. He returned to check on his sons' progress in 1140 and then went to Ariano, a town central to the peninsular possessions (and a center of rebellion under his predecessors). There he promulgated the great law regulating all Sicilian affairs. It invested the king and his bureaucracy with absolute powers and reduced the authority of the often rebellious vassals. While there, centralising his kingdom, Roger declared a new standard coinage, named after the duchy of Apulia: the ducat.

=== Economy ===
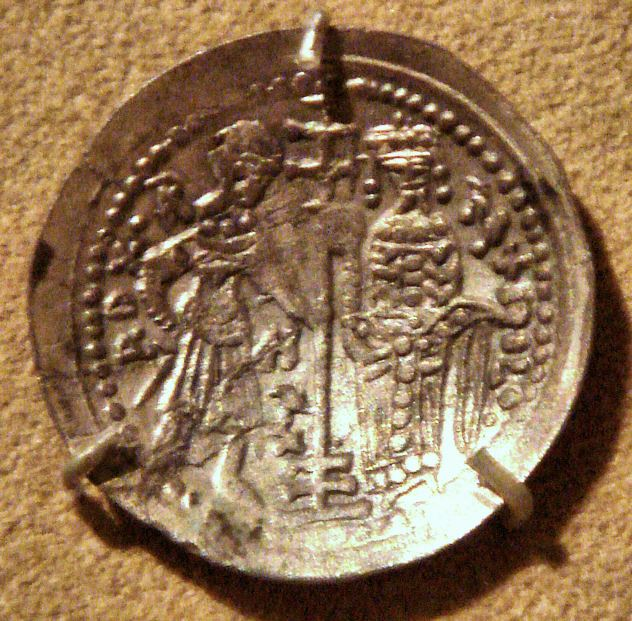
Coin of Roger II of Sicily, silver Ducale, Brindisi mint.

Roger's reforms in laws and administration aimed not only to strengthen his rule but also to improve the economic standing of Sicily and southern Italy. He was "very concerned to gain money, but hardly very prodigal in expending it".

In 1140 at his assembly at Ariano he introduced new coinage including smaller denominations, to facilitate trade with the rest of the Mediterranean. However, although this new coinage made long-distance trade easier, it was detrimental to local trade, which spread "hatred throughout Italy". By the 1150s most of this coinage was no longer in use and soon after, it disappeared altogether.

Nevertheless, the controversy over the coinage did not hinder the Kingdom's prosperity. Roger II had acquired large wealth not only through his royal patrimony but also through his military campaigns and their financial rewards. For example, gold and silver were gained through the campaigns in Apulia in 1133 and Greece in 1147.

Sicily's geographic situation at the centre of the Mediterranean favored trade with Europe, North Africa and the Middle East. Its primary export was durum wheat; others included foods like cheese and vine fruits. Unlike other states, Sicily also had a strong political and military standing, so its merchants were supported and to some extent protected. This standing allowed for an increase in internal trade and a stronger market, which led to noticeable developments in agriculture.

=== Later reign ===
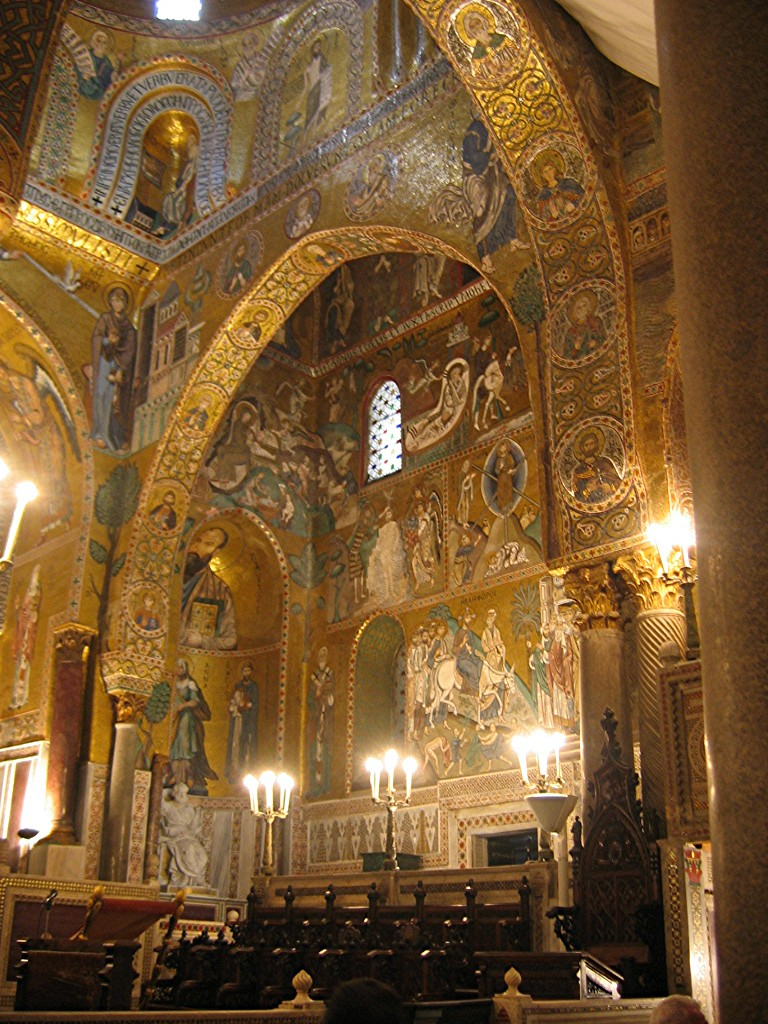
"The Cappella Palatina, at Palermo, the most wonderful of Roger's churches, with Norman doors, Saracenic arches, Byzantine dome, and roof adorned with Arabic scripts, is perhaps the most striking product of the brilliant and mixed civilization over which the grandson of the Norman Tancred ruled." (From the 1911 Encyclopædia Britannica).

Roger had now become one of the greatest kings in Europe. At Palermo, he gathered round him distinguished men from a variety of ethnicities and cultures, such as the famous Arab geographer Muhammad al-Idrisi and the Byzantine Greek historian Nilus Doxopatrius or Neilos Doxapatres. Sicily, in the center of the Mediterranean and a natural stopping point for people traveling across it, had been run by several different groups in its history, and Roger welcomed the learned and practiced tolerance toward the several religions, ethnicities and languages of his realm. To administer his domain he hired many Greeks and Arabs, who were trained in long-established traditions of centralized government. He was served by men of several nationalities, such as the Englishman Thomas Brun, a kaid of the Curia, and in the fleet by two Greeks, first Christodulus and then George of Antioch, whom he made in 1132 ammiratus ammiratorum or "Emir of Emirs", in effect prime vizier. (This title later became the English word admiral). On the mainland, royal government also relied on local military commanders, including royal constables (comestabuli), who helped coordinate provincial forces and lesser barons during the kingdom's formative decades. Roger made Sicily the leading maritime power in the Mediterranean.

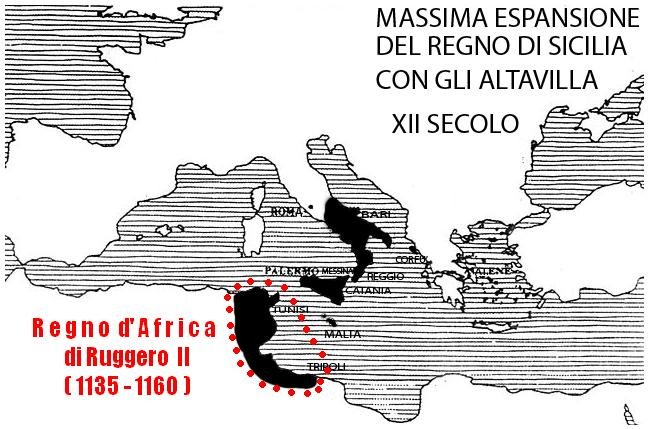
Roger II's "Kingdom of Africa" (Regno d'Africa) pinpointed in red

A powerful fleet was built up under several admirals, or "emirs", of whom the greatest was George, formerly in the service of the Muslim prince of Mahdia. Mainly thanks to him, a series of conquests were made on the African coast (1146-1153). From 1135 Roger II started to conquer the coast of Tunisia and enlarge his dominions: Tripoli was captured in 1146 and Cape Bona in 1148. These conquests were lost in the reign of Roger's successor William, however, and never formed an integral part of the kingdom in southern Italy.

The Second Crusade (1147-1148) offered Roger an opportunity to revive attacks on the Byzantine Empire, the traditional Norman enemy to the East. It also afforded him an opportunity, through the agency of Theodwin, a cardinal ever-vigilant for Crusade supporters, to strike up a correspondence with Conrad III of Germany in an effort to break his alliance with Manuel I Comnenus. Roger himself never went on an expedition against Byzantium, instead handing command to the skillful George. In 1147, George set sail from Otranto with seventy galleys to attack Corfu. According to Nicetas Choniates, the island capitulated thanks to George's bribes (and the tax burden of the imperial government), welcoming the Normans as their liberators. Leaving a garrison of 1,000 men, George sailed on to the Peloponnesus. He sacked Athens and quickly moved on to the Aegean Islands. He ravaged the coast all along Euboea and the Gulf of Corinth and penetrated as far as Thebes, where he pillaged the silk factories and carried off the damask, brocade, and silk weavers, taking them back to Palermo where they formed the basis for the Sicilian silk industry. George capped the expedition with a sack of Corinth, in which the relics of Saint Theodore were stolen, and then returned to Sicily. In 1149, however, Corfu was retaken. George went on a punitive expedition against Constantinople, but could not land and instead defied the Byzantine emperor by firing arrows against the palace windows. Despite this act, his expedition left no enduring effects.

Roger died at Palermo on 26 February 1154 and was buried in the Cathedral of Palermo. He was succeeded by his fourth son, William.

== Modern legacy ==
Roger is the subject of King Roger, a 1926 opera by Polish composer Karol Szymanowski. The last months of his life are also featured in Tariq Ali's book A Sultan in Palermo. Studiorum Universitas Ruggero II, a private non-traditional university connected to Accademia Normanna was incorporated in the U.S. on 30 April 2001 in his honor.

== Family ==
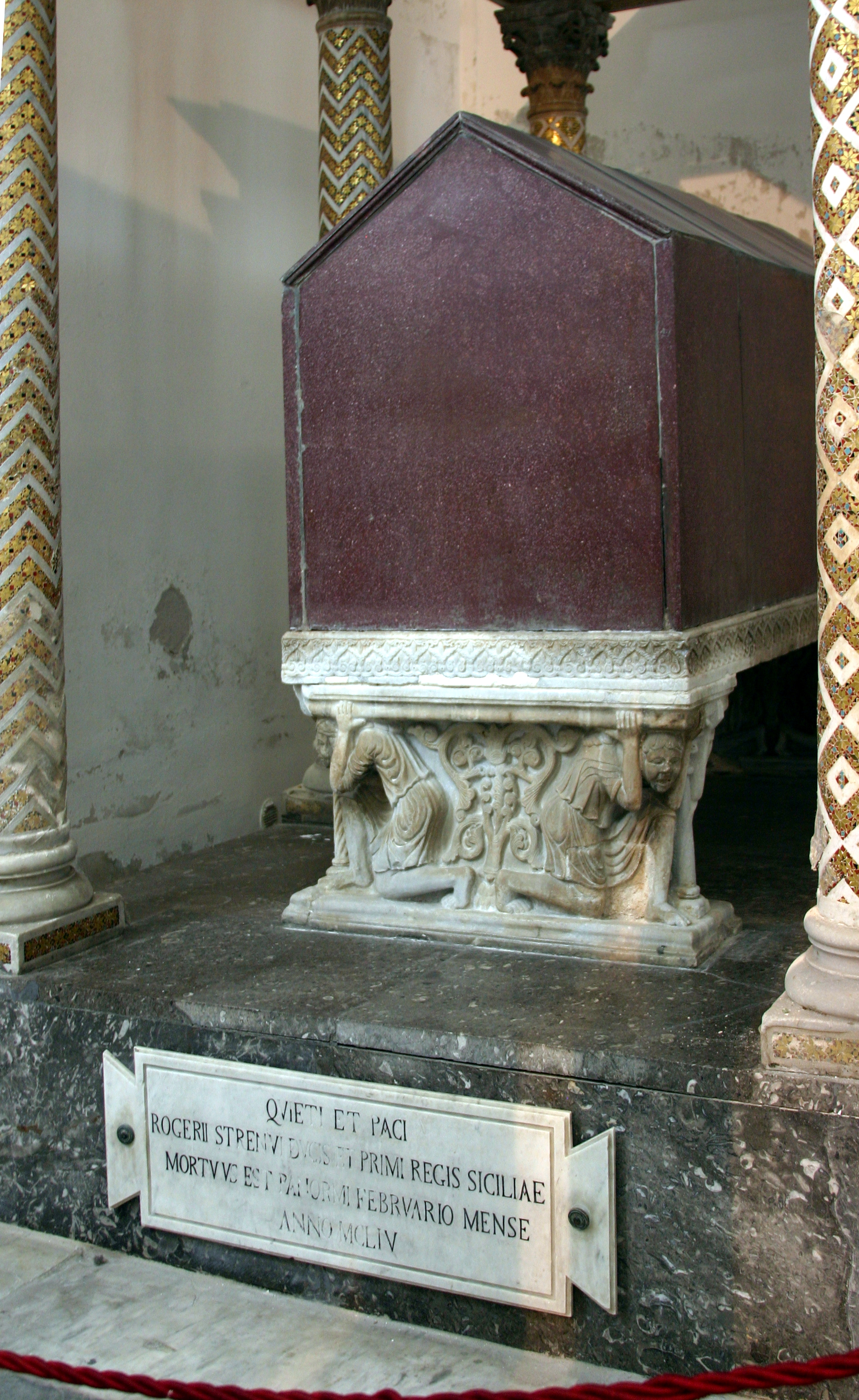
Roger's tomb in the Cathedral of Palermo

Roger's first marriage was in 1117 to Elvira, a daughter of King Alfonso VI of Castile. When she died, rumors flew that Roger had died as well, as his grief had made him a recluse. They had six children:

- Roger III (1118 - 12 May 1148), heir, Duke of Apulia (from 1135), possibly also Count of Lecce.
- Tancred (1120-1138), Prince of Bari (from 1135).
- William I (1120/1121 - 7 May 1166), his successor, Duke of Apulia (from 1148).
- Alfonso (1122 - 10 October 1144), Prince of Capua (from 1135) and Duke of Naples.
- Adelisia (1126 - post 1184), who married firstly Jocelyn, Count of Loreto, and secondly Robert III, Count of Loritello.
- Henry (1130 - 1143), prince of Taranto.

Roger's second marriage was in 1149 to Sibylla, daughter of Hugh II, Duke of Burgundy. They had two children:

- Henry (29 August 1149 - died young)
- Stillborn child (16 September 1150)

Roger's third marriage was in 1151 to Beatrice of Rethel, a grandniece of King Baldwin II of Jerusalem. They had one daughter:

- Constance (born posthumously, 2 November 1154 - 28 November 1198), who married Emperor Henry VI and was later Queen of Sicily

Roger also had five known illegitimate children:

- By a daughter of Hugues I, Count of Molise:

- Simon, who became Prince of Taranto in 1144

- With unknown mistresses:

- A daughter, wife of Rodrigo Garcés (later Henry, Count of Montescaglioso)
- A daughter, wife of the Neapolitan nobleman Adam
- Clemenza, married Hugues II, Count of Molise
- Marina or Martina, married the admiral Margaritus of Brindisi

== See also ==
- Palazzo dei Normanni (palace)

== Notes ==
Regnal titles
Preceded by Simon	Count of Sicily; 1105-1130	Kingdom of Sicily created
Preceded by William II	Duke of Apulia and Calabria; 1127-1134	Succeeded by Roger III
Preceded by Bohemond II	Prince of Taranto; 1128-1132	Succeeded by Tancred
New title	King of Sicily; 1130-1154	Succeeded by William I
