= County of Monte Sant'Angelo =

The County of Monte Sant'Angelo or Gargano was a large Norman county in southern Italy, covering the Gargano Peninsula and much of the later Province of Foggia. Its comital seat was Monte Sant'Angelo.

The ruling family was a cadet branch of the Drengots. The first count, Robert, inherited the Monte Sant'Angelo from his uncle Ranulf Drengot, to whom it had been granted as his share (a twelfth) of the Apulian conquests in 1042. Ranulf died in 1045. Robert founded the importance of his fief by marrying Gaitelgrima, daughter of Guaimar IV of Salerno and Drogo of Hauteville, the two most powerful south Italian lords of the day. Robert was succeeded by his sons, Richard, Henry, and William, in succession.

Henry renounced the suzerainty of the Duke of Apulia, Roger Borsa, and began to chart an independent course, giving his allegiance to the Byzantine Empire and dating his charters by the reign of Alexius I Comnenus. His county was the most powerful Norman state after the Principality of Capua and the Duchy of Apulia and the last foothold the Greeks had in Italy when it was conquered by Borsa from William in 1104. It was never recreated.

== Sources ==
- Chalandon, Ferdinand. Histoire de la domination normande en Italie et en Sicile. Paris, 1907.
- Caravale, Mario (ed). Dizionario Biografico degli Italiani LXII Dugoni – Enza. Rome, 1993.
- Jahn, W. Unersuchungen zur normannischen Herrschaftsbildung in Süditalien (1040–1100). Phil. Diss. Munich, 1988.
