= Henry, Count of Monte Sant'Angelo =

Henry (died probably 21 December 1102) was the Count of Monte Sant'Angelo, with his seat at Foggia, from November 1081.

He was the second son of Robert, Count of Lucera, and Gaitelgrima, daughter of Guaimar IV of Salerno. The identity of his father is disputable. He was either the same person as a Robert who was Count of Devia between 1054 and 1081 or he was a son of Asclettin, Count of Aversa, and brother of Richard I of Capua. Henry's mother is known from one of his documents of 1098 which calls Guaimar IV avi mei.

Henry had an elder brother named Richard who served as count between 1072 and 1077 and was dead by March 1083. He also had a younger brother named William and a sister named Gaita who married Rao of Devia.

Henry was the perhaps the same Henry as rebelled between 1079 and 1080 against Robert Guiscard. He certainly participated in the revolt in Apulia in 1081, on the eve of the Guiscard's first Balkan campaign. This revolt was led by Geoffrey, Count of Conversano, and supported by Alexius I Comnenus but quashed by 1083. Nonetheless, Henry had, in during the insurrection, transferred his allegiance to the Byzantine Empire. Between March 1083 and June 1086, he dated his charters by the reign of Alexius I.

In June 1087, Henry appeared at the side of Roger Borsa, apparently having patched up his differences with the Hauteville Dukes of Apulia. He maintained a good rapport with Borsa. In 1088, he was present at the duke's making of a donation to SS Trinità di Venosa and he made his own in 1089. Henry was a prolific donor to Benedictine monasteries, endowing, besides Venosa, Montecassino, La Trinità della Cava, S. Sofia di Benevento, and S. Giovanni in Lamis.

For every year between 1089 and 1096, save 1091, all his documents use imperial dating. During this era, his territorial authority reached its maximum extent stretching from Lucera to Fiorentino, Vaccarizza, and Siponto, along the coast of the Gargano from Vieste to Rodi and Cagnano and from San Nicandro to the promontory, Rignano, and the Capitanate.

In 1098, he donated land outside the walls of Monte Sant'Angelo to his uncle, John, Abbot of Curte, son of Guaimar IV, for the construction of a hospice. This hospice was approved by Pope Paschal II in January 1100. In April 1101, the hospice came under Cassinese supervision.

Henry died not long after and was succeeded by his brother William. In October 1104, Roger Borsa besieged William and expelled him, abolishing the county. In 1086, Henry had married Adelicia (died before 1096), daughter of Roger I of Sicily, but she gave him no descendants.

== Sources ==
- Chalandon, Ferdinand. Histoire de la domination normande en Italie et en Sicile. Paris, 1907.
- Caravale, Mario (ed). Dizionario Biografico degli Italiani LXII Dugoni – Enza. Rome, 1993.
- Jahn, W. Unersuchungen zur normannischen Herrschaftsbildung in Süditalien (1040–1100). Phil. Diss. Munich, 1988.
