= Jordan II of Capua =

12th-century Italian nobleman

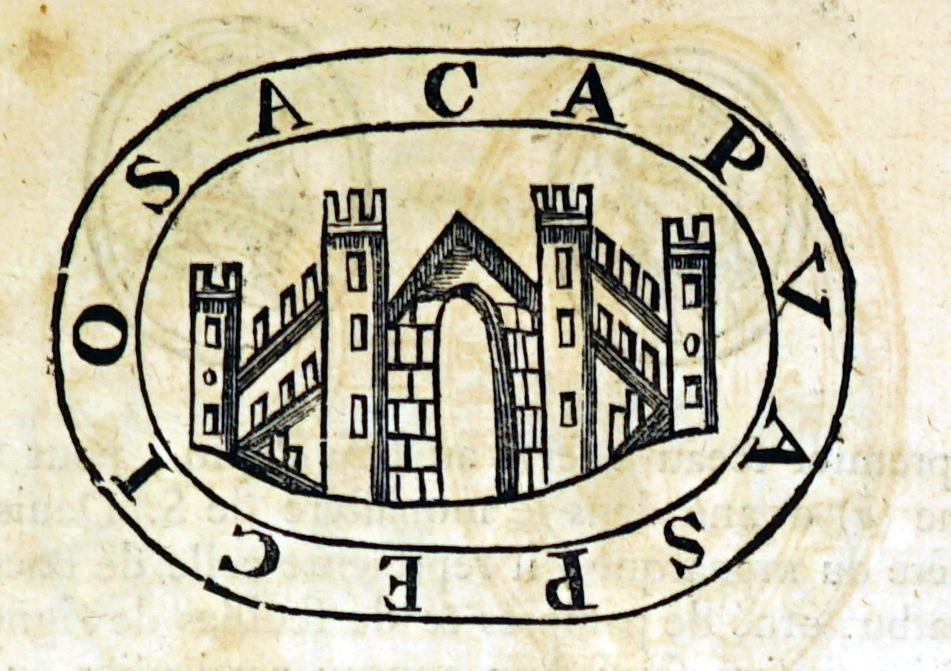
Seal of Jordan II from a document of 1125, depicting the city of Capua and the words CAPUA SPECIOSA ("Fair Capua").

Jordan II (Italian: Giordano) (born c. 1080 – died 19 December 1127) was the third son of Prince Jordan I of Capua and Princess Gaitelgrima, a daughter of Prince Guaimar IV of Salerno. He was, from at least May 1109, the lord of Nocera, and, after June 1120, Prince of Capua. The date and place of his birth are unknown, but it must have been later than 1080. He was married, before 1113, to Gaitelgrima, daughter of Sergius, Prince of Sorrento, a union which allowed him to extend his influence down the Amalfi coast from his castle at Nocera.

== Lord of Nocera ==
Map showing the Principality of Capua in 1112 (Capua represented by a star). Nocera is shown as the site of the later battle of Nocera and within the Duchy of Naples. In fact, the precise borders of these states are difficult to reconstruct. The Sorrentine peninsula juts out to the west of Salerno.

The earliest attestation of Jordan as lord of Nocera dates to May 1109, but it sheds no light on the nature of his lordship (dominatus). Before falling to the troops of Count Roger I of Sicily, Nocera had been the central town of one of the subdivisions, either an actus (circuit, jurisdiction) or comitatus (county), of the Principality of Salerno. There is some evidence that the old territorial divisions of the principality survived the Norman takeover. Nocera, guarding a narrow valley connecting the Principality of Salerno with the Principality of Capua, retained strategic significance so long as the Hauteville family controlled the former and Jordan's family, the Drengots, the latter. However, no surviving document explicitly attributes to Jordan command of the district around Nocera, nor, before becoming prince, did he employ a formal title. His charter always refer to him as "Jordan, son of the Jordan once prince" (Jordanus Jordani filius quondam principis).

In a deed of gift of 1113, Jordan states that property he was dispensing was "in the territory of Nocera, which belongs to me" (in territorio Nucerie quod michi pertinet) and among the witnesses to the document are "the good men of the aforesaid castle of Nocera" (bon[i] predicto castello Nucerie vir[i], probably his vassals. In every other charter he issued from this date on he explicitly recognises the authority of his brother, Prince Robert I of Capua. A diploma Jordan issued in September 1111, with the consent of his brother, in favour of the monastery of Santissima Trinità di Cava de' Tirreni is dated by the reign of Duke William II of Apulia. Although this is an isolated case, it suggests that Capuan control of Nocera was not entirely effective and that at times the Hautevilles were able to make themselves felt there, or that Jordan perhaps played both powers against each other, taking advantage of the ambiguity of Nocera's status.

Throughout his rule at Nocera, Jordan was on very good terms with the monastery of Cava. In the diploma of September 1111, he confirmed Abbot Peter's properties in his territory, delineating precisely their boundaries, and, along with some of his vassals, undertook to defend them. A few days later, in the presence of Sergius of Sorrento, among others, Jordan swore to protect the person of the abbot and several fortresses belonging to the abbey, including the strategic castle of Sant'Adiutore. In March 1114 Jordan organised a gathering of prominent Normans, including his brother, at Nocera in order to extract oaths from Robert of Eboli and Roger of San Severino to stop their hostile actions against Cava. In January 1115 he confirmed some goods to the monastery of San Massimo di Salerno, a dependency of Cava, which had been forced to take its claims to court against the citizens of Nocera. Jordan also made important concessions to the monastery of San Angelo in Formis, a dependency of Monte Cassino, to which he even gave some of his own inherited land.

== Prince of Capua ==
Jordan was not expected to inherit the Principality of Capua. His eldest brother, Richard II, died childless and was succeeded by Robert I, who died on 3 June 1120. He was followed by an infant son, Richard III, who had already been anointed his co-prince, but who survived him by only a week before dying in unspecified circumstances on 10 June. These deaths paved the way for Jordan's accession that same month, and some modern historians have suggested that he had a hand in his nephew's premature death. He was anointed prince on 4 July. The little known of his princely reign shows him continuing his patronage of the major monastic institutions of the principality. Later that year he did homage to Pope Callistus II.

In November 1120 Jordan confirmed the assets and rights of San Angelo in Formis. In 1121 he granted the chapel of San Fede in the civic palace of Aversa with its properties to the cathedral of San Paolo. That same year he assigned considerable rents to the Diocese of Pozzuoli and the monasteries of San Lorenzo di Capua and San Lorenzo di Aversa. His munificence to the churches was perhaps not entirely innocent and pious. His grant of the strategic castle of Pico to Monte Cassino in February 1125 may disguise his efforts to extend his authority into the remotest parts of the principality, or even into the monastery itself, which was forced to accept a compromise in order to receive the fortress.

Nevertheless, the powers of the princes of Capua were on the wane. The pacts Jordan initiated with Monte Cassino in June 1123 bearing a resemblance to the contemporary pacts of men of lesser rank with the same monastery, perhaps indicating the prince's diminished importance in the politics of the age. His generosity, however, was not forgotten: Jordan II is the only prince of Capua after Jordan I whose death, on 19 December 1127 at an unspecified location, is recorded in the Cassinese necrology. He was succeeded by his eldest son, Robert II, the last Prince of Capua.

== Notes ==
Preceded by none	Lord of Nocera; 1109–1127	Succeeded by Robert II
Preceded by Richard III	Count of Aversa; 1120–1127	Succeeded by Robert II
Preceded by Richard III	Prince of Capua; 1120–1127	Succeeded by Robert II
