= Siege of Mytilene (1501) =

Failed Venetian siege on Ottoman Lesbos

- Part of Ottoman–Venetian War (1499–1503)
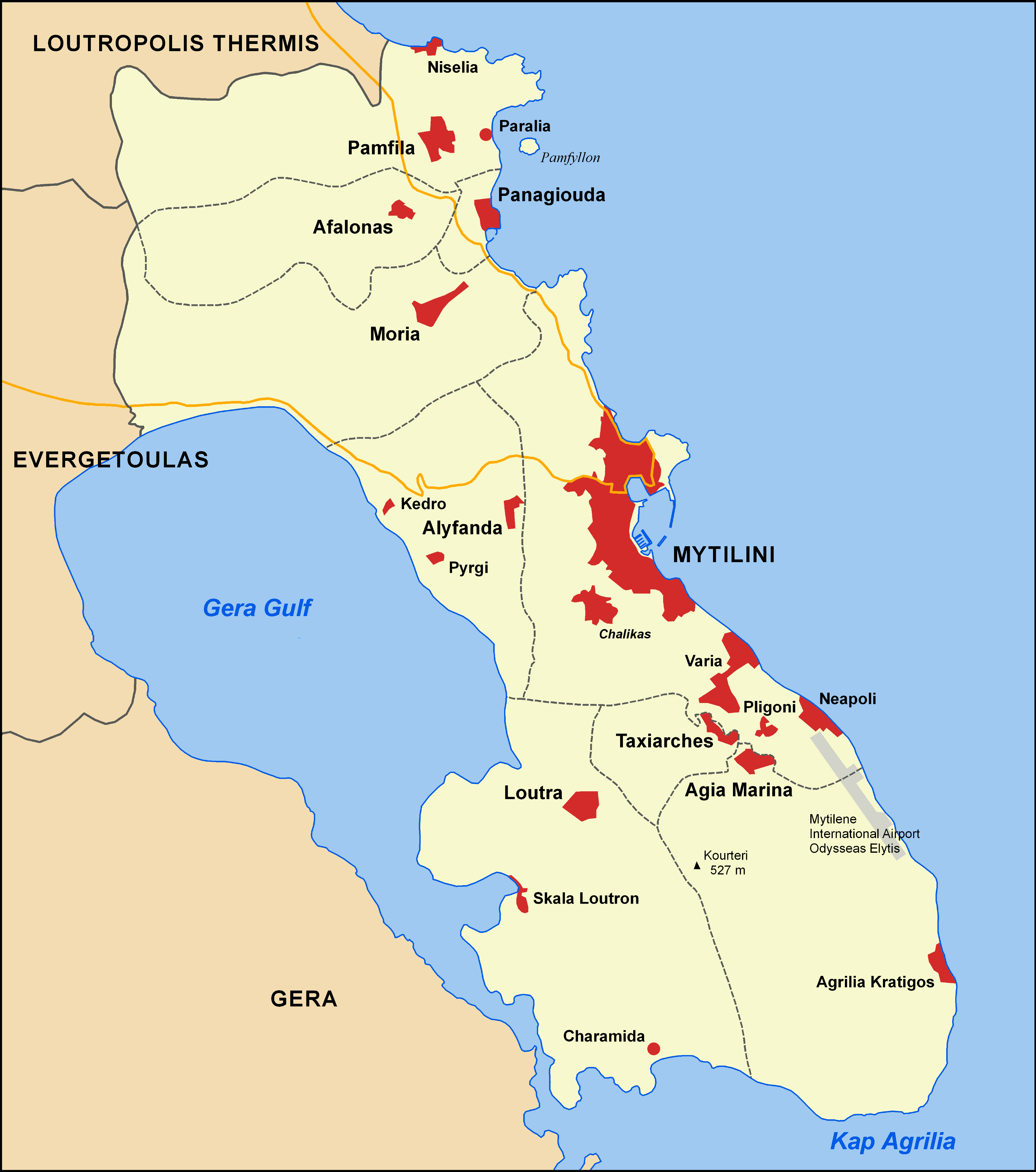
- City of Mytilene
Date	October 1501
Location	Mytilene, Lesbos
Result	Ottoman victory

Belligerents
Ottoman Empire	Republic of Venice; Kingdom of France; Republic of Genoa

Commanders and leaders
Mir Mahmud	Benedetto Pesaro; Philip of Ravenstein

Strength
600 men	10,000 men 80 ships

Casualties and losses
Unknown	Heavy

The Siege of Mytilene was a military engagement between the Ottoman garrison and the Venetian-French-Genoese armada in 1501. The Venetians, allied with the French and Genoese laid siege to Mytilene, the capital of Lesbos. After a 20-day siege, the operation ended in failure for the allies, who suffered heavy losses.

== Background ==
When the news reached Pope Alexander VI regarding the fall of Coron and Modon by the Ottomans, he dispatched papal legates to Europe calling for a Crusade. France, Hungary, and Spain answered the call. The Crusader fleet composed of French, Spanish, Papal, and Venetian ships, set out in autumn and easily captured Cephalonia and Navarino in 1500. The next year, the Christians launched raids individually. Benedetto Pesaro was appointed as the new admiral of the Venetian fleet. The Venetians, allied with the French and Genoese, sailed with 80 ships carrying 10,000 men. The French-Genoese forces were led by Philip of Cleves, Lord of Ravenstein. Their aim was Mytilene, the capital of Lesbos island.

When the Ottoman Sultan, Bayezid II, learned of the upcoming Crusader attack, he immediately issued orders to the Karasi Sanjak, commanding them to go there, strengthen the castle, and take charge of the defense. The governor of Lesbos, Mir Mahmud, welcomed the reinforcements and together they assessed the situation and prepared for battle.

== Siege ==
In October 1501, the Crusader fleet arrived on Lesbos. 600 armored cavalrymen landed on the island and began ravaging the island. The Ottoman garrison consisted of only 600 men. The Crusader fleet surrounded the castle and launched their first assault using cannon fire, muskets, and arrows. The Ottoman garrison defended valiantly and repelled the attack. Days later, another assault was launched. The Crusaders bombarded the castle with heavy cannons and successfully created a breach. The Ottomans repelled the assault by pouring boiling oil and throwing tar and pitch.

A third assault was launched, this time using ladders, the Crusaders managed to capture some towers and raise their banners on it. The Ottomans responded by launching fire arrows at the Christian armada, many ships caught fire and retreated. This demoralized the attackers who then retreated; the French commander of the assault was killed while retreating from the tower. His death was mourned for three days. A fourth assault was launched in which they briefly retook the castle again and raised their flags but failed in the end. The Ottoman garrison was weakened and exhausted by the constant fighting.

Learning of an upcoming Ottoman relief force, the Crusaders broke off the siege and retreated after 20 days of fighting. Eventually, when a land army under Hersek-zade arrived, the found the island was empty of the Crusaders.

== Aftermath ==
As a result, the French abandoned the crusade and returned home. A letter on November 13 from Benedetto Pesaro to the Hospitaller Grand Master of Rhodes expressed his disappointment at the attitude of the French during the siege. The Ottoman victory was celebrated in a lengthy narrative poem.

== Sources ==
- Emanuel Buttigieg (2016), Islands and Military Orders, C.1291-c.1798.
- Kenneth M. Setton (1989), A History of the Crusades, Vol VI, The Impact of the Crusades on Europe.
- Ömer Özkan (2008), The Ghazavat Name of Mytilene and its Value in Terms of Turkish Language and Cultural History (In Turkish).
- Clarence Dana Rouillard (1941), The Turk in French History, Thought, and Literature (1520–1660).
- Bernard Lewis (2014), The Muslim Discovery of Europe.
