= Richard of Capua =

Richard of Capua may refer to:

- Richard I of Capua (died 1078), count of Aversa and prince of Capua
- Richard II of Capua (died 1105/1106), called the Bald, count of Aversa and the prince of Capua
- Richard III of Capua (died 1120), count of Aversa and prince of Capua
