= Romuald of Salerno =

Romuald of Salerno may refer to:

- Romuald (cardinal) (d. 1136), archbishop of Salerno from 1121
- Romuald Guarna (c. 1110–1182), archbishop of Salerno from 1153
