= Romuald I =

Romuald I may refer to:

- Romuald I of Benevento (d. 687), duke of Benevento
- Romuald (cardinal) (d. 1136), archbishop of Salerno as Romuald I
