= William, Count of Monte Sant'Angelo =

William (died after 1104) was the Count of Monte Sant'Angelo from 1102 to 1104. He succeeded his brother, Henry, on his death.

According to the Chronica Montasterii Casinensis of Leo of Ostia, William (Guilelmus), whom Leo calls comes civitatis montis Sancti Michahelis archangeli ("count of the city of Saint Michael the Archangel"), made a donation to Montecassino in April 1100. The passage mentions his brother with no indication of his death, but he had perhaps already died by then, though he was not certainly dead until August 1103, probably dying 21 December 1102.

In October 1104, Roger Borsa, Duke of Apulia and William's nominal overlord, besieged William in Monte Sant'Angelo and expelled him, abolishing his county. William's subsequent fate is unknown.

== Sources ==
- Chalandon, Ferdinand. Histoire de la domination normande en Italie et en Sicile. Paris, 1907.
- Caravale, Mario (ed). Dizionario Biografico degli Italiani LXII Dugoni – Enza. Rome, 1993.
- Jahn, W. Unersuchungen zur normannischen Herrschaftsbildung in Süditalien (1040–1100). Phil. Diss. Munich, 1988.
