= Landulf II =

Landulf II may refer to:

- Landulf II of Capua (c. 825 – 879)
- Landulf II of Benevento (died 961)
- Landulf II (Archbishop of Benevento) (died 1119)
