= Siege of Capua (1098) =

== Introduction ==
The siege of Capua was a military operation involving the states of medieval Southern Italy, beginning in May 1098 and lasting forty days. It was a significant and unordinary siege historically because it was not just a conflict over the principality of Capua. It revealed the politically fragmented, diverse and religiously sophisticated region that resulted in the synthesization of major powers to gain strategic land that would grant the Normans more influence over the surrounding principalities. The siege was significant because it uncovered how Norman expansion depended on religious authority and cooperation of diverse populations, not just brute military force.

== Broader Norman Expansion ==
The siege of Capua was a battle that was a part of a broader Norman expansion within Southern Italy during the late eleventh century. The siege was crucial to the augmentation due to the fact that it consolidated many different groups such as the Lombard, Byzantine and Muslim people that would pay dividends for the Normans. The siege turned Capua into one of the foundational political centers for the Norman empire that would prove to be vital for their rule over the region in the following years after the siege.

Historian G.A. Loud framed this siege as a foundation for a later political agenda that would be established by the Normans. Some historians also view the siege not as simple military conflict, but rather a socially constructed institutional development.

== Importance of Capua ==
The principality of Capua was located in an area that would have given significant advantage to whoever was in control of the land. Capua was located inland, but was also connected to many major trade routes that held Lombard, Byzantine, and Norman Interests. Due to these major trade lines, this meant that Capua had major influence over the surrounding principalities and the diverse populations within them. The Normans saw Capua as a strategic advantage over the rest of the region that would give them essential power over the region.

== The siege ==
The siege was instigated by Richard II, prince of Capua, who had been exiled from his own capital for seven years (1091–1098) by Lando IV until, reaching his majority, he requested the aid of his great uncle, the count of Sicily, Roger I, and his first cousin once removed, the duke of Apulia, Roger Borsa. The two Rogers came, the former in exchange for the city of Naples and the latter for Richard's recognition of Apulian suzerainty.

Roger of Sicily had lately arrested Robert, bishop of Troina and Messina, whom Pope Urban II had given the legateship of Sicily, though Roger himself was holding it. Embroiled in such controversy, the pope came down to discuss it with Roger, who released Robert. The pope's presence caused the saintly archbishop of Canterbury, a Lombard, Anselm of Aosta, then in self-exile from King William II of England, to go to meet the pope. According to Eadmer, Anselm's biographer, "the Lord Pope and Anselm were neighbours at the siege."

Eadmer also gives us an interesting portrait of the Arabs, whose brown tents Anselm found "innumerable." According to Eadmer, many Arabs, impressed by tales of Anselm's holiness, visited his tent for food and other gifts. The biographer goes on to say that the count, whose soldiers the Saracens were, would not allow them, though many would readily have done so, to convert to the Roman Catholic faith. "With what policy—if one can use that word—he did this, is no concern of mine: that is between God and himself." The policy, so inconceivable to Eadmer, is probably explained in this way: by maintaining a third religious and cultural party (other than Latin or Greek Christian) on the island, he assured that he could always have an ally, should either Muslim or Greek oppose him, a Latin. It also assured the presence of an "outlet for the military instincts and talents of his Muslim subjects," according to historian John Julius Norwich.

== Aftermath ==
When the city surrendered, Richard was reinstated, Roger Borsa accepted his homage, and the pope and Roger of Sicily retired to Salerno.

The aftermath of the siege also was a part of a greater consolidation process of many diverse cultures within the region that were now being overseen by the central Norman rule. The Norman expansion required its leaders to manage and integrate these populations to serve as a benefit for their empire. They also were forced to integrate these populations considering that the Normans were substantially outnumbered in regard to population. According to historians such as G.A. Loud, this siege was vital for the Normans as it became one of the main key political centers that was implemented to manage a large and culturally diverse population.

== The Church ==
The Church of Southern Italy was described by G.A Loud as an important resource for Norman rule. The Church was used to legitimize their power as a way to manage the diverse population they were left with after the Siege. Coercing the Lombard and Byzantine people into allowing for immediate Norman rule after conquering their land was not an easy task. Loud argues that the main reason that the Normans used the church to help legitimize their authority was because it was a channel for their laws and regulations to be enforced by the church and accepted by the people. However, this process was gradual and took time for the population adopt this idea.

=== Amatus of Montecassino ===
This chronicle “History of the Normans” written by Amatus of Montecassino around the time of the siege describes an account of what Norman expansion actually looked like. The chronicle frames Norman victories in war (such as the siege of Capua *1098) as evidence of God's favor in their endeavors. On the other hand, the chronicle suggests that a defeat would be seen as a divine punishment for the Norman people. The Normans believed that these victories of battle were of a divine gift from God due to their good works.

== Later political developments ==
Historians such as Hubert Houben suggest that the siege of Capua was a staple battle that led to later developments that sought to make Roger II the leader for the Kingdom of Sicily. This interpretation of the siege contributes to the idea that it led to a broader centralization of power within the region of Southern Italy. Eventually, the Kingdom of Sicily would turn into one of the most complex and diverse systems of its time, situating Capua as a vital piece to the puzzle.

== Sources ==
- Southern, R. W. Saint Anselm and His Biographer. Cambridge, 1963.
- Norwich, John Julius. The Normans in the South 1016-1130. Longmans: London, 1967.
