= Jacopo Pesaro being presented by Pope Alexander VI to Saint Peter =

Painting by Titian

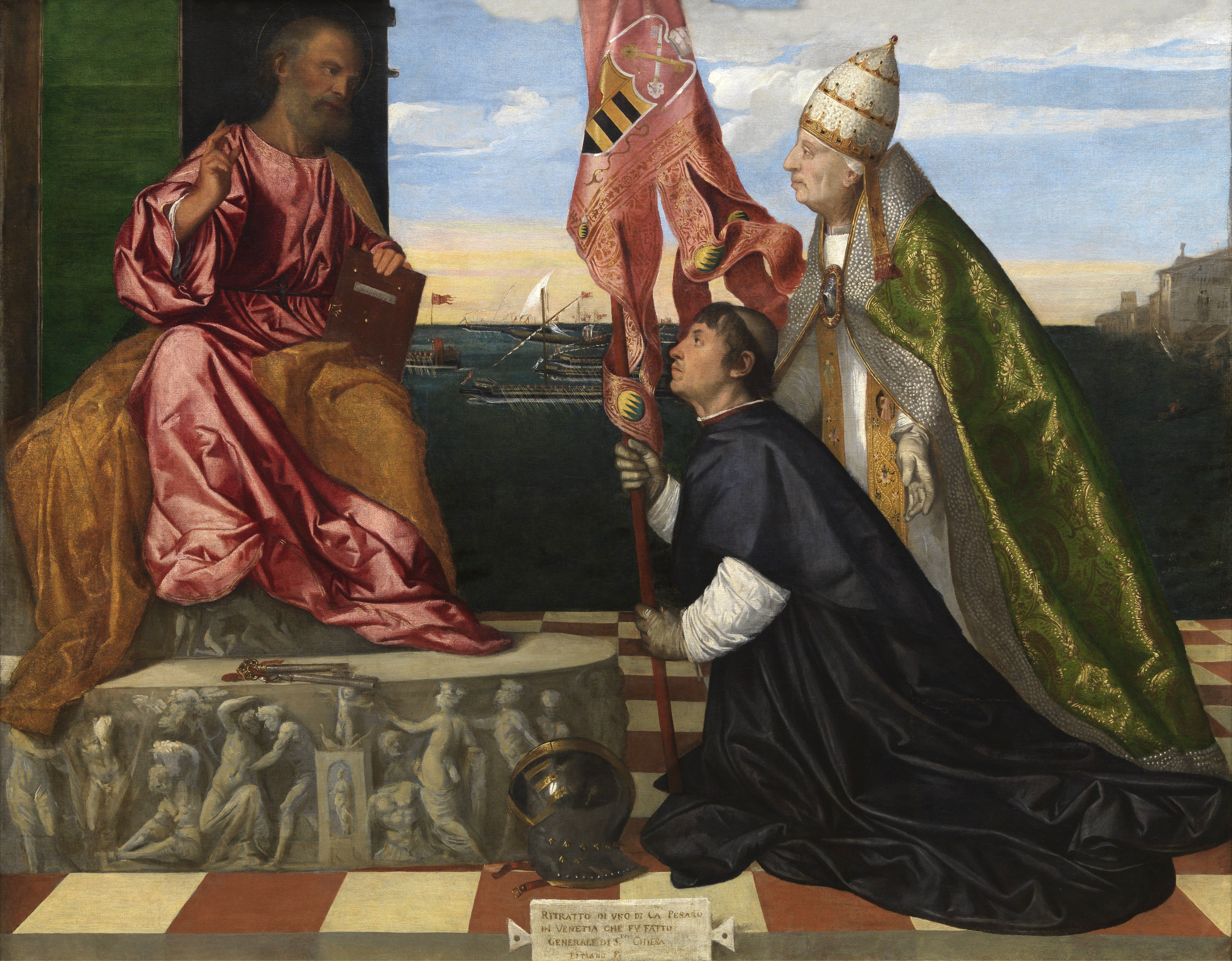
- Artist: Titian
- Year: c. 1506–1511
- Medium: oil on canvas
- Dimensions: 145 cm × 183 cm (57 in × 72 in)
- Location: Royal Museum of Fine Arts, Antwerp

Jacopo Pesaro being presented by Pope Alexander VI to Saint Peter is an oil painting on canvas by Titian, now in the Royal Museum of Fine Arts in Antwerp.

It was commissioned by Bishop Jacopo Pesaro (b. 1460) as an ex-voto for the Venetian naval victory leading to the retaking of Santa Maura (Lefkada) from the Ottoman Turks in August 1502, a rare victory in the Ottoman–Venetian War (1499–1503), which concluded the next year with Venetian concessions, including the return of Santa Maura. Pesaro, a member of the patrician Pesaro family, was appointed by the Borgia Pope Alexander VI as a papal legate, commander of the Papal fleet in the region, and bishop of Paphos on Cyprus, a Greek island which was then a Venetian territory.

It has sometimes been thought to be Titian's earliest painting, dating to as early as 1503, but this is now not believed, and a date nearer 1510–11 seems more likely.

== Description ==
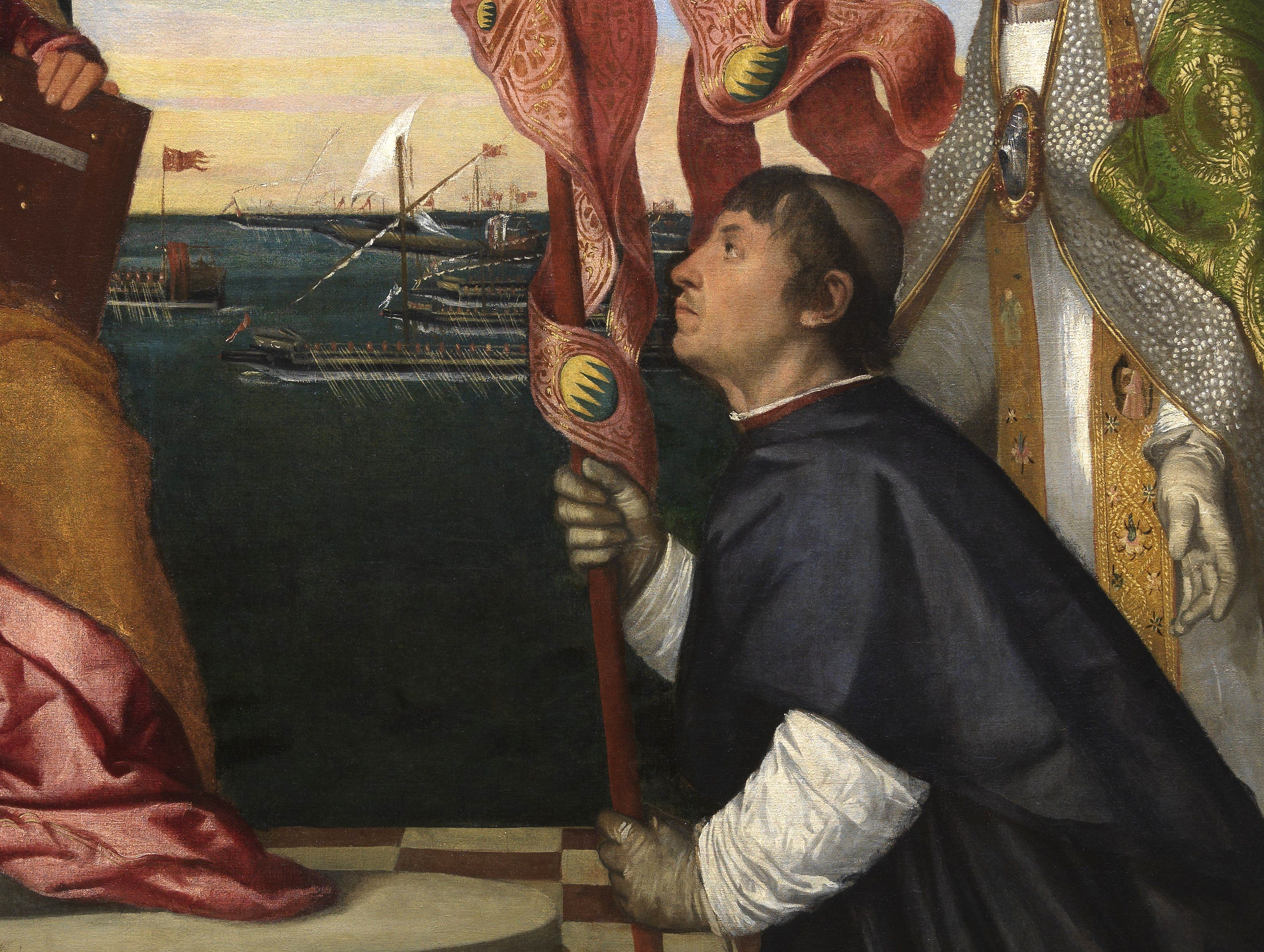
Detail of Pesaro and the galleys

Saint Peter is enthroned at left, holding a book and with his gold and silver keys on the dais below him, which is appropriately made of petra, stone. Pope Alexander VI, the pope at the time of the battle, presents the kneeling Jacopo Pesaro to him. Pesaro carries a standard with Alexander's coat of arms. Below the saint classical-style sculpted reliefs are shown at two levels. As in the similar reliefs in the later Sacred and Profane Love, their exact subject matter has eluded identification, but Venus and Cupid seem to feature. This may just allude to Paphos, which in classical times was sacred to Venus, or, as the museum suggests, be an allegory which "demonstrates how Pesaro, through his love of God, achieved victory on Santa Maura".

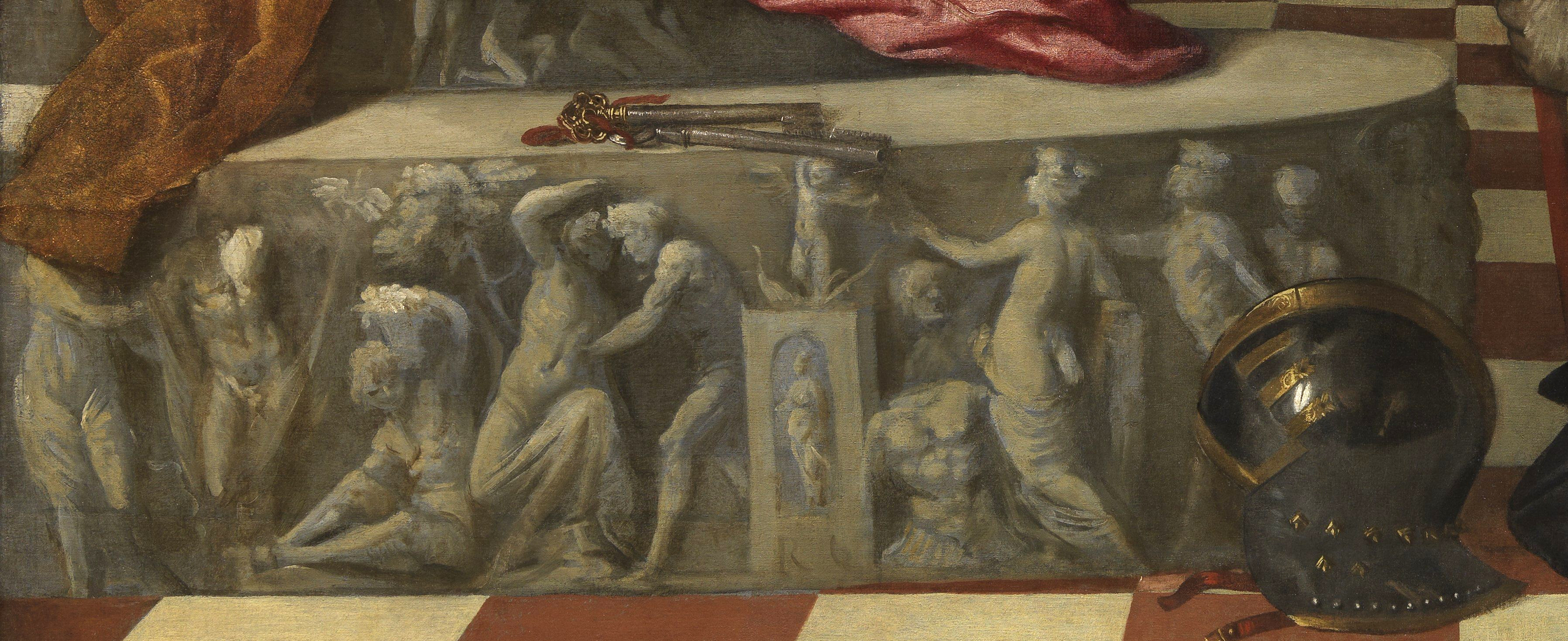
Detail of the frieze and helmet

Pesaro has taken off his helmet, which sits beside the dais. Alexander had contributed 13 galleys to the mainly Venetian war effort, the Venetian fleet being commanded by Benedetto Pesaro, Jacopo's cousin. Between Pesaro's head and Peter war-galleys can be seen in action, and to the right of Alexander more sea, ending at the town of Lefkada, or perhaps one on Paphos.

Apart from these specifics, the composition adapts the usual Venetian formula for an ex-voto of the donor being presented to the Virgin Mary by their patron saint, especially as developed by Giovanni Bellini, in whose studio Titian spent some time. The museum suggest that Bellini designed the painting, leaving the execution to Titian. Undoubtedly the figure of the saint is strongly reminiscent of Bellini's style, as is the pose of the pope. The latter's features were evidently copied from a medal or other image, so he is much less lively in appearance than the bishop, who was probably painted from live sittings.

The tablet at centre bottom is a later addition, which identifies the artist and explains the subject (in notably vague terms), reading "Ritratto di uno di casa Pesaro in Venetia che fu fatto generale di S.ta Chiesa. Tiziano F.[ecit]" ("Portrait of one of the Pesaro family of Venice who was made a general of the holy church. Titian made this").

Despite some faults in the painting, Pesaro must been sufficiently satisfied to commission Titian in 1518–19 to paint the important Pesaro Altarpiece, still in the church of Santa Maria Gloriosa dei Frari, a key work in the artist's development, which again dwells on his victory in 1502.

== Dating ==
Traditionally dated to 1506–1511, there have been suggestions that instead it belongs to 1503–1506, which would make it the earliest surviving work by the artist, then less than twenty years old on the usual dating for his undocumented birth, which is 1488–90. But older estimates for his birthdate were usually earlier, and a date of 1503, meaning an artist of 13 or 14, seems barely credible. An early date was backed by Giovanni Battista Cavalcaselle (d. 1897), Adolfo Venturi (d. 1941) and Gronau and opposed by Pallucchini, Roberto Longhi and Morassi, among others. Hourticq dates it to 1515 (assuming an official intervention by Giovanni Bellini) and Suida to between 1512 and 1520. X-rays, however, have revealed a uniform colour texture, contradicting hypotheses that it was a draft expanded over time by several hands.

Restoration shortly before 2003 has confirmed that it relates more closely to "the monumental style Titian developed around 1510-11".

It has been claimed that it must have been commissioned in the immediate aftermath of the battle and before 1503, since the militaristic pope Alexander VI died that year and from then on he was banned from official representations, in a kind of damnatio memoriae. However Pesaro did not return to Venice until 1506, and if the prohibition on images ever affected Venice, it is unlikely to have done in 1508–1510, when Venice and the Papacy were on opposite sides in the War of the League of Cambrai. While Alexander was generally "despised" after his death, Pesaro remained loyal to the memory of his patron, and his will of 1542 left money for masses to be said for Alexander's soul.

== Provenance ==
It belonged to the Pesaro family until the early 17th century, and was presumably first hung in Pesaro's home. Anthony van Dyck made a drawing of it in Venice in 1623, the earliest documentation for the work. It is recorded as having been in the collection of Charles I of England, from which it was bought in 1652 for the Spanish royal collection after his execution, which loaned it to the convent of San Pasquale in Madrid. In 1823, it was in the collection of William I of the Netherlands, who gave it to the museum.

== See also ==
- List of works by Titian
