= Girolamo Zane =

Venetian military officer (1495–1572)

- Born: 1495; Venice, Republic of Venice
- Died: 13 October 1572 (aged 76–77) Venice, Republic of Venice
- Allegiance: Republic of Venice (1516–1572)
- Branch: (Republic of Venice) Venetian Navy
- Rank: Captain General of the Sea
- Conflicts: Ottoman–Venetian War

Girolamo Zane (1495 – 13 October 1572) was a Capitano generale da Mar of the Venetian fleet during the War of Cyprus.

After being sent to Costantinople as the Venetian bailo in 1542, in 1566 he was appointed Capitano generale da Mar, receiving power on 27 March 1570. The same year he commanded the Venetian fleet in the unsuccessful expedition to save Cyprus, attacked by the Ottoman Empire. In December, his request for leave was accepted. Back in Venice he was arrested for alleged failures in the management of the fleet during the mission in the East. He died in prison on 13 October 1572.

== Biography ==
He was born in Venice in 1495, to Bernardo di Girolamo, from the so-called branch of S. Polo, and Elisabetta Morosini di Roberto, who were married in 1487. He had at least three siblings: Pietro, a canon of Treviso, Carlo, Savio agli Ordini, counselor in Rethymno, Provveditore alla Sanità; and sister Giovanna. On 31 May 1531, having returned to Venice after an adventure in Alessandria and five years spent in Damascus, where he was consul, he married Elisabetta Vitturi di Matteo, by whom he had four children: Bernardo, a senator and counselor; Matteo, ambassador; Agnes, wife of Alvise Venier di Lorenzo; and Maria, wife of Giovanni Soranzo di Francesco.

In 1542 he was sent to Constantinople as the Venetian ambassador (bailo) a position he held until 1544. In that same year, he was elected captain of Padua and, in 1558, of Verona.

=== War of Cyprus ===
On 28 March 1570 the ambassador of the Ottoman sultan Selim arrived in Venice, with the request for the surrender of the island of Cyprus. This was flatly rejected by the Council, who instead prepared for war, having already put Zane in command of the fleet on 27 March 1570, Monday of Easter.

The Venetian fleet, commanded by Zane, then moved to Zara on 3 April to wait for the other galleys. During the long stop in Zara a terrible epidemic of petechial typhus broke out which decimated the crews and which was to affect the expedition in the future. On 30 May Zane was ordered to head to Corfu where he was to join Gianandrea Doria's fleet if they reached them in time. However, the Capitano generale da Mar had to wait until all the galleys were available and only reached Corfu on 29 June, where there was no trace of Doria.

On 23 July the Venetian fleet headed east and, after having made stopovers in Kefalonia, Zakynthos and Modone, arrived on 4 August in Candia. The orders given to Zane required him to head immediately to Cyprus, but the captain general decided to wait until he had substituted all the rowers who died during the epidemic.

In the meantime, on 6 August, Marcantonio Colonna had arrived in Otranto with the 12 papal galleys and was awaiting the arrival of Gianandrea Doria from Messina to set sail to the east. The latter however, not completely convinced of the whole project, deliberately delayed the reunion with Colonna, which took place only on 21 August. The following day the fleet headed for Crete where it arrived on 31 August.

Despite Doria's attempts to mess everything up, accusing the Venetian fleet of being in poor condition, the Holy League sailed from the port of Sitia on the night of 17-18 September. Alvise Bembo was sent in advance near Castelrosso. He returned with the news that the Turks had conquered Nicosia.

This news further undermined the fragile balance of the alliance and in the war council of 22 September the Venetians were unable to impose the continuation of the expedition against the Turks. The fleet withdrew that same evening to Crete and from there to Italy.

In December 1570 his request for leave was accepted and on 13 December he was replaced by Agostino Barbarigo first and then Sebastiano Venier.

=== The process ===
Returning to Venice on 11 April, Zane was arrested for alleged failures in fleet management during the mission to the East. During the trial many officers were called to testify, including Marcantonio Colonna, who always proved to be kind to the Zane claiming that he had no fault for the failed expedition. The trial lasted for a long time and, before being able to hear the sentence, Zane died in prison on 13 October 1572.

== Bibliography ==
- Barbero, Alessandro (2010). Lepanto. La battaglia dei tre imperi. Bari: Laterza. ISBN 978-88-420-8893-6.
- Molmenti, Pompeo. Sebastiano Veniero E La Battaglia Di Lepanto: Studio. Nabu Press. ISBN 978-1-276-12354-9.
