= Bernard of Carinola =

Italian Roman Catholic saint

Saint Bernard of Carinola

Bishop of Carinola
- Born: Capua, Italy
- Died: 1109; Carinola, Campania, Italy
- Venerated in: Roman Catholic Church
- Feast: 12 March
- Patronage: Carinola, Campania, Italy

Bernard of Carinola, also known as Bernard of Capua, was Bishop of Carinola. He was the confessor of Duke Richard II of Capua, until appointed the Bishop of Forum Claudii in 1087 by Pope Victor III. He was later transferred to the see of Carinola in 1100. He died in extreme old age in 1109 and is now venerated as the principal patron of Carinola.
