= Sacred and Profane Love =

Painting by Titian

- Amor Sacro e Amor Profano (Italian)
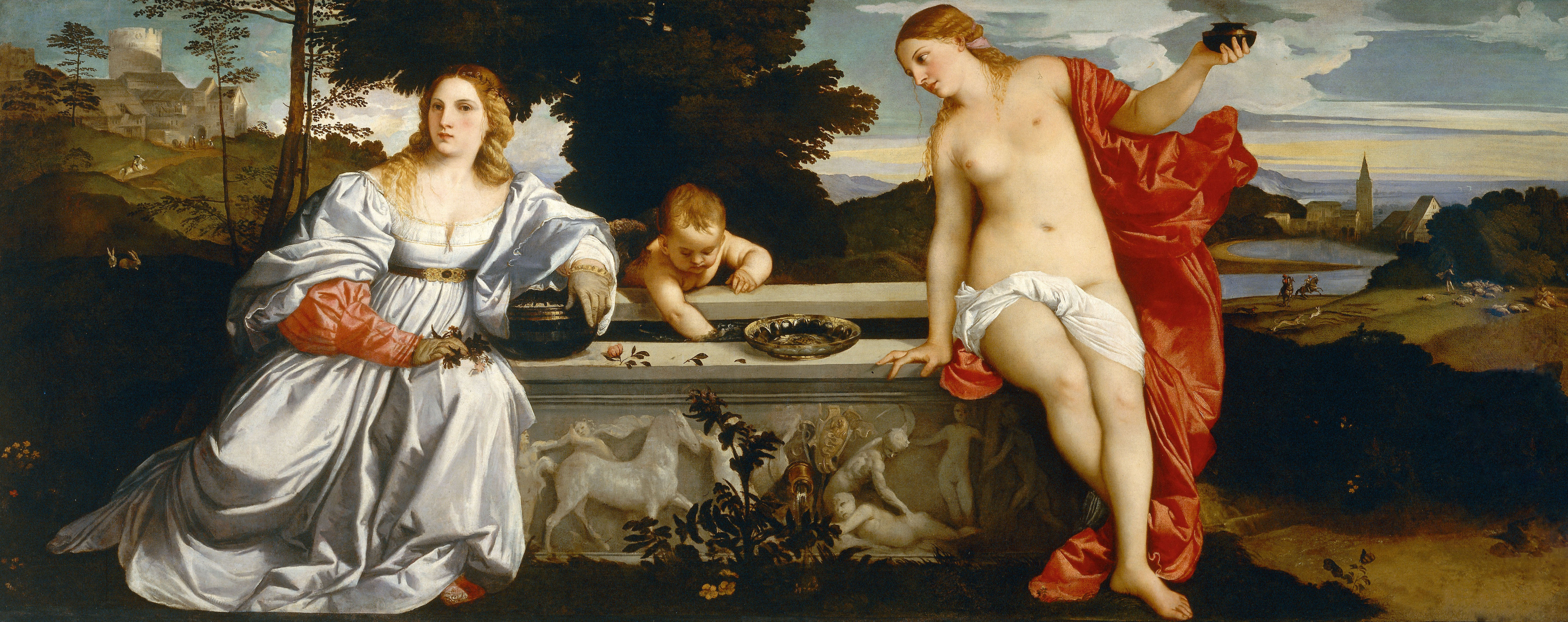
- Artist: Titian
- Year: 1514
- Medium: Oil on canvas
- Dimensions: 118 cm × 279 cm (46 in × 110 in)
- Location: Galleria Borghese, Rome

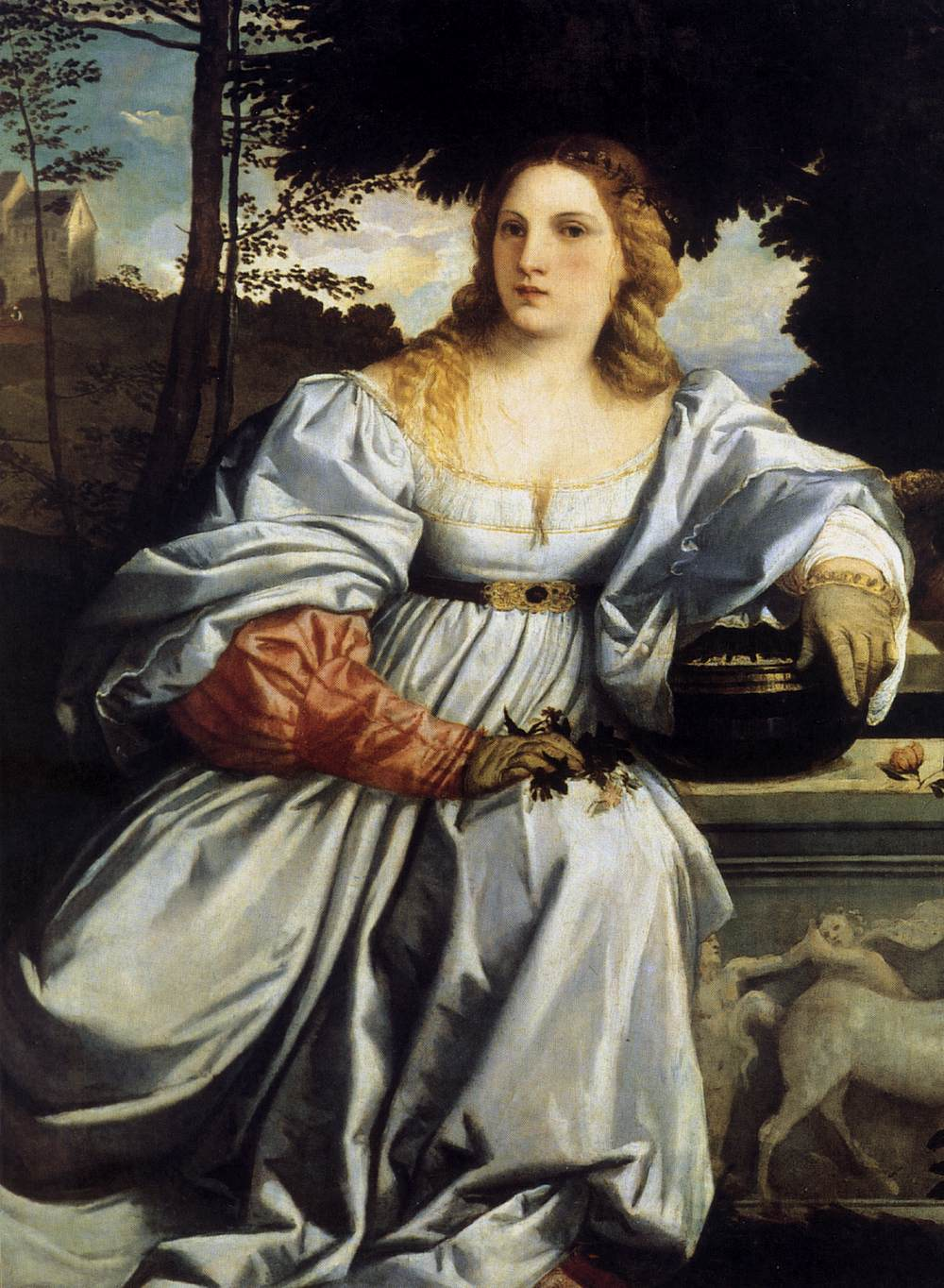
The clothed figure

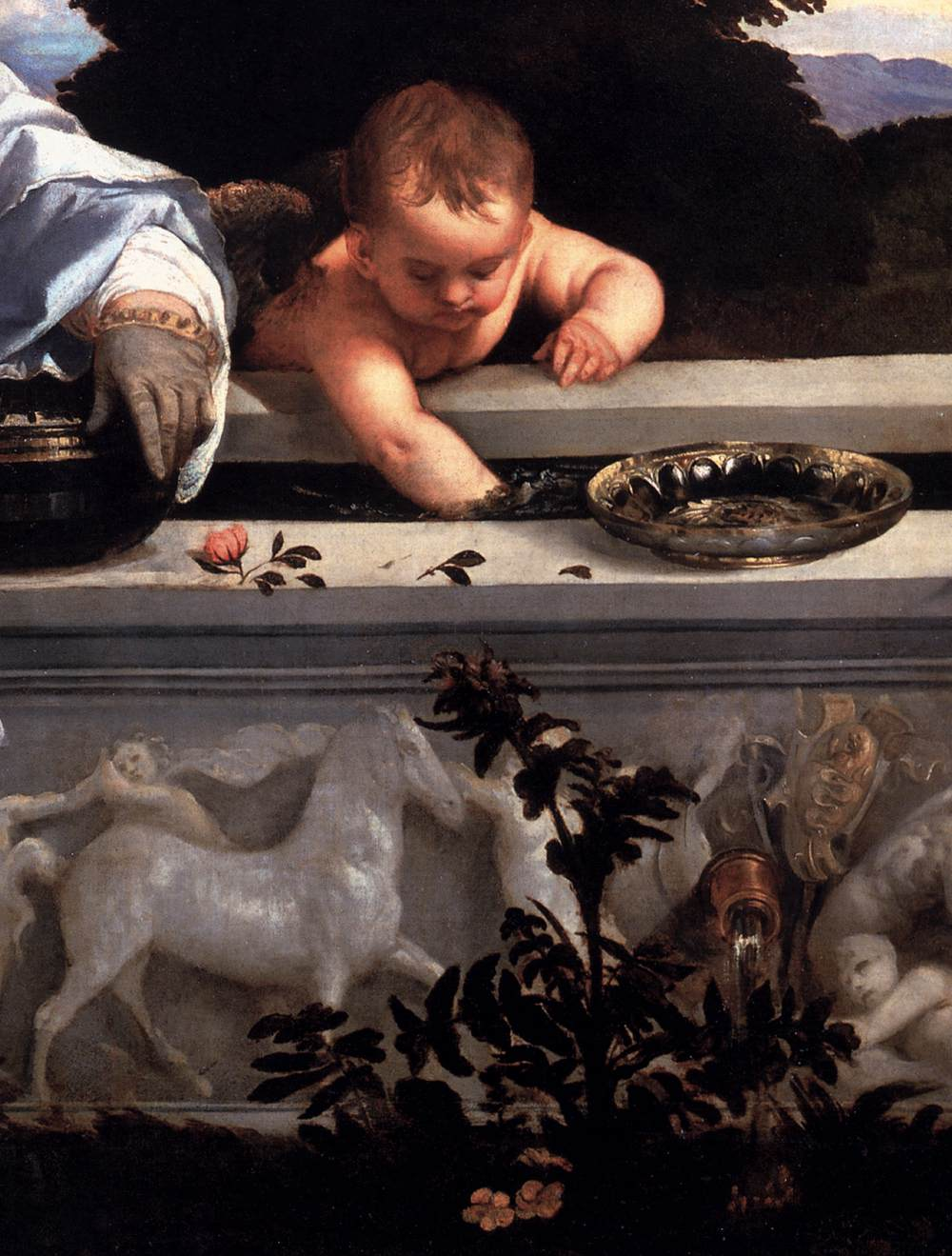
The Cupid and part of the relief

Sacred and Profane Love (Italian: Amor Sacro e Amor Profano) is an oil painting by Titian, probably painted in 1514, early in his career. The painting is presumed to have been commissioned by Niccolò Aurelio, a secretary to the Venetian Council of Ten, whose coat of arms appears on the sarcophagus or fountain, to celebrate his marriage to a young widow, Laura Bagarotto. It perhaps depicts a figure representing the bride dressed in white, sitting beside Cupid and accompanied by the goddess Venus.

The title of the painting is first recorded in 1693, when it was listed in an inventory as Amor Divino e Amor Profano (Divine love and Profane love), and may not represent the original concept at all.

Although "much ink has been spilt by art historians attempting to decipher the iconography of the painting", and some measure of consensus has been achieved, basic aspects of the intended meaning of the painting, including the identity of the central figures, remain disputed.

== Description ==
Two women, who appear to be modelled on the same person, sit on a carved Ancient Roman sarcophagus that has been converted to a water-trough, or a trough made to look like a Roman sarcophagus; the broad ledges here are not found in actual sarcophagi. How the water enters is unclear, but it leaves through a phallic-looking brass spout between the two women, next to an anachronistic coat of arms in the carving. This belongs to Niccolò Aurelio, whose presence in the picture is probably also represented by the spout.

Between the two women is a small winged boy, who may be Cupid, son and companion of Venus, or merely a putto. He is looking intently into the water, and splashing a hand in it. The woman on the left is fully and richly dressed; her clothes are now usually recognized as those of a bride, though in the past they have been said to be typical of courtesan wear. In her hair she wears myrtle, both a flower sacred to Venus and one worn by brides.

In contrast, the woman on the right is nude except for a white cloth over her loins and a large red mantle worn over one shoulder. It was generally recognised by the 20th century that, somewhat contrary to a natural first impression, if the painting indeed represented figures along the lines of Sacred and Profane Love, the clothed figure was "profane love", and the nude one "sacred love". The nude figure sits comfortably on the ledge of the trough, with one hand resting on it and the other held high, holding a vessel with smoke coming out of it, probably an incense-burner. In contrast the pose of the clothed figure, apparently poised and relaxed, becomes rather strange in the lower part of her body when considered carefully, "the lower half of the bride's body is lost in her drapery and does not conform with her upper half". The ledge seems too high for her to be sitting on it properly, and her knees are wide apart. Perhaps she is actually sitting on something else beside the trough, or this may just be one of a number of lapses in depicting anatomy found in Titian's early career.

The clothed woman leans over, but is probably not supported by, a metal bowl whose contents have been described in various ways, despite it not being possible to see them. Another shallow metal bowl is on the ledge, nearer the nude figure; some have proposed a meaning for the decoration inside the bowl, such as the arms of Aurelio's bride, but this does not seem to be the case on close examination, after the picture was cleaned. It would be convenient if the arms were there, as an early objection to the marriage picture theory was that "allusion to a marriage would require two coats of arms, not one".

The carved scenes on the front face of the trough/sarcophagus do not yet have a generally agreed reading. They were described by Edgar Wind as "A man is being scourged, a woman dragged by the hair, and an unbridled horse is led away by the mane", all perhaps images of the taming of the passions. Alternatively they have been seen as (reading right to left): Adam and Eve standing beside the Tree of Knowledge, Cain killing Abel, and the Conversion of Saint Paul, shown falling off his horse. By 1914 they had been claimed to derive from scenes in five different literary works, ancient and modern, reflecting the 19th-century taste for finding literary sources for paintings. They have been connected with the woodcut illustrations to Francesco Colonna's Hypnerotomachia Poliphili (published in Venice in 1499).

The landscape on the left, behind the clothed woman, goes uphill to a what seems to be a walled castle or village dominated by a high defensive tower. There are two rabbits nearby, usually symbols of fecundity or lust in the Renaissance. The landscape behind the unclothed figure stretches downhill, with a village dominated by a church tower and steeple on the far side of water. Two men on horses are hunting a hare or outsized rabbit with fast lurcher-type dogs, and a flock of sheep are apparently tended by a shepherd, with a pair of lovers sitting nearby.

== Meaning ==
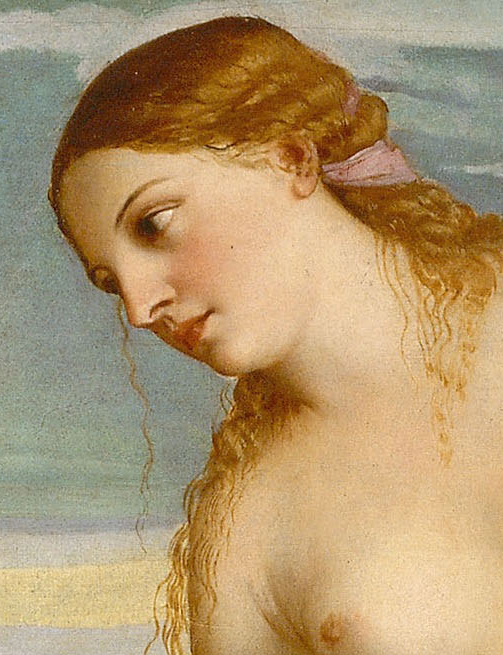
Detail of the nude woman

There have been a number of conflicting interpretations of the painting. Their starting point is to identify the purpose of the painting, which most interpretations in recent decades see as commemorating a marriage. Next the figures, who seem physically identical, but whose clothing is so different, need to be assigned identities, at which point agreement ends. While the trend in recent years has been to downplay complicated and obscure explanations of the iconography of paintings by Titian (and other Venetian painters), in this case no straightforward interpretation has been found, and scholars remain more ready to consider allegorical alternatives of some complexity, Titian would probably not have devised a complicated allegorical meaning himself; it has been suggested that the Renaissance humanist scholar Cardinal Pietro Bembo, or a similar figure, may have devised the allegorical scheme. But the identity of any scholar that could be implicated in furnishing a program to Titian remains pure speculation.

Scholars have proposed several identifications of the figures, and analyses and interpretations which largely flow from these. The concept of Geminae Veneres or "Twin Venuses", a dual nature in Venus, was well developed in both classical thought and Renaissance Neoplatonism. In 1969 the scholar Erwin Panofsky suggested the two figures were representations of the 'Twin Venuses' with the clothed figure representing the 'earthly' Venus - (Venere Vulgare), while the other was 'celestial' (Venere Celeste). This remains the most accepted and convincing interpretation to this day. Others see the clothed figure as representing the bride (idealized, and not a portrait, which would have been rather indecorous in Venice), and only the nude figure representing Venus.

Although the first record of a version of what is now the usual title is only in an inventory of 1693, it remains possible that the two female figures are indeed intended to be personifications of the Neoplatonic concepts of sacred and profane love. The art historian Walter Friedländer outlined similarities between the painting and Francesco Colonna's Hypnerotomachia Poliphili and proposed that the two figures represented Polia and Venere, the two female characters in the 1499 romance.

== Style ==
The composition has elements also found in the works of Titian's former master or colleague Giorgione, an immensely influential Venetian painter who died very young in 1510, but the painting is generally agreed to show that Titian's own style had developed into a maturity that allows no confusion with his old rival. While many works of the previous few years have been disputed between the two artists, there is no question of that here. Titian shows "entire clarity and consistency of purpose, and certainty in the selection of artistic means. After a decade of search in multiple and sometimes contradictory directions, Titian has settled for the basic proposition of classical style that had been expounded by Giorgione, but with precise self-knowledge of the differences of personality and vision — and, not least, of hand — with which could interpret it."

A religious painting of the same period, that has many similarities in style is the Noli me tangere, probably also of 1514 (National Gallery), in which Titian uses much the same group of buildings as at the left here, but reversed and without the tower. These develop from the group in the Dresden Venus.

In Titian's Jacopo Pesaro being presented by Pope Alexander VI to Saint Peter (probably before 1512, Royal Museum of Fine Arts, Antwerp) Saint Peter is enthroned above a painting of a classical relief which can be compared to the one here in size, complexity, and its uncertain subject-matter.

== History ==
The work was bought in 1608 by Cardinal Scipione Borghese, nephew of Pope Paul V and a major collector and patron of art. It is now kept with other works from the Borghese collection in the Galleria Borghese in Rome.

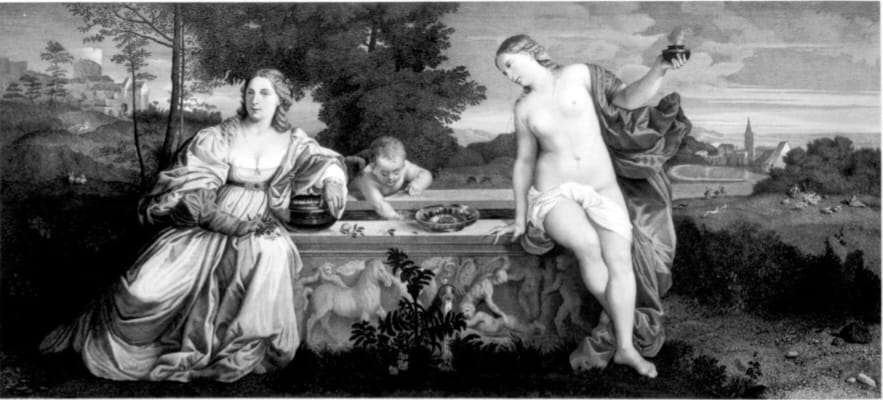
Francesco Di Bartolo, Sacred and Profane Love after Titian, burin engraving, Rome, 1877.

Although the painting remained in the Borghese collection, its image later circulated far beyond the gallery through reproductive printmaking. In the nineteenth century, this process culminated in the large burin engraving produced in 1877 by Francesco Di Bartolo for the Regia Calcografia in Rome. Based on his own preparatory carbon drawing of 1873, now preserved at the Istituto Centrale per la Grafica, the engraving was executed entirely through the traditional, non-photographic process of reproductive engraving and contributed to the wider dissemination of Titian's composition.

== Painting materials ==
The painting was analyzed in 2000 by a variant of x-ray fluorescence spectroscopy which made it possible to identify the pigments used by Titian. The analysis identified lead white, azurite, lead-tin yellow, vermilion and yellow ochre.

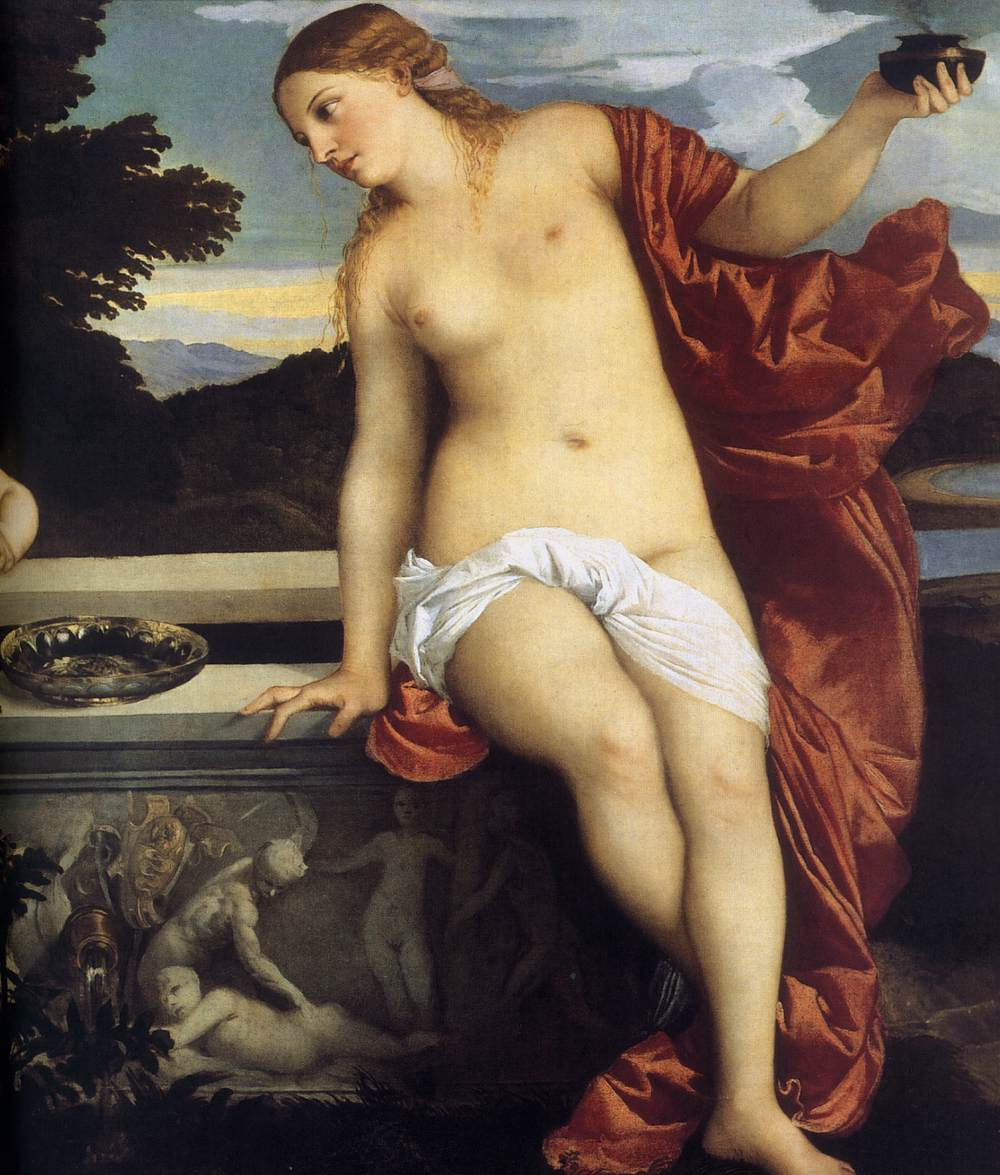
The nude figure

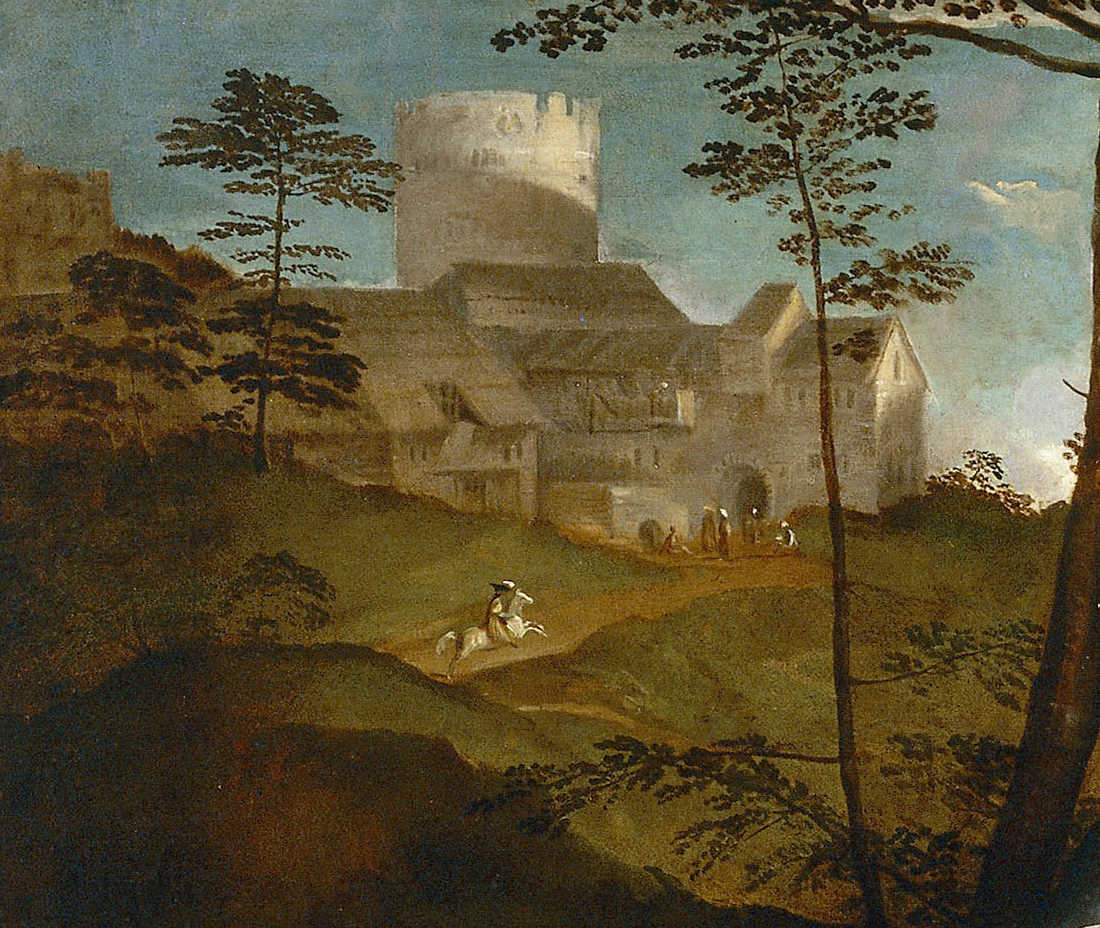
Detail of landscape at left

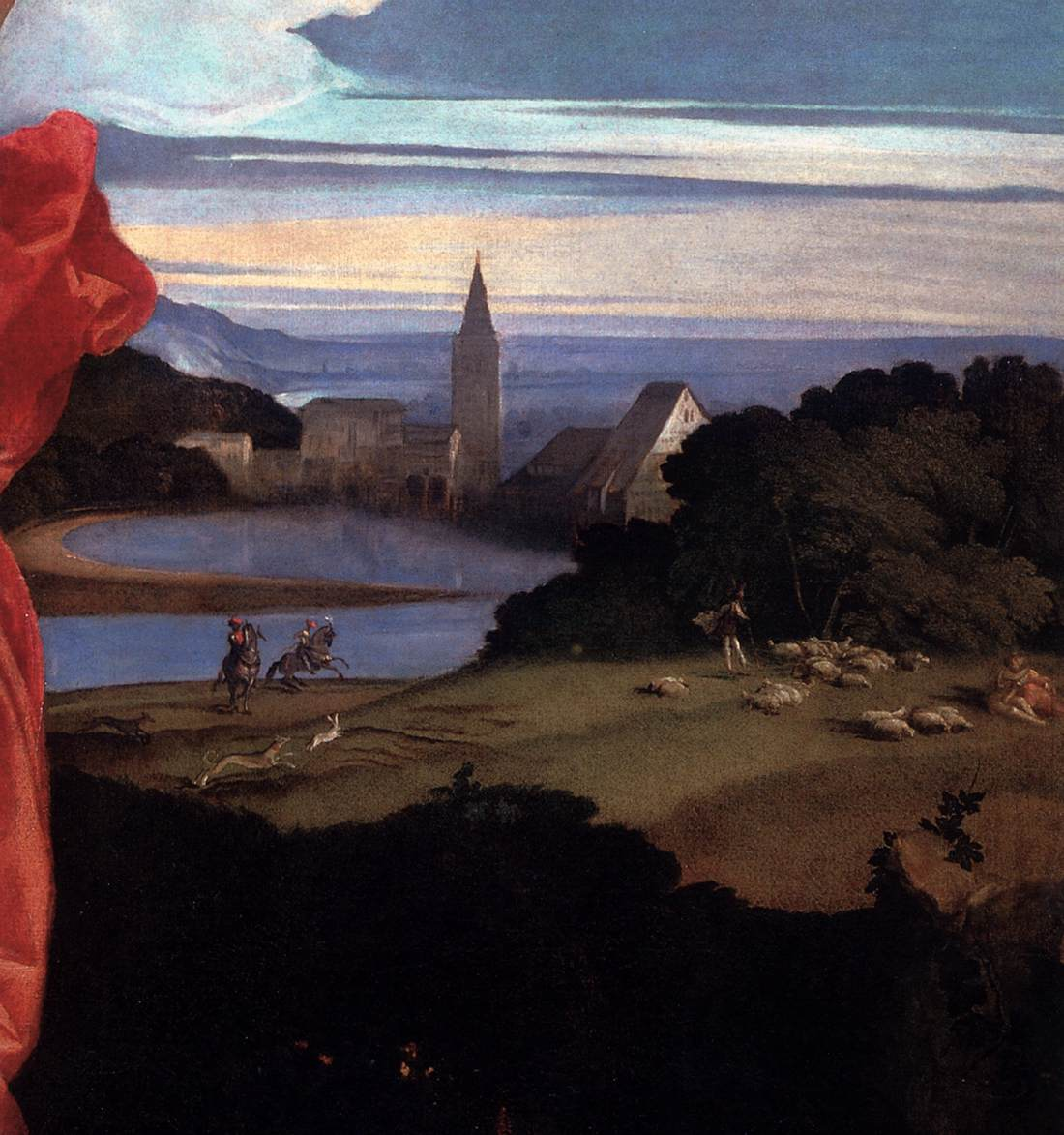
Landscape at right

== See also ==
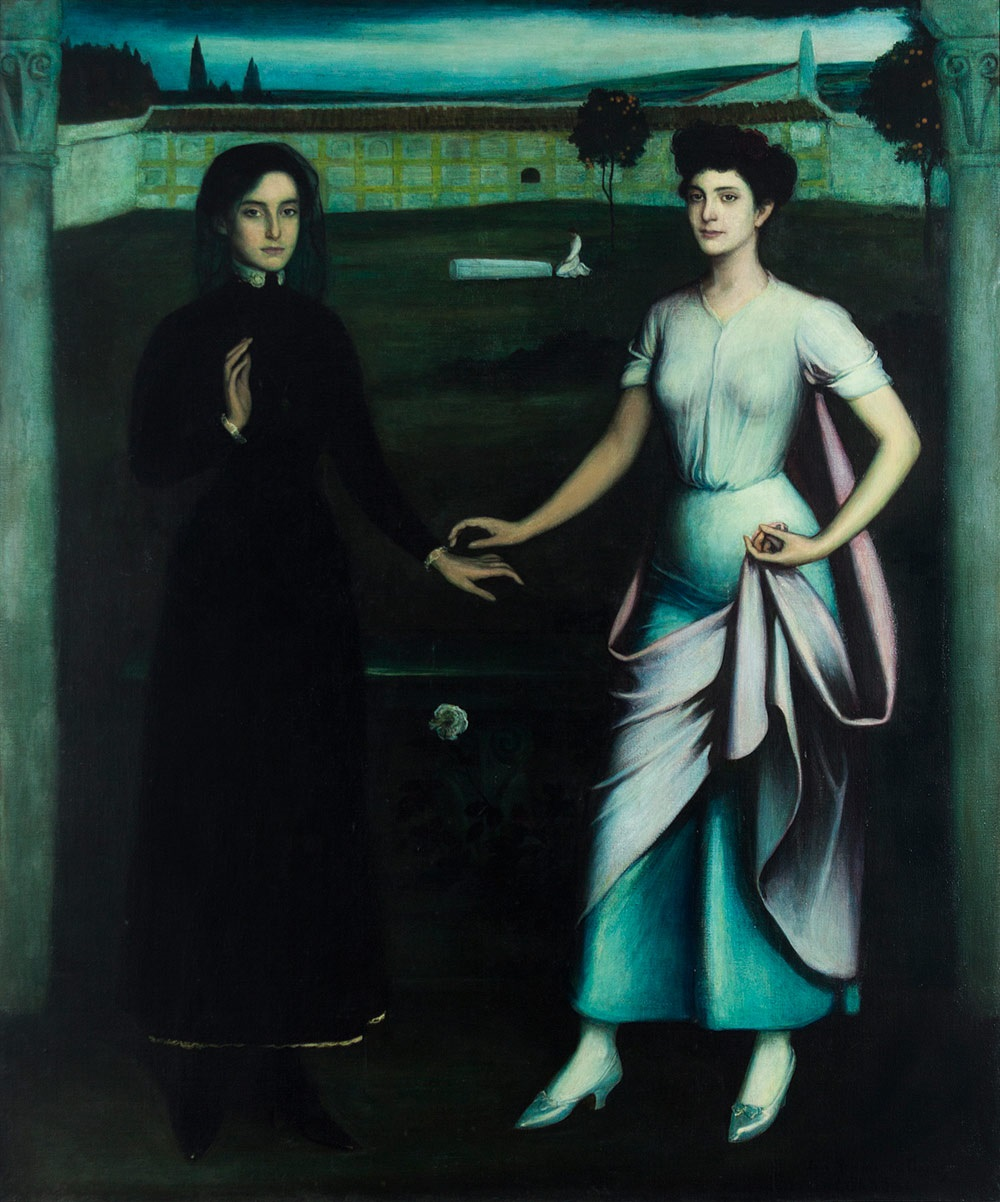
Amor místico y amor profano, 'Mystical love and profane love', a 1908 take by Julio Romero de Torres.

- Profane
- List of works by Titian
