= Fulco of Basacers =

Italo-Norman knight and landholder

Fulco of Basacers (floruit 1083–1120) was an Italo-Norman knight and landholder with considerable possessions in the Val di Crati in Calabria. The seat of his lordship was "Brahalla", a place or castle that no longer exists.

His first appearance in the historical record is in a Greek charter of 1083, where he is named Βαλσωχερεζ (Balsocherez). His name in Latin charters commonly appears as Fulco de Basagerio, but the identification of Basagerio remains elusive. It could be Bazoches in the Nivernais, but more probably he was from Normandy, perhaps Bazoches-au-Houlme or Bazoches-sur-Hoëne. He was powerful enough to mint copper coins (follari) of his own, bearing the inscription FVLCVI DE BASACERS beneath a cross on one side, and two outward-facing busts with a cross between them and the letters RVC on the other. The busts probably represent Fulco and his lord, Roger Borsa, who is probably referenced by RVC. Some of Fulco's coins are overstruck on Salernitan and Amalfitan coins known to date from the 1090s. Probably these coins were minted with Roger's approval. It has been suggested that they were minted at Capua as late as 1134, after Fulco is recorded in that vicinity with Roger II, but such a late date is unlikely. Nor were the coins minted at Salerno, as once suggested.

== Bibliography ==
- Philip Grierson, Mark A. S. Blackburn, and Lucia Travaini, edd. Medieval European Coinage: Italy, III (South Italy, Sicily, Sardinia). Cambridge: Cambridge University Press, 1998.
- Libero Mangieri, Giuseppe. "I follari salernitani a nome di Fulco de Basacers." Actes du XIe congrès international de numismatique. Brussels, 1991. Vol. 3 (1993), pp. 133–39.
