= Jordan I of Capua =

Norman Count and Prince in Southern Italy (c.1046 – 1091)

Sketch of a lead seal depicting the city of Capua (obverse) and Prince Jordan I (reverse).

Jordan I (Italian: Giordano) (c. 1045 – 1091), count of Aversa and prince of Capua from 1078 to his death, was the eldest son and successor of Prince Richard I of Capua and Fressenda, a daughter of Tancred of Hauteville and his second wife, also named Fressenda, and the nephew of Robert Guiscard, duke of Apulia, Calabria, and Sicily. He, according to William of Apulia, "equalled in his virtues both the duke and his father."

In 1071, Jordan briefly rebelled against his father with the support of his uncle, Ranulf. In 1078, while his father was besieging Naples with Robert Guiscard, Jordan and Robert, count of Loritello, were ravaging the Abruzzi, then papal territory. He, his father, and the duke were all excommunicated, when, suddenly, his father fell ill, retired to Capua, reconciled with the church, and died. Jordan, fearing to rule under the ban of the church, called off the siege of Naples and went to Rome to reconcile himself to Pope Gregory VII and rectify his relations with the church, of which his father had been both servant and protector. It appears that he intended to take up the position of his father vis-a-vis the papacy and to return to unfriendly relations with the duke of Apulia, for Gregory visited Capua a mere three months after Richard's death and Jordan, probably with papal prodding, began fomenting revolt in the Guiscard's lands. The revolt, the widely supported and well-organised, was ineffectual in really curbing Robert's influence and power.

One of his chief advisors was the abbot of Montecassino, Desiderius of Benevento, who mediated between the prince and the Emperor Henry IV on the latter's descent into Italy (1081). Jordan forsook his erstwhile papal ally in exchange for an imperial investiture. Though Robert Guiscard and his brother Roger marched against him, Roger was recalled to Sicily and the expedition fell apart.

In 1085, on Robert's death, Jordan supported Bohemond, the elder son, over Roger Borsa, the eldest by Sikelgaita, who was his own sister-in-law, he having married Gaitelgrima, another daughter of Prince Guaimar IV of Salerno. For the next three years, Bohemond held Apulia with the assistance of well-trained Capuan armies. In that same year, the pope died and the antipope Clement III continued to claim the papacy. In hopes of curbing the influence of Clement and united his interests with those of the papacy once again, he pressured the College of Cardinals to elect Desiderius of Montecassino as successor Gregory. At the same time, Roger Borsa freed the captured imperial prefect of Rome in opposition to the pretensions of Jordan and the Papal Curia, which had refused confirmation of Roger's archiepiscopal candidate for Salerno. The move backfired and Desiderius, under pressure from Jordan to accept, was elected pope as Victor III. With the aid of armies from Jordan and the Countess Matilda of Tuscany, Victor took the Vatican Hill from Clement on 1 July 1086. The pope remained lukewarm to his new job until Jordan suggested that only through decisive action could the good fortune of his beloved abbey of Montecassino be sustained. This led to an important synod at Benevento (1087), where Clement was excommunicated, lay investiture outlawed, and war with the Saracens of Africa declared.

The remainder of Jordan's career was not notable and he died in November 1090 or 1091 in Piperna (near Terracina) and was buried in the monastery he had long supported, Montecassino, leaving a young son named Richard who succeeded him.

== Family ==
Jordan married Gaitelgrima, daughter of Prince Guaimar IV of Salerno and sister of Sikelgaita, wife of Duke Robert Guiscard. Together they had:

- Richard,
- Robert,
- Jordan,
- one daughter, whose name is unknown.

== Notes ==
Preceded by Richard I	Count of Aversa; 1078–1091	Succeeded by Richard II
Preceded by Richard I	Prince of Capua; 1078–1091	Succeeded by Richard II
