= Siege of the Castle of Saint George =

1500 battle of the Second Ottoman-Venetian War

Coordinates: 38.2000°N 20.5000°E

Siege of the Castle of St. George
- Part of the Ottoman–Venetian War (1499–1503)
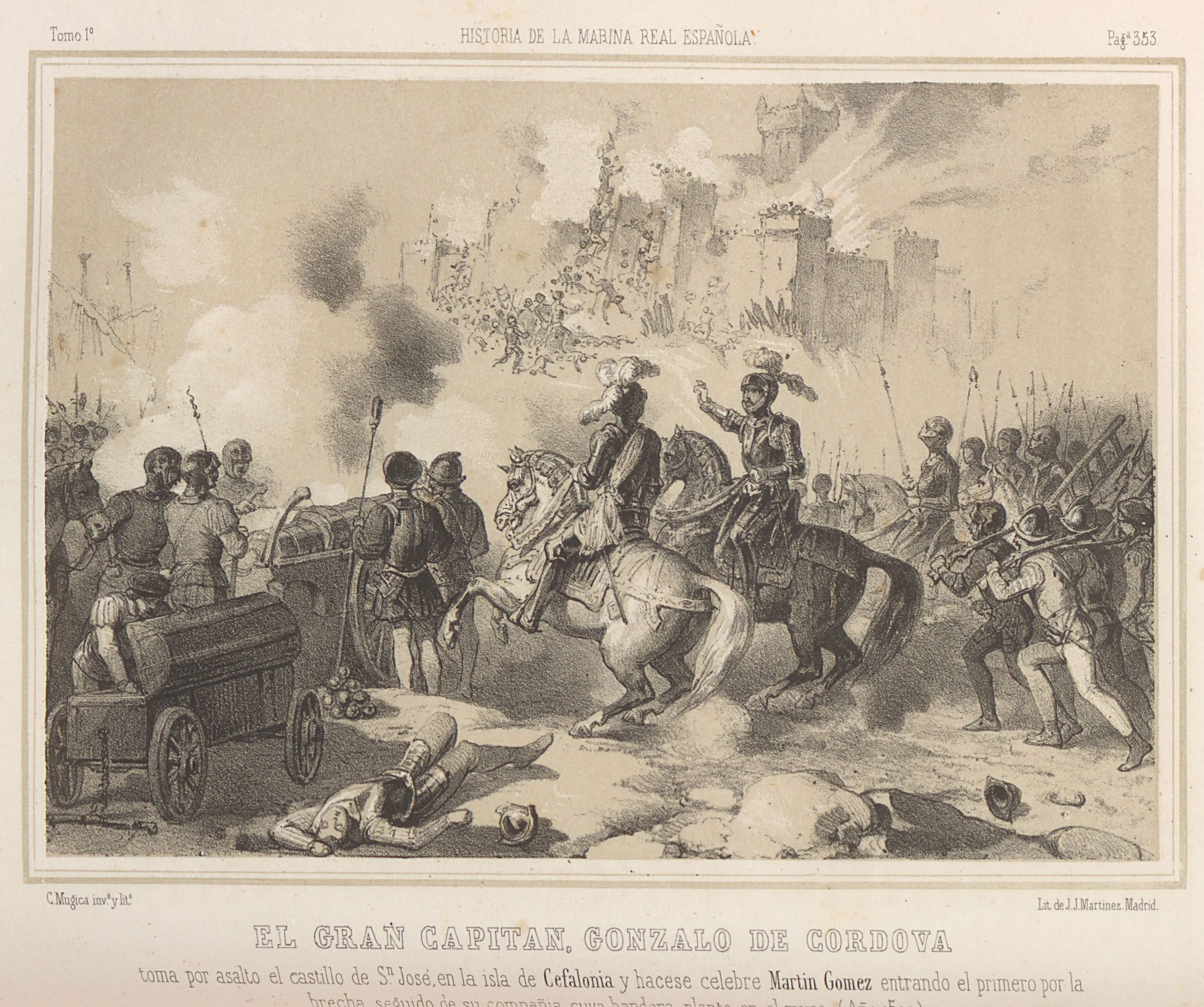
- 19th-century depiction of Gonzalo de Córdoba directing the assault against the castle
Date	8 November – 24 December 1500
Location	Castle of Saint George, Cephalonia
Result	Spanish–Venetian victory

Belligerents
Spain; Republic of Venice	Ottoman Empire

Commanders and leaders
Gonzalo Fernández de Córdoba; Benedetto Pesaro	Gisdar Aga †; Kemal Reis; Feriz Beg

The siege of the Castle of Saint George, also known as the siege of Cephalonia, occurred from 8 November until 24 December 1500, when following a series of Venetian disasters at the hands of the Turks, the Spanish-Venetian army under Captain Gonzalo Fernández de Córdoba and Benedetto Pesaro succeeded in capturing the Ottoman stronghold of Cephalonia.

== Background ==
Cephalonia, one of the Ionian Islands off the western coast of Greece, had been in the hands of the Italian counts palatine of the Tocco family until 1479, when it was captured by the Ottoman Empire during the First Ottoman–Venetian War. With the exception of a brief period of Venetian control in 1482–83, the island remained in Ottoman hands until 1500.

The Second Ottoman–Venetian War broke out in 1499 with the Ottoman attack on the Venetian port of Lepanto on the Greek mainland, which surrendered on 24 August 1499. The war continued to go badly for Venice, as the Ottomans shifted their attention to the Morea and stormed Modon on 9 August 1500, followed by the subsequent surrender of the neighbouring forts of Coron and Navarino.

== Siege ==
On 17 August 1500, however, the Spanish captain-general, Gonzalo Fernández de Córdoba, offered the forces at his disposal to the aid of Venice. Aided by the Spanish fleet, the newly appointed Venetian captain-general of the Sea, Benedetto Pesaro, landed on Cephalonia and after a siege took the island's capital, the Castle of St. George, on 24 December. The Spanish commander and his fleet returned to Sicily after that, but Pesaro went on to recover Santa Maura (Lefkada) as well in August 1502.

== Aftermath ==
When a peace treaty was concluded in Constantinople in December 1502, Cephalonia remained in Venetian hands, but Lefkada was returned to Ottoman rule in 1503.
