= Castle of Saint George, Cephalonia =

Fort in Argostoli Municipality, Greece

Coordinates: 38°08′19″N 20°33′09″E

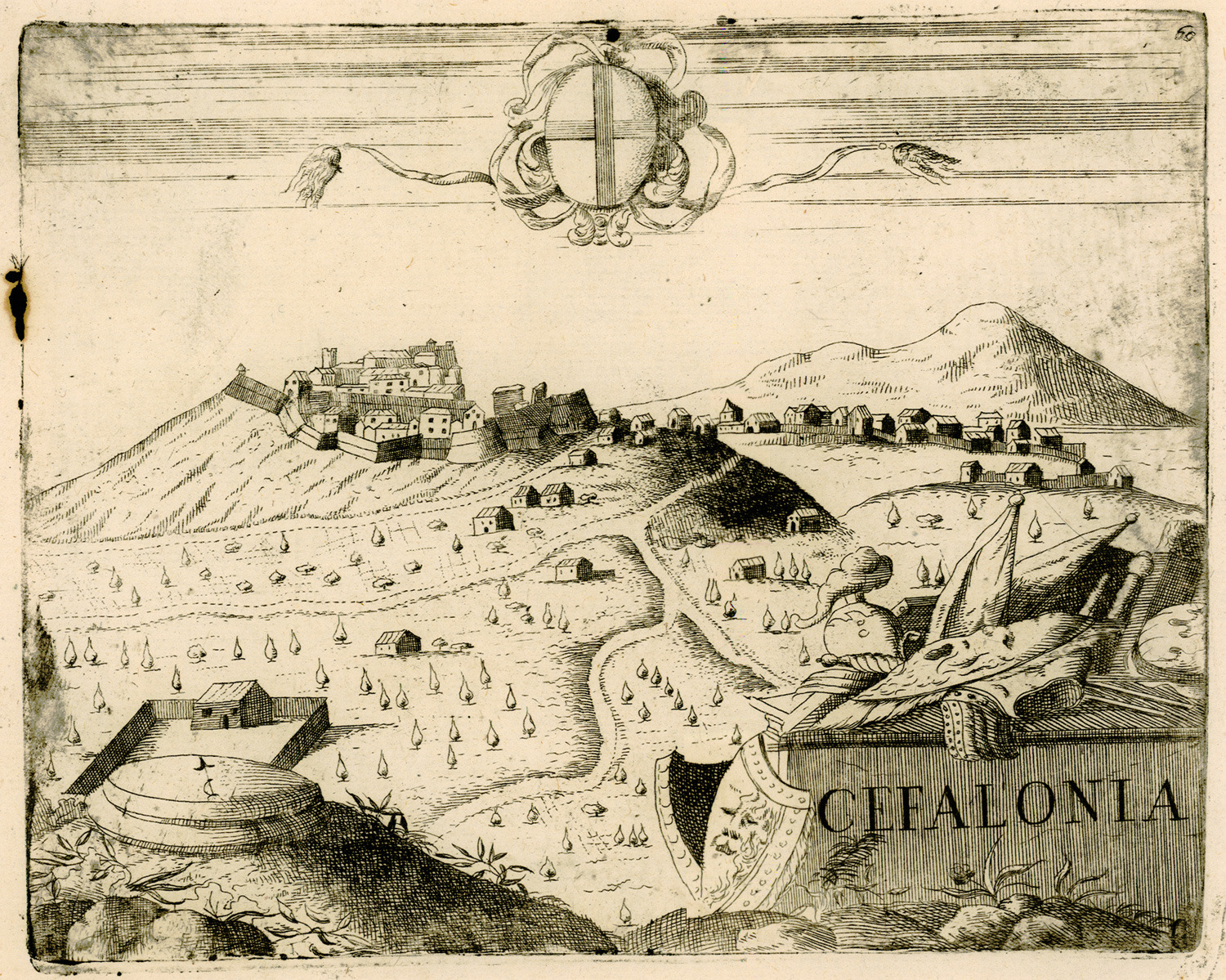
View of the castle and its settlement in the late 17th century, by Vincenzo Coronelli

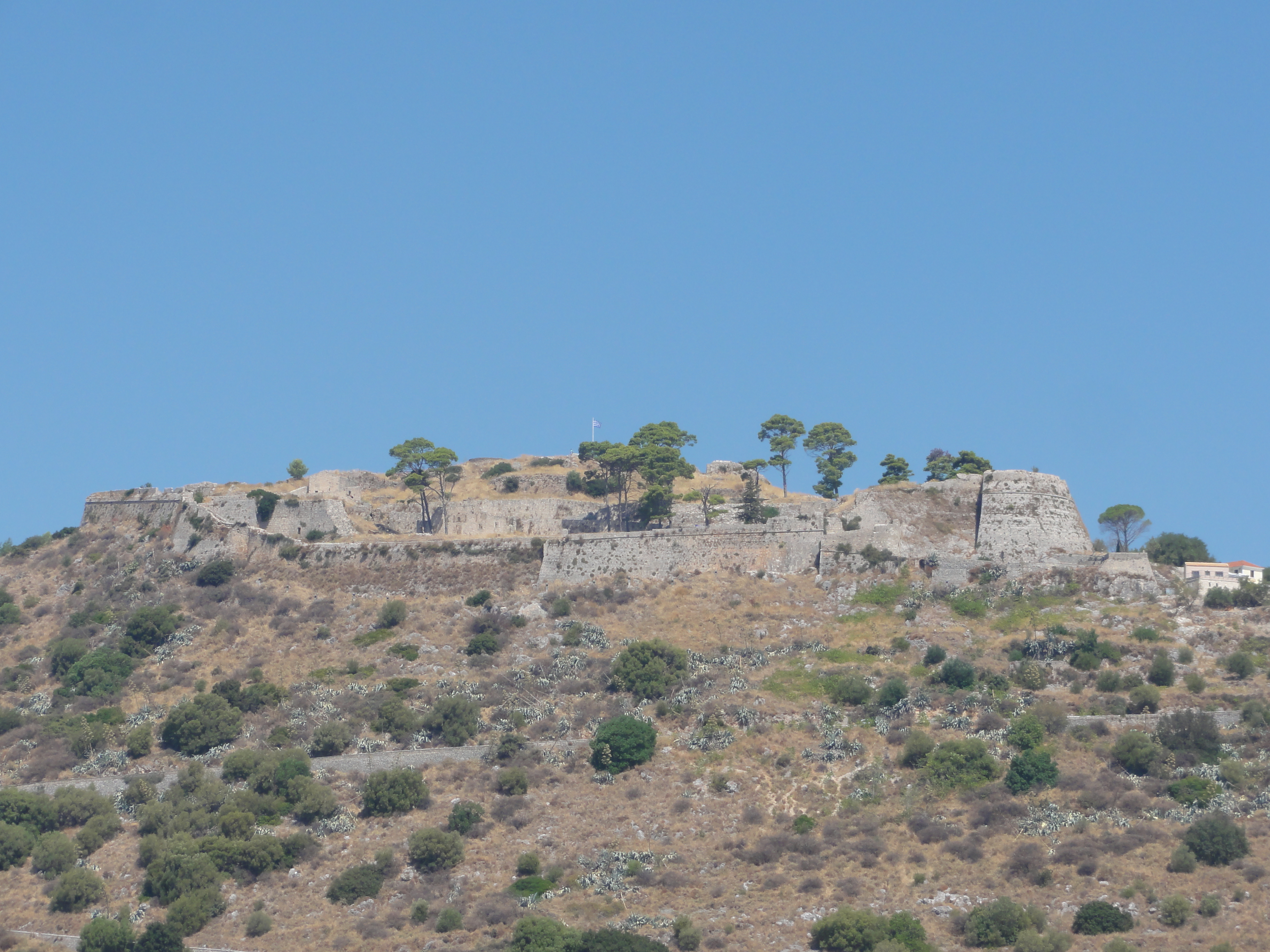
The remains of the castle today

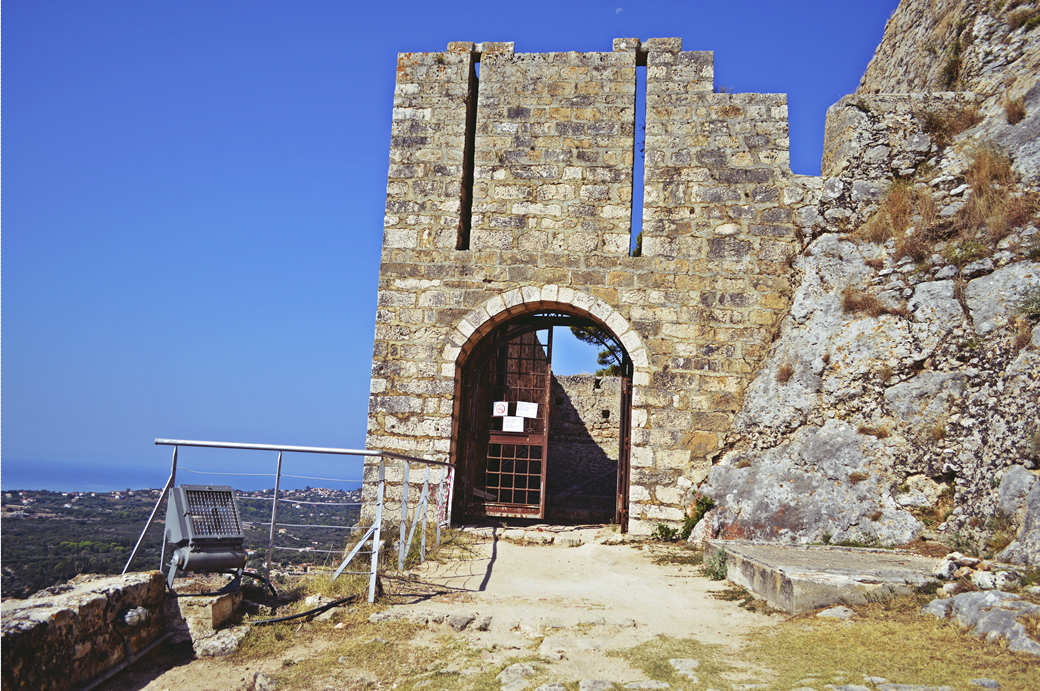
The castle gate

The Castle of Saint George (Greek: Κάστρο Αγίου Γεωργίου), Castle of Cephalonia (Κάστρο Κεφαλληνίας), or simply Kastro (Κάστρο, lit. 'fortress') was a fortified settlement that was the main town of the island of Cephalonia, Greece, from the Middle Ages until the 18th century. The site is currently located near Peratata.

== Location ==
The castle is located on a 320 metres (1,050 ft) tall limsestone hill in southwestern Cephalonia, just east of the modern village of Kastro and about 7 kilometres (4.3 mi) southeast of the modern capital of the island, Argostoli. The site is of strategic importance, dominating the southwestern parts of the island with the fertile valley of Livatho, as well as the Bay of Livadi, the island's main anchorage.

== History ==
The castle is first attested in 1085, when it was unsuccessfully besieged by the Italo-Normans under Roger Borsa, during the invasion of the Byzantine Empire. The Normans suffered heavy losses due to malaria and even Roger's father, Robert Guiscard, died on the island during this time. In 1099 a raid by a Pisan fleet under Dagobert of Pisa, on its way to the Holy Land, is also recorded, but the castle was able to withstand their attacks. In 1125 or 1126, the castle was captured by a Venetian fleet, an event which forced Emperor John II Komnenos to reconfirm the privileges that had been granted to the Venetians in 1082. The Venetians also took away the relics of Donatus of Euroea, which were deposed in the church of Santa Maria e San Donato in Murano. The Muslim geographer al-Idrisi visited the island and the castle town in the middle of the 12th century, and described both as flourishing.

The castle was named after Saint George, apparently due to a small church inside the original Byzantine castle, but is given the name for the first time in a document of 1264, and again in 1325, when John of Gravina campaigned on the island to claim possession of the county palatine of Cephalonia and Zakynthos. During the later 14th and early 15th century, the castle is attested as a residence of the Tocco family, rulers of the county palatine and of the Despotate of Epirus in the mainland. Under the Tocco, the castle was rebuilt and extended, to serve its new purpose as the seat of a feudal court. The castle and its settlement suffered heavy damage during an earthquake in 1469.

In August 1479, the Ottomans captured the island, besieged the fortress and killed most of the garrison, and carried off its inhabitants to resettle Constantinople. The fortress along with the island changed hands frequently thereafter, before coming again under Venetian rule in 1500.

The castle suffered extensive damage during the three-month siege that led to its capture by the Venetians in 1500. As a result, from 1504 until 1594 it was rebuilt on a larger scale with three bastions added outside the main, 600 metres (2,000 ft) long enceinte. Under Venetian rule, a settlement grew inside the fortifications, as well as outside, in the so-called borgo, which today is the village of Kastro. In a census of 1583, the castle and settlement are recorded as having 859 inhabitants. The settlement was gradually abandoned after 1757, when the Venetians moved the administrative seat of the island to Argostoli, and the site suffered further damage in World War II and in the 1953 Ionian earthquake.

== Condition ==
A small part of the walls of the original Byzantine fortress survives. The Venetian-era enceinte with its single gate and the three bastions survive in good condition today, as do the chapel of the garrison, dedicated to the Virgin Mary, the Roman Catholic church of Saint Mark and the Greek Orthodox church of Saint Nicholas, the residence of the Venetian provveditore (governor), barracks, cisterns, storage rooms and gunpowder stores.

== Sources ==
- Fokas-Kosmetatos, Nikolaos (1966). Το Κάστρο Αγίου Γεωργίου Κεφαλληνίας (in Greek). Athens.
- Moschonas, N. G. (10 December 1995). "Το «κάστρο του Αγίου Γεωργίου»". Επτά Ημέρες (in Greek). Athens: Kathimerini: 7–8.
- Soustal, Peter; Koder, Johannes (1981). Tabula Imperii Byzantini, Band 3: Nikopolis und Kephallēnia (in German). Vienna: Verlag der Österreichischen Akademie der Wissenschaften. ISBN 978-3-7001-0399-8.
