= Jordan of Ariano =

Jordan (died 12 August 1127), count of Ariano (from 1102), was the ruler of the county of Ariano in the eastern Campania during the reign of the Duke William II. He was the son and successor of Count Herbert and Altrude of Buonalbergo.

== Biography ==
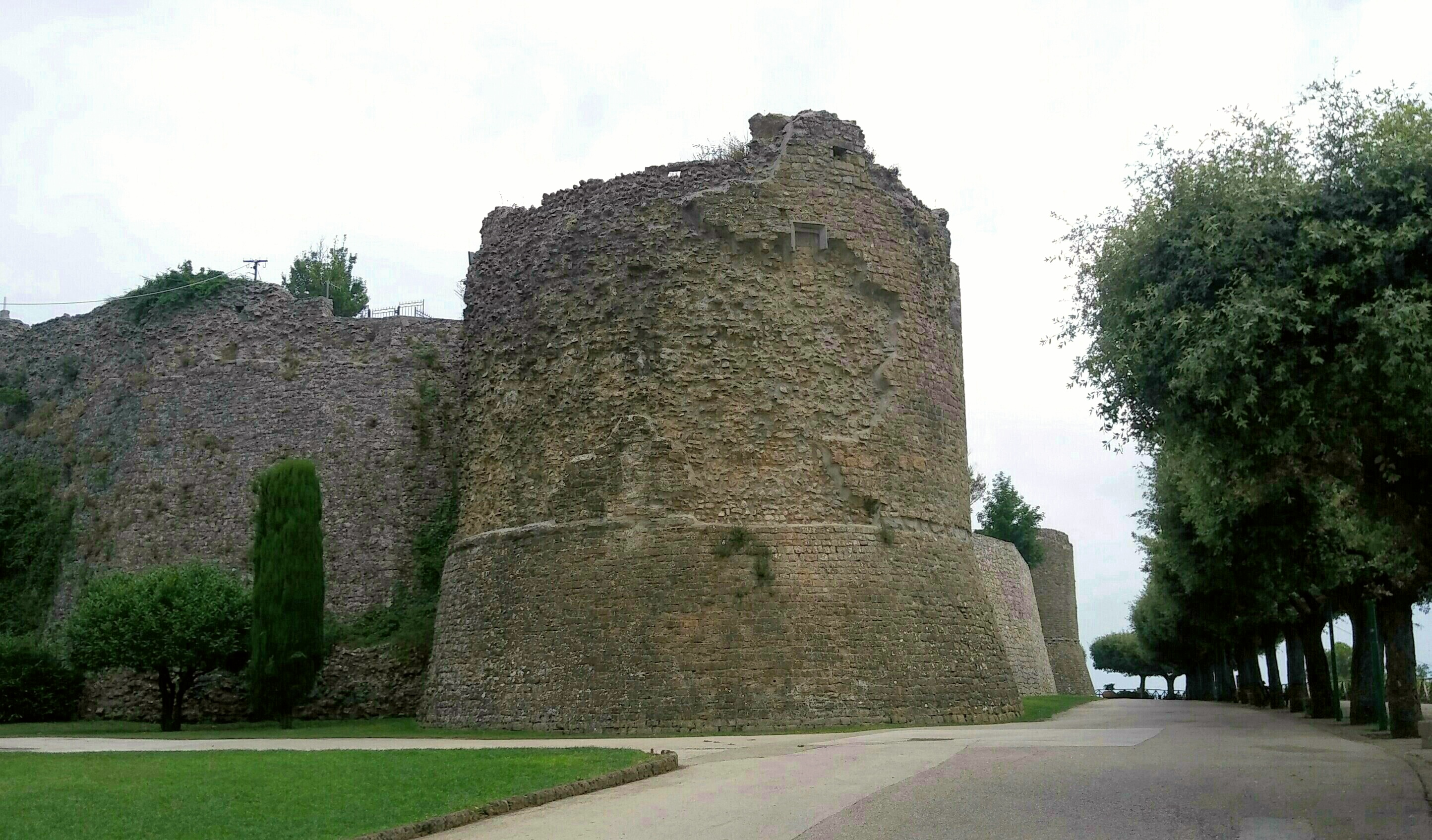
The ruins of Ariano Castle

In 1113–4, Jordan and Robert I of Capua waged war against Benevento, but the Archbishop Landulf II made peace with them.

He rebelled against Duke William and, at Nusco in 1121, he took a troop of knights to threaten and insult the duke, saying, according to Falco of Benevento, "I will cut your coat short for you," before plundering the district. William begged assistance from his more powerful relative Roger II of Sicily, who, in exchange for Calabria and the duke's halves of Palermo and Messina, sent a corps of knights and a sum of gold, which assisted Duke William in seizing most of the county of Ariano. When Jordan died, his young son was put under the suzerainty of his neighbour, Count Ranulf of Alife.

== Sources ==
- Norwich, John Julius. The Normans in the South, 1016–1130. London, 1967.
- Caravale, Mario (ed). Dizionario Biografico degli Italiani. Rome, 2003.
