= Landulf II (archbishop of Benevento) =

Landulf II (died 4 August 1119) was the Archbishop of Benevento from 8 November 1108 to his death. He succeeded Roffredo more than a year after the latter's death on 9 September 1107. The main source for his eventful reign is the contemporary chronicler and fellow Lombard and Benventan Falco.

Landulf was a son of Gaideris, probably of local origin. Landulf was the cardinal-priest of San Lorenzo in Lucina when he was elected archbishop. He was consecrated to his office by Pope Paschal II himself during a synod in Benevento lasting from October to November 1108. He was a reformer and he directed his energies towards restructuring his ancient diocese, which corresponded roughly to the Principality of Benevento, which was technically papal property. In 1112, he played an essential rôle in the selection of rector for the territory.

Despite these characteristics, Landulf was a supporter of the popular party and the Normans and opponent of the pro-papal aristocracy, led by the papal constable Landulf of Greca. A great many feudi (vassals) of the archdiocese were Normans. Discord, however, reached such a level between the two Landulfs that the constable was forced to flee to Montefusco and the archbishop went to Rome in 1114 to seek mediation. The pope responded by sending a Romuald, cardinal-deacon of Santa Maria in Via Lata, and Peter, cardinal-bishop of Porto, to arbitrate between the disputants. Landulf, moreover, had made peace with Robert I of Capua and Jordan of Ariano, who had attacked the city. The pope accused Landulf of exceeding his authority by making truces without papal permission. Romuald found the archbishop to blame for the conflict with Greca and the pope deposed him from his see at the Council of Ceprano in October that year. An eyewitness account of this is probably found in Falco.

The Abbey of Montecassino intervened on Landulf's behalf with the pope and, on 11 August 1116, he was reappointed. On 10 March 1118, he was in Gaeta to greet Pope Gelasius II in his exile. On 10 March 1119, he convoked a local synod to put an end to the ongoing violence. Attended by many cardinals and bishops, the council provided little help to the situation.

Landulf was a promoter of local hagiography and cults. He also built a new episcopal cathedral and translated the bodies of the saints kept at the old one there on 15 May. He died 4 August 1119, leaving us some sermons, hagiographies, and a passion.

== Sources ==
- Caravale, Mario (ed). Dizionario Biografico degli Italiani: LXIII Labroca – Laterza. Rome, 2004.
- Houben, Hubert (translated by Graham A. Loud and Diane Milburn). Roger II of Sicily: Ruler between East and West. Cambridge University Press, 2002.
