= Richard III of Capua =

11th/12th-century Italian nobleman

Richard III (born c. 1110 – died 10 June 1120) was count of Aversa and prince of Capua briefly in 1120 from his anointing on 27 May until his death; he was the only son and heir of Robert I of Capua. He was an infant when his father died, and he fell under the regency of his uncle, Jordan. Richard III died within a few months and, though no contemporary chronicler blames him, some modern historians have cast doubt on Jordan's innocence. Jordan did succeed unopposed to the diminished Capuan throne.

Preceded by Robert I	Count of Aversa; 1120	Succeeded by Jordan II
Preceded by Robert I	Prince of Capua; 1120	Succeeded by Jordan II
