= Robert I of Capua =

Robert I (born c. 1080 – died 1120), was count of Aversa and prince of Capua from 1106, on the death of his elder and heirless brother Richard II of Capua. Robert was the second eldest son of Jordan I of Capua and Gaitelgrima, daughter of Guaimar IV of Salerno.

He tried to be the papal protector as his father and grandfather had been and sent three hundred knights to rescue Pope Paschal II and his sixteen cardinals during their imprisonment by Emperor Henry V in 1111. However, his troops were turned back by the count of Tusculum, Ptolemy I, and never made it to their goal.

In 1114, he and Jordan of Ariano assaulted the papal principality of Benevento, but the Archbishop Landulf II made peace with them.

In 1117, Paschal II fled to him and he hosted Paschal's successor, Gelasius II, later in 1118, even escorting him back to Rome with his army.

Though he did not acknowledge the Apulian suzerainty which his brother had been forced to accept, he was nonetheless a petty secondary power in the Mezzogiorno. He died in 1120, leaving a son and successor in the infant Richard III. A daughter of his, whose name has been lost, was married to King Stephen II of Hungary in the same year.

Preceded by Richard II	Prince of Capua; Count of Aversa; 1106–1120	Succeeded by Richard III
