= Gaitelgrima of Salerno =

Gaitelgrima of Salerno (fl. 1091), was princess consort of Capua by marriage to Jordan I of Capua. She was regent of Capua in 1091 during the minority of her sons, Richard, Robert, and Jordan.

== Life ==
Gaitelgrima was the daughter of Guaimar IV of Salerno and Gemma, and was the sister of Gisulf II of Salerno and Sichelgaita.

She was first married to Richard Aversa. After his death she married his son Jordan I of Capua. Pope Gregory VII claimed that Gaitelgrima was forced into the marriage, with Jordan I of Capita literally dragging the unwilling woman to be married.

After being widowed by Jordan in 1091, she took up the regency of her sons, Richard, Robert, and Jordan. Later the same year, however, she was expelled from Capua by the citizens, who elected one Count Lando as their prince, and she took her sons with her to Aversa.

In Sarno, she sheltered her brother Gisulf in his final days and there he is buried. She remarried to Alfred, Count of Sarno, and it was to Sarno that she retired eventually.
