= Lando IV of Capua =

Lombard prince of Capua (1091–1098)

Lando IV (Italian: Landone) was the Lombard prince of Capua from December 1091 until 19 June 1098, in opposition to Norman prince Richard II. Lando belonged to the family of the counts of Teano. The Catalogus Principum Capuae claims that Richard was "for years expelled by the Lombard counts and was made prince of Aversa [only], and afterwards he again held Capua", without naming any of the Lombard counts. A charter from 27 January 1093 shows that for a time Richard II held Capua, but lost it again and was not finally reinstated until he successfully besieged it in 1098.
