= Captain General of the Sea =

Wartime commander-in-chief of the Venetian navy

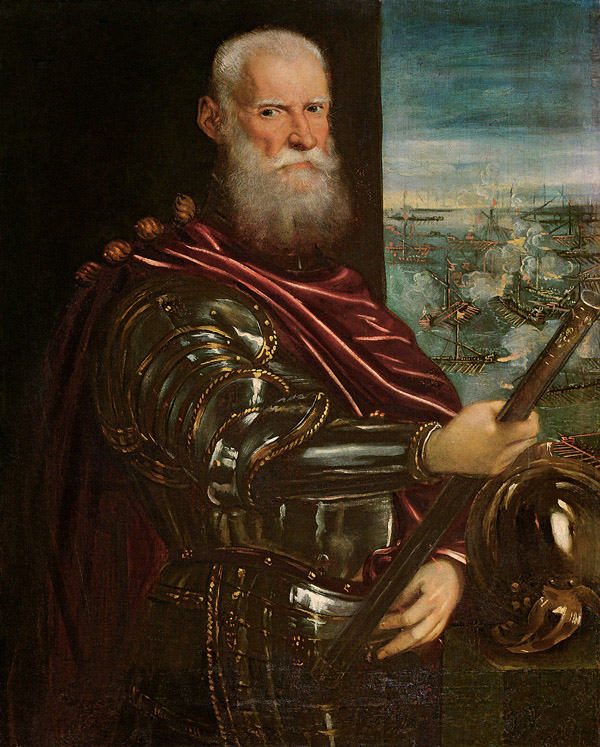
Captain General of the Sea Sebastiano Venier at the Battle of Lepanto, painting by Tintoretto

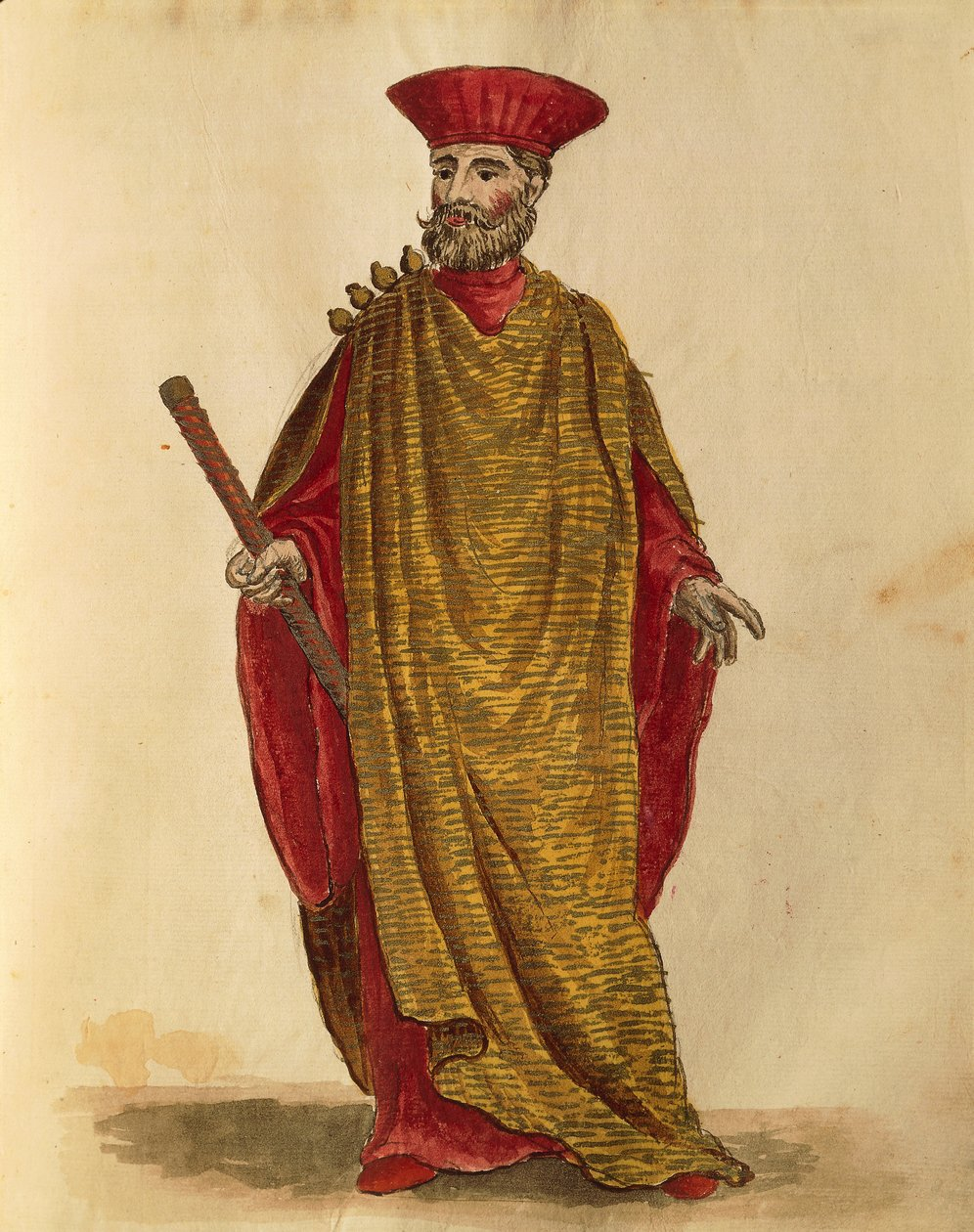
A Captain General of the Sea in ceremonial robes, by Jan van Grevenbroeck

The Captain General of the Sea (Venetian: Capitano Generale da Mar) was the wartime commander-in-chief of the Venetian navy.

== History ==
The post of Captain General of the Sea was filled only during wartime, by election by the Great Council of Venice, usually from one of the members of the Venetian patriciate with long experience in naval affairs, although occasionally younger or less militarily experienced men were selected. During the later 17th century, the considerable expenses that the office entailed made the wealth of the candidates an important factor in their selection.

Like all Venetian officials, the Captain General of the Sea was answerable to the councils composing the Venetian government (such as the Great Council or the Signoria) that set actual policy, but otherwise enjoyed comprehensive authority over all naval commanders and officials, as well as officials in the overseas colonies for matters pertaining to the fleet. When deciding on issues of strategy and tactics, however, he was constrained to obey the decisions of the war council, taken by majority vote. This was convened on the flagship and comprised all the commanding officers of squadrons (the Capi di Mare, signalled by the presence of a lantern on their vessels), the head of the commissariat, the commanders of any auxiliary or allied contingents, and, in case of landing operations, the commander of the troops carried on board the fleet.

On campaign, the Captain General hoisted his ensign on a bastard galley, which served as the fleet flagship (the galera generalizia or Capitana). Even after the other major European navies, the Venetian fleet, and even the Venetians' major naval rivals, the Ottoman Navy, began using mostly sail ships of the line during the 17th century, the tradition-minded Venetians insisted, despite heavy debate, to keep a galley as the Captain General's flagship. Only two exceptions to this are known, in 1617 and in 1715. From early 15th Century the crew of flagship was exclusively recruited from Zadar commune. The crew of the flagship enjoyed special privileges, and was exempted from the usual deductions of pay for the coverings of the rowing benches. They also received free of charge a red coat, red breeches, and a red cap. In combat the flagship took position in the centre of the Venetian formation.

In case of the Captain General's death he was replaced either by the Provveditore Generale da Mar, or the most senior Capo da Mar, until such time as a new Captain General could be elected by the fleet. If for whatever reason that election was likely to be delayed, the Provveditore Generale da Mar was appointed as acting Captain General.

== Notable holders ==
- Jacopo Dondulo, during the War of Saint Sabas
- Carlo Zeno, at the Battle of Modon (1403)
- Pietro Mocenigo, during the First Ottoman–Venetian War
- Antonio Grimani, during the Second Ottoman–Venetian War
- Benedetto Pesaro, during the Second Ottoman–Venetian War
- Giacomo Foscarini, during the Fourth Ottoman–Venetian War
- Girolamo Zane, during the early phase of the Fourth Ottoman–Venetian War
- Lazzaro Mocenigo, during the Fifth Ottoman–Venetian War
- Francesco Morosini, in 1654-1655, during the Fifth Ottoman–Venetian War (Cretan War), and then also at the beginning of the Sixth Ottoman–Venetian War (Morean War)
- Andrea Pisani, during the Seventh Ottoman–Venetian War
- Sebastiano Venier, during the Battle of Lepanto

== Sources ==
- Lane, Frederic Chapin (1973). Venice, A Maritime Republic. Baltimore, Maryland: Johns Hopkins University Press. ISBN 0-8018-1445-6.
- Nani Mocenigo, Mario (1935). Storia della marina veneziana: da Lepanto alla caduta della Repubblica [History of the Venetian navy: from Lepanto to the fall of the Republic] (in Italian). Rome: Tipo lit. Ministero della Marina - Uff. Gabinetto.
