= Benedetto Pesaro =

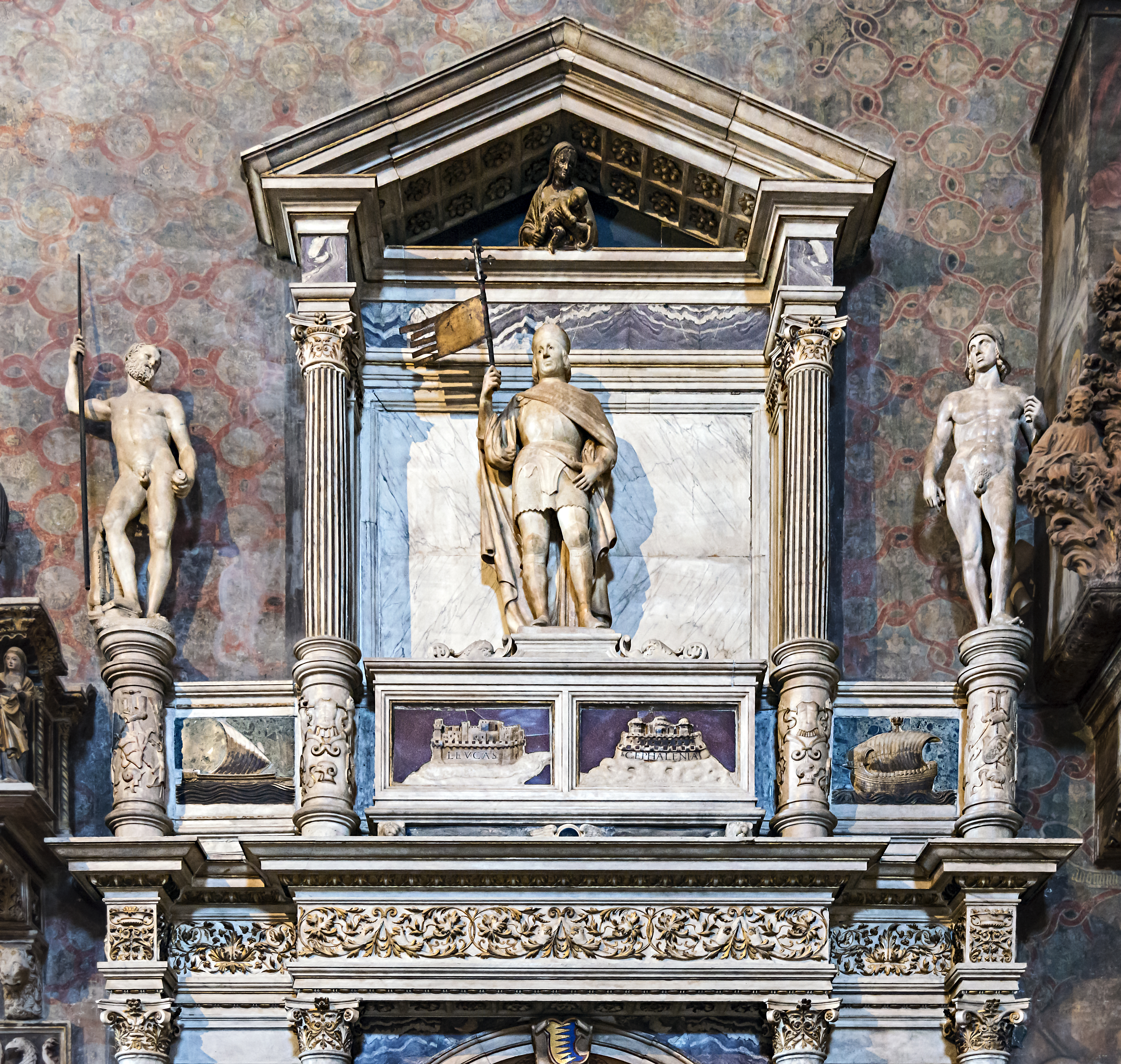
Monument to Benedetto Pesaro at the Frari, commemorating his victories at Cephalonia and Santa Maura.

Benedetto Pesaro (c. 1430 – August 1503) was a Venetian nobleman who served as commander-in-chief of the Venetian navy from 1500 to 1503. He is notable for his military successes during the Second Ottoman–Venetian War.

== Biography ==
He was elected to the post on 28 July 1500, shortly after the death of his predecessor Melchior Trevisan. A scion of the noble Pesaro family, he was about 70 at the time of his election, returning an approximate birthdate of 1430. Supposedly possessed of a voracious sexual appetite, the diarist Girolamo Priuli took unkindly to the fact that he still enjoyed the company of mistresses in old age.

His first victory came in late 1500 when, aided by a Spanish fleet under Gonzalo de Cordoba, he retook Cephalonia from the Ottomans. Later, in 1502, he met his cousin Jacopo Pesaro (who had thirteen papal galleys under his command) on the Greek island of Cerigo, and from there launched an assault on Turkish-controlled Santa Maura; the island fell on 30 August. However, when peace was agreed the next year, concessions were made; while Cephalonia was kept under Venetian control, Santa Maura was returned to the Turks.

Also worthy of note is Pesaro's ruthlessness in the field. In 1501, after capturing the notorious Turkish pirate Erichi, whose ship had run aground on Milos, he had him roasted to death. On another occasion, Pesaro ordered the beheading of Marco Loredan, a relative of Doge Leonardo Loredan, for his unseemly readiness to surrender his fort to the Turks.

He died in August 1503 at Corfu, having fallen ill as he was making preparations to return home. In his will he requested that he be interred in the Santa Maria Gloriosa dei Frari. His funerary monument, which stands there today, was constructed by the brothers Lorenzo and Giambattista Bregno.

== Sources ==
- Thubron, Colin (1981). The Venetians. London: Time Life UK.
- Setton, Kenneth M. (1978). The Papacy and the Levant (1204–1571), Volume II: The Fifteenth Century. Philadelphia: The American Philosophical Society. ISBN 0-87169-127-2.
- Crowley, Roger (2012). City of Fortune: How Venice Won and Lost a Naval Empire. Faber & Faber.
- Bembo, Pietro. History of Venice, Books 5–8. Translated by Robert W. Ulery Jr. Cambridge, Mass.: Harvard University Press, 2008.
