= Richard II of Capua =

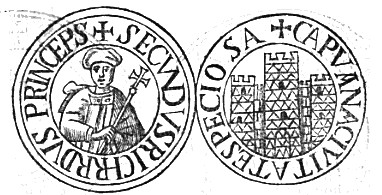
Richard 2 Capua

Richard II (c. 1078 – 1105 or 1106), called the Bald, was the count of Aversa and the prince of Capua from 1090 or 1091. He was under the guardianship of Count Robert of Caiazzo until he came of age in 1093.

== Life ==
The eldest son and successor of Jordan I of Capua and Gaitelgrima, daughter of Prince Guaimar IV of Salerno, he was named after his grandfather, Richard I of Capua. Capua, although in the 11th century was in the midst of Norman conquest, intermarriage was not uncommon. Richard's grandmother, Fressenda d'Hauteville, daughter of Tancred of Hauteville and Fressenda, was Norman. She, along with other Norman women in the late 11th century went to Italy to get married. Also in Richard's Lineage was that of his great-uncle Roger I and Norman wife Judith. While digressing on this impressive lineage, the chronicler William of Apulia in his The Deeds of Robert Guiscard says that he "though now only a young man, already shows courage worthy of an adult."

He succeeded to his father's dominions at a very young age and immediately he and his family were thrown out of their city by the capricious Capuans. The counts of Aquino rose in rebellion and attacked Soria, defended by Richard's uncle, Jonathan, Count of Carinola.

Richard was an exile for the next seven years (during which a Lombard named Lando IV reigned) until, upon reaching his majority, he requested the aid of his great-uncle, the count of Sicily, Roger I, and his first cousin once removed, the duke of Apulia, Roger Borsa. The two Rogers came, the former in exchange for the city of Naples and the latter for Richard's recognition of Apulian suzerainty, in May 1098, and besieged Capua for forty days.

It was an interesting siege, for Pope Urban II, embroiled in a controversy with Count Roger, came down to discuss the legatine power in Sicily with him, and Anselm of Aosta, the archbishop of Canterbury in self-exile from King William II of England, came to meet the pope. With the aid of Sicilian Saracens, the city fell, and the prince was reinstated, Apulian suzerainty acknowledged, and the pope and the count withdrew to Salerno. When he died, in 1105 or 1106, he left no heir and was succeeded by his younger brother Robert. Though he had accepted doing homage to the Hauteville duke of Apulia, his successors did not, and Capua returned to de facto independence under them. Richard's confessor was Bishop Bernard of Carinola.

== Importance Gap in the Historiography ==
In both Norman and Capua historiography, Richard’s reign is often glossed over. Oftentimes, there are only brief mentions of his reign as prince of Capua. Richard’s reign is only a few sentences compared to the books of his more researched peers. Richard existed in and left his mark in the 11th-12th century, which had some significant Medieval Italian-Norman figures. Including his brothers, Robert, who Richard was succeeded by, and Jordan, who would also later become prince of Capua. Although, the Capua that they would rule would look different than Richard’s Capua. It is also during this time that Roger I and his son Roger II would heavily involve themselves in Medieval Southern-Italian politics. Roger II, in particular, is often referred to by historians like Hubert Houben as controversial. Even among his contemporaries. The Rogers were extremely influential in Sicily, and their influence between Germany and Southern Italy. This was felt through their ability to secure land and castles in both cities and rural towns. Compared to these well-documented figures, Richard is glossed over in the historiography, he is just a branch in the family in the tree. But it is due to his branch, that the Norman influence of Capua will allow Capua to further establish itself in Southern Italy and be home to future influential Kings and Princes.

== Sources ==
- William of Apulia, The Deeds of Robert Guiscard Books One (pdf)
- Norwich, John Julius. The Normans in the South 1016-1130. Longmans: London, 1967.

Preceded by Jordan I	Count of Aversa; 1091–1106	Succeeded by Robert I
Preceded by Jordan I	Prince of Capua; 1091–1106	Succeeded by Robert I
