= Romuald (cardinal) =

12th-century Italian cardinal

Romuald (Italian: Romualdo) (died 1 April 1136) was the cardinal-deacon of Santa Maria in Via Lata from about 1109, and the Archbishop of Salerno (as Romuald I) from 1121 until his death.

In the capacity of a cardinal, he served Pope Paschal II as a diplomat. Together with Pietro Senex, cardinal-bishop of Porto, he mediated between Landulf II, Archbishop of Benevento, and Landulf of Greca, the papal constable of the Duchy of Benevento, in 1114. Romuald found the archbishop to blame for the conflict, and the pope deposed him from his see at the Council of Ceprano in October that year. An eyewitness account of the proceedings against Landulf is found in Falco of Benevento.

He was consecrated archbishop of Salerno on 15 September 1121 by Pope Callixtus II; at the same time, he resigned his title of cardinal. During the papal schism of 1130–38 he supported antipope Anacletus II.

== Sources ==
- "Landolfo II." Dizionario Biografico degli Italiani, LXIII. Rome: 2004.
- Houben, Hubert. 2002. Roger II of Sicily: Ruler between East and West. Translated by Graham A. Loud and Diane Milburn. Cambridge: Cambridge University Press.
- Hüls, Rudolf. 1977. Kardinäle, Klerus und Kirchen Roms: 1049–1130. Tübingen.
- Miranda, Salvador. "GUARNA, Romualdo (?-1136)". The Cardinals of the Holy Roman Church. Florida International University Libraries. OCLC 53276621.
