= Roger Borsa =

Duke of Apulia and Calabria from 1085 to 1111

Count of Apulia and Calabria
- Reign: 1085 – 1111
- Predecessor: Robert Guiscard
- Successor: William II
- Born: c. 1061
- Died: 22 February 1111

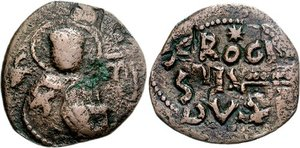
A follaro of Roger Borsa's, minted at Salerno

Roger Borsa (c. 1061 – 22 February 1111) was the Norman Duke of Apulia and Calabria and effective ruler of southern Italy from 1085 until his death.

== Life ==
=== Early life ===
Roger was the son of Robert Guiscard and Sikelgaita, a Lombard noblewoman. His ambitious mother arranged for Roger to succeed his father in place of Robert Guiscard's eldest son by another wife, Bohemond of Taranto. His nickname, Borsa, which means "purse", came from "his early-ingrained habit of counting and recounting his money."

In 1073, Sikelgaita had Roger proclaimed heir after Guiscard fell ill at Trani. Roger's cousin Abelard was the only baron to dissent from the election of Roger, claiming that he himself was the rightful heir to the duchy. Roger accompanied his father on a campaign to Greece in 1084. He was still in Greece when his father died on 17 July 1085 during the Castle of Saint George in Cephalonia. While Bohemond was supposed to inherit the Greek possessions and Roger the Italian ones, it was Bohemond who was in Italy (Salerno) and Roger in Greece (Bundicia) at the time of the Guiscard's passing.

=== Duke of Apulia and Calabria ===
Southern Italy in the year before Roger Borsa became Duke of Apulia and Calabria

Roger rejoined his mother in Cephalonia, his absence causing panic and confusion with his army, according to Goffredo Malaterra. The two quickly returned to the peninsula and with the support of his uncle Roger I of Sicily was recognised as duke in September. His Lombard heritage also made him a more attractive candidate than his Norman half-brother, who had fled to Capua. With the support of Jordan I of Capua, Bohemond rebelled against his brother and took Oria, Otranto, and Taranto. Roger, however, made peace in March 1086 and the brothers acted as effective co-rulers. In late summer 1087, Bohemond renewed the war with the support of some of his brother's vassals. He surprised and defeated Roger at Fragneto and retook Taranto. Though described as a powerful warrior (he took the cities of Benevento, Canosa, Capua, and Lucera by siege), Roger Borsa was never able to check Bohemond's power or bring him under his control. The war was finally resolved by the mediation of Pope Urban II and the award of Taranto and other possessions to Bohemond. Roger also granted him the vassalage of Geoffrey of Conversano, thus giving Bohemond control over Brindisi, as well as Cosenza and other holdings he desired allodially. In September 1089 Roger Borsa was officially invested with the Duchy of Apulia by Pope Urban II at the Synod of Melfi.

Roger permitted the minting of baronial coinage in at least two instances (Fulco of Basacers and Manso vicedux). He planned to urbanise the Mezzogiorno by granting charters to various towns and encouraging urban planning. In 1090, he and Urban tried unsuccessfully to convince Bruno of Cologne, founder of the Carthusian Order, to accept election to the archbishopric of Reggio di Calabria.

In May 1098, at the request of his first cousin once removed Prince Richard II of Capua, Borsa and his uncle Count Roger I of Sicily began the siege of Capua, from which the prince had long ago been exiled as a minor. In exchange for his assistance, the duke received the homage of Richard, though he seems to have made no use of it, for Richard's successors paid no heed to Roger Borsa's overlordship. Capua fell after forty days of notable besieging, for Pope Urban II had come to meet Roger of Sicily and Archbishop Anselm of Canterbury had come to meet the pope.

In October 1104, Roger besieged William, Count of Monte Sant'Angelo, who was at that time independent and pledged to the Byzantines, and expelled him from the Gargano, abolishing the county. He died 22 February 1111, at the age of 50, and was buried in the cathedral of Salerno.

== Marriage and children ==
In 1092, Roger Borsa married Adela, the daughter of Robert I, Count of Flanders, and widow of Canute IV of Denmark. Their children were:

- Louis, who died young in August 1094
- William
- Guiscard, who died young in August 1108.

By a mistress, Roger had at least one other son, William of Gesualdo.

== Literature ==
- Albu, Emily (2001). The Normans in Their Histories: Propaganda, Myth and Subversion. The Boydell Press.
- Chibnall, Marjorie (2000). Piety, Power and History in Medieval England and Normandy. Ashgate.
- Kleinhenz, Christopher, ed. (2004). Routledge Revivals: Medieval Italy: An Encyclopedia. Vol. II. Routledge.
- Hailstone, Paula Z. (6 Dec 2019). Recalcitrant Crusaders?: The Relationship Between Southern Italy and Sicily, Crusading and the Crusader States, c. 1060–1198. Routledge. ISBN 9781000764628.
- Loud, G. A. (20 December 2007). The Latin Church in Norman Italy. Cambridge University Press. ISBN 978-1-107-32000-0.
- Mosher, Paul Hostetler (1969). The Abbey of Cava in the Eleventh and Twelfth Centuries: Cava, the Normans and the Greeks in Southern Italy. University of California Press.
- van Houts, Elisabeth (2016). "Changes of Aristocratic Identity: Remarriage and Remembrance in Europe, 900-1200". In Brenner, Elma; Cohen, Meredith; Franklin-Brown, Mary (eds.). Memory and Commemoration in Medieval Culture. Routledge.

Italian royalty
| Preceded by Robert Guiscard | Duke of Apulia and Calabria; 1085–1111 | Succeeded by William II |
