= Ferdinand Chalandon =

French medievalist and Byzantinist (1875–1921)

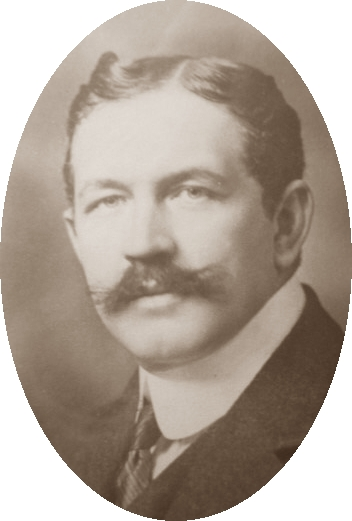
- Born: 10 February 1875; Lyon, France
- Died: 31 October 1921 (aged 46); Lausanne, Switzerland)
- Occupations: Medievalist; Byzantinist
- Years active: 1900–1921

Ferdinand Chalandon (10 February 1875 in Lyon – 31 October 1921 in Lausanne) was a French medievalist and Byzantinist.

Having begun his education in his hometown of Lyon, Chalandon moved to Paris and graduated from the Lycée Louis-le-Grand. With a degree in history he was admitted in 1895 into the École des Chartes, where he obtained his diplôme des hautes études in 1897 and the archivist's and paleographer's qualification in 1899. His first work on Alexios I Komnenos was presented as a thesis to the École des Chartes in 1900.

He subsequently spent two years in Italy with the École française de Rome, travelling widely, in particular across the South where he transcribed documents from monastic and capitular archives. This resulted in his two-volume study of the Norman conquest of the Mezzogiorno and the Norman kingdom of Sicily which won him the Grand prix Gobert in 1909. Unsurpassed in scope, it remains a landmark of scholarship on this period and was reprinted in the 1960s.

While his long-term project was to write a complete history of the Byzantine Empire from the time of Justinian and a history of the Crusades, Chalandon next laid the foundations for the study of the Eastern Roman empire in the twelfth century. Building on his study of Alexios Komnenos, in 1912 he published a lengthy monograph on his successors, John II and Manuel I. Also in 1912, Chalandon travelled via Constantinople to Syria, Palestine and Egypt. His interest in the Middle East led to a collaboration with Gustave Schlumberger on Sigillographie de l'Orient latin, a project which Chalandon took over and brought to near completion by the time of his premature death in 1921 from health problems contracted during World War I. He had been researching two other volumes which never saw publication: Le Moyen Age chrétien et musulman du Ve au XIIIe siècle and Mahomet, les Arabes, les Huns. His history of the First Crusade was prepared from his notes by his wife, who also worked extensively on the Sigillographie before its final revision by Adrien Blanchet.

== Publications ==
- Essai sur le règne d'Alexis Ier Comnène (1081-1118), Paris: A. Picard, 1900
- La diplomatique des Normands de Sicile et de l'Italie méridionale, Mélanges d'archéologie et d'histoire 20.1 (1900), pp. 155–197
- Histoire de la domination normande en Italie et en Sicile, Paris: A. Picard, 1907 (vol. I & vol. II)
- Jean II Comnène (1118-1143) et Manuel I Comnène (1143-1180), Paris: A. Picard, 1912 (vol. I & vol. II)
- Histoire de la première croisade jusqu'à l'élection de Godefroi de Bouillon, Paris: Floch, 1925
- (with Gustave Schlumberger and Adrien Blanchet) Sigillographie de l'Orient latin, Paris: Paul Geuthner, 1943
