= Logothete =

Byzantine administrative title

Logothete (Greek: λογοθέτης, logothétēs, pl. λογοθέται, logothétai; Med. Latin: logotheta, pl. logothetae; Bulgarian: логотет; Italian: logoteta; Romanian: logofăt; Serbian: логотет, logotet) was an administrative title originating in the eastern Roman Empire. In the middle and late Byzantine Empire, it rose to become a senior administrative title, equivalent to a minister or secretary of state. The title spread to other states influenced by Byzantine culture, such as Bulgaria, Sicily, Serbia, and the Danubian Principalities.

== Byzantine Empire ==
=== Origin and development ===
In Greek, logothetēs means "one who accounts, calculates or ratiocinates", literally "one who sets the word". The exact origin of the title is unclear; it is found in papyri and works of the Church Fathers denoting a variety of junior officials, mostly charged with fiscal duties. The ancestors of the middle Byzantine logothetes were the fiscal officials known as rationales during Late Antiquity. The office dates back to at least the time of Emperor Septimius Severus (r. 193–211), where a procurator a rationibus is attested. In late Roman times, the rationales were officials attached to the praetorian prefectures and charged with supervising the state treasury and the emperor's private domains. The first notable official titled as a logothete was Marinus, the future praetorian prefect and chief minister of Emperor Anastasius I (r. 491–518). In the 6th century, under Emperor Justinian I (r. 527–565), the logothetes gained in prominence and power, as they were placed in charge of the emperor's revenue-gathering measures and dispatched as fiscal agents to the provinces or accompanied military expeditions. They were allowed to keep a twelfth of the sums they would gather for the treasury, and some, such as the notorious Alexander "Scissors", amassed considerable fortunes in this way.

The major transformation of the office came in the early 7th century: during the Heraclian dynasty, the administrative machinery of the state, inherited from the time of Diocletian and Constantine the Great, was thoroughly reformed. Thus the three chief financial "departments" of the old system, the Praetorian Prefecture, the Sacred Largesses (sacrae largitiones) and the Private Domains (res privata) were replaced by smaller specialized departments titled logothesia (sing. logothesion) or sekreta (sing. sekreton). This process was the result of severe territorial loss and the need to rationalize revenue collection during the final Byzantine–Sasanian War of 602–628 and the early Muslim conquests, but had already been presaged by Emperor Justinian's reforms in the 6th century, when the res privata, responsible for the managing of imperial estates, had been divided by kind into five separate departments. By the mid-7th century, the sacrae largitiones too disappeared altogether, while its various sections, as those of the praetorian prefecture, were separated and set up as autonomous departments, some of them headed by a logothete. These were under the supervision of the sakellarios, who functioned as a "general comptroller of finances", and ultimately of the emperor himself.

The first mention of a logothete in a senior position was the "most glorious logothete and patrician" Theodosios in 626, possibly either in charge of the genikon or the stratiōtikon. Although the first concrete evidence for the existence of many of the subsequent offices is often of a much later date, the chief departments, the genikon, the (e)idikon, the stratiōtikon and the dromos were in place by the late 7th century. There were also logothetes in the church, assisting the patriarch and the metropolitan bishops, while a logothetēs tou praitoriou was a senior official under the Eparch of Constantinople.

Under Emperor Alexios I Komnenos (r. 1081–1118), the logothete of the bureaux (logothetēs tōn sekretōn) was instituted, who supervised all state departments, evolving eventually into the Grand Logothete (megas logothetēs) of the late Byzantine Empire. By the Palaiologan period, the various logothetes had vanished or were converted into purely honorary titles.

=== Logothetes ===
- The logothetēs tou dromou (λογοθέτης τοῦ δρόμου), in English usually rendered as Logothete of the Course/Drome/Dromos or Postal Logothete, responsible for the imperial post, diplomacy and intelligence. In the 10th–11th centuries, its holder often functioned as the Byzantine Empire's chief minister.
- The logothetēs tou genikou (λογοθέτης τοῦ γενικοῦ), often called genikos logothetēs or simply ho genikos (ὁ γενικός), and usually rendered in English as the General Logothete. He was in charge of the "general financial ministry", the genikon logothesion, responsible for general taxation and revenue.
- The logothetēs tou stratiōtikou (λογοθέτης τοῦ στρατιωτικοῦ), the Logothete of the Military [Fisc], was in charge of the pay and provisioning of the Byzantine army, although his exact duties are somewhat obscure.
- The logothetēs tōn agelōn (λογοθέτης τῶν ἀγελῶν), in English the Logothete of the Herds, was responsible for the state-run estates (mētata) in western Asia Minor that reared horses and mules for the army and the imperial Public Post.
- The epi tou eidikou or simply the eidikos ("the one responsible for the Special Affairs Department"): responsible for the (e)idikon logothesion, which supervised the imperial treasury, factories, storehouses, and monopolies. According to some scholars, an evolution of the Roman comes rerum privatarum.
- The logothetēs tou praitōriou (λογοθέτης τοῦ πραιτωρίου) or Logothete of the Praetorium, one of the two principal aides of the Eparch of Constantinople, probably charged with judicial and policing duties.
- The logothetēs tōn hydatōn (λογοθέτης τῶν ὑδάτων), the "logothete of the waters", an obscure official who is mentioned only once. Possibly to be identified with the komēs hydatōn ("Count of the Waters"), an official in charge of the aqueducts.
- The logothetēs tōn oikeiakōn (λογοθέτης τῶν οἰκιακῶν), in charge of the oikeiakoi ("of the household") class of palace officials, and carrying out a variety of fiscal and judicial duties.
- The megas logothetēs (μέγας λογοθέτης) or "Grand Logothete", originally established as the logothetēs tōn sekretōn (λογοθέτης τῶν σεκρέτων) by Alexios I Komnenos to supervise and coordinate the other government departments (sekreta).

== Logothetes outside Byzantium ==
=== Serbia ===
The title logotet (Serbian Cyrillic: логотет) was used in Serbia in the Middle Ages since the rule of King Stefan Milutin (r. 1282–1321). Notable title-holders include Rajko, Joanikije, Pribac, Gojko, Voihna, Pahomije and Stefan Ratković.

=== Sicily ===
Holy Roman Emperor Otto III (r. 996–1002), the son of the Byzantine princess Theophanu, bestowed it on his chancellor, Leo of Vercelli (999–1026). In the end, it only became firmly established in Sicily, where the logothete occupied the position of chancellor elsewhere, his office being equal if not superior to that of the Magnus Cancellarius. Thus, the title was borne for example by Pietro della Vigna, the all-powerful minister of Holy Roman Emperor Frederick II (r. 1220–1250), king of Sicily.

=== Romanian principalities ===
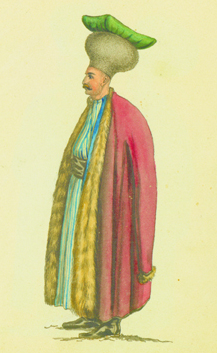
A Wallachian Logothete, 1827.

The title was also borrowed in the internal organization of the medieval Romanian countries, Moldavia and Wallachia. In Moldavia, the Great Logothete (mare logofăt) was the chief minister of the prince and head of the chancellery, while in Wallachia, he was the second-most senior member of the prince's council, after the ban.

Several other officials were also called logothetes:

- Second Logothete (logofăt al doilea), deputy of the Great Logothete.
- Third Logothete (logofăt al treilea), secretary of the Great Logothete.
- Logothete of the Treasury (logofăt de vistierie).
- Logothete of the Chamber (logofăt de cămară).
- Logothete of the Ceremonies (logofăt de obiceiuri)
- Logothete of the Secrets (logofăt de taină) or Royal Logothete (Logofăt domnesc), private secretary of the prince.

=== Modern era ===
Former U.S. President Theodore Roosevelt accused then-President Woodrow Wilson of being a "Byzantine logothete." The epithet insinuated that, like pencil-pushing Byzantine logothetes, or administrators, Wilson was dillydallying by not declaring America's participation in World War I.

== See also ==
- Byzantine bureaucracy and aristocracy
- Chancellor
- Lord Chancellor
- Vestiarion

== Sources ==
- Bury, John Bagnell (1911). The Imperial Administrative System of the Ninth Century - With a Revised Text of the Kletorologion of Philotheos. London: Oxford University Press.
- Evans, James Allan Stewart (1996). The Age of Justinian: The Circumstances of Imperial Power. New York: Routledge. ISBN 0-415-02209-6.
- Guilland, Rodolphe (1971). "Les Logothètes: Etudes sur l'histoire administrative de l'Empire byzantin" [The Logothetes: Studies on the Administrative History of the Byzantine Empire]. Revue des études byzantines (in French). 29: 5–115. doi:10.3406/rebyz.1971.1441.
- Haldon, John F. (1997). Byzantium in the Seventh Century: The Transformation of a Culture. Cambridge: Cambridge University Press. ISBN 978-0-521-31917-1.
- Haldon, John (1999). Warfare, State and Society in the Byzantine World, 565–1204. London: UCL Press. ISBN 1-85728-495-X.
- Haldon, John F. (2009). "The State - 1. Structures and Administration". In Jeffreys, Elizabeth; Haldon, John; Cormack, Robin (eds.). The Oxford Handbook of Byzantine Studies. Oxford: Oxford University Press. ISBN 978-0-19-925246-6.
- Kazhdan, Alexander, ed. (1991). The Oxford Dictionary of Byzantium. Oxford and New York: Oxford University Press. ISBN 0-19-504652-8.
- Laiou, Angeliki E., ed. (2002). The Economic History of Byzantium from the Seventh through the Fifteenth Century. Washington, DC: Dumbarton Oaks. ISBN 0-88402-288-9. Archived from the original on 2011-01-01.
- Magdalino, Paul (2002) [1993]. The Empire of Manuel I Komnenos, 1143–1180. Cambridge: Cambridge University Press. ISBN 0-521-52653-1.
- Treadgold, Warren (1997). A History of the Byzantine State and Society. Stanford, California: Stanford University Press. ISBN 0-8047-2630-2.
