= Logothetes tou dromou =

Postmaster general

The logothetes tou dromou (Greek: λογοθέτης τοῦ δρόμου), in English usually rendered as Logothete of the Course/Drome/Dromos or Postal Logothete, was the head of the department of the Public Post (Latin: cursus publicus, Greek: δημόσιος δρόμος, romanized: demosios dromos, or simply ὁ δρόμος, ho dromos), and one of the most senior fiscal ministers (logothetes) of the Byzantine Empire.

== History and functions ==
The office of the logothetes tou dromou is explicitly attested for the first time in circa 762, but traces its origins to the officials supervising the Public Post in Late Antiquity. Until the late 4th century, the administration of the Roman Empire's Public Post was a responsibility of the praetorian prefectures. Due to the abuse of the Post and its privileges by the officials of the praetorian prefecture, in the late 4th century the oversight over the Post passed to the magister officiorum, while the day-to-day administration remained in the hands of the praetorian prefecture. As a result, an official known as the curiosus cursus publici, the inspector of the Public Post, is attested in the late 4th-century Notitia Dignitatum (Pars Orientalis, XI.50) as one of the principal aides of the magister officiorum. The twin administration of the Public Post by the praetorian prefects and the magister officiorum continued into the 6th century, and it was not until c. 680 that the Public Post is found fully under the supervision of the magister officiorum.

The office of the logothetes tou dromou does not appear in the surviving sources until the year 762, but must have come into existence earlier, as the once-wide ranging duties of the magister officiorum were gradually removed and the office itself practically abolished during the course of the 8th century. Among the various functions of the magister officiorum, the logothetes tou dromou assumed control not only the Public Post, but also of domestic security and the Empire's foreign affairs, handling collection of intelligence on foreign peoples, correspondence with foreign princes and the reception of ambassadors. Originally the office was simply one of the four senior fiscal ministers or logothetai, and the Kletorologion of 899 places the logothetes tou dromou 35th in the imperial hierarchy, after the logothetes tou genikou (33rd) and the logothetes tou stratiotikou (34th), but above the logothetes ton agelon (40th). It rose quickly in importance, however; according to the French scholar Rodolphe Guilland, the logothetes tou dromou came to exercise the functions of a modern interior, security and foreign minister, although his role in foreign affairs remained by far the most important. It is indicative of his pre-eminence that in the Byzantine sources of the 9th–10th centuries, when there is mention of "the logothetes" without further qualification, it usually refers to the logothetes tou dromou.

Consequently, the incumbent of the office often served as the Empire's chief minister, although this ultimately depended on the reigning emperor. The Byzantines never formalized such a position, nor was it attached to a particular office, rather it was granted ad hoc on the basis of each emperor's favour towards a particular courtier, irrespective of rank or office. As Guilland points out, the senior officials of the imperial household—the praipositoi, parakoimomenoi and protovestiarioi–had far more opportunity to attract imperial favour and consequently were more often chosen to fill the role of chief minister. Notable logothetai tou dromou who served as chief ministers include Staurakios under Empress Irene of Athens (r. 797–802), Theoktistos during the regency of Empress Theodora (842–856), Stylianos Zaoutzes in the early reign of Leo VI the Wise (r. 886–912), Leo Phokas the Younger during the rule of his brother Nikephoros II Phokas (r. 963–969), John under Constantine IX Monomachos (r. 1042–1055), and Nikephoritzes under Michael VII Doukas (r. 1071–1078).

The 10th-century De Ceremoniis of Constantine VII Porphyrogenitus (r. 913–920, 944–959) depicts the administrative and ceremonial roles of the logothetes tou dromou: he was received in audience every morning by the Emperor in the Chrysotriklinos, he presented the senior officials at award-giving ceremonies, and had a prominent part in the reception of foreign embassies, as well as the exhibition of captives. After the reforms of Emperor Alexios I Komnenos (r. 1081–1118), in c. 1108 the dromos ceased to exist as a department, but the logothetes remained, now responsible for official communications and for supervising foreigners resident in Constantinople. At the same time, the logothetes tou dromou lost his pre-eminence among the senior ministers to the logothetes ton sekreton, a post which later evolved to the megas logothetes.

== Subordinate officials ==
The subordinates of the logothetes tou dromou were:

- The protonotarios tou dromou (πρωτονοτάριος τοῦ δρόμου), his senior deputy.
- The chartoularioi tou [oxeos] dromou (χαρτουλάριοι τοῦ [ὀξέος] δρόμου), who were clerks with the rank of spatharios, combining the functions of the Roman curiosi per omnes provincias found in the Notitia Dignitatum and of the officials in charge of the scrinium barbarorum, the 'Bureau of Barbarians'.
- A number of episkeptetai (ἐπισκεπτῆται), officials in charge of the various imperial estates (episkepseis).
- Translators (ἑρμηνευταῖ, hermeneutai), also attested (as interpretes diversarum gentium) in the Notitia Dignitatum.
- The kourator tou apokrisiareiou (κουράτωρ του ἀποκρισιαρείου), in charge of the apokrisiarieion, a building in Constantinople that housed foreign envoys.
- Various inspectors, the diatrechontes (διατρέχοντες, the old Roman cursores) and messengers (μανδάτορες, mandatores).

== Sources ==
- Bury, J. B.; Philotheus (1911). The Imperial Administrative System of the Ninth Century (With a Revised Text of the Kletorologion of Philotheos). London: Oxford University Press.
- Guilland, Rodolphe (1971). "Les Logothètes: Etudes sur l'histoire administrative de l'Empire byzantin" [The Logothetes: Studies on the Administrative History of the Byzantine Empire]. Revue des études byzantines (in French). 29: 5–115. doi:10.3406/rebyz.1971.1441.
- Kazhdan, Alexander, ed. (1991). The Oxford Dictionary of Byzantium. Oxford and New York: Oxford University Press. ISBN 0-19-504652-8.
- Magdalino, Paul (2002) [1993]. The Empire of Manuel I Komnenos, 1143–1180 (Second ed.). Cambridge: Cambridge University Press. ISBN 9780521526531.
