= Manuel Bryennios =

Byzantine scholar

- Born: c. 1275
- Died: c. 1340
- Scientific career
- Fields: Astronomy; Mathematics; Music theory
- Workplaces: University of Constantinople
- Academic advisors: Maximus Planudes
- Notable students: Theodore Metochites

Manuel Bryennios or Bryennius (Greek: Μανουὴλ Βρυέννιος; c. 1275 – c. 1340) was a Byzantine scholar who flourished in Constantinople about 1300 teaching astronomy, mathematics and music theory.

His only surviving work is the Harmonika (Greek: Ἁρμονικά), which is a three-volume codification of Byzantine musical scholarship based on the classical Greek works of Ptolemy, Nicomachus, and the Neopythagorean authors on the numerological theory of music. One of Bryennios's students was Theodore Metochites, the grand logothete during the reign of Emperor Andronikos II Palaiologos (r. 1272–1328). Metochites studied astronomy under Bryennios.
