= Megas logothetes =

Official who served as foreign minister of the Byzantine Empire

- Appointer: Byzantine Emperor
- Precursor: logothetes ton sekreton
- First holder: Strategopoulos
- Final holder: George Sphrantzes (Byzantine Empire); George Amiroutzes (Empire of Trebizond)
- Abolished: 1453/1461

The megas logothetes (Greek: μέγας λογοθέτης, lit. 'Grand Logothete' (Note: Logothetes means "one who accounts, calculates or ratiocinates", literally "one who sets the word". Originally designating junior officials, mostly charged with fiscal duties, it became applied to the heads of the fiscal departments of the central government in the 7th century.)) was an official who served as effective foreign minister of the Byzantine Empire, in the period from c. 1250 to c. 1350, after which it continued as an honorific dignity. The office evolved from the Komnenian-era logothetes ton sekreton, and was established during the Empire of Nicaea. Its holders were frequently distinguished scholars, who played a prominent role in the civil and military affairs of their time; three of its holders also served in tandem as the head of the civil administration and effective prime minister (mesazon) of the Empire. The title was also used in the Empire of Trebizond. After the fall of Constantinople, it was adopted in the Danubian Principalities as an honorific title for laymen in the Ecumenical Patriarchate of Constantinople.

== History and functions ==
The post originated as the logothetes ton sekreton, established by Emperor Alexios I Komnenos (r. 1081–1118) in an attempt to improve the coordination of the various fiscal departments (sekreta). In the late 12th century, the logothetes ton sekreton had risen to a pre-eminent position among the civil administrators, and was increasingly called the megas logothetes to indicate this. The all-powerful logothetes ton sekreton Theodore Kastamonites, maternal uncle and de facto regent of the Empire during the early reign of Isaac II Angelos (r. 1185–1195, 1203–1204), was the first to be officially called megas logothetes in a chrysobull of 1192, although as a honorific rather than an actual new title.

The logothetes ton sekreton was not formally replaced by the designation megas logothetes until after 1204, in the Empire of Nicaea (1204–1261) and under the revived Byzantine Empire under the Palaiologos dynasty (1261–1453). As seen in the case of the first known megas logothetes, Strategopoulos, in c. 1217, the post apparently retained its previous role: Strategopoulos is mentioned as president of the imperial tribunal, apparently the same body attested in 1196 under the presidency of the logothetes ton sekreton.

By the middle of the 13th century, however, its functions had evolved to become completely different from his antecedent: the megas logothetes assumed the conduct of foreign affairs and headed the chancery involved with diplomatic correspondence, previously the purview of the logothetes tou dromou. The megas logothetes was thus unique among the logothetes in retaining both its exalted position and an active function during the early Palaiologan period: the Book of Offices of pseudo-Kodinos, one of the main sources for the late Byzantine court and administration, records the logothetes tou genikou, logothetes tou dromou, logothetes tou stratiotikou, and logothetes ton agelon as purely honorific titles without a function. Pseudo-Kodinos wrote shortly after the middle of the 14th century, but the situation he records is likely of even earlier date.

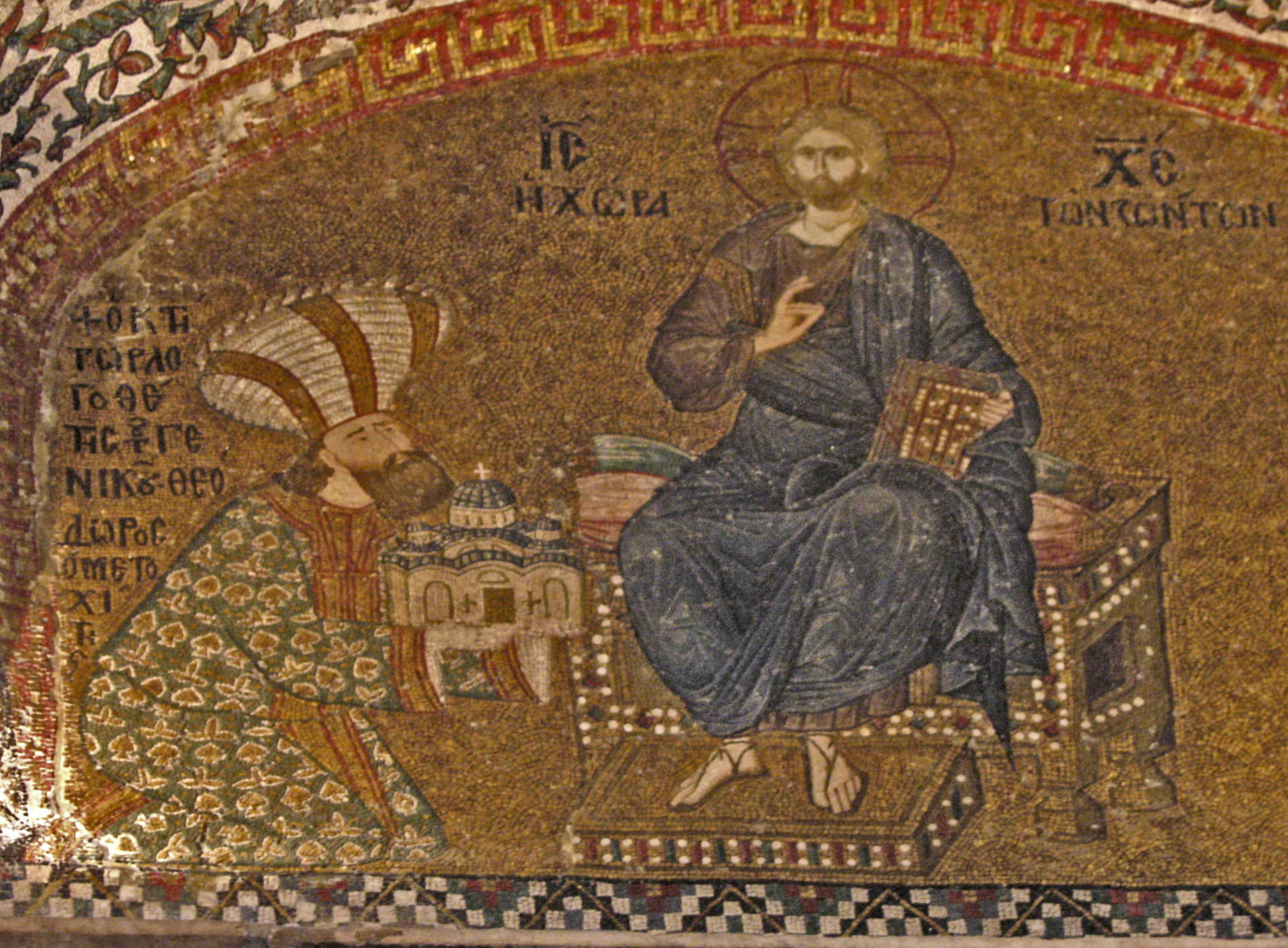
The megas logothetes Theodore Metochites (tenure 1321–1328) presenting the model of the renovated Chora Church to Christ Pantocrator

Since the publication of Charles Diehl's study on the logothetes ton sekreton in 1933, a generation of scholars considered the megas logothetes as the de facto chief minister of the Palaiologan-era Byzantine Empire. This view, however, has been proven as mistaken by later studies: numerous sources show that the position of chief minister during that time was designated by the title of mesazon, an office that supervised the imperial chancery and was in charge of state administration and justice. Indeed, Pseudo-Kodinos explicitly points out that the "proper function" of the megas logothetes was to supervise "the prostagmata and chrysoboulla sent by the emperor to all kings, sultans and toparchs", while the mesastikion (the function of a mesazon) "is carried out by whoever the emperor commands". Only three megaloi logothetai are known to have held the mesastikion—Theodore Mouzalon, Theodore Metochites, and John Gabalas—and indeed appear to have been appointed as mesazon before being promoted to megas logothetes, thereby demonstrating the distinct nature of the two titles. Already during pseudo-Kodinos's time, however, the purview of foreign affairs had been transferred to the mesazon, and the megas logothetes was thereafter reduced to a mostly honorific position; the early 15th-century writer Mazaris describes it as a 'prize' (γέρας) without particular attributes.

In his Untersuchungen zur spätbyzantinischen Verfassungs- und Wirtschaftsgeschichte, the German scholar Ernst Stein proposed that in the early 14th century, the megas logothetes also exercised the functions of the former Eparch of Constantinople in overseeing the administration of the imperial capital, until Andronikos III Palaiologos (r. 1328–1341), seeking to secure his throne after winning the civil war of 1321–1328, assigned them to the protostrator. Stein's assumption relies on reading the mesastikion in the passage of Pseudo-Kodinos as a compound denoting the Mese boulevard (which Stein considered as the centre of the capital's administration) and the rest of the city, rather than relating it with the office of mesazon; Stein's interpretation has been disproved by scholars such as Hans-Georg Beck and Léon-Pierre Raybaud.

Originally, the title ranked twelfth in the overall hierarchy of the palace, between the megas konostaulos and the protosebastos, but in March/April 1321 Emperor Andronikos II Palaiologos (r. 1282–1328), wishing to exalt his favourite Theodore Metochites, promoted him from logothetes tou genikou and raised the rank further to ninth place, above the megas stratopedarches and below the protostrator. It appears that the rank retained this high position for the remainder of the Byzantine Empire's existence.

According to pseudo-Kodinos, the insignia of office were a rich silk kabbadion (a kaftan-like tunic), a golden-red brimmed hat (skiadion) decorated with embroideries in the klapoton style, without veil, or a domed skaranikon hat, again in red and gold and decorated with golden wire, with a portrait of the emperor standing in front, and another of him enthroned in the rear. Unlike most officials of the court, he bore no staff of office (dikanikion).

Following the Fall of Constantinople in 1453, the title was used in the Danubian principalities of Moldavia and Wallachia. In the former, the Great Logothete (mare logofăt) was the chief minister of the prince and head of the chancellery, while in Wallachia, he was the second-most senior member of the prince's council, after the ban. To this day, the leading rank among the lay archons of the Ecumenical Patriarchate of Constantinople bears the title of "Grand Logothete".

== List of known megaloi logothetai ==
=== Empire of Nicaea and Palaiologan period ===
Name	Tenure	Appointed by	Notes	Refs
Strategopoulos	c. 1217	Theodore I Laskaris	The sebastos and megas logothetes Strategopoulos (first name unknown) is attested as presiding over a court decision in a dispute between two communities in the area of Miletus. The tribunal was obviously the same as that presided over by the logothetes ton sekreton in 1196, proving the evolutionary link between the two offices.	
George Akropolites	1255–1282	Theodore II Laskaris; Michael VIII Palaiologos	A scholar and historian, Akropolites enjoyed a rapid ascent in the imperial bureaucracy, rising to logothetes tou genikou by 1246. As a protégé of Theodore II Laskaris, he was promoted to megas logothetes in 1255. In that capacity he played a major role in political and military affairs, until his capture during a campaign against Michael II of Epirus in 1257. He was released in 1260. Following the reconquest of Constantinople in 1261, he asked Emperor Michael VIII Palaiologos to relieve him of his political functions so that he could dedicate himself to the revival of higher education in the imperial capital. Until his death in 1282, he served Michael VIII in a number of diplomatic missions.	
Theodore Mouzalon	1282–1294	Michael VIII Palaiologos; Andronikos II Palaiologos	A very well-educated man, Mouzalon was named megas logothetes after Akropolites' death, shortly before Michael VIII's own death. Mouzalon exercised great influence over the new emperor, Andronikos II. He not only served as the effective prime minister, but was even allowed to wear a gold-embroidered scarlet cap, similar to those borne by imperial princes. In 1291, Andronikos II elevated him to the rank of protovestiarios as well, and later married his son Constantine to Mouzalon's daughter. Following the onset of the illness that would lead to his death in March 1294, Mouzalon requested to be relieved of his administrative duties. On his advice, the emperor handed them over to Nikephoros Choumnos.	
Constantine Akropolites	c. 1305/06–1321	Andronikos II Palaiologos	Eldest son of George Akropolites and a scholar himself, he was named logothetes tou genikou by 1282, which he kept at least until c. 1294. The exact date of his appointment as megas logothetes is uncertain. The title was mostly honorific, as conduct of affairs remained in the hands of the mesazon Nikephoros Choumnos, and then Theodore Metochites.	
Theodore Metochites	1321–1328	Andronikos II Palaiologos	A noted scholar, Metochites successively advanced from logothetes ton agelon (1290) to logothetes ton oikeiakon (1295/96), logothetes tou genikou (1305), and finally megas logothetes in 1321, although he had replaced Nikephoros Choumnos as the de facto prime minister (mesazon) since 1305. Following the deposition of Andronikos II in the civil war of 1321–1328, Metochites was dismissed and exiled, ending his days as a monk.	
John Gabalas	1343–1344	John V Palaiologos	Originally a partisan of John VI Kantakouzenos, the megas droungarios John Gabalas defected to the regency for John V during the civil war of 1341–1347. He was promoted to protosebastos and eventually megas logothetes, before falling out with the head of the regency, Alexios Apokaukos, and being imprisoned.	
John Palaiologos Raoul	1344	John V Palaiologos	Uncle of John V, attested as megas logothetes in two acts concerning the monasteries of Zographou and Philotheou in October–November 1344. Guilland considers him identical to John Gabalas.	
Nikephoros Laskaris Metochites	c. 1355–1357	John VI Kantakouzenos; John V Palaiologos	Son of Theodore Metochites, partisan of Andronikos III Palaiologos during the civil war of 1321–1328, and of John Kantakouzenos during the civil war of 1341–1347. He is attested as megas logothetes in 1355–1357, but was evidently appointed by John VI and retained by John V after Kantakouzenos' resignation in 1354.	
George Sphrantzes	1451/52–1453	Constantine XI Palaiologos	After a succession of civil and diplomatic functions under Manuel II Palaiologos and Constantine XI Palaiologos, including as governor of Patras, Mystras, and Selymbria, Sphrantzes was appointed as the last megas logothetes of the Byzantine Empire. During the Fall of Constantinople he was taken captive, but was ransomed and continued to travel in the Balkans and Italy. He wrote a chronicle, the Chronicon Minus, based on his diary, covering the events of 1413–1477.	

=== Empire of Trebizond ===
Name	Tenure	Appointed by	Notes	Refs
George Scholarios	c. 1363	Alexios III Megas Komnenos	Attested in a treatise of George Gemistos Plethon.	
George Amiroutzes	c. 1458–1461	David Megas Komnenos	A noted philosopher and theologian, he served as the last prime minister of the Empire of Trebizond, with the titles of megas logothetes and protovestiarios. Considered pro-Turkish by contemporaries, he is accused of persuading Emperor David to surrender to the Ottomans during the Siege of Trebizond (1461). He spent the rest of his life as philosophy tutor of the Ottoman Sultan Mehmed II.	

== Sources ==
- Beck, Hans-Georg (1955). "Der byzantinische 'Ministerpräsident'" [The Byzantine 'Prime Minister']. Byzantinische Zeitschrift (in German). 48 (2): 309–338. doi:10.1515/byzs.1955.48.2.309. S2CID 191483710.
- Guilland, Rodolphe (1971). "Les Logothètes: Etudes sur l'histoire administrative de l'Empire byzantin" [The Logothetes: Studies on the Administrative History of the Byzantine Empire]. Revue des études byzantines (in French). 29: 5–115. doi:10.3406/rebyz.1971.1441.
- Kazhdan, Alexander, ed. (1991). The Oxford Dictionary of Byzantium. Oxford and New York: Oxford University Press. ISBN 0-19-504652-8.
- Loenertz, Raymond-Joseph (1960). "Le chancelier impérial à Byzance au XIVe et au XIIIe siècle" [The imperial chancellor in Byzantium in the 14th and 15th century]. Orientalia Christiana Periodica (in French). 26: 275–300.
- Oikonomidès, Nicolas (1985). "La chancellerie impériale de Byzance du 13e au 15e siècle" [The imperial chancery of Byzantium from the 13th to the 15th centuries]. Revue des études byzantines (in French). 43: 167–195. doi:10.3406/rebyz.1985.2171.
- Raybaud, Léon-Pierre (1968). Le gouvernement et l'administration centrale de l'empire byzantin sous les premiers Paléologues (1258-1354) [The government and central administration of the Byzantine Empire under the first Palaiologoi (1258-1354)] (in French). Éditions Sirey.
- Trapp, Erich; Beyer, Hans-Veit; Walther, Rainer; Sturm-Schnabl, Katja; Kislinger, Ewald; Leontiadis, Ioannis; Kaplaneres, Sokrates (1976–1996). Prosopographisches Lexikon der Palaiologenzeit (in German). Vienna: Verlag der Österreichischen Akademie der Wissenschaften. ISBN 3-7001-3003-1.
- Verpeaux, Jean (1955). "Contribution a l'étude de l'administration byzantine: ὁ μεσάζων" [Contribution to the study of Byzantine administration: ὁ μεσάζων]. Byzantinoslavica (in French). 16: 270–296.
- Verpeaux, Jean, ed. (1966). Pseudo-Kodinos, Traité des Offices (in French). Paris: Centre National de la Recherche Scientifique.
