= Bureau of Barbarians =

Government department in the Eastern Roman Empire

The Bureau of Barbarians (Latin: scrinium barbarorum, Greek: σκρίνιον τῶν βαρβάρων, skrinion tōn barbarōn) was a department of government in the Eastern Roman Empire. It is first recorded in the Notitia Dignitatum of the fifth century, where it came under the control of the magister officiorum ("Master of Offices"). The Notitia records that four secretaries (subadiuvae), either from the existing corps of the agentes in rebus or seconded from other bureaux, were appointed for each of the four major administrative divisions of the Eastern Empire: Asiana, Pontica, Oriens, and Thrace and Illyricum jointly. These handled matters of protocol and record keeping for any matters dealing with "Barbarians". They may also have played a role in translation services for visiting missions from Barbarian states. J.B. Bury believed that the office exercised supervision over all foreigners visiting Constantinople, and that they were under the supervision of the Logothete of the Course.

It has been asserted by some, such as author Michael Antonucci, that the Bureau of Barbarians acted as a sort of espionage office for the Empire. There is however no evidence that it was an espionage office, or even that it survived the reform of the "master of offices" position under Leo III, 717–741—though there is a lead seal bearing the name of a man, Peter, who was α'σπαθάριος καὶ ἐπί τῶν βαρβάρων ("protospatharios and in charge of the barbarians"), which is dated to the 9th century. The agentes in rebus within the postal system are noted elsewhere for maintaining a domestic intelligence gathering function in the Roman Empire into the 8th century, and hold a stronger claim to having been an imperial intelligence service than the Bureau of Barbarians. As its function seems to have dealt with the various barbarian nations with which the Empire had dealings, including translation, communication and correspondence, the Bureau of Barbarians would have had an intelligence function in the broadest modern sense, as distinct from espionage.

The Greek term barbarian, ancient in its origin, came to be used as a pejorative to refer to non-Greek-speaking peoples, i.e. foreigners. Its official use during the Roman era reflected the viewpoint that Roman civilization was the most advanced in mankind.
