= Byzantine Empire under the Palaiologos dynasty =

Period of Byzantine history from 1261 to 1453

Byzantine Empire: Βασιλεία Ῥωμαίων (Ancient Greek) Basileía Rhōmaíōn · Vasileía Romaíon; Imperium Romanum (Latin)
- 1261–1453
- Flag (c. 1350) Byzantine eagle
- Motto: Βασιλεὺς Βασιλέων, Βασιλεύων Βασιλευόντων; Basileus Basileōn, Basileuōn Basileuontōn (English: "King of Kings, Ruling Over Kings")
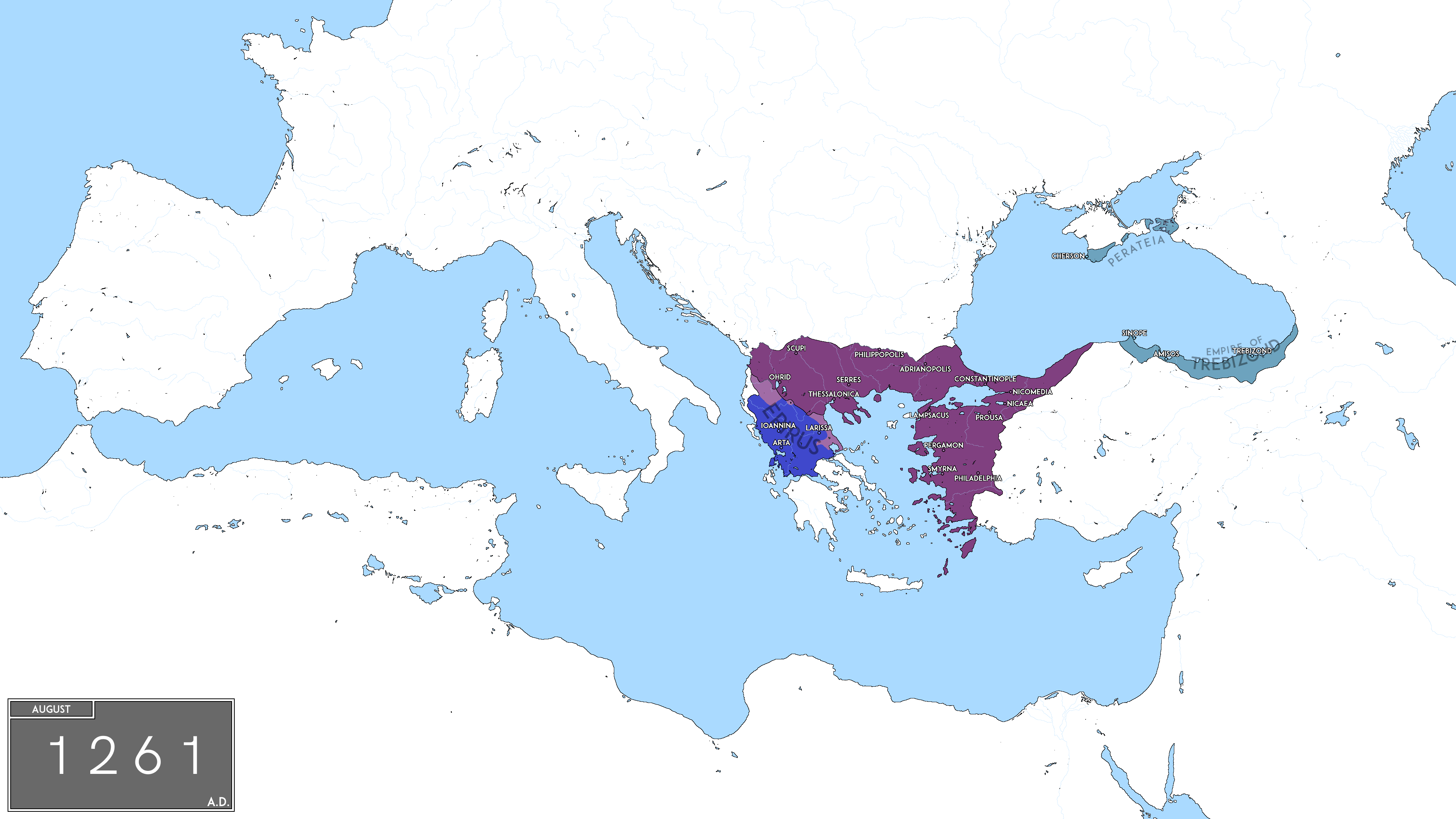
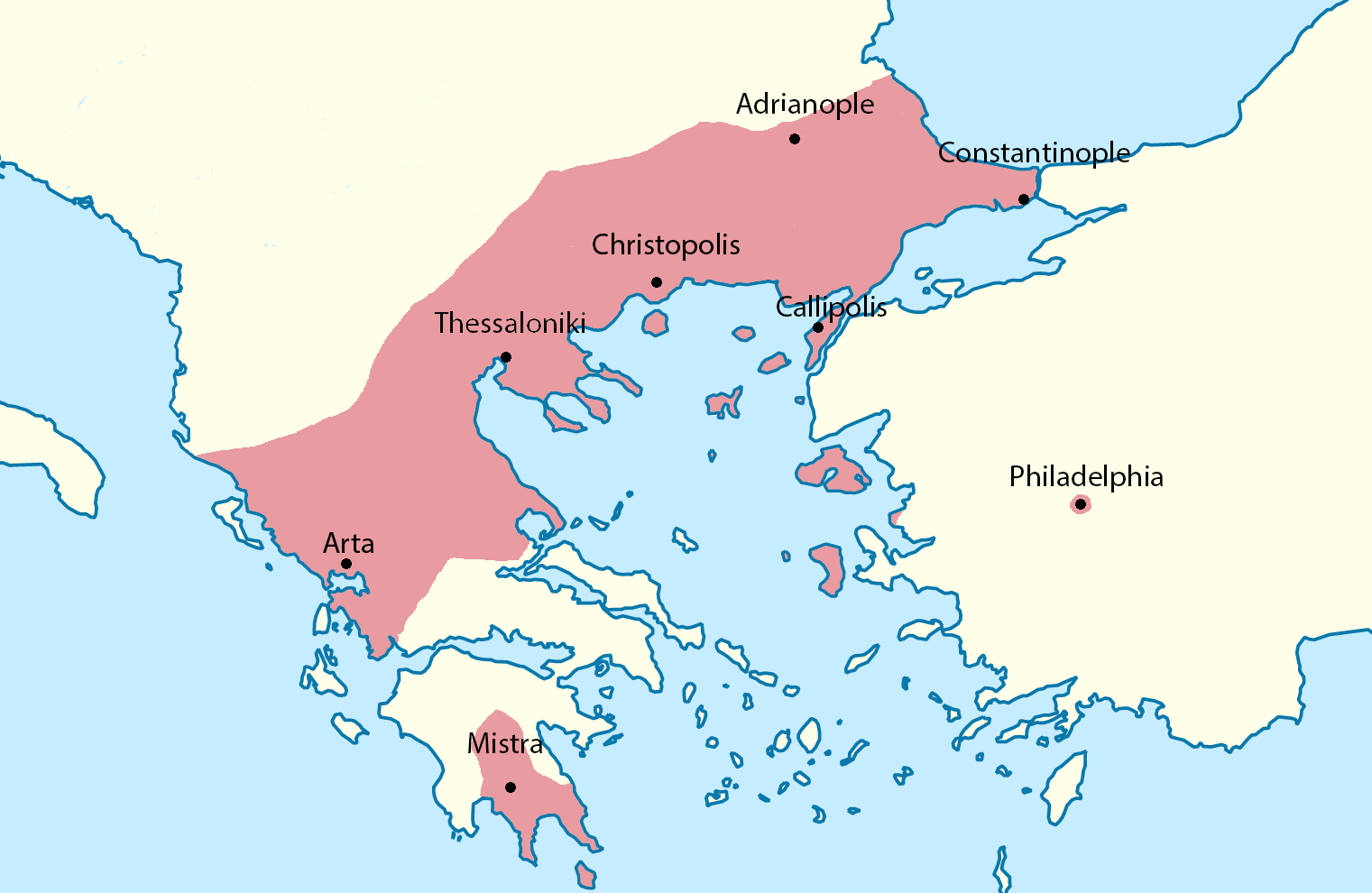
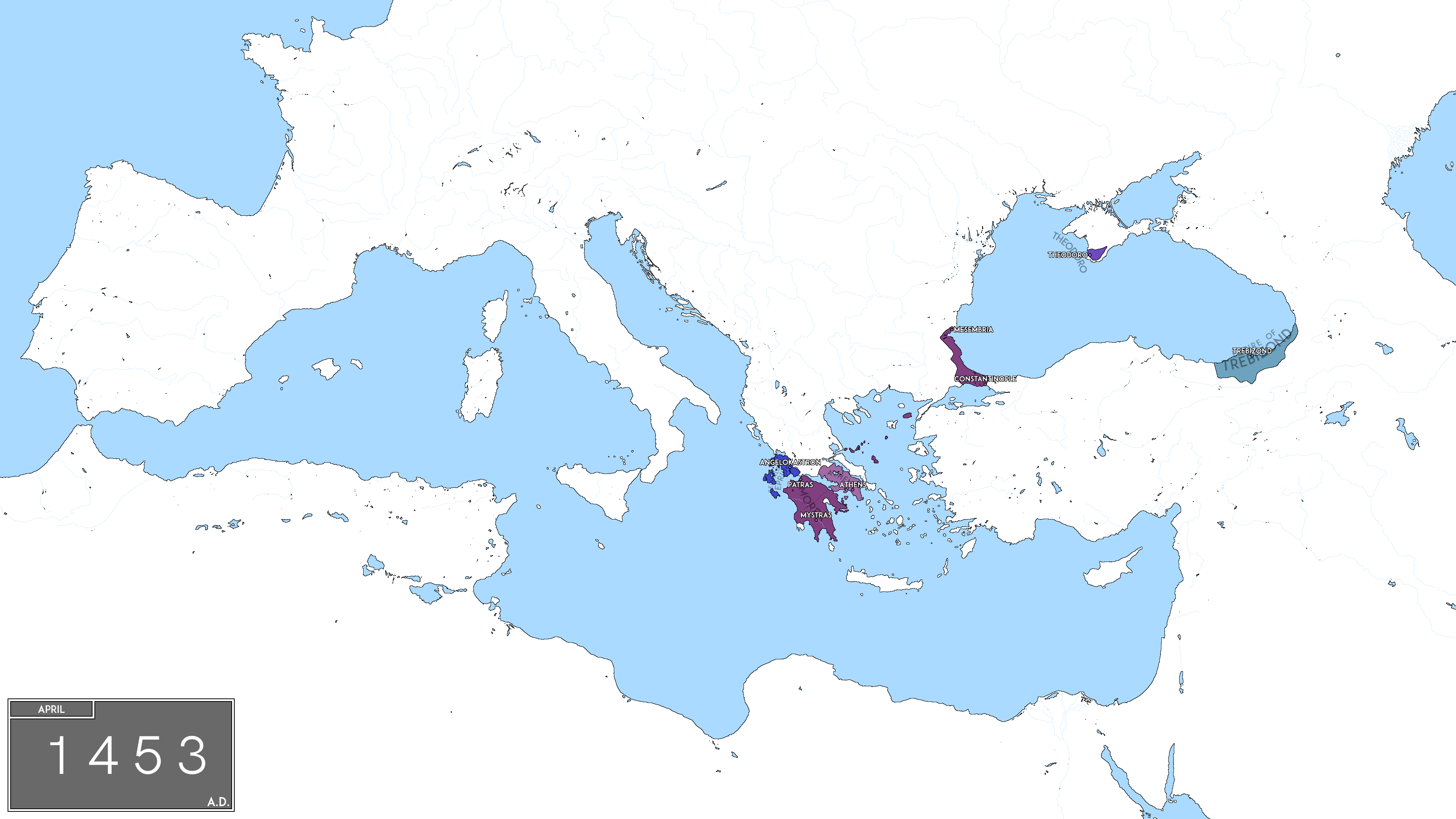
- The Despotate of Epirus in dark blue, the Empire of Trebizond in light blue and the Principality of Theodoro in violet.
- Capital: Constantinople (Note: The Empire had up to three capitals: Selymbria, Thessalonica and Constantinople.)
- Common languages: Greek (official); Latin; Armenian; Old Catalan; Aromanian; Albanian/Illyrian; Old Bulgarian; Old Anatolian Turkish and other South Slavic languages
- Religion: Greek Orthodoxy (Predominantly), Roman Catholicism and Sunni Islam (Minority)
- Demonym: Byzantine Greek
- Government: Absolute monarchy
- Emperor
  - 1261–1282: Michael VIII
  - 1282–1328: Andronikos II
  - 1295–1320: Michael IX
  - 1328–1341: Andronikos III
  - 1341–1376: John V
  - 1347–1354: John VI
  - 1376–1379: Andronikos IV
  - 1379–1390: John V
  - 1390: John VII
  - 1390–1391: John V
  - 1391–1425: Manuel II
  - 1425–1448: John VIII
  - 1448–1453: Constantine XI
- History
  - Reconquest of Constantinople from the Latins: 1261
  - Fall of Constantinople to the Ottomans: 1453
Preceded by	Succeeded by
Empire of Nicaea; Latin Empire	Ottoman Empire

The Byzantine Empire was ruled by emperors of the Palaiologos dynasty in the period between 1261 and 1453, from the restoration of Byzantine rule to Constantinople by the usurper Michael VIII Palaiologos following its recapture from the Latin Empire, founded after the Fourth Crusade (1204), up to the Fall of Constantinople to the Ottoman Empire. Together with the preceding Nicaean Empire and the contemporary Frankokratia, this period is known as the late Byzantine Empire.

From the start, the regime faced numerous problems. The Turks of Asia Minor had begun conducting raids and expanding into Byzantine territory in Asia Minor by 1263, just two years after the enthronement of the first Palaiologos emperor Michael VIII. Anatolia, which had formed the very heart of the shrinking empire, was systematically lost to numerous Turkic ghazis, whose raids evolved into conquering expeditions inspired by Islamic zeal, the prospect of economic gain, and the desire to seek refuge from the Mongols after the disastrous Battle of Köse Dağ in 1243. The Palaiologoi were engaged on several fronts, often continually, while the empire's supply of food and manpower dwindled. In this period, the Byzantine Empire found itself continually at war, both civil and interstate, with most interstate conflicts being with other Christian empires. Most commonly, these comprised the Second Bulgarian Empire, the Serbian Empire, the remnants of the Latin Empire and even the Knights Hospitaller.

The loss of land in the East to the Turks and in the West to the Bulgarians coincided with two disastrous civil wars, the Black Death, and the 1354 earthquake at Gallipoli which allowed the Turks to occupy the peninsula. By 1380, the Byzantine Empire consisted of the capital Constantinople and a few other isolated exclaves, which only nominally recognized the Emperor as their lord. Nonetheless, Byzantine diplomacy, political intrigue and the invasion of Anatolia by Timur allowed Byzantium to survive until 1453. The last remnants of the Byzantine Empire, the Despotate of the Morea and the Empire of Trebizond, fell shortly afterwards.

However, the Palaiologan period witnessed a renewed flourishing in art and the letters, in what has been called the Palaiologian Renaissance. The migration of Byzantine scholars to the West also helped to spark the Italian Renaissance.

== Background ==
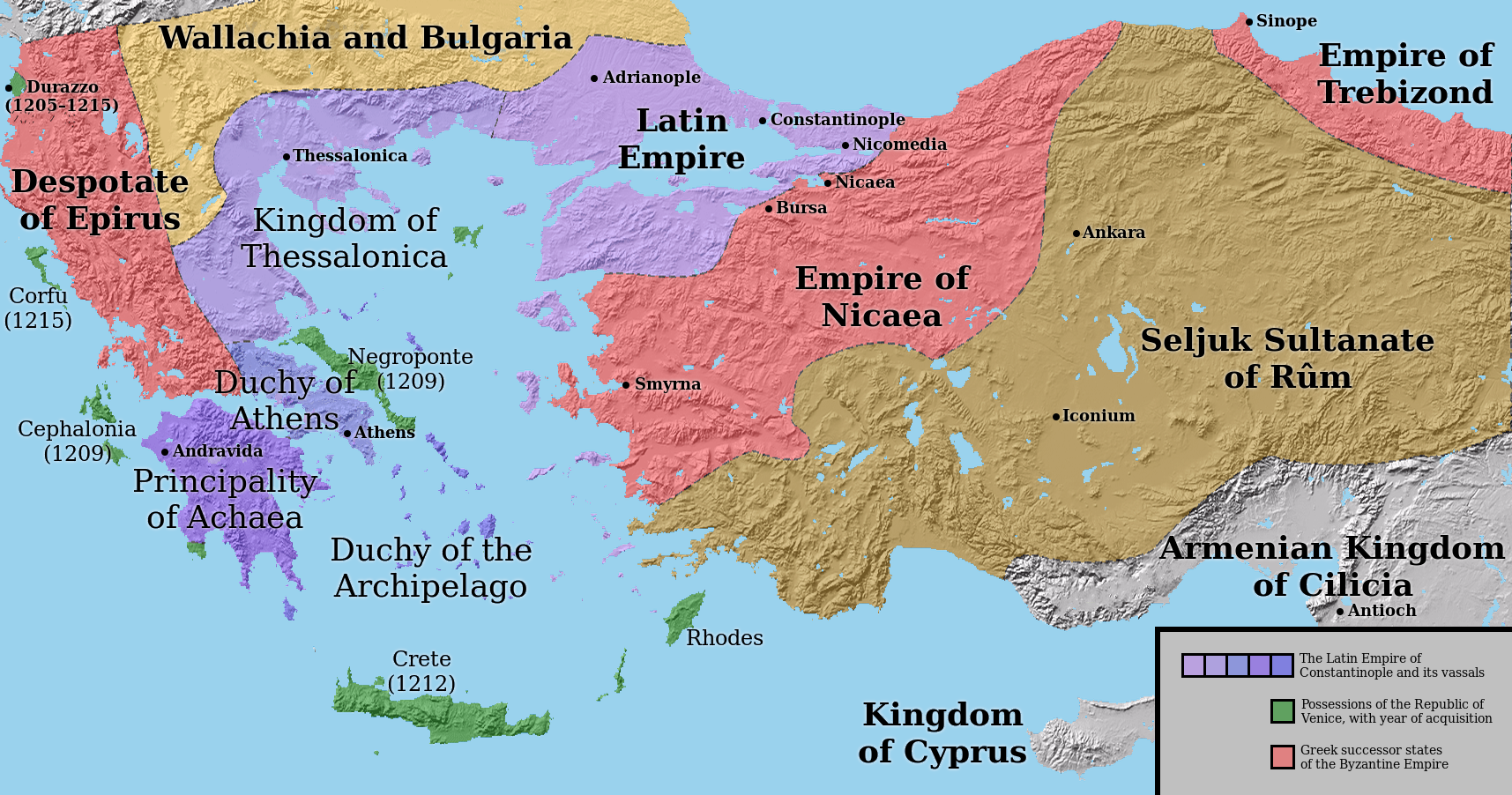
After 1204, the Byzantine Empire was partitioned into various successor states, with the Latin Empire in control of Constantinople

Following the Fourth Crusade, the Byzantine Empire had fractured into the Greek successor-states of Nicaea, Epirus, and Trebizond, with a multitude of Frankish and Latin possessions occupying the remainder, nominally subject to the Latin Emperors at Constantinople. In addition, the disintegration of the Byzantine Empire allowed the Bulgarians, the Serbs, and the various Turcoman emirates of Anatolia to make gains. Although Epirus was initially the strongest of the three Greek states, the Nicaeans succeeded in taking back the city of Constantinople from the Latin Empire.

The Nicaean Empire was successful in holding its own against its Latin and Seljuk opponents. At the Battle of Meander Valley, a Turkic force was repelled and an earlier assault on Nicaea led to the death of the Seljuk Sultan. In the west, the Latins were unable to expand into Anatolia; consolidating Thrace against Bulgaria was a challenge that kept the Latins occupied for the duration of the Latin Empire.

In 1261, the Empire of Nicaea was ruled by John IV Laskaris, a boy of 10 years. However, John IV was overshadowed by his co-emperor, Michael VIII Palaiologos. Palaiologos was a leading noble of military standing and the main figure of the regency of John IV, who had used this role to propel himself to the throne, and set the stage for his becoming sole Emperor of the restored Byzantine Empire.

== Michael VIII Palaiologos, 1261–1282 ==
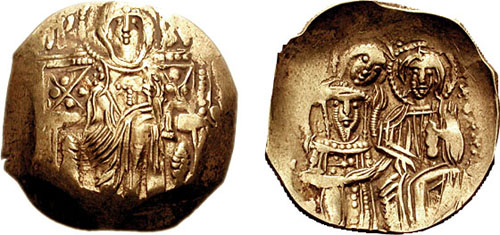
Hyperpyron of Michael VIII

In 1261, while the bulk of the Latin Empire's military forces were absent from Constantinople, the Byzantine General Alexios Strategopoulos used the opportunity to seize the city with 600 troops. Thrace, Macedonia and Thessalonica had already been taken by Nicaea in 1246. Following the capture of Constantinople, Michael ordered the blinding of John IV in December 1261, so as to become sole emperor. As a result, Patriarch Arsenios excommunicated Michael, but he was deposed and replaced by Joseph I.

=== Restoration of Constantinople ===
The Fourth Crusade and their successors, the Latin Empire, had done much to reduce Byzantium's finest city to an underpopulated wreck. Michael VIII began the task of restoring many monasteries, public buildings and defence works. The Hagia Sophia, looted in the Crusade of 1204, was refurbished to Greek Orthodox tradition. The Kontoskalion harbour and the walls of Constantinople were all strengthened against a possible new expedition by the Latin West. Many hospitals, hospices, markets, baths, streets and churches were built, some with private patronage. Even a new Mosque was built to compensate for the one burnt during the Fourth Crusade. These attempts were costly and crippling taxes were placed on the peasantry. Nonetheless, the city grew new cultural and diplomatic contacts, notably with the Mamelukes. Both had common enemies; Latin aggression, and later on, the Ottoman Turks.

=== Foreign policy ===
The Sultanate of Rum was in chaos and decentralized ever since the Mongol invasions in ca. 1240. As a result, the greatest threat to Byzantium was not the Muslims but their Christian counterparts in the West — Michael VIII knew that the Venetians and the Franks would no doubt launch another attempt to establish Latin rule in Constantinople. The situation became worse when Charles I of Anjou conquered Sicily from the Hohenstaufens in 1266. In 1267, Pope Clement IV arranged a pact, whereby Charles would receive land in the East in return for assisting a new military expedition to Constantinople. A delay on Charles' end meant that Michael VIII was given enough time to negotiate a union between the Church of Rome and that of Constantinople in 1274, thus removing papal support for an invasion of Constantinople.

Unfortunately for Michael VIII, the new union was seen as a fake by Clement's successor, Martin IV. The Greek Church was excommunicated, and Charles was given renewed papal support for the invasion of Constantinople. In order to counter this, Michael VIII subsidized Peter III of Aragon's attempts to seize Sicily from Charles. Michael's efforts paid off with the outbreak of the Sicilian Vespers, a revolt that overthrew the Angevin King of Sicily and installed Peter III of Aragon as King of Sicily in 1281.

For the remainder of his life, Michael campaigned to drive the Latins out of Greece and the Balkans, and secure his position versus the Bulgarians. He was largely successful, regaining several islands in the Aegean, and establishing a foothold in the Peloponnese, that would grow to become the Despotate of the Morea. The downside however was that Michael's efforts in the West absorbed most of the Empire's manpower and resources, and neglected the Asian provinces, where a new and fateful threat was rising: the beylik of Osman I, who by 1263 had captured Sogut. Nevertheless, the border was kept relatively secure, and no significant losses occurred in Asia Minor during Michael's reign.

Middle East c. 1263 KEY: Lighter red - Byzantine Empire; Dark red and magenta - other Greek states; Light green - Turkic lands; Dark green - Ottoman domain by the 1300s, dotted line indicates conquests up to 1326; Yellow -Cilicia; Purple - Latin states

=== Foreign policy ===
Michael VIII's foreign policy relied heavily on diplomacy; nevertheless, his construction projects and military campaigns against the remaining Latins were extensive as well as expensive; the Nicaean army was modeled around the Komnenian army, and while it was not as effective, it was just as burdensome on the treasury. The result was that heavy taxes were levied on the peasantry, something that the Ottomans would later use to their advantage, winning over these poverty-stricken peasants with promises of lower taxes.

The Second Council of Lyons and the ostensible union of the two Churches did little to avert Catholic aggression, while at the same time the Orthodox population, led by large parts of the priesthood, denounced Michael VIII as a traitor. His death in 1282 came as a relief to many, and his body was denied an Orthodox funeral, as a result of his policies towards Rome.

=== Legacy ===
Michael VIII was a very energetic, ambitious and capable emperor who had enlarged and preserved the Empire and had once again made Byzantium a power to be reckoned with in the region. His army, however, was still small, and diplomacy was relied upon more than ever. An extortionate tax system supported his ambitious foreign policies of expansion, as well as his numerous bribes and gifts to various potentates. He had put Byzantium on the road of recovery, but his achievements were still perilously fragile, as events would soon show.

== Andronikos II Palaiologos, 1282–1328 ==
Andronikos II was the son of Michael VIII. He ascended the throne in 1282, at the age of 24.

=== Foreign policy ===
Andronikos II was tied down with events in the West and the East. The Serbians under King Stefan Uroš II Milutin had begun invading the Balkans and took Skopje in 1282 and raids against Macedonia were launched throughout the 1290s. Byzantine counter-attacks failed to stop these, and as a result Andronikos was forced to resort to diplomacy, marrying his 5-year-old daughter to the Serbian King and ceding a number of forts from Ohrid to Stip to Strumica as a "dowry". Nonetheless, the Serbs continued their expansion.

Unlike his father, Andronikos II recognized the gravity of the situation in Asia Minor, and tried to drive out the Turks, utilizing a variety of methods. His first action was to move his court to Asia Minor, where he could better oversee the construction of fortifications and raise troop morale. His General, Alexios Philanthropenos, was an able commander, campaigning with some success against the Turks in the Meander Valley. Unfortunately Byzantium was robbed of his services when he staged an unsuccessful coup, leading to his blinding. Next Andronikos sent his son, Michael IX, and the Heteriarch George Mouzalon to attack the Turks who were laying siege to Nicomedia, but they were beaten at the Battle of Bapheus in 1302.

Not giving up, Andronikos hired the 6,500 strong "Catalan Company" of Almogavars, led by Roger de Flor. Originating from Catalonia, these hardy mercenaries were used to skirmishing against the Moors in Spain and now, for an extraordinarily high price, they drove the Turks back in Asia Minor. Once again, these successes were nullified when their leader, Roger de Flor, was assassinated on his way to meet Andronikos; the Catalans then revolted against imperial authority, and began pillaging and raiding cities in Thrace, leaving Asia Minor open to Turkish incursions. After this, Andronikos turned to diplomacy, asking the Ilkhanids of Persia to send troops to attack the Turks, but negotiations for such an alliance failed.

=== Domestic policy ===
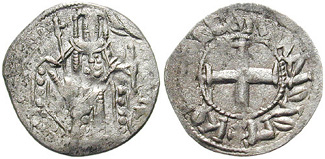
Andronikos II's debasement of the Byzantine currency, along with his co-rule with his father, his son and his grandson as well as his own sole rule, resulted in the minting of several different coins during his reign.

Andronikos II ordered the Union of the Orthodox and Catholic Churches to be canceled, a move which pleased many. But he also ordered drastic reductions in the military, and effectively disbanded the navy, which his father had worked hard to build up. As a result, tax reductions throughout the Empire were possible, earning him greater popularity while seriously undermining Byzantium's abilities to deal with its opponents. He debased the hyperpyron currency and heavily taxed the military elite of the pronoiarioi, thereby further reducing Byzantium's military capability. While these solved some problems that Michael VIII had left for his son, it unraveled his father's attempts at restoring the power of the Byzantine Empire; where Michael VIII had attempted to deal with problems outside the Empire, Andronikos aimed to solve the internal problems resulting from his father's reign.

=== Civil War and abdication ===
Andronikos II's policies were not successful in dealing with Byzantium's external problems; however, it would be threats from within the Empire that led to his abdication — in 1320 Andronikos III, the young (in his twenties) grandson of Andronikos II was disinherited by the Emperor. Andronikos III's brother Manuel Palaiologos had been accidentally murdered by Andronikos III's companions over a competitive love affair. His father (Michael IX), the son of Andronikos II, died of shock as a result of his son's death. Andronikos III did not take his disinheritance lightly — organizing an armed opposition, he succeeded in drawing support with promises of generous tax cuts, even beyond those enacted by Andronikos II. Andronikos II was powerless to stop the young usurper; he granted him Thrace as an appanage in 1321, the title of co-emperor in 1322, and after a small war where the Bulgarians and Serbians played the two sides against each other, Andronikos II was forced to abdicate and retire as a monk to a monastery, where he died in 1332.

Despite the calamities of the civil war, Andronikos III was about to revitalise the Empire. Although Asia Minor was at this point destined to fall to the Turks, it had been in a worse position in 1091 and yet still recovered by Byzantium.

=== Legacy ===
Andronikos II attempted to solve Byzantium's internal problems more than his father had. The solutions he chose however had severe repercussions. They undermined the military and financial basis of the state, and the disasters suffered by his foreign policy failures further worsened the situation. Dissatisfaction from his failure, his old age and a "reckless grandson" culminated in his enforced abdication.

== Andronikos III, 1328–1341 ==
=== Foreign policy ===
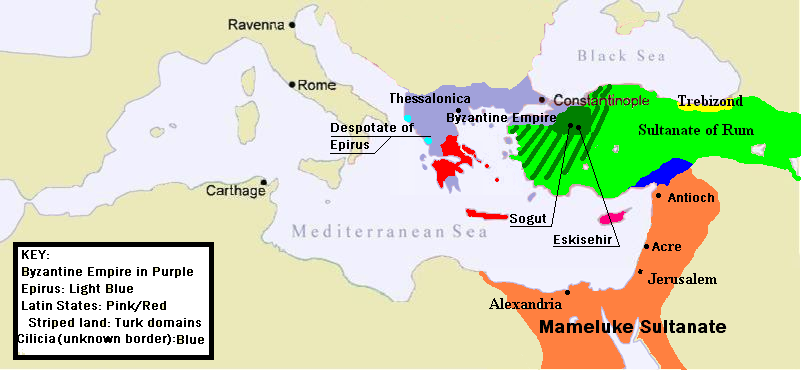
Byzantium at the beginning of Andronikos III's reign.

The rule of Andronikos III is characterized as the last genuine attempt to restore Byzantine fortunes. His attempts came close to fruition, but the many hostile neighbors of Byzantium eventually took their toll on an Empire in decline.

His first concern was that of Asia Minor. Nicaea, until 1261 the capital of the Empire, was under siege by Ottoman Turks. In the summer of 1329, Andronikos III launched a relief attempt which culminated in a defeat at the Battle of Pelekanon on June 10, and in 1331, the city fell. Not wishing to see Nicomedia or the other few remaining forts in Asia Minor suffer the same fate, Andronikos III sought to pay off the Ottomans with tribute — the Ottomans did not stop at this and seized Nicomedia as well in 1337.

Despite this, Andronikos III scored a few successes in the Aegean: in 1329, Chios was recovered, and in 1335, Andronikos arranged an alliance involving financial indemnities with the Turkic Emir Bahud-din Umur, Bey of Aydın, and was able to recover Lesbos and Phocaea from the Latins.

In Europe, Andronikos III had mixed results; Thessaly returned to Imperial rule in 1333, but Serbia once again began expanding southwards: led by the Byzantine renegade Syrgiannes Palaiologos, Serbian forces took five key forts from Byzantium in 1334 and forced it to recognize the new borders. Andronikos was then forced to recognize Serbian rule in Macedonia. In addition, Andronikos faced a further reversal when leading his army at Rousokastron where he was defeated by the Bulgarians under their leader Ivan Alexander. Nevertheless, Andronikos was able to bring back Epirus into the fold in 1341 through the use of diplomacy. The result was that while the Empire was reduced to its European territories, it had succeeded in bringing much of Greece under its control. Unfortunately for the newly expanded Byzantium, Stephen Dusan (ruling Serbia from 1331) decided to take these lands as well from Byzantium. The death of Andronikos III and the resulting chaos left the Empire in no position to fight back.

=== Legacy ===
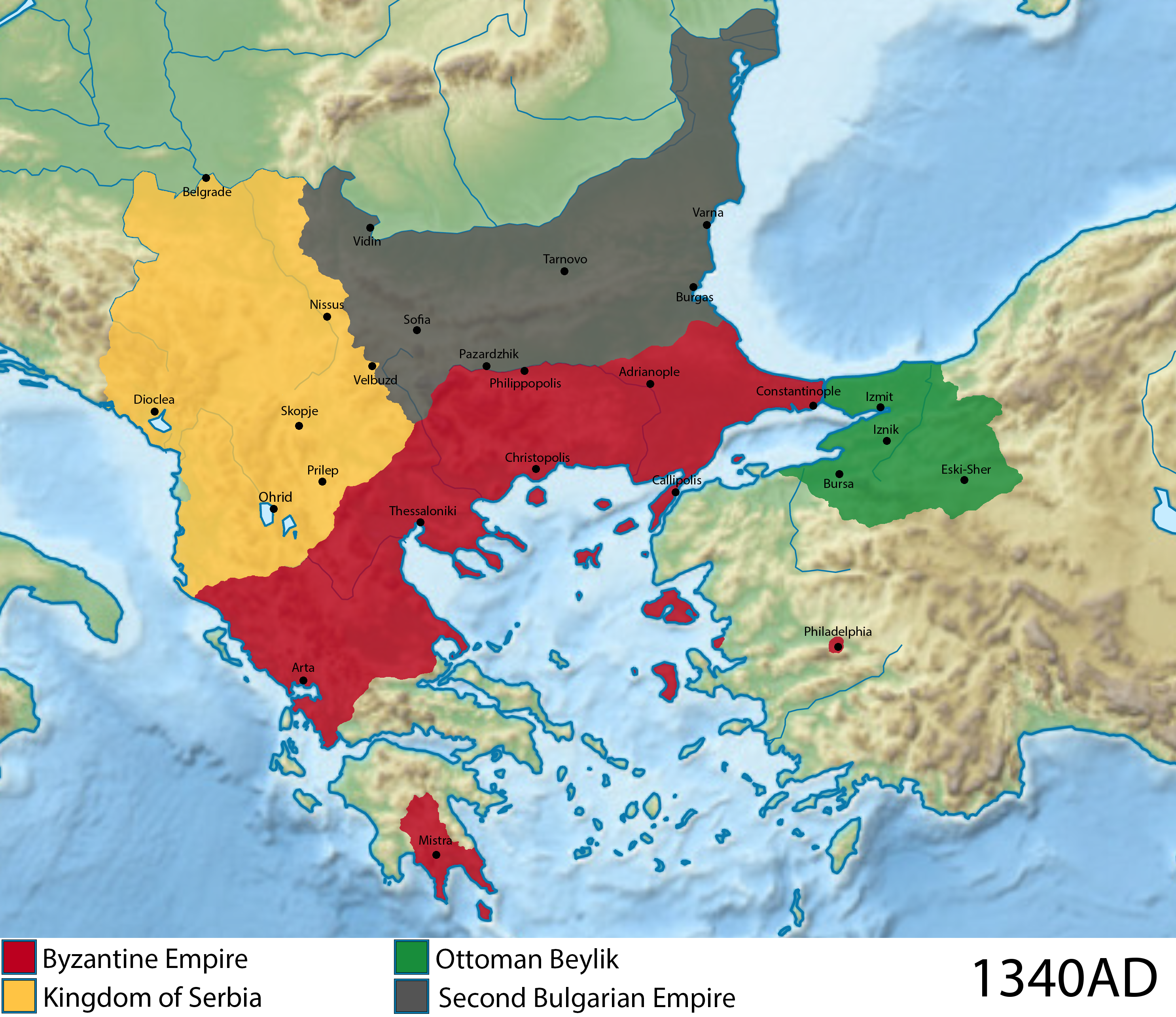
The Byzantine Empire in 1340 a year before the death of Andronikos III.

Although ultimately unsuccessful, the reign of Andronikos III was one of the last bright spots in Byzantine history, as the Empire's position was becoming increasingly precarious. Andronikos was able to score some successes in his life as he campaigned vigorously against the Genoese with success and reestablished some control over Epirus and Thessaly. Throughout his reign, he was also able to work with competent administrators such as John Kantakouzenos who, along with many of the nobles, supported Andronikos during the civil war with Andronikos II. However, numerous reversals against Byzantium's enemies such as Serbia and the rising Ottomans at battles such as Pelekanon further drained the power Byzantium had in comparison to its neighbors. This would be a situation that would not be helped by his sudden death in the 1340s which resulted in a civil war between the regency of John V(a coalition of Anna of Savoy, Alexios Apokaukos and the patriarch of Constantinople, John XIV) and the nobility who promoted John Kantakouzenos as emperor. In addition, diplomacy became less useful, as Byzantium's enemies realized that the Emperor had not the military or even economic might to back his word. While there was a general decline in the Empire's fortunes, Andronikos III's death would be the coup de grâce for the Empire — his 10-year-old son was led by a regency that was torn apart in dynastic rivalries which led to the Second Palaiologan Civil War and the recognition of John Kantakouzenos as emperor and a catastrophe from which Byzantium would never recover.

== The rise and fall of Kantakouzenos, 1341–1357 ==
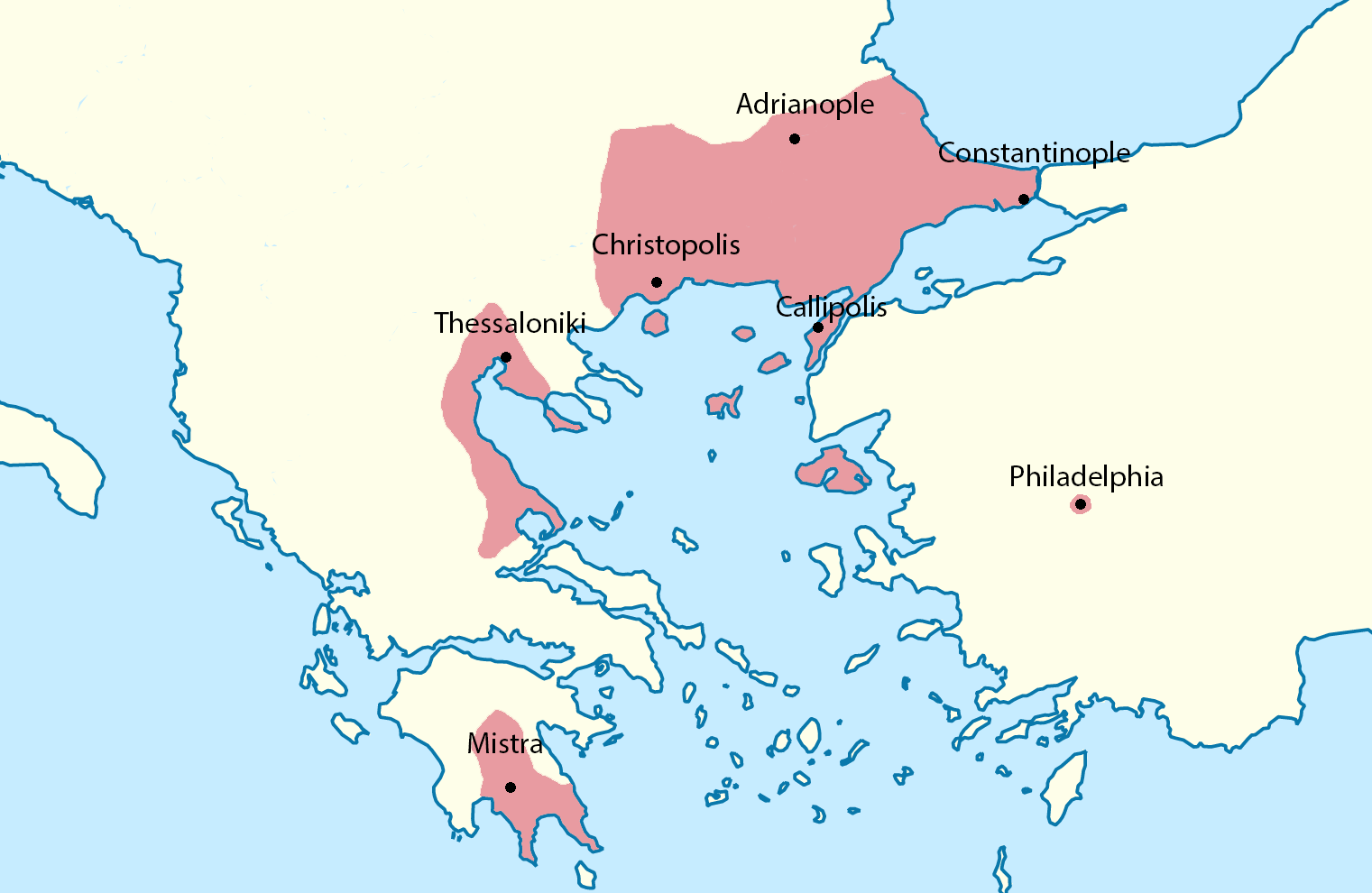
Byzantine Empire in the year 1350

The Byzantine Empire entered into a new era of decay in 1341. The Empire was ravaged by multiple serious disasters — alongside wars and civil wars, renewed epidemics of bubonic plague swept through its diminished lands. The first outbreak occurred in 1347, and between the 1360s and 1420s, eight further outbreaks of plague were recorded. Cities were full of social unrest between the corrupt wealthy (who had been exploiting the tax system for their own benefit) and the countless landless peasants burdened by the demands of the government. Religious controversy, the cancer of Byzantium in the 7th and 8th centuries, once again emerged in the form of the Hesychasm controversy, which eventually became a doctrine of the Eastern Orthodox church. There were numerous earthquakes, destroying Byzantium's infrastructure — the fortress of Gallipoli was destroyed in 1354 by such an earthquake and the Ottoman Turks lost no time in taking it and establishing a bridgehead in Europe. Meanwhile, the Serbs continued pressing south, removing any nominal Imperial control in Epirus.

=== The civil war of 1341–1347 ===
John V, ten years old at his ascension, was guided by a regency consisting of his mother, Anna of Savoy, John VI Kantakouzenos and the Patriarch of Constantinople (John XIV Kalekas).

The Patriarch, aided by the ambitious Alexios Apokaukos, sparked the civil conflict when he convinced the Empress that John V's rule was threatened by the ambitions of Kantakouzenos. In September 1341, while Kantakouzenos was in Thrace, Kalekas declared himself as regent and launched a vicious attack on Kantakouzenos, his supporters and family. In October, Anna ordered Kantakouzenos to resign his command. Kantakouzenos not only refused, but declared himself Emperor at Didymoteichon, allegedly to protect John V's rule from Kalekas. Whether or not Kantakouzenos wished to be Emperor is not known, but the provocative actions of the Patriarch forced Kantakouzenos to fight to retain his power and started the civil war.

There were not nearly enough troops to defend Byzantium's borders at the time and there certainly was not enough for the two factions to split; consequently, foreigner mercenaries were brought in. Kantakouzenos hired Turks and Serbs — his main supply of Turkish mercenaries came from the Bey of Aydın, a nominal ally established by Andronikos III. The Regency of John V relied on Turkish mercenaries as well. However, Kantakouzenos began to draw support from the Ottoman Sultan Orhan, who wed Kantakouzenos' daughter in 1345. By 1347, Kantakouzenos had triumphed and entered Constantinople. However, in his hour of victory, he came to an accord with Anna and her son, John V: John V (now 15 years of age) and Kantakouzenos would rule as co-emperors, though John V would be the junior in this relationship. This unlikely partnership was not destined to last long.

=== Reign and fall of John VI Kantakouzenos, 1347–1357 ===
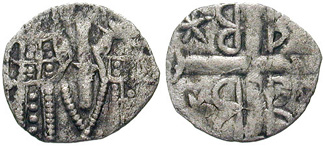
Byzantine coins showing John V and his co-emperor & guide Kantakouzenos during their peaceful co-existence

Kantakouzenos had a son, Matthew Kantakouzenos — and any hope of keeping peace between John V and Matthew became more remote as the two grew older and more independent. John V wed Kantakouzenos' daughter, thus becoming his son in law, in a move designed to bind the two families, but it was destined to fail.

In 1353, Kantakouzenos was still hopeful that peace would be maintained, but in that year, John V launched a military attack on Matthew, thereby re-igniting the civil war. John V was demoted and exiled to the island of Tenedos, one of the few islands in the Aegean still under Byzantine control, while Kantakouzenos made his son Matthew co-emperor. John V would not give up so easy however, and in 1354 Ottoman troops began crossing over into Thrace in his support. The citizens of Constantinople became gripped with fear and in November of that same year, John V launched a successful coup with Genoan aid. Kantakouzenos now abdicated and retired to a monastery, where he would write his memoirs and thoughts until his death in 1383.

Matthew Kantakouzenos, no doubt disappointed with his father's failure, continued to resist John V. Since the Ottoman Sultan Orhan was his brother-in-law, he was able to obtain troops from him, but had barely begun his campaign when he was captured in the summer of 1356. He was forced to renounce his claims in 1357 and exiled to the Morea sometime between 1361 and 1383, though other sources indicate 1391 a possible date. At 25 years, John V had managed to establish himself firmly as ruler of the Empire, at the cost of bleeding out all its resources.

=== Turkish immigration ===
The lands ravaged and depopulated by the civil war were filled up by arriving Turks who colonised the land through a mixture of conquest and trade. The result was that Byzantium's power was undermined beyond all recovery — two hundred years ago Byzantium could rely on the people living in the lands of Anatolia, Greece, Macedonia and several large islands like Cyprus and Crete. Now the population under its control was limited to the few remaining cities in Byzantine possession, namely Thessalonica and Constantinople and the surrounding countryside, and the Despotate of the Morea. The immigration of Turks would be decisive in the survival of the Empire as it gave her most dire enemy, the Ottomans, a new power base, not in Asia but now in Europe.

== John V, 1354–1391 ==
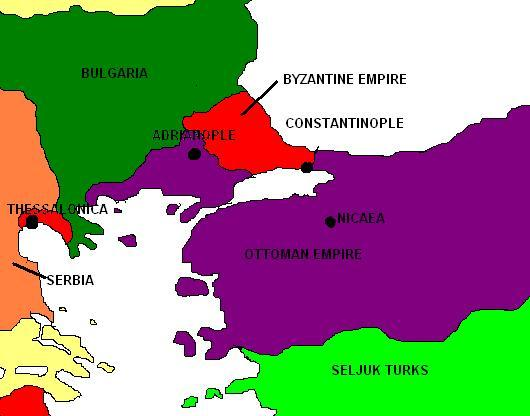
Byzantium (in red) in 1369, after the Ottomans conquered the city of Adrianople

John V Palaiologos now had to face the serious threat the Ottomans posed to Byzantium. In the 1360s, the Turks continued to drive through Thrace, taking Byzantine, Bulgarian and Serbian settlements.

=== Plea to the West ===
Like his predecessors Alexios I Komnenos and Michael VIII, John V now turned to the Pope and offered the promise of a Union of the two Churches in the hopes of receiving military assistance. As a guarantee of compliance, John V offered his son, Manuel. In the past, Byzantium's cry for assistance were answered with mixed results — pillaging Crusaders would sack both friend and foe but the First Crusade had been largely beneficial and no doubt John V envisioned a repeat of such a Crusade. This time, however, the Papacy was unmoved by the calamity facing the Byzantine Empire.

Fortunately for John V, he had other European connections — his mother was Anna of Savoy, and her nephew (being John V's cousin) was concerned for the safety of his Greek counterpart. Sailing from Venice in June 1366 with dreams of initiating yet another Crusade, Amadeo VI of Savoy arrived at and seized the fortress of Gallipoli from the Ottomans and handed it back to the Byzantines, hoping that this would stem the tide of Turkish emigration into Thrace. However, the Turks had by now firmly established themselves in Thrace. Amadeo and John spent much time between 1367 and 1369 thinking of ways to stave off defeat. Amadeo returned to Europe via Rome and brought with him Byzantine envoys. The Pope again was uninterested, but called for John V to visit him. In 1369, when the Ottomans finally captured Adrianople (though some sources indicate 1365), John V rushed to Rome and confessed his Catholic faith both privately and at a public spectacle.

Nevertheless, in 1371 John V returned empty-handed, having humiliated himself and done nothing to improve the deteriorating situation in the Balkans.

=== Ottoman vassalage of John V ===
In 1371, the Serbs mustered their strength and prepared to launch an attack to drive back the Turks from Thrace. In a crushing victory, the Ottomans annihilated the Serbian army at the Battle of Maritsa, and in its aftermath, many surviving lords submitted to the Ottoman Sultan Murad I. Byzantium was in no better position and after taking Serres from the defeated Serbs, John V swore allegiance as a vassal to Murad.

== Third Palaiologan Civil War, 1373–1379 ==
John V's rule was an unhappy one, resulting in his vassalage to Murad I. However, it must have been even worse when his eldest son and heir to the throne Andronikos IV Palaiologos rebelled against his father in 1373. Curiously, this rebellion coincided with the rebellion of Murad I's son, Savcı Bey and the two worked towards fomenting revolution in their peoples. Consequently, both the Byzantine and Ottoman rulers were facing their sons and as a result, coordinated efforts were made to defeat both. John V had his eldest son, Andronikos IV, along with the latter's son, John VII, partially blinded, while Murad I defeated his son, Savci, and had him executed. Manuel, the second son of John V, was made co-emperor and heir to the throne.

Unfortunately for John V, Andronikos IV and his son John VII escaped. With Genoan and Turkish aid, they returned to Constantinople and succeeded in overthrowing John V, imprisoning him and Manuel. In exchange for Ottoman aid, Andronikos IV handed the fortress of Gallipoli over to the Ottomans, thus rendering the only genuine European aid, provided by Amadeo of Savoy, useless. Again, prison break became the next event with John V and Manuel escaping Constantinople, offering the Ottoman Sultan higher tribute than normally paid, in return for help in taking over Constantinople. Andronikos IV, having been beaten yet again, evaded capture and slipped into the Genoese district of Galata with his family and hostages. John V, only interested in securing his throne and stability, came to conclude a pact with Andronikos IV in 1381, recognizing him as heir with John VII as heir apparent, thus removing Manuel from the line of succession.

Naturally, Manuel felt betrayed by this move which demoted him from co-emperor. Returning to Thessalonica in 1382, he rebelled and established his rule over Thessaly and Epirus, thus "expanding" the Empire, at least nominally, and thereby catching the Ottoman Sultan's attention. Murad I besieged Thessalonica in 1383, beginning a siege that would last until 1387. Meanwhile, Andronikos IV died and his son, John VII, began quarreling with his grandfather, John V.

With Thessalonica surrendering in 1387 and his position rather hopeless, Manuel returned to John V and, with the Sultan's assent, began making conciliatory offers to his father. John V realized that accepting his second son back would cause his grandson to rebel in turn, and therefore he simply kept Manuel in exile in Lemnos. Eventually, John VII did rebel against his grandfather — news of Manuel's arrival at Constantinople and John V's reconciliation talks with him prompted John VII to head to Genoa and then to the new Ottoman Sultan, Bayezid the Thunderbolt, to seek aid in order to topple John V.

John VII's rebellion succeeded initially, taking Constantinople from John V, but Manuel countered by rousing the rest of the empire and its few remaining military assets and turned them against John VII. Manuel also received aid from the Knights of St. John stationed at Rhodes, where he "donated" religious relics made of precious metals to them for their support. John refused to give up his right to rule as Emperor of Byzantium until his death in 1408. By then however, the Ottoman Sultan Bayezid had recognized Manuel II Palaiologos as co-emperor of Byzantium alongside his father John V, and finally, when John V died in 1391, as sole Emperor.

== Manuel II Palaiologos, 1391–1420 ==
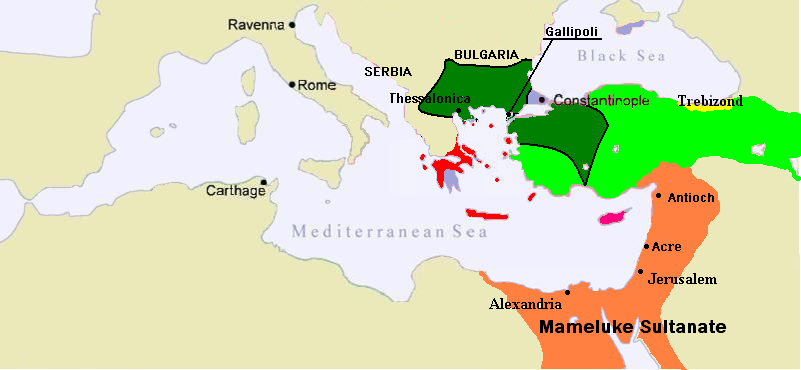
Byzantium in 1389. Thrace was lost in the previous three decades.

Manuel II's reign saw another temporary respite for the Byzantines. For an Empire in such trouble, he succeeded in retaking some territory and held it to the end of his reign. His limited success largely came through the resurrection of Mongol Power in the East and the great friendship achieved between Manuel II and Mehmed I. However, he lived long enough to see his son undo much of his achievements.

=== Vassalage to 1394 ===
Manuel II's first priority was to establish an agreement with Bayezid I. John VII was a favorite of Bayezid so Manuel II was in a dangerous position. He eventually sealed an agreement. However, the Ottoman Sultan became infuriated by Manuel II's attempts to reconcile his nephew John VII. Manuel was concerned that John VII might once again launch a coup against him so wished to end the threat diplomatically. Bayezid ordered Manuel's execution, but then reduced his furious response and instead demanded that Constantinople build another Mosque and that a colony of Turks be established.

=== Rebellion; Byzantium survives, 1394–1402 ===
Manuel's next steps were bold and seemingly foolish — not only did he refuse to pay the Sultan tribute, he refused to answer the Sultan's messages and Bayezid set about laying siege to Constantinople. In 1394, his siege began and would continue for eight years. Manuel II realized that while the city could endure a half-hearted blockade, it did not have the military assets to man the walls of Constantinople. At first, the situation was not so dire — a massive counter-attack by the West was to be launched as the Crusade of Nicopolis. In a titanic battle, Bayezid force-marched his army to a stunning yet costly victory. Thousands were killed, but now Bayezid was able to turn his armies fully against Constantinople.

The situation was dire; so much so that John VII, Manuel's dire opponent, was left in charge of Constantinople. He made one grand tour of Europe in 1399, stopping at Venice, Padua, Milan, Paris and London, where he met the English King Henry IV; in England, he was well received and treated to a jousting tournament. However, Manuel was unable to secure any help from Western Christendom.

The seemingly insurmountable pressure was ultimately relieved as a result of events in Anatolia. Bayezid, his position in Europe secure, turned his attentions to Anatolia and attempted to bring the various Turcoman tribes under formal Ottoman control. These actions greatly offended Timur, leader of the Timurid Empire, who saw Anatolia as within his sphere of influence. In response, Timur invaded Anatolia and defeated Bayezid in 1402 near Ankara. The defeat caused a panic amongst the Turks in Anatolia, who frantically began crossing over to Europe, with the assistance of Venetian and Genoese ships.

Manuel, who was still in Europe, arrived in 1403 to a welcoming sight — Constantinople free from Ottoman siege. John VII had remained loyal, handing back control of the capital to Manuel. In addition, Thessalonica was handed back to the Byzantines by Prince Suleyman as a gesture of goodwill and in an effort to curry favour at a time the Ottoman Empire was weakened by the war with Timur and effectively split in two.

=== Ottoman Interregnum, 1402–13 ===
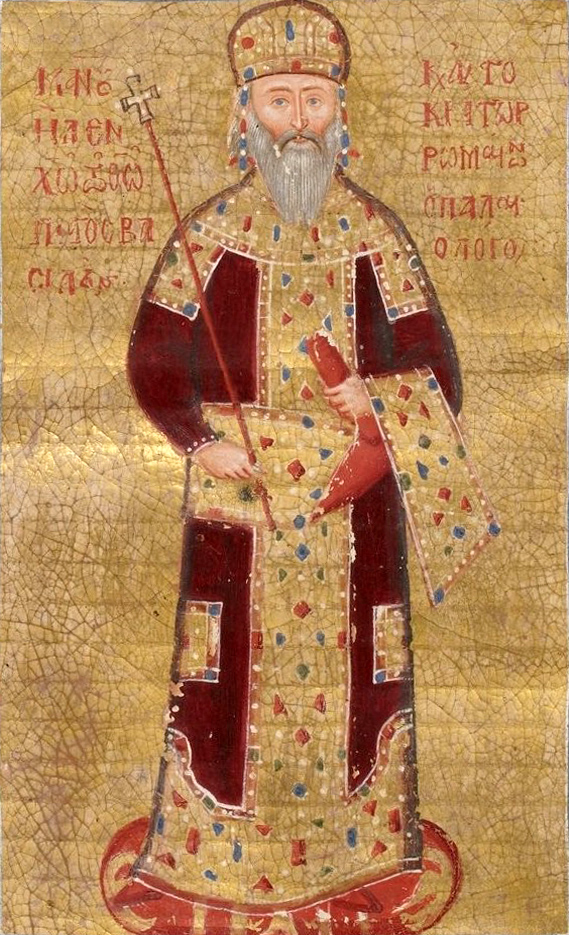
Manuel II lived to 75 years of age

The defeat of the Ottomans considerably changed the mood within Constantinople. The rewards reaped by the Empire were outstanding considering that only a short time had passed since the city (and possibly the Empire itself) stood on the brink of destruction. John VII appeared to have achieved numerous other benefits for Byzantium. The first was a non-aggression treaty between the local Christian powers (who were also free from Ottoman servitude), meaning that the disasters of Andronikos III's later rule would not be repeated. Next were a treaty between Byzantium and the successor of Bayezid, Süleyman who was in Asia Minor, confirming Byzantium's freedom from paying tribute. The Empire also gained Mount Athos and coastal land of the Black Sea from Constantinople to Varna. As an added bonus, Imperial authority was asserted over a number of Aegean Islands. The latter would serve in the future as refuge for many Greeks seeking to escape Ottoman expansion.

Bayezid's sons lost no time fighting each other for their father's shattered realm. By 1413, Mehmed I had emerged as the victor. However, the Byzantines had made sure to support the victor and Mehmed I did not forget the kindness of the Byzantines and was able to "control" his Turkish subjects from expanding into Byzantine territory.

=== Resumption of hostilities ===
Manuel II Palaiologos was 70 years of age in 1421 and believed that the time had come for him to retire and give his eldest son, John VIII, the opportunity to rule with a more aggressive manner than he had done so. At the same time, a far less restrained Murad II, son of Mehmed I, came to the Ottoman throne in May of that year. With two men uninterested in diplomacy on the thrones of Byzantium and the Ottoman Sultanate, war was inevitable.

The Byzantines were the first to make a move when John VIII and his advisors made a risky decision by inciting a rebellion within the Ottoman Sultanate. In August 1421, they backed a man named Mustafa who claimed to be a long lost son of Bayezid the Thunderbolt. In Europe, Mustafa's rebellion worked well and he gathered some support. However, in August 1422, Murad II had this rebellion crushed and Mustafa received the traditional execution (hanging) shortly after, something any rebel would have expected. Murad II was enraged and had an army sent to Constantinople and to Thessalonika, the latter falling in 1430. Murad II was unable to take Constantinople by force. Nonetheless, the situation in the Capital was dire enough for Manuel II to come out of retirement and incite yet another rebellion in Asia Minor under Murad II's brother, Kucuk Mustafa. Initial rebel success, including a siege of Bursa was too much for Murad II to ignore so the siege of Constantinople was lifted to deal with this threat, and to the Byzantines' greatest despair, dealt with it successfully.

Manuel II was now out of tricks to save the erroneous rule of his son, John VIII. In September 1423, Thessalonika was surrendered to the Venetians, no doubt hoping to draw in the Western Powers into a new crusade and, if not, at least their wealth would enable them to defend it. In February 1424, Manuel II Palaiologos re-established Byzantium as a vassal of the Ottomans — 300,000 silver coins were to be paid to the Sultan on annual basis. That the Empire managed to accomplish this at its lowest ebb is remarkable. Nonetheless, until the 1450s, the Ottomans would not make any concerted efforts to overcome the walls of Constantinople, and the city retained a tenuous security for the next two decades.

== John VIII takes over ==
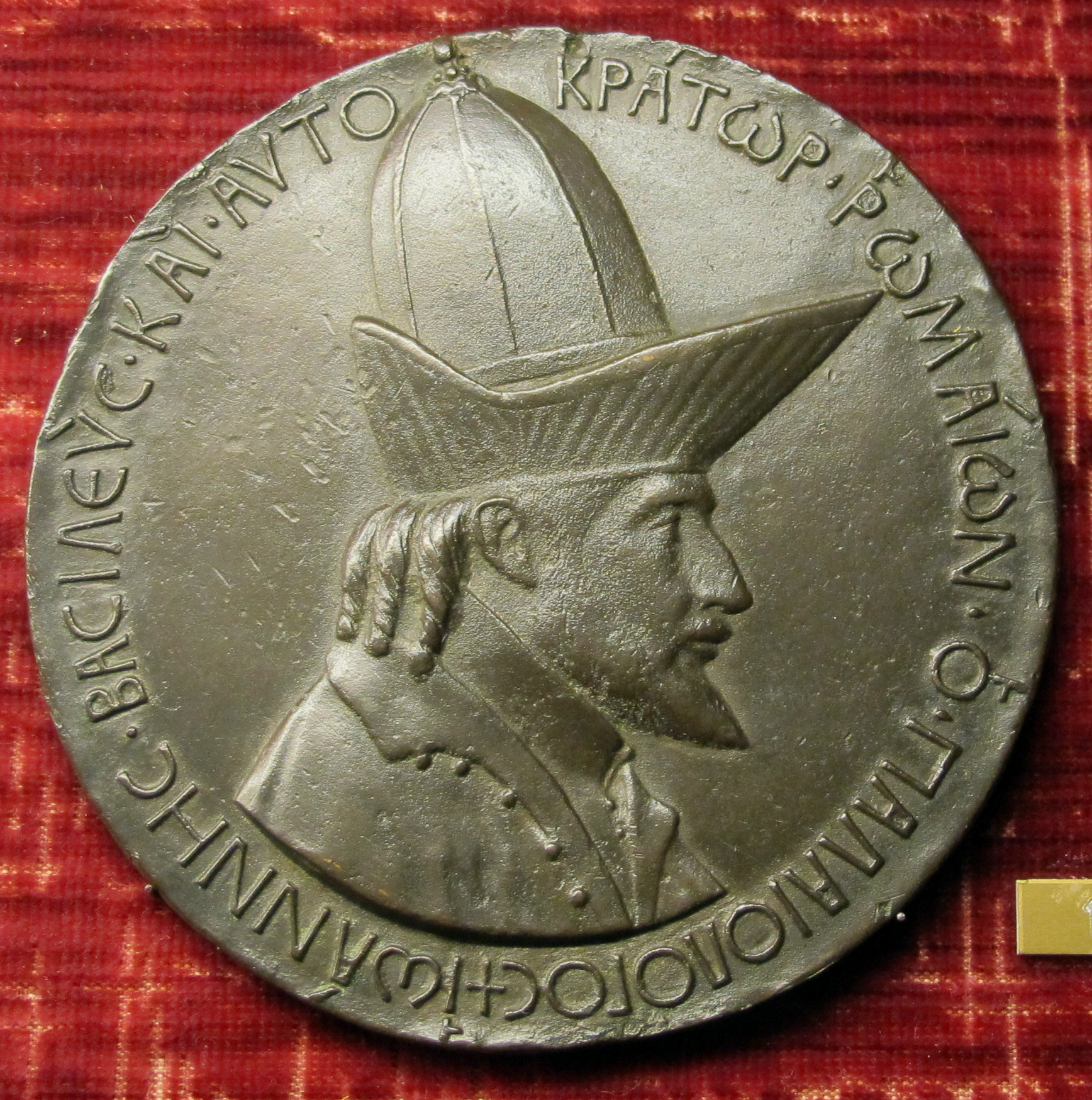
Medal of the Emperor John VIII Palaiologos during his visit to Florence, by Pisanello (1438). The legend reads, in Greek: "John the Palaiologos, basileus and autokrator of the Romans".

Manuel II's final years saw his gains wasted and the Empire status quo ante 1391. John VIII was still hopeful that he could emulate his Father's success and more. Like his predecessors, his attempts were in vain. And just like his predecessors, he relied too heavily on a Pope not willing to give, but only take; take that is, the Church of a wretched state surrounded by the Ottomans, soon-to-be Christendom's direst foe.

=== Union with Rome ===
Uniting the Greek church with that of Rome was a simple matter, since all the bargaining chips were in the hands of the Roman Catholic West. John VIII, as the de facto head of the Byzantine Church ordered the Byzantine Church to accept Papal primacy and declared that the Filioque dispute arose from semantic confusion. Few on Byzantium's side were impressed with the Union between 1438 and 1439 held in Ferrara and Florence, not only at the terms at which the Byzantine Church had to stoop to, but also at the non-existent aid to Byzantium. One can safely say that the most notable effect of the Union was the increased resentment between Byzantium's populace and the Imperial government.

=== Varna ===
In the late 1440s, the Ottomans experienced difficulty in bringing their Christian vassals in the Balkans into line. Hungary began launching successful campaigns against the Turks in Serbia, leading to the Serbian Despot and the Albanian resistance leader George Kastrioti Skanderbeg into direct opposition with their former masters. This led to one of the last great Crusades of a united Western Christendom — Crusade of Varna. Murad II was in no position to stop these troublesome westerners since he was overwhelmed with problems by easterners in Anatolia, the core of the Ottoman realm. Therefore, Murad hastily concluded a peace treaty in the Balkans. The Hungarians soon broke the treaty, but at Varna a hastily assembled Ottoman army crushed the Crusaders and left the Balkans at the mercy of Ottoman vengeance.

John VIII died in 1448. His reign lasted two decades. His achievement was the continued survival of the Empire. Yet Byzantium was now hanging by a thread. With insufficient military manpower for its own defense, an economy ruined by years of warfare, a depopulated capital, and insufficient territory to provide a basis for recovery, the Empire's position was becoming untenable. John was severely constrained by his circumstances, and proved unable to improve the fortunes of the state. He was succeeded by his brother Constantine XI. The new emperor would be Byzantium's last sovereign ruler.

== Constantine XI ==
Constantine's reign was short; from 1448 (some sources say 1449) until 1453. Constantine XI, like many of his predecessors who took the Union between Eastern and Western Christendom seriously, lived as a Catholic. Not much is known of his reign, except that he died with his soldiers in the final fight for Constantinople.

=== Defiance, defence and defeat ===
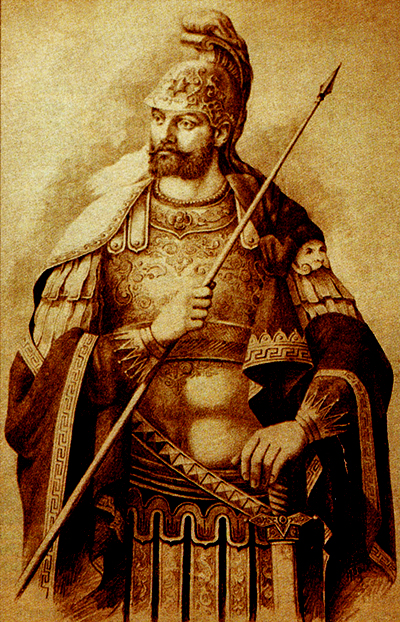
Constantine XI depicted in semi-classical armour.

Constantine XI was the Despot of the Morea before his ascension to the throne. From this position, he had continued the aggressive policies of his father and his brothers against the Ottomans and their vassals, the Duchy of Athens, but had been forced to back down by Murad II. In 1451, Mehmed II succeeded his father Murad. Upon his succession to the throne, he received a demand by Constantine XI for subsidies, coupled with a threat to rebel if these were not met. Mehmed II responded with these bold declarations by building a fortress on the European side of the Bosporus in order to better control traffic through the Bosporus.

Mehmed II assembled a huge army to assail Constantinople's landward walls — some sources suggest 80,000 soldiers, while others suggest figures as high as 100,000 or even 200,000, including camp followers. A major feature of the Ottoman army was its high-quality artillery. Among others, it featured a number of "super-cannons" built by Orban, a Hungarian engineer who had originally offered his services to Constantine, who rejected them for lack of money. After the rejection of terms of surrender by Constantine, the siege began on April 2, 1453, with Ottoman cannon firing from April 6. The defenders were few, but the mighty walls allowed them to withstand the siege for some time. Finally however, on May 29, the Ottomans achieved a breach, and the city fell. Constantine XI charged at the oncoming Ottoman army; the last Roman Emperor died fighting, and since his body was never recognized, is assumed to have been buried in a mass grave.

=== Conclusion ===
Constantine's rule is hard to assess due to the shortness of his reign. As a Despot, he had shown ability, but the fall of the Empire to the Turks was by his time inevitable, no matter how able and energetic an Emperor sat on the throne. What is most remembered of him is the stubborn defence of his city against the odds, and his death in battle, through which he entered popular legend. Despite his Catholic confession, he is viewed as a saint by many Orthodox, and many legends were created about the ultimate fate of the last Constantine.

== Learning under the Palaiologoi ==
=== Second Byzantine/Palaiologan Renaissance ===
Despite much chaos in the Empire, the Byzantines experienced a revival in culture and art within their domain. Towards the 14th century, as the Empire entered into a phase of terminal crisis, such achievements became less valued. All was not lost for these seemingly rejected scholars — many in Italy who had been opened up to Byzantium by the maritime expansions of Genoa and Venice came to appreciate their achievements, facilitating the Renaissance. As such these scholars found themselves in Italian institutions, expressing their Greco-Roman culture for pay. Immigration to Italy was made less attractive by the idea of abandoning the Orthodox faith to practice Catholicism. Nonetheless, a significant and increasing number of Greeks began travelling to Italy, first temporarily to Italian colonies such as Crete or Cyprus before returning to Byzantium, then as the Empire began to fail horribly, in more permanent manner. The Fall of Constantinople was marked by large numbers of Greek refugees escaping Turkic rule into Europe via Italy and thus accelerating the Renaissance.

=== Restoration of the Classics ===
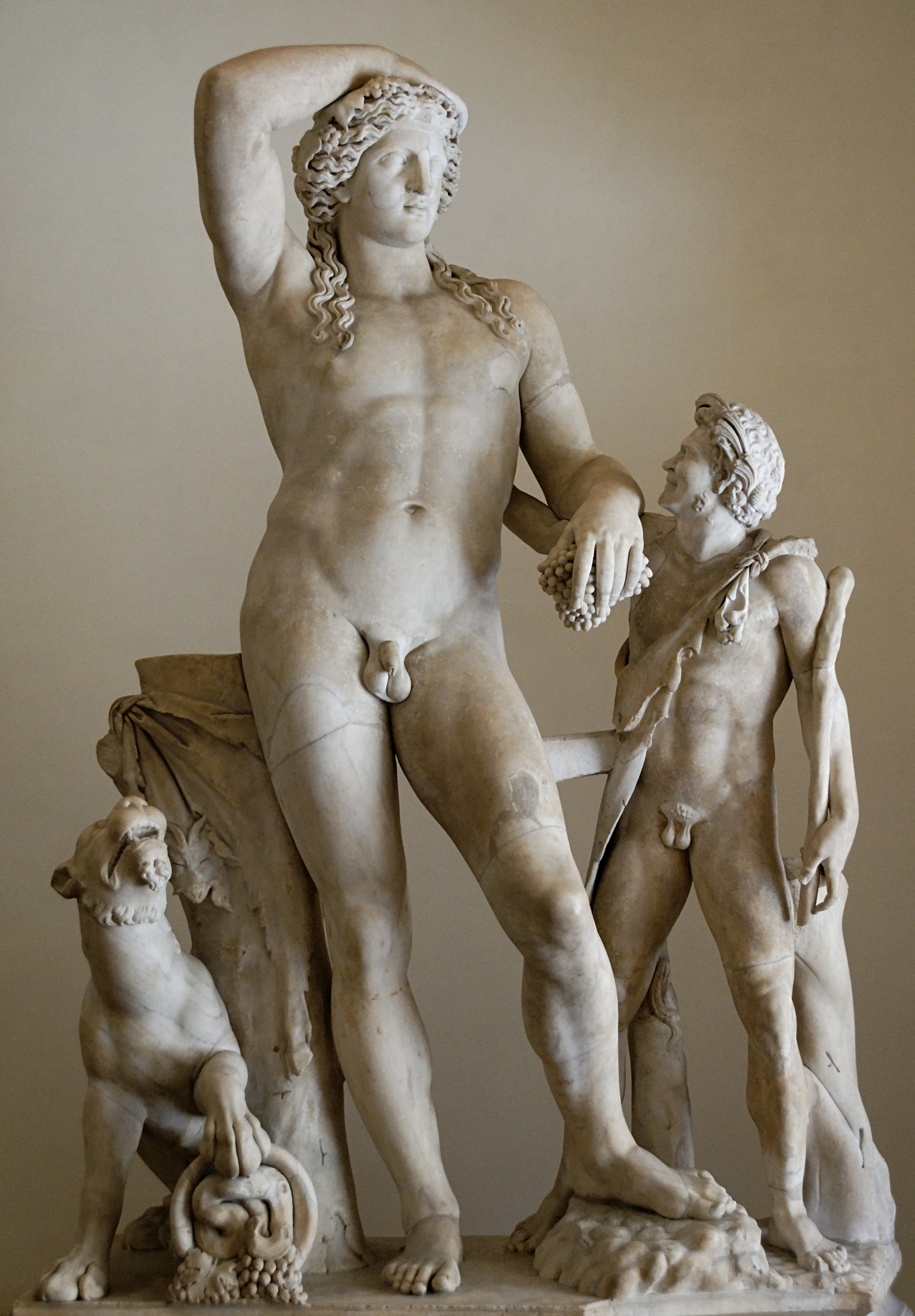
Classical literature that was studied included mythical figures such as Dionysus.

The Fourth Crusade saw the destruction of many homes in Constantinople and much of the city on fire. It is difficult to determine what books were burned in the libraries of Constantinople, though one can only imagine that few would be available today were it not for the works of Demetrius Triclinius, Manuel Moschopoulos, Thomas Magister and Maximos Planudes. New editions of poets, such as Hesiod and Pindar, were made and their metric systems were reconstructed with competence. They wrote about such works as Scholia and Pindar. Countless works are also included, such as the tragedians of Sophocles and Euripides, Ptolemy's Geography, Nonnus of Panaopolis' Dionysiaca, edits and "rediscoveries" on Plutarch and the Greek Anthology of epigrams. Works assembled by Theodore Metochites at the Monastery of Chora can be found in the libraries of Istanbul, Oxford, the Vatican and even Paris.

=== Greek Byzantium ===
In the past, at its full height, the Byzantine Empire was composed of many territories, stretching from modern-day Iraq to modern-day Spain. As the Empire's borders shrunk, so too had its cultural diversity. By the late 13th century, the Empire consisted almost exclusively of traditionally Greek territory (inhabited by Greeks since Antiquity). Consequently, this Greek culture soon came to dominate the Empire and the works of the Classical age such as those of Sophocles and Theocritus were meticulously copied and annotated.

Notable philosophers include Planudes who characterized the interest in Science and Mathematics at the time. Astronomy was also a field of interest, as Nicephorus Gregoras illustrates with his proposal to modify the calendar before changes were put in place by the Gregorian reform.

Moreover, some prominent personalities also proposed the change of the Imperial title to 'Emperor of the Hellenes', instead of Romans. This enthusiasm for the glorious past, contained elements that were also present in the movement that led to the creation of the modern Greek state, in 1830, after four centuries of Ottoman rule.

=== Persian science enters, circa 1300 ===
At the time, astrologists had to rely on Ptolemy's tables for calculations. However, these proved to be inaccurate when compared to Arab astronomy. As a result, Persian tables were used more often, even if in conjunction with Ptolemy's. The acceptance of Arab astronomy was made harder by the fact that it had to be translated, and only entered through "lowlier social channels", namely by men who travelled between Constantinople and Trebizond. Such men included Gregory Choniades and his follower George Chrysokokkes, who acquainted themselves with this science. By the mid-14th century, when Byzantium was overwhelmed with troubles, the tables of Ptolemy were deemed by professionals as inadequate and slowly abandoned for Persian tables.

Despite this, Persian works such as those on astrolabe were translated into Greek as early as 1309. In 1352, Theodore Metochites published his thoughts using Persian and Ptolemaic tables.

Such works, while being non-Christian and in many cases non-Hellenistic, were cultivated by the Greek Orthodox ecclesiastics. Both Choniades and Metochites established themselves in the Greek Orthodox Church; the former becoming Bishop of Tabriz and the latter the head of the Patriarchal school.

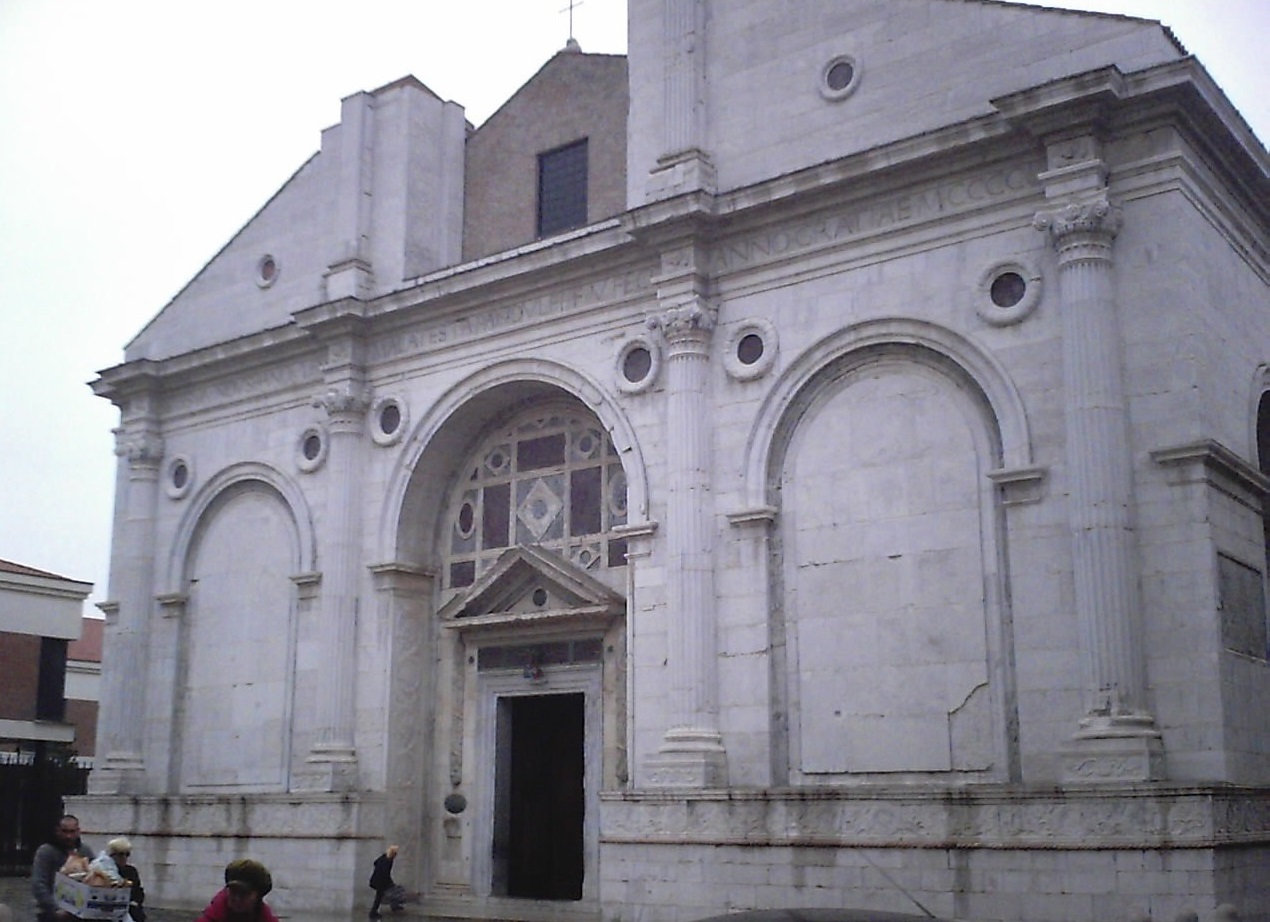
Plethon's final resting place was moved to the Tempio Malatestiano in Rimini, Italy by his Italian disciples.

Not all thinkers were welcome in Byzantium. Some who opened their minds to other beliefs would have strayed from the "one true Religion", as the Byzantines would have seen it. One such example is that of Plethon. His works on computational astronomy using Hebrew and Persian tables were overshadowed by the neo-pagan beliefs he adopted in his old age. He proclaimed his belief in the "Seven Wise Men", the message of Zoroaster and Fatalism. Consequently, his work on a modified Greek Pantheon, The Laws was burnt by the Patriarch of Constantinople. Plethon's ashes repose in the Tempio Malatestiano of Rimini.

Others went so far as to suggest that Byzantium would not live forever — a fundamental belief for every subject of the Byzantine Orthodox Church. Metochites did not see Byzantine civilization as superior to others and even considered the "infidel" Tatars as more enlightened in some aspects, such as morality, than his Christian co-religionists.

=== Patronage ===
Philosophers had to find ways of bringing food to the table. The most common occupation in the Byzantine Empire would have either been agriculturally based or, earlier in the Empire, trade-based. In contrast, philosophers needed patronage in order to survive. The most important source was from the Imperial court, especially before the destructive civil wars that were characterized by Andronikos III and his son John V. Other sources were from minor courts, from the wealthy, and from the Church, if not from individual Church clergy, although only bishops had such resources.

As the Empire descended into chaos, it could not spare any finances in its efforts to defend its borders. Study in the fields of science and mathematics naturally disappeared from the minds of those whose lands were raided and seized. It was due to this lack of patronage that led many scholars to flee to the West. Remarkable travels were recorded by John Argyropoulos and Manuel Chrysoloras, who between them had travelled to Florence, Pavia, Rome, Padua and Milan. The end of the Byzantine Empire coincided with the beginning of the Renaissance.

== See also ==
- Byzantium under the Angeloi
- Byzantium under the Doukids
- Byzantium under the Heraclian
- Byzantium under the Isaurians
- Byzantium under the Justinian Dynasty
- Byzantium under the Komnenoi
- Byzantium under the Macedonians
- Family tree of Byzantine emperors
- Kantakouzenos dynasty and related family tree

== Sources ==
- Madden, Thomas F. Crusades the Illustrated History. 1st ed. Ann Arbor: University of Michigan P, 2005
- Mango, Cyril. The Oxford History of Byzantium. 1st ed. New York: Oxford UP, 2002
- John Joseph Saunders, The History of the Mongol Conquests, (University of Pennsylvania Press, 1971), 79.
