= Theodore Metochites =

Byzantine Greek statesman, author and philosopher

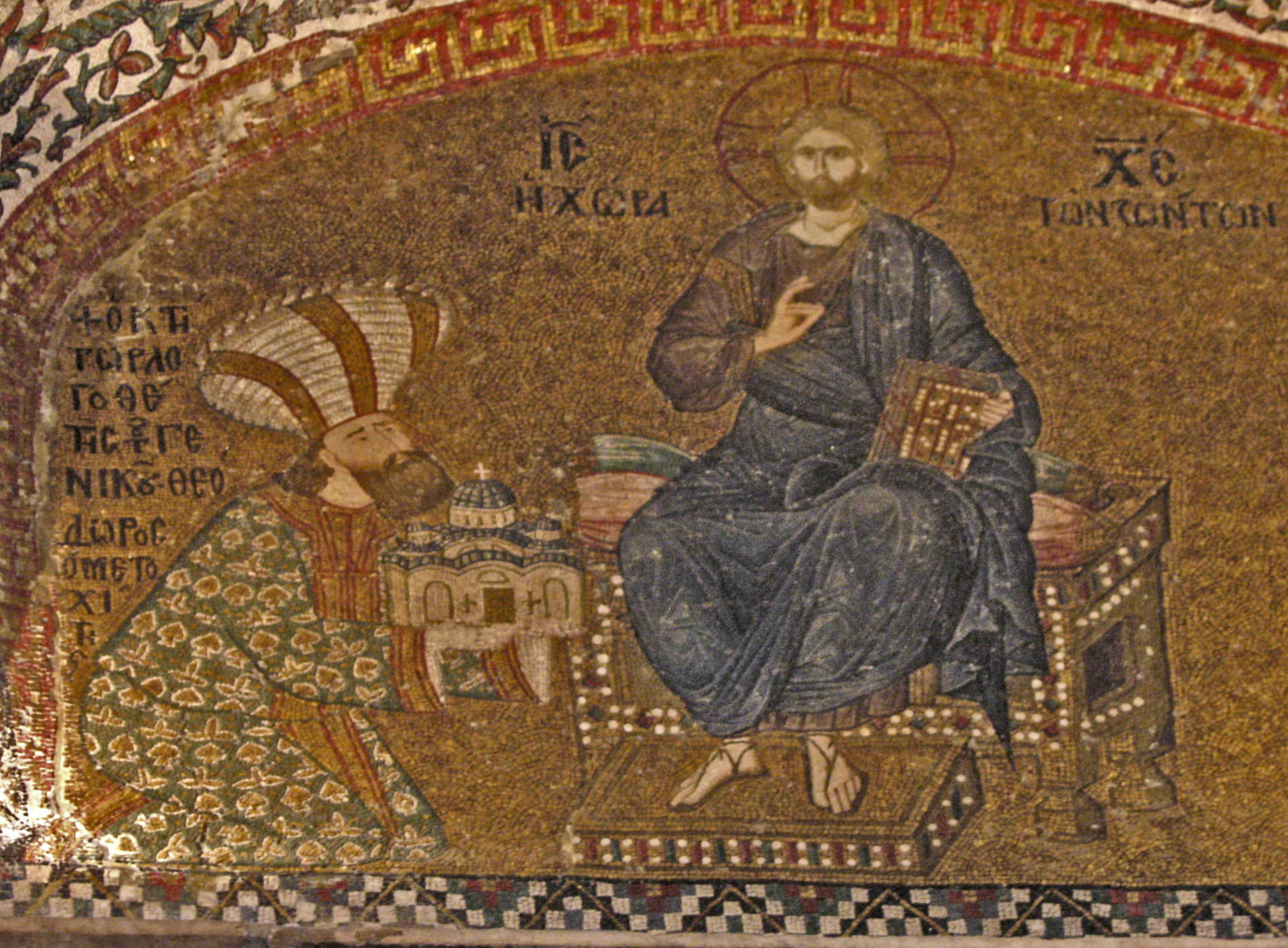
- The logothetes tou genikou Theodore Metochites presenting the model of the renovated Chora Church to Christ Pantocrator

Mesazōn of the Byzantine Empire
- In office 1305–1328
- Monarch: Andronikos II Palaiologos
- Preceded by: Nikephoros Choumnos
- Succeeded by: Alexios Apokaukos

Megas logothetes
- In office 1325–1328
- Monarch: Andronikos II Palaiologos
- Preceded by: Constantine Akropolites

Logothetes tou genikou
- In office 1305–1321
- Monarch: Andronikos II Palaiologos

Logothetes ton oikeiakon
- In office 1295/96–1305
- Monarch: Andronikos II Palaiologos

Logothetes ton agelon
- In office 1290–1295/96
- Monarch: Andronikos II Palaiologos

Personal details
- Born: 1270 Constantinople
- Died: 13 March 1332 (aged 61–62) Constantinople
- Parent: George Metochites (father)
- Scientific career
- Fields: Astronomy
- Academic advisors: Manuel Bryennios
- Notable students: Nikephoros Gregoras; Gregory Palamas

Theodore Metochites (Greek: Θεόδωρος Μετοχίτης; 1270–1332) was a Byzantine statesman, author, gentleman philosopher–astronomer, and patron of the arts. From c. 1305 to 1328 he held the position of personal adviser (mesazōn) to emperor Andronikos II Palaiologos.

== Life ==
Metochites was born in Constantinople as the son of the archdeacon George Metochites, a fervent supporter of the union of the Orthodox and Catholic Churches. After the Council of Blachernae in 1285, his father was condemned and exiled, and Metochites seems to have spent his adolescence in the monastic milieux of Bithynia in Asia Minor. He devoted himself to studies of both secular and religious authors. When Andronicus II visited Nicaea in 1290/91, Metochites made such an impression on him that he was immediately called to the court and made Logothete of the Herds. Little more than a year later, he was appointed a Senator. Besides carrying out his political duties (embassies to Cilicia in 1295 and to Serbia in 1299), Metochites continued to study and to write. In 1312/13, he started learning astronomy from Manuel Bryennios; later he himself became the teacher of Nicephorus Gregoras. He was married with five sons and one daughter, Irene (spouse of John Komnenos Palaiologos).

Metochites' political career culminated in 1321, when he was invested as Grand Logothete. He was then at the summit of his power, and also one of the richest men of his age. Some of the money was spent on restoring and decorating the church of the Chora monastery in the northwest of Constantinople, where Metochites' donor portrait can still be seen in a famous mosaic in the narthex, above the entrance to the nave.

Metochites' fortunes were, however, linked with his emperor's. After a few years of intermittent civil war, Andronicus II was overthrown in 1328 by his own grandson, Andronicus III Palaeologus. Metochites went down with him. He was deprived of his possessions and forced into exile in Didymoteichon. In 1330, he was allowed to return to Constantinople. He then withdrew to Chora, where he died on 13 March 1332, having adopted the monastic name Theoleptos.

== Works ==
Metochites' extant œuvre comprises 20 Poems in dactylic hexameter, 18 orations (Logoi), Commentaries on Aristotle's writings on natural philosophy, an introduction to the study of Ptolemaic astronomy (Stoicheiosis astronomike), and 120 essays on various subjects, the Semeioseis gnomikai. Many of these works are still unedited.

Editions with English translations

- Featherstone, J. M. 2000. Theodore Metochites’s Poems 'To Himself'. Introduction, Text, and Translation. Vienna. ISBN 3-7001-2853-3
  - Reviewed by Lazaris, S. 2002. "Jeffrey Michael Featherstone (Introduction, Text and Translation), Theodore Metochites’s poems 'to Himself' [Byzantina vindobonensia, XXIII], Wien : Verlag der Österreichischen Akademie der Wissenschaften, 2000", Scriptorium 56, p. 328*-330*()
- Hult, K. 2002. Theodore Metochites on Ancient Authors and Philosophy: Semeioseis gnomikai 1–26 & 71. A Critical Edition with Introduction, Translation, Notes, and Indexes. With a Contribution by B. Bydén. Studia Graeca et Latina Gothoburgensia 65. Gothenburg. ISBN 91-7346-434-1
- Hult, K. 2016. Theodore Metochites on the Human Condition and the Decline of Rome. Semeioseis gnomikai 27–60. A Critical Edition with Introduction, Translation, Notes, and Indexes. Studia Graeca et Latina Gothoburgensia 70. Gothenburg. ISBN 978-91-7346-889-3,
- Wahlgren, S. 2018. Theodore Metochites' Sententious Notes: Semeioseis gnomikai 61–70 & 72–81. A critical edition with introduction, translation, notes, and indexes.Studia Graeca et Latina Gothoburgensia 71. Gothenburg. ISBN 978-91-7346-993-7
- Xenophontos, S. 2020. On Morals or Concerning Education. Dumbarton Oaks Medieval Library 61. Cambridge, MA. ISBN 9780674244634

Editions without English translation

- Bydén, B. 2003. Theodore Metochites' Stoicheiosis astronomike and the study of natural philosophy and mathematics in early Palaiologan Byzantium. 2nd rev. ed. Acta Universitatis Gothoburgensis. Studia Graeca et Latina Gothoburgensia 66. Göteborg. ISBN 91-7346-459-7
- Clerc, Didier. 2024. Théodore Métochite, Comparaison de Démosthène et d'Aristide (Sapheneia, vol. 24). Basel: Schwabe.
- Polemis, I. D. 2015, Theodorus Metochita. Carmina (Corpus Christianorum. Series Graeca 83), Turnhout: Brepols Publishers, 2015. ISBN 978-2-503-56456-2
- Polemis, I. D. and E. Kaltsogianni. 2019. Orationes. Bibliotheca Scriptorum Graecorum et Romanorum Teubneriana 2031. Berlin. ISBN 978-3-11-044099-7
