= Logothetes ton agelon =

The logothetēs tōn agelōn (Greek: λογοθέτης τῶν ἀγελῶν), in English the Logothete of the Herds, was the Byzantine official responsible for the state-run estates (mētata) in western Asia Minor that reared horses and mules for the Byzantine army and the imperial Public Post.

== History and functions ==
The Byzantine office appears in the 9th century and is commonly accepted to be the evolution of the 4th-century Roman praepositus gregum et stabulorum, who was subordinate to the comes res privatae. Uniquely among the logothetai, the logothetēs tōn agelōn is listed among the high military officials (stratarchai) in the 899 Klētorologion of Philotheos, 40th in the hierarchy from the emperor, highlighting the office's close connection with the army. The importance of the office increased from the 10th century, reaching its zenith in the late 13th century, when it was held by several of the most important state officials.

== Subordinate officials ==
The subordinates of the logothetēs tōn agelōn were:

- The prōtonotarioi for Asia and Phrygia, where the mētata were apparently concentrated.
- The dioikētai of the mētata (διοικηταὶ τῶν μητάτων), the administrators of the horse farms and successors to the Roman procuratores saltuum.
- The episkeptētai ("inspectors") and komētes ("counts"), the latter of unclear function.

Sigillographic evidence also attests to the existence of chartoularioi and of an ek prosōpou ("representative") of the department.

== List of known logothetai tōn agelōn ==
Name	Tenure	Appointed by	Notes	Refs
Basil	8th/9th century	unknown	Known only from a seal mentioning "Basil, spatharios and logothetēs tōn agelōn"	
Anonymous	early 10th century	Leo VI the Wise or Constantine VII or Romanos I Lekapenos	Addressee of a letter of Patriarch Nicholas I of Constantinople.	
Basil	11th century	unknown	Known only from a seal mentioning "Basil, ek prosōpou of the logothetēs tōn agelōn, asekretis and imperial prōtospatharios"	
Hagiotheodorites	c. 1258	Theodore II Laskaris	Unknown first name. Mentioned during the brief period following the death of Theodore II Laskaris, when the regent George Mouzalon placed him in charge of the imperial treasury. After Michael VIII Palaiologos seized power, Hagiotheodorites was promoted to logothetēs tōn oikeiakōn.	
Pepagomenos	c. 1283/89	Andronikos II Palaiologos	Unknown first name. Known only as an addressee of a letter by Patriarch Gregory II of Constantinople.	
Theodore Metochites	c. 1294	Andronikos II Palaiologos	According to George Pachymeres, Metochites, the future megas logothetēs and chief minister of Andronikos II, held the post during an embassy to Cilicia in 1294.	
Phakrases	c. 1299/1300	Andronikos II Palaiologos	Addressee of letters by Maximos Planoudes (1299/1300) and Nikephoros Choumnos (c. 1315). Guilland equates him with a John Phakrases, who was a friend and addressee (before 1283) of Patriarch Gregory II of Constantinople, and suggests a possible identity with the namesake parakoimōmenos who was the author of a treatise on imperial titulature and offices. The Prosopographisches Lexikon der Palaiologenzeit on the other hand considers the logothetēs tōn agelōn as the father of the latter and the possible son of the former.	
Anonymous	late 13th/early 14th century	probably Andronikos II Palaiologos	Anonymous addressee of Manuel Philes	

== Sources ==
- Bury, J. B.; Philotheus (1911). The Imperial Administrative System of the Ninth Century (With a Revised Text of the Kletorologion of Philotheos). London: Oxford University Press.
- Guilland, Rodolphe (1971). "Les Logothètes: Etudes sur l'histoire administrative de l'Empire byzantin" [The Logothetes: Studies on the Administrative History of the Byzantine Empire]. Revue des études byzantines (in French). 29: 5–115. doi:10.3406/rebyz.1971.1441.
- Kazhdan, Alexander, ed. (1991). The Oxford Dictionary of Byzantium. Oxford and New York: Oxford University Press. ISBN 0-19-504652-8.
- Trapp, Erich; Beyer, Hans-Veit; Walther, Rainer; Sturm-Schnabl, Katja; Kislinger, Ewald; Leontiadis, Ioannis; Kaplaneres, Sokrates (1976–1996). Prosopographisches Lexikon der Palaiologenzeit (in German). Vienna: Verlag der Österreichischen Akademie der Wissenschaften. ISBN 3-7001-3003-1.
- Verpeaux, Jean, ed. (1966). Pseudo-Kodinos, Traité des Offices (in French). Centre National de la Recherche Scientifique.
