= Gregory Kamateros =

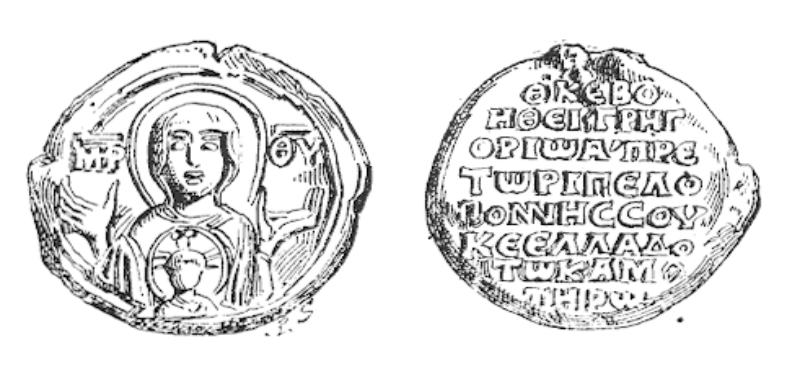
Seal of Kamateros as protopraetor of the themes of Hellas and the Peloponnese

Gregory Kamateros (Greek: Γρηγόριος Καματηρός, romanized: Grēgorios Kamatēros; fl. 1088 – c. 1126/32) was a senior Byzantine official. Of low birth but very well educated, he reached high office under Emperor Alexios I Komnenos and eventually became logothetes ton sekreton, de facto prime minister, under both Alexios and John II Komnenos. Through his marriage with Irene Doukaina, an imperial relative, he founded the bureaucratic dynasty of the Doukai–Kamateroi.

== Life and career ==
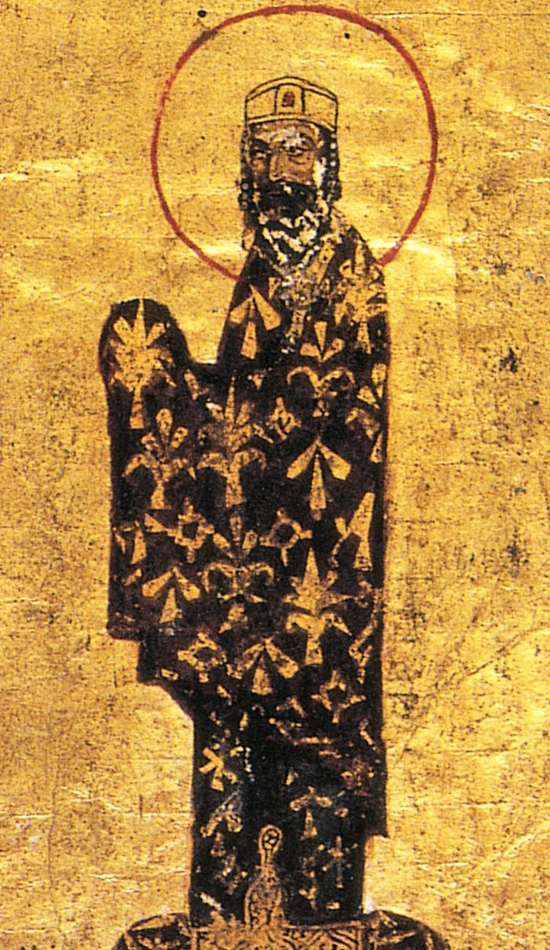
Miniature of the Emperor Alexios I Komnenos (r. 1081–1118).

There are several scattered references to a "Gregory Kamateros" in documents and seals of the late 11th/early 12th century. Most scholars consider them to refer to the same person, with the notable exception of the historian Vitalien Laurent, who cast doubt on this identification.

According to the historian Niketas Choniates, Gregory Kamateros was of lowly and undistinguished birth. Nevertheless, he was distinguished by his great erudition, which was said to encompass all fields of knowledge. He first appears in a document of the year 1088, as a logariastes (accountant) of the genikon department. The same document also gives the name of his father as Basil. At the time of the failed conspiracy of Nikephoros Diogenes against Alexios I Komnenos (r. 1081–1118) in 1094, he was a "recently appointed" secretary to the emperor, and participated in the interrogation of Diogenes.

A seal attests to his having held the office of governor, with the title of praetor, of the joint themes of the Peloponnese and Hellas. This is likely when, according to Choniates, he became rich from tax farming in the provinces. The wealth he accumulated allowed him to marry an imperial relative, Irene Doukaina. Archbishop Theophylact of Ohrid, who maintained friendly relations with Gregory and addressed five letters to him, implies that he was very influential at court; in a letter written c. 1094, Theophylact congratulates Gregory on his promotion to the rank of nobilissimus and the position of protasekretis.

The protasekretis was originally the head of the imperial chancery, but according to the historian Paul Magdalino, Gregory Kamateros may have been the first protasekretis to head the tribunal with which the office was chiefly associated later in the 12th century. Later, he was promoted to the rank of sebastos, and the position of logothetes ton sekreton. The latter post was a creation of Alexios I, originally tasked simply with coordinating the various government departments (sekreta), but which by the turn of the 12th century had established itself as a de facto prime minister. Indeed, the monody written on the occasion of Gregory's funeral by the court poet Theodore Prodromos portrays him as the virtual ruler of the empire.

After the accession of John II Komnenos (r. 1118–1143), it appears that Gregory was sidelined for a while, as the government was headed by John's favourites, the parakoimomenos John Komnenos and the protovestiarios Gregory Taronites. As the latter proved ineffective, Gregory Kamateros was recalled, but, as Magdalino remarks, probably not "in his full former capacity"; not only did he have to share the responsibility of government with the parakoimomenos, but the megas domestikos John Axouch now dominated the court.

Towards the end of his life, both he and his wife Irene entered a monastery. The exact date of Gregory's death is unknown, but it is placed between 1126 and 1132 on account of a reference to the appearance of a comet in Prodromos' funeral monody. Another court poet, Nicholas Kallikles, also wrote a poem on the occasion of Gregory's death.

== Family ==
Gregory Kamateros married Irene Doukaina, probably a daughter of the protostrator Michael Doukas and hence niece-in-law of Alexios I. Irene Doukaina outlived her husband, but her date of death is unknown. The union led to the emergence of the Doukas-Kamateros line, which held high office under the Komnenian emperors throughout the 12th century. Most of the couple's children are unknown. A son named Michael died young, and a contemporary Theodore Kamateros was also likely a son of the couple. The best known of Gregory's children are the high official John Kamateros, and the high official and theologian Andronikos Kamateros. The latter's son Basil Doukas Kamateros was also a high official, while his daughter Euphrosyne Doukaina Kamatera became empress to Alexios III Angelos (r. 1195–1203).

== Sources ==
- Guilland, Rodolphe (1971). "Les Logothètes: Etudes sur l'histoire administrative de l'Empire byzantin". Revue des études byzantines (in French). 29: 5–115. doi:10.3406/rebyz.1971.1441.
- Kazhdan, Alexander, ed. (1991). The Oxford Dictionary of Byzantium. Oxford and New York: Oxford University Press. ISBN 0-19-504652-8.
- Magdalino, Paul (2002) [1993]. The Empire of Manuel I Komnenos, 1143–1180 (Second ed.). Cambridge: Cambridge University Press. ISBN 9780521526531.
- Polemis, Demetrios I. (1968). The Doukai: A Contribution to Byzantine Prosopography. London: The Athlone Press.
- Shandrovskaya, Valentina Samoilovna (1959). "Григорий Каматир и его печать в собрании Государственного Эрмитажа" [Gregory Kamateros and his seal in the collection of the State Hermitage Museum] (PDF). Византийский Временник (in Russian). 16 (41). Российской Академии Наук: 173–182.
- Skoulatos, Basile (1980). Les personnages byzantins de l'Alexiade: Analyse prosopographique et synthèse [The Byzantine Personalities of the Alexiad: Prosopographical Analysis and Synthesis] (in French). Louvain-la-Neuve and Louvain: Bureau du Recueil Collège Érasme and Éditions Nauwelaerts.
