= Kamateros =

The Kamateros family (Greek: Καματηρός, pl. Kamateroi Greek: Καματηροί; Latinized respectively Camaterus, Camateri), was a Byzantine family of functionaries from Constantinople that became prominent in the 10th–12th centuries. Several family members were scholars and literary patrons. The feminine form of the name is Kamatera (Greek: Καματηρά).

The first attested member of the family is the spatharokandidatos Petronas Kamateros, who in c. 839 supervised the construction of the Sarkel fortress for the Khazars and later became governor of Cherson. Several members of the family are attested in the 10th and 11th centuries as fiscal or judicial officials, and Gregory Kamateros became protasekretis and later logothetes ton sekreton to Emperor Alexios I Komnenos (r. 1081–1118).

The family reached its peak in the 12th century, under Manuel I Komnenos (r. 1143–1180) and the Angelos emperors. John Kamateros enjoyed the favour of Manuel I and was logothetes tou dromou in the late 1150s. The sebastos Andronikos Kamateros became eparch of Constantinople and droungarios of the Vigla, and was also a theologian of note. His son Basil was logothetes tou dromou under Isaac II Angelos (r. 1185–1195, 1203–1204), while his daughter Euphrosyne Doukaina Kamatera married emperor Alexios III Angelos (r. 1195–1203).

The family also produced two ecumenical patriarchs of Constantinople, Basil II (1183–1186) and John X (1198–1206). At the same time, John V Kamateros was archbishop of Bulgaria after 1186. Another John Kamateros, possibly identical with John V, was the author of two astrological works.

== Sources ==
- Kazhdan, Alexander, ed. (1991). The Oxford Dictionary of Byzantium. Oxford and New York: Oxford University Press. ISBN 0-19-504652-8.
