= John Kamateros (logothetes tou dromou) =

Senior official under Emperor Manuel I Komnenos

John Kamateros (Greek: Ἰωάννης Καματηρός, romanized: Iōánnēs Kamatēros) was a 12th-century Byzantine aristocrat and official.

== Family ==
John was the son of Gregory Kamateros, a man of humble origin but well educated, who held several senior government posts under emperors Alexios I Komnenos and John II Komnenos and advanced to the high rank of sebastos, and of Irene Doukaina, probably a daughter of the protostrator Michael Doukas, whose sister Irene was wed to Alexios I. The union led to the emergence of the Doukas–Kamateros bureaucratic dynasty, which would reach the peak of its fortunes with John and his brother, Andronikos Doukas Kamateros, who occupied the highest offices in the state. It is possible that John is the unnamed logothetes whose daughter was the wife of Alexios Kontostephanos.

== Career ==
John Kamateros enjoyed imperial favour as Manuel I Komnenos' drinking companion; according to the near-contemporary historian Niketas Choniates, Kamateros drank wine by the barrel and was able to outdrink any foreign envoy or ruler, while he was a famous glutton as well, eating as if he was starving and able to eradicate entire fields of green peas by himself.

Choniates gives an account of Kamateros' rivalry with the epi tou kanikleiou (keeper of the imperial inkstand), Theodore Styppeiotes, who was deposed and blinded at Manuel's orders in 1158/9. According to Choniates, Kamateros resented the fact that, although formally less powerful than himself, who was logothetes tou dromou, Styppeiotes' office allowed him immediate access to and therefore influence on the emperor. Consequently, Styppeiotes managed to have his own ideas promoted, while Kamateros "saw his demands dispersed in the air like dreams". Frustrated, John forged a correspondence between Styppeiotes and the Norman king of Sicily, William II (r. 1166–1189), which he hid so that it could be discovered easily. Styppeiotes was then charged with treason, lost his offices, was blinded and his tongue was severed. Other authors give different reasons for Styppeiotes' downfall, and the details of Choniates' version have been proven to be inaccurate, at least in their chronology, by the historian Otto Kresten. Nevertheless, as Choniates was a member of the Constantinopolitan bureaucracy and well-informed about its recent history, it is very likely that his information that Kamateros succeeded Styppeiotes as mesazon (chief minister), before being replaced as both logothetes tou dromou and mesazon by Michael Hagiotheodorites, is correct.

As a prominent member of the court, John was also active in the intellectual circles of the time, apparently having himself composed at least two poems in political verse, and corresponding with scholars like Michael Glykas and George Tornikes. John was not a very religious man, and was interested in astrology, the subject of one of his poems.

== Identification ==
The Greek Byzantinist Demetrios Polemis reconstructed Kamateros as "John Doukas Kamateros", who was "almost always called Doukas", identifying him with a number of persons named "John Doukas" or "John Kamateros", and giving him a high lineage as a cousin of Emperor Manuel I Komnenos. Polemis gave him a military, diplomatic, and civilian career that spanned almost the entire second half of the century, and led him to occupy, according to Polemis' assessment, "perhaps the most outstanding place among officials of his time".

However, these identifications have been disputed by other scholars. Patricia Karlin-Hayter notably decomposes Polemis' figure into six or seven different people. The military and diplomatic career envisaged by Polemis is now considered to belong to another figure, the megas hetaireiarches John Doukas.

== Sources ==
- Karlin-Hayter, Patricia (1972). "99. Jean Doukas". Byzantion (in French). 42 (1): 259–266. JSTOR 44170347.
- Kazhdan, A. P. (1969). "John Doukas – an attempt at de-identification". Le Parole e le Idee. 11: 242–247.
- Kazhdan, A. P.; Epstein, Ann Wharton (1985). Change in Byzantine Culture in the Eleventh and Twelfth Centuries. Berkeley and Los Angeles: University of California Press. ISBN 0-520-05129-7.
- Kazhdan, Alexander, ed. (1991). The Oxford Dictionary of Byzantium. Oxford and New York: Oxford University Press. ISBN 0-19-504652-8.
- Magdalino, Paul (2002) [1993]. The Empire of Manuel I Komnenos, 1143–1180 (Second ed.). Cambridge: Cambridge University Press. ISBN 9780521526531.
- Polemis, Demetrios I. (1968). The Doukai: A Contribution to Byzantine Prosopography. London: The Athlone Press.
- Stone, Andrew F. (1999). "The 'Grand Hetaireiarch' John Doukas: The Career of a Twelfth-Century Soldier and Diplomat". Byzantion. 69 (1): 145–164. JSTOR 44172159.
