= Constantine Mesopotamites =

Byzantine official from 1193 to 1197

Constantine Mesopotamites (Greek: Κωνσταντῖνος Μεσοποταμίτης) was a senior Byzantine official, and de facto chief minister under the emperors Isaac II Angelos and Alexios III Angelos from 1193 until his fall in summer 1197. He was also archbishop of Thessalonica from c. 1197 until c. 1227, but was in exile between 1204 and 1224, when the city was occupied by Latin Crusaders. Restored to his see, he refused to crown Theodore Komnenos Doukas as emperor, and departed his see again in self-exile. He was also a colleague and correspondent of the historian Niketas Choniates, and may have commissioned some of the latter's works.

== Life ==
Constantine's family, the Mesopotamitai, appeared in the late 11th century, and originated either from Mesopotamos (in modern Albania) or some place called Mesopotamia. One of his early assignments in the public service was as ambassador to the Republic of Genoa in c. 1189, to negotiate a treaty. When Mesopotamites returned with his Genoese counterpart, Simone Bufferio, to Constantinople in order to ratify the treaty, however, it was discovered that he had overstepped his brief, leading to a temporary collapse in negotiations.

=== Career under Isaac II ===
In 1193, despite his extreme youth—his colleague and historian Niketas Choniates refers to him derisively as a "small boy [...] less than a year after he had put down pen and ink [i.e. left school]"—he was chosen by Emperor Isaac II Angelos (r. 1185–1195) to succeed his maternal uncle and chief minister, Theodore Kastamonites, when the latter suffered a stroke and died soon after. Holding the rank of epi tou kanikleiou (keeper of the imperial inkstand), he quickly succeeded in placing Isaac entirely under his influence. According to Choniates he exercised power greater than that even of his predecessor, while historian Charles Brand credits him with "combining craft and guile with real ability in the management of affairs". During this period, Mesopotamites was also the recipient of a eulogy by Nikephoros Chrysoberges.

Mesopotamites' hold over the administration was secured by effectively isolating the emperor from public affairs, including ending Isaac's predilection for personally leading campaigns. Like Kastamonites, he was particularly successful in excluding the court and the nobility from power. As a result, he was greatly hated by the aristocracy, who plotted against Isaac. In the event, this resentment found an outlet in Isaac's elder brother, Alexios III Angelos (r. 1195–1203), who in April 1195 with the support of the aristocracy seized the throne while Isaac was hunting. Isaac was captured and blinded, being confined thereafter in a palace near the Golden Horn.

=== Career under Alexios III ===
Among the first acts of the new emperor was the dismissal of Mesopotamites, but as the new regime quickly degenerated into a wholesale plundering of the state coffers and the open sale of offices, Empress Euphrosyne Doukaina Kamatera intervened with her husband and secured his reinstatement, probably in late 1195. Returning to his old office of epi tou kanikleiou, Mesopotamites soon enjoyed as dominant a position under Alexios as he had under Isaac: the aristocratic courtiers, including the emperor's son-in-law Andronikos Kontostephanos and the empress' brother Basil Kamateros, lost power, while Mesopotamites became in Alexios' eyes "the horn of plenty, the mixing-bowl of virtues". Choniates' account suggests that he was indeed successful in improving administration during his renewed ascendancy.

Unable to attack him directly, in summer 1196 Kamateros and Kontostephanos accused the empress of infidelity with a certain Vatatzes, an adopted son of Alexios III. The emperor ordered Vatatzes executed, and two months later the empress was banished to a monastery at Nematarea. Her exile proved unpopular with the populace, and her relatives and supporters, Mesopotamites foremost, secured her pardon after six months, in March 1197. She quickly restored her influence over her husband, and alongside her Mesopotamites now stood at the summit of his power. According to Choniates, Mesopotamites now considered the title of epi tou kanikleiou insufficient, and sought to be elevated from the ecclesiastical rank of lector to deacon. This was granted, with Patriarch George Xiphilinos himself performing the ceremony. In addition, Mesopotamites was granted precedence among all other deacons, and a special dispensation was given for Mesopotamites to continue serving in the civil administration, as this was not normally allowed to ecclesiastics.

Mesopotamites' position was now supreme. As Choniates writes, he endeavoured to hold "the church in his left hand and [...] the palace with his right". His new ecclesiastic duties requiring him to leave the emperor's presence, he tried to secure his place by installing his two brothers in the palace to keep his rivals away from Alexios. However, as Choniates points out, he had now risen so high that he could only fall. Shortly after his elevation to the deaconate, he was promoted further to archbishop of Thessalonica. Mesopotamites left Constantinople for Thessalonica only long enough for his consecration there, but his enemies at court seized the chance offered by his absence. Led by the megas doux Michael Stryphnos, Mesopotamites' main rival due to his rampant corruption and embezzlement of public funds, they persuaded Alexios to dismiss him from all civil offices. His brothers were dismissed as well, and his post of epi tou kanikleiou went to Theodore Eirenikos. The Patriarch quickly also brought accusations against him before a synod—manifestly unjust, feeble, and unsubstantial, according to Choniates—and he was also dismissed from his ecclesiastical offices. Thessalonica was taken over by John Chrysanthos, but Mesopotamites was soon reinstated in his see, where he remained until ousted by the Fourth Crusade in 1204.

=== Later life ===
During his exile, he was captured by pirates before finding refuge (c. 1206/7) in the state of Epirus that had been founded by Michael I Komnenos Doukas. He was restored to his see after Thessalonica was recovered by Theodore Komnenos Doukas in 1224. When Theodore requested to be crowned emperor, however, Mesopotamites refused, out of loyalty to the exiled Patriarchate in the Empire of Nicaea, and left his see in self-exile. Theodore was eventually crowned by the Archbishop of Ohrid, Demetrios Chomatenos, sometime in April–August 1227. Mesopotamites must have abandoned his see by then. The see appears to have remained vacant for some time thereafter, until sometime after 1230, when a Bulgarian bishop, possibly called Michael Pratanos, was installed as a result of the Bulgarian hegemony over the rump Empire of Thessalonica following Theodore's defeat and capture at the Battle of Klokotnitsa.

Mesopotamites also maintained a correspondence with Choniates after 1204. From their letters as well as the mentions of Mesopotamites in Choniates' History, it appears that they had a close relationship, and that Mesopotamites was one of Choniates' sources for his historical work. Indeed, Mesopotamites was the owner of Choniates' Dogmatic Panoply and the apparent recipient of the early version of his History, which explains why he is rarely mentioned by name, and why the harsh criticism of the later versions is missing.

== Sources ==
- Angold, Michael (2000). Church and Society in Byzantium under the Comneni, 1081-1261. Cambridge: Cambridge University Press. ISBN 0-521-26986-5.
- Brand, Charles M. (1968). Byzantium Confronts the West, 1180–1204. Cambridge, Massachusetts: Harvard University Press. LCCN 67-20872.
- Bredenkamp, François (1996). The Byzantine Empire of Thessaloniki (1224–1242). Thessaloniki: Thessaloniki History Center. ISBN 9608433177.
- Garland, Linda (1999). Byzantine Empresses: Women and Power in Byzantium AD 527–1204. Routledge. ISBN 978-0-415-14688-3.
- Kazhdan, Alexander, ed. (1991). The Oxford Dictionary of Byzantium. Oxford and New York: Oxford University Press. ISBN 0-19-504652-8.
- Magoulias, Harry J., ed. (1984). O City of Byzantium: Annals of Niketas Choniatēs. Detroit: Wayne State University Press. ISBN 978-0-8143-1764-8.
- Simpson, Alicia (2013). Niketas Choniates: A Historiographical Study. Oxford University Press. ISBN 978-0-19-967071-0.
