= Andronikos Kamateros =

Byzantine official and theologian

Andronikos Doukas Kamateros (Greek: Ἀνδρόνικος Δούκας Καματηρός) (Note: Most often simply called by the second surname alone.) was a Byzantine aristocrat, senior official under Emperor Manuel I Komnenos, and theologian, best known for his theological treatise Sacred Arsenal.

== Family and career ==
Born probably around 1110, Andronikos Kamateros was the son of Gregory Kamateros, a man of humble origin but well educated, who held several senior government posts under emperors Alexios I Komnenos and John II Komnenos and advanced to the high rank of sebastos, and of Irene Doukaina, probably a daughter of the protostrator Michael Doukas, whose sister Irene was wed to Alexios I. Andronikos had several siblings, but with the exception of a brother Michael, who died young, and possibly another brother named Theodore, on whose death John Tzetzes composed an epitaph, they are mostly unknown. The sebastos and logothetes tou dromou John Kamateros (logothetes tou dromou) was probably also his brother, rather than his son, as Polemis regards him. With Andronikos and John, the Kamateros family reached the peak of its influence.

His relationship to the ruling Komnenian dynasty—from his mother's side, Andronikos was second cousin to Emperor Manuel I Komnenos (r. 1143–80)—ensured his rise to prominence. Andronikos was awarded the high rank of sebastos, and by the mid-1150s, Andronikos held the relatively senior post of epi ton deeseon, in charge of petitions. He then advanced to the post of eparchos of Constantinople (1157–61) and finally to megas droungarios tes viglas (1166–76), two of the highest judicial offices in the Empire. In 1161, he participated in an embassy that went to the Principality of Antioch to escort Manuel I's second wife, Maria of Antioch, to Constantinople. A skilled theologian, he played a prominent role in Manuel's dealings with the Church; not only did he edit Manuel's theological discussions as part of his Sacred Arsenal (see below), but in 1173 Manuel entrusted him with the enforcement of an imperial decree regarding absentee bishops, and elsewhere is seen introducing the abbot of the Monastery of Patmos to Manuel. The time of his death is unknown, but was probably around 1180.

Andronikos Kamateros was married and had several children, of whom Basil also rose to high office. Of his two known daughters, Theodora married the megas doux Michael Stryphnos, while Euphrosyne married the future Alexios III Angelos (r. 1195–1203).

== Writings ==
Andronikos Kamateros was well educated and had relations with most of the prominent literati of his day: poems were dedicated to him by Theodore Prodromos and Gregory Antiochos, and he corresponded with George Tornikes, Euthymios Malakes, Theodore Balsamon, and John Tzetzes, with whom he appears to have been "on intimate terms" (Polemis).

Kamateros wrote an epigram on the procession of the Holy Spirit, but is best remembered for his Sacred Arsenal (Ἱερὰ Ὁπλοθήκη, Hiera Hoplothēkē), an "extensive dogmatic and theological exposition on various heresies", modelled on the Dogmatic Panoply of Euthymios Zigabenos but expanded to include tracts against the teachings of the Roman Catholic Church and the Armenian Church. The work was commissioned by Emperor Manuel, and its two parts mainly consist of what Kamateros claims to be verbatim transcripts of theological disputations held by Manuel I with Catholic and Armenian envoys at Constantinople. Based on this information, the composition of the work can be dated to the period 1172–74. The Sacred Arsenal quickly acquired popularity as the "most important book that an Orthodox theologian could read in order to face the Roman Church" (Bucossi), and was held in high esteem for this purpose up to the 15th century. Following the Council of Lyon in 1274, the pro-Unionist Patriarch John XI Bekkos composed a refutation of its theological arguments, but nevertheless praised its language and style.

The work survives in two manuscripts, the 13th-century Monacensis graecus 229, now in Munich, and the 14th-century Venetus Marcianus graecus 158 in the Marcian Library, Venice, which belonged to Cardinal Bessarion. At least eight other manuscripts contain parts of the first half. A full critical edition of the work has not yet been published; the first part, against the Catholic Church, was published by Alessandra Bucossi as Andronicus Camaterus. Sacrum Armamentarium, Pars prima (Corpus Christianorum Series Graeca 75) Brepols, Turnhout 2014. ISBN 978-2-503-54410-6.

== Sources ==
- Bucossi, Alessandra (2009). "New historical evidence for the dating of the Sacred Arsenal by Andronikos Kamateros". Revue des études byzantines. 67: 111–130. doi:10.3406/rebyz.2009.4826. hdl:10278/39978.
- Guilland, Rodolphe (1967). "Le Drongaire et le Grand drongaire de la Veille". Recherches sur les institutions byzantines, Tome I (in French). Berlin: Akademie-Verlag. pp. 563–587.
- Kazhdan, A. (1991). "Kamateros". In Kazhdan, Alexander (ed.). The Oxford Dictionary of Byzantium. Oxford and New York: Oxford University Press. ISBN 0-19-504652-8.
- Magdalino, Paul (1993). The Empire of Manuel I Komnenos, 1143–1180. Cambridge: Cambridge University Press. ISBN 0-521-52653-1.
- Polemis, Demetrios I. (1968). The Doukai: A Contribution to Byzantine Prosopography. London: The Athlone Press.
