= Theodore Styppeiotes =

Theodore Styppeiotes or Stypeiotes (Greek: Θεόδωρος Στυπ[π]ειώτης, romanized: Theodōros Styp[p]eiōtēs; c. 1110/1120 – after 1158/59) was a high-ranking bureaucrat of the Byzantine Empire and a member of the court of Emperor Manuel I Komnenos (r. 1143–1180). A well-educated and capable man, he advanced rapidly in the imperial hierarchy from imperial secretary (grammatikos) to the influential post of kanikleios, keeper of the imperial inkstand. In c. 1150 he engineered the downfall of John Hagiotheodorites, and succeeded him as mesazon, the de facto chief minister of the Empire. He long enjoyed the favour and trust of Manuel, who even wed him with his niece Eudokia. However, in 1158/59, Styppeiotes abruptly fell from power and was imprisoned and blinded. The sources provide different reasons, from Styppeiotes conspiring to deprive the Emperor of power to the machinations of his rival, John Kamateros, and scholars still dispute the true background of this event.

== Life ==
The origin and early life of Theodore Styppeiotes are unknown. From references in the poems of Theodore Prodromos, he was possibly born in c. 1110/1120, and likely descended from a relatively wealthy family. His relation to the earlier Sty[p]peiotai of the 10th and 11th centuries is unclear, but he may be related—possibly a grandson, according to Konstantinos Varzos—to the military commander Michael Stypeiotes, who served under Alexios I Komnenos (r. 1081–1118). In his youth, Styppeiotes received an extensive education, with the court poet Theodore Prodromos among his teachers. The relationship between Styppeiotes and Prodromos was close; in a poem written after his pupil's spectacular rise to power, Prodromos lauds him as "the best of grammarians and students and friends", and for his trustworthiness as a scribe in guarding secrets.

=== Rise to power ===
Following the completion of his education, at a relatively young age, he was given a posting as the Emperor's grammatikos or secretary in the imperial chancery, a position that required highly educated and skilled men, who were responsible, among other duties, for the elaborate preface (prooimion) attached to imperial edicts and charters. Styppeiotes rapidly rose in the imperial court, becoming the assistant of the then chief minister (mesazon), John Hagiotheodorites. He then exploited a quarrel between two aristocrats, Michael Palaiologos and Joseph Balsamon, the brother-in-law of Hagiotheodorites, to dispose of the latter. At Styppeiotes' instigation, Hagiotheodorites was appointed as the civil governor (praetor) of the joint theme of Hellas and the Peloponnese and sent to deal with the quarrel.

With his superior removed, Styppeiotes continued his ascent, reaching the position of kanikleios, guardian of the imperial inkstand, in 1150/51. This position, due to the close proximity to the emperor it afforded, made Styppeiotes extremely influential. Styppeiotes amassed other lofty titles and offices: in the protocols of a synod in May 1157 he is listed as a protonotarios, and in November 1158 as a dikaiodotes. Standing high in Manuel's favour, Styppeiotes became the effective mesazon, head of the civil administration. According to the near-contemporary official and historian, Niketas Choniates, thenceforth Styppeiotes "administered public affairs as he wished, profoundly wise, prudent, pleasant in manner, and soaring in political judgment. He agreed to whatever the emperor commanded and commanded whatever the emperor wished." So powerful was his position, that he could "move all things by merely pointing his finger and nodding", and his every wish became reality. His power is eloquently evoked in the poems addressed to him by Prodromos, and in a flattering letter sent in 1155 by the Metropolitan of Ephesus, George Tornikes, seeking his support.

In c. 1158, Emperor Manuel gave his trusted minister the hand of his niece Eudokia (born c. 1142), who had been left an orphan some time previously. The couple had a number of children, but only the name of one of them, Manuel—probably the firstborn—is known from a series of poems and dedications to his "miraculous" survival from a fall during infancy.

=== Downfall ===
In 1158/59, however, while on campaign in Cilicia, Manuel ordered Styppeiotes to be arrested and blinded. The reasons for this act are unclear, with different reasons being given by contemporary authors. According to John Kinnamos he publicly announced some kind of prophecy according to which Manuel would die soon, and that "the Roman senate should no longer grant power to a strapping young man, but to a man of properly advanced years, in order that under him, ruling by the letter [or by learning] the affairs of state might be managed as in a democracy". The German chronicler Rahewin, on the other hand, reports that the kanikleios had hired three men to assassinate Manuel, but that the empress discovered the plot and informed the emperor.

Choniates gives a rather different account, which according to the historian Paul Magdalino may represent the "unofficial" version of the affair, but the details of which were proven to be mostly fictitious by the Byzantinist Otto Kresten. According to Choniates, Styppeiotes' downfall was the result of his rivalry with John Kamateros, the logothetes tou dromou, who became frustrated with the special relationship between Styppeiotes and the emperor; Styppeiotes's goals were being fulfilled through his constant ties to Manuel while Kamateros's limited access to the emperor resulted in his demands never being met. Kamateros therefore forged a correspondence between Styppeiotes and the Norman king of Sicily, William II (r. 1166–1189), which he hid so that it could be discovered easily. Styppeiotes was ultimately charged with treason by Kamateros, resulting in Emperor Manuel having Styppeiotes blinded and his tongue severed.

Styppeiotes' downfall coincided with the blinding of Michael Glykas and the escape of the emperor's cousin and future emperor Andronikos I Komnenos (r. 1183–1185), and although the Byzantine sources make no explicit connection, it is very likely connected to both events. As a result it may indicate, according to Magdalino, both the existence of a faction at court which desired a return to a more consensus-based mode of ruling, with the emperor consulting with the Senate as was the practice before the rise of the Komnenoi, as well as of a pro-Sicilian faction opposed to Manuel's pro-German stance, manifested in his alliance with the Hohenstaufen and reinforced by his empress, Bertha of Sulzbach.

The fate of Styppeiotes after his dismissal, as those of his wife and children, are unknown.

== Sources ==
- Brand, Charles M., ed. (1976). Deeds of John and Manuel Comnenus, by John Kinnamos. New York: Columbia University Press. ISBN 0-231-04080-6.
- Choniates, Nicetas (1984). O City of Byzantium, Annals of Niketas Choniatēs. Translated by Harry J. Magoulias. Detroit: Wayne State University Press. ISBN 0-8143-1764-2.
- Kazhdan, A. P.; Epstein, Annabel Wharton (1985). Change in Byzantine Culture in the Eleventh and Twelfth Centuries. Berkeley and Los Angeles: University of California Press. ISBN 978-0-52-005129-4.
- Kresten, Otto (1978). "Zum Sturz des Theodoros Styppeiotes" [On the Downfall of Theodore Styppeiotes]. Jahrbuch der Österreichischen Byzantinistik (in German). 27: 49–103.
- Magdalino, Paul (1991). Tradition and Transformation in Medieval Byzantium. Aldershot: Variorum. ISBN 0-86078-295-6.
- Magdalino, Paul (2002) [1993]. The Empire of Manuel I Komnenos, 1143–1180 (Second ed.). Cambridge: Cambridge University Press. ISBN 9780521526531.
- Simpson, Alicia (2013). Niketas Choniates: A Historiographical Study. Oxford University Press. ISBN 978-0-19-967071-0.
- Varzos, Konstantinos (1984). Η Γενεαλογία των Κομνηνών [The Genealogy of the Komnenoi] (PDF) (in Greek). Vol. B. Thessaloniki: Centre for Byzantine Studies, University of Thessaloniki.
