= John Belissariotes =

Senior Byzantine official of late 12th century

John Belissariotes (Greek: Ἰωάννης Βελισσαριώτης) was a senior Byzantine official of the late 12th century.

John and his brother Michael were the childhood classmates and closest friends of the official and historian Niketas Choniates, and his brother, the future Metropolitan of Athens Michael Choniates. So close was the friendship between them that Niketas Choniates calls the Belissariotes brothers his brothers in soul and praises their goodness and nobleness. Eventually Choniates married their sister in c. 1185/86, and records that his mother-in-law was like a second mother to him.

John Belissariotes is mentioned in a letter of Michael Choniates dating to 1194/95 as holding the offices of megas logariastes and megas logothetes, or rather logothetes ton sekreton. It appears therefore that he was the successor of Theodore Kastamonites in the latter office. Belissariotes is mentioned with both offices in an act concerning the Great Lavra monastery of 1196, but in November 1197 he is recorded only as megas logariastes, indicating that in 1196/97, he had been replaced as logothetes ton sekreton. His successor was none other than Niketas Choniates. Belissariotes was promoted further to protasekretis and orphanotrophos, while his brother Michael became Eparch of Constantinople.

The Belissariotes brothers survived the sack of Constantinople by the Fourth Crusade in 1204, and along with Niketas Choniates found refuge in Nicaea, where the exiled Byzantines soon set up the Empire of Nicaea.

== Sources ==
- Choniates, Nicetas (1984). O City of Byzantium, Annals of Niketas Choniatēs. Translated by Harry J. Magoulias. Detroit: Wayne State University Press. ISBN 0-8143-1764-2.
- Guilland, Rodolphe (1971). "Les Logothètes: Etudes sur l'histoire administrative de l'Empire byzantin". Revue des études byzantines (in French). 29: 5–115. doi:10.3406/rebyz.1971.1441.
- Simpson, Alicia (2013). Niketas Choniates: A Historiographical Study. Oxford University Press. ISBN 978-0-19-967071-0.
