= Orphanotrophos =

Byzantine orphanage curator title

Orphanotrophos (Greek: ὀρφανοτρόφος) was a Byzantine title for the curator of an orphanage (ὀρφανοτροφεῖον, orphanotropheion). The director of the most important orphanage, the imperial orphanage in Constantinople, established in the 4th century and lasting until the 13th century, eventually rose to become an office of particular significance and ranked among the senior ministers of the Byzantine state.

== History ==
In the spirit of Christian philanthropy, the Byzantine world showed particular care towards the weaker members of society, including widows, orphans, the sick or the elderly. Orphans were either adopted by foster parents, or sheltered in monasteries or in orphanages, the latter often run by monasteries.

In Constantinople, the Byzantine capital, there was a particularly large orphanage in the northeastern corner of the city, at the site of the ancient acropolis of Byzantium, which eventually came under imperial patronage. According to the Patria of Constantinople, it traced its antecedents to a series of charitable establishments founded in the reign of Constantius II (r. 337–361) by the patrikios and protovestiarios Zotikos, for which the latter was canonized by the Church. According to a novel by Emperor Leo I the Thracian in 469, Zotikos was the first to bear the title of orphanotrophos. In the 5th century, the priest Nikon and Acacius, later Patriarch of Constantinople (472–488), are known to have been successively orphanotrophoi in the capital, while another future patriarch, Euphemius (489–495) held the post in the provincial town of Neapolis.

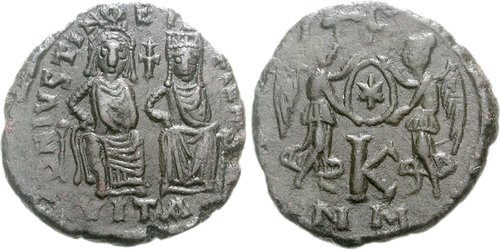
Twenty-nummi coin showing Justin II and Sophia enthroned. Legend: D N IVSTINO ET [SO]FIE A[V]G / K΄ N[U]M[M]I.

The legislation of Justinian I (r. 527–565) often mentions the orphanages and the office of orphanotrophos, but it was not until the reign of his successor Justin II (r. 565–578) that the institution in the capital acquired its definite characteristics: Justin and his wife Sophia, with the aid of a protovestiarios also named Zotikos, built an orphanage near the Church of St. Paul (or SS. Peter and Paul according to Theophanes the Confessor)—probably the church of the same name near the Gate of Eugenios on the sea-wall of the Golden Horn mentioned by Nikephoros Gregoras—and restored the foundation of the first Zotikos, which was possibly converted into a leprosarium. Justin bequeathed an annual stipend of 443 nomismata to the orphanage and made its possessions inalienable. It was probably then that the capital's orphanotrophos began to be appointed by the emperors. As a result, while in the provinces, the post of orphanotrophos continued to be occupied by clergymen, in the capital, it soon became a formal office and was held by members of the secular administrative hierarchy.

In the 9th–11th centuries, the orphanotrophos' role seems to have been limited to the imperial orphanage in the capital, while the provincial charitable foundations were under the supervision of two other officials, the chartoularios tou sakelliou and the megas kourator. The orphanotrophos was responsible for his wards and steward of their fortune until the age of 20, unless they married earlier; he was forbidden from selling his wards' possessions unless by special authorisation; and in case of maladministration was answerable to the Eparch of the City. According to the 10th-century De ceremoniis, the orphanotrophos had the following subordinate officials:

- the secretaries of the household (χαρτουλάριοι τοῦ οἴκου, chartoularioi tou oikou), probably administering the new orphanage founded by Justin II and Sophia
- the secretaries of the saint (χαρτουλάριοι τοῦ ὁσίου, chartoularioi tou hosiou), probably in charge of the original orphanage founded by Zotikos
- a treasurer (ἀρκάριος, arkarios), apparently common for both establishments
- a number of curators (κουράτωρες, kouratores) of unspecified function, perhaps administering affiliated institutions

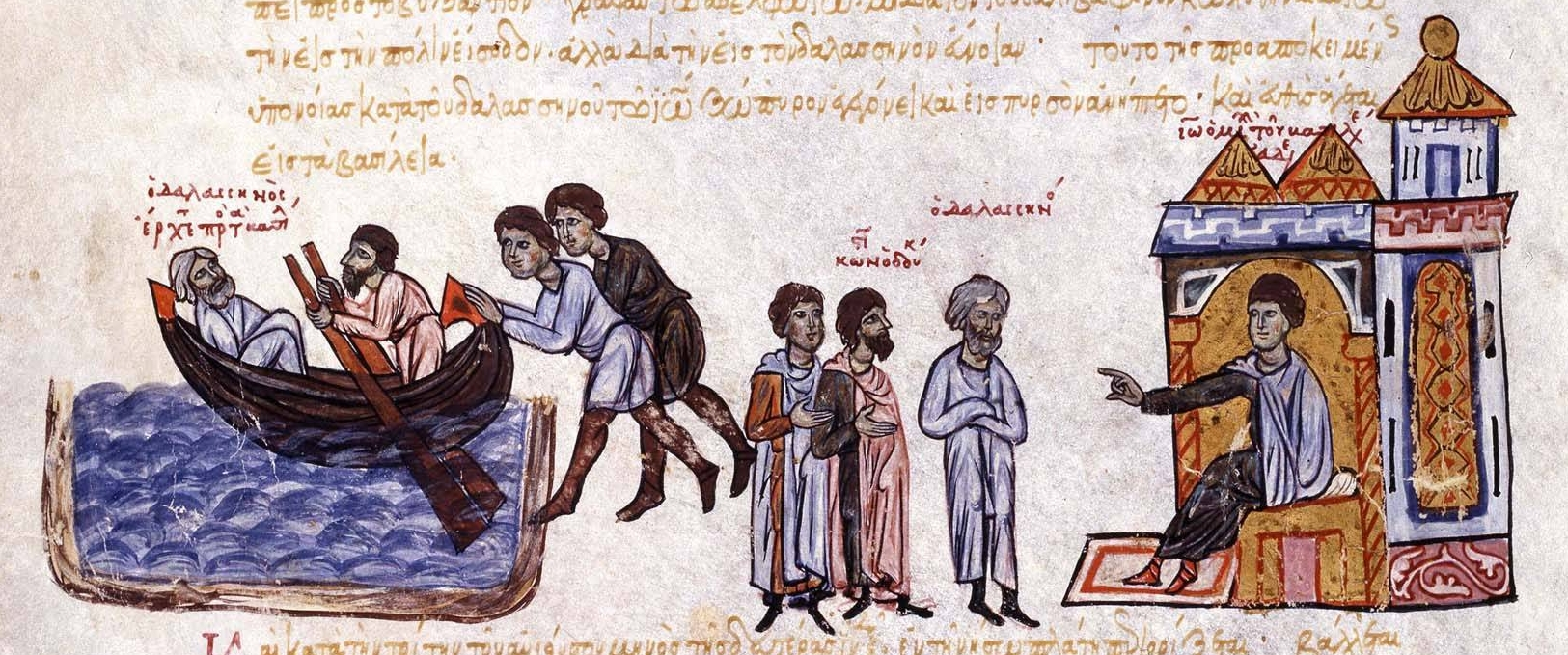
John the Orphanotrophos (seated, right), exiles the general Constantine Dalassenos. Miniature from the Madrid Skylitzes.

In the Taktikon Uspensky of c. 843, the orphanotrophos holds the exalted rank of patrikios and comes 37th in precedence, immediately after the chartoularios tou vestiariou, while in the Kletorologion of 899 he comes in 56th place among the dignities conferred by decree, after the epi ton deeseon. The De ceremoniis describes the orphanotrophos' role in certain imperial ceremonies, often along with his wards, who were led to the Emperor's presence, sung chants and received gifts from him. The court ranks conferred to the orphanotrophoi in the 9th–11th centuries were those of anthypatos, patrikios and protospatharios; this was restricted to the secular holders of the office, however, since as a rule, ecclesiastics did not hold a court rank. Several holders of the office, however, combined it with other secular administrative offices. Most famously, the eunuch John the Orphanotrophos rose to become the virtual regent of the Empire in the late reign of Romanos III Argyros (r. 1028–1034), before raising his brother Michael IV (r. 1034–1041) and nephew Michael V (r. 1041–42) to the throne. John was named orphanotrophos already under Romanos III, and after becoming a monk soon after, he divested himself of his other secular titles and maintained only the former, by which he is known.

The imperial orphanage was restored after being damaged by earthquakes in the late reign of Romanos III Argyros, but had once more fallen into disrepair by the time of Alexios I Komnenos (r. 1081–1118), whose manifold charitable activities included its restoration and the foundation of a veritable township of charitable institutions around it for the blind, lamed and crippled, or elderly. Alexios endowed the institution with considerable revenue, and founded a school where the orphans could receive a free tuition. Alexios' son and successor, John II Komnenos (r. 1118–1143), enlarged it further. During the period of the Latin Empire, its fate is unknown, but it is likely that like most Byzantine public buildings it fell into disrepair. As part of his wide-scale reconstruction of the city following its reconquest in 1261, Emperor Michael VIII Palaiologos (r. 1259–1282) erected a school "on the grounds of the old orphanotropheion", likely indicating that it had ceased to function for some time by then.

Despite the dissolution of the imperial orphanage, the office of the orphanotrophos survived into the Palaiologan period in its fiscal capacity. As early as the Kletorologion, the orphanotrophos was classed among the fiscal secretaries, the sekretikoi (occupying the 11th place among them), and he apparently succeeded an earlier fiscal official, the "kourator of the Mangana", in his functions. In the early 14th century, Manuel Philes still calls him "the treasurer of imperial means", but the mid-14th century Book of Offices of pseudo-Kodinos records that the office, although still occupying the 56th place in the palace hierarchy, no longer had a particular function. According to Kodinos, his court dress consisted of a long silk kabbadion, and a domed skaranikon hat covered in red velvet and topped by a small red tassel.

== List of known orphanotrophoi ==
Orphanotropos	List of Orphanotrophia	Notes	Refs
Zotikos	under Constans II (r. 337–361)	First holder of the title and founder of the namesake orphanage, put to death by Constans II.	
Nikon	under Leo I (r. 457–474)	Priest, predecessor of Acacius.	
Acacius	under Leo I (r. 457–474), before 472	Nikon's successor, held the office before his elevation to the patriarchate in March 472.	
Euphemius	before 489	Was priest and orphanotrophos in Neapolis before his elevation to the patriarchate in spring 489.	
George	c. 869–870	Deacon and orphanotrophos (unclear if in Constantinople or the provinces), attested in the Fourth Council of Constantinople. Addressee of a letter by Photios.	
Leo	early 9th century	Patrikios and orphanotrophos, addressee of a letter by Theodore Stoudites.	
Nikephoros	late 9th/early 10th century	Bishop of Nicaea, attested as orphanotrophos in the Vita Ignatii.	
Paul	under Romanos I Lekapenos (r. 920–944)	Friend and co-conspirator of the magistros Stephen and Theophanes Teichiotes against the emperor. Following the plot's discovery, he was tonsured and banished to Antigone.	
Demetrios	c. 942	Kouboukleisios of the cathedral of Thessalonica and orphanotrophos of the local diocese, signatory in an act of May 942.	
John	late 10th century	Civil judge (krites) of the Armeniac Theme, addressee of two letters by Nikephoros Ouranos.	
Melias	c. 1030	Patrikios and orphanotrophos, signatory in a synodal act of 1030.	
John the Orphanotrophos	c. 1034–1041	Head of the eunuch palace servants as praipositos, he became orphanotrophos towards the end of the reign of Romanos III. After the latter's death, he raised his brother Michael IV to the throne and was the de facto ruler of the Empire throughout his reign. After Michael IV's death he raised his nephew Michael V to the throne, but was soon after deposed and banished. He was killed on the orders of Constantine IX Monomachos (r. 1042–1055) in May 1043.	
Alexios Aristenos	before 1157	Aristenos followed a mixed ecclesiastic and secular judicial career and held several offices, among which that of orphanotrophos. Writer of a treatise on canon law.	
Kandidos	c. 1162	A monk, mentioned in a note by John Kontostephanos, the governor of Thessalonica in November 1162.	
Michael Hagiotheodorites	before 1166 – after 1170	Attested as orphanotrophos and logothetes tou dromou in the acts of synods in 1166 and 1170, he also held other senior judicial offices, and was an addressee of several of notable scholars and figures of the period.	
John Belissariotes	late 12th/early 13th century	A senior official who held the posts of orphanotrophos, logothetes ton sekreton, megas logariastes, and protasekretis.	
Edessenos	c. 1246	Apographeus (head of the census and tax assessment) of eastern Macedonia.	
Leon Bardales	c. 1296–1300	Ambassador, along with his friend Maximos Planoudes, to the Republic of Venice in 1296.	
Aidesenos	14th century	Composer of a sigillion on the Docheiariou monastery.	
Alexios	c. 1348	Mentioned in the acts of the 1348 Synod of Constantinople, along with his brother, the stratopedarches Demetrios.	
Kallistos	c. 1391	Priest, mentioned in a text of early 1391.	
Tryphon Kedrenos	c. 1316	Sebastos and orphanotrophos, tasked with assessing the properties of eastern Macedonia in 1316.	
Manuel Chageres	14th century	Mentioned in an act of 1369 for the Zographou monastery, but possibly having served far earlier, under Andronikos II Palaiologos (r. 1282–1328).	
Constantine N.	c. 1342	Pansebastos sebastos, orphanotrophos and oikeios of the emperor.	
Michael Gemistos	c. 1401	Priest, mentioned in a property transaction.	

A number of seals of otherwise unidentified holders of the office have also survived. One records a Datos, "orphanotrophos and vestarches", while the others cannot be certainly dated. Two seals also survive of subordinate officials, one of the deacon Michael Tetrapolites, clerk and functionary of the orphanage, and another, dated to the 13th century, of Niketas, Bishop of Ionopolis and chartoularios of the mega orphanotropheion ("great orphanage").

== Sources ==
- Bury, J. B. (1911). The Imperial Administrative System of the Ninth Century – With a Revised Text of the Kletorologion of Philotheos. London: Oxford University Press. OCLC 1046639111.
- Guilland, Rodolphe (1965). "Étude sur l'histoire administrative de l'empire byzantin: L'orphanotrophe". Revue des études byzantines (in French). 23: 205–221. doi:10.3406/rebyz.1965.1348.
- Kazhdan, Alexander (1991). "Orphanotrophos". In Kazhdan, Alexander (ed.). The Oxford Dictionary of Byzantium. Oxford and New York: Oxford University Press. pp. 1537–1538. ISBN 0-19-504652-8.
- Talbot, Alice-Mary; Kazhdan, Alexander (1991). "Orphanages". In Kazhdan, Alexander (ed.). The Oxford Dictionary of Byzantium. Oxford and New York: Oxford University Press. p. 1537. ISBN 0-19-504652-8.
