= Euphrosyne Kastamonitissa =

Byzantine noble lady of the 12th century

Euphrosyne Kastamonitissa (Greek: Εύφροσύνη Κασταμονίτισσα) was a Byzantine noblewoman of the Kastamonites family, a wife of Andronikos Doukas Angelos (a cousin of the ruling Komnenos dynasty) and mother of the two future Byzantine emperors from the Angelos family: Isaac II Angelos and Alexios III Angelos.

== Under Manuel I Komnenos ==
Euphrosyne and Andronikos married c. 1150. Together, they had eight children, six sons and two daughters. However in 1179/80, Andronikos attempted to annul his legal marriage with Euphrosyne, so to marry another woman that he had fallen in love with. Andronikos' matrimonial plans failed thanks to the intervention of Emperor Manuel I Komnenos in support of Euphrosyne. A church synod that was asked to solve this issue also decided in favor of her.

== Under Andronikos I Komnenos ==
During the reign of the Emperor Andronikos I Komnenos, her family members rebelled against Andronikos, but the plot was uncovered. While most of the conspirators were seized and blinded by the Emperor, Andronikos and his sons managed to escape by ship.

In 1185, her son Isaac also rebelled and barricaded himself along with others behind the strong walls of the city of Nicaea in Asia Minor. In order to break the morale of the besieged, Andronikos brought Euphrosyne from Constantinople and placed her at the top of a battering ram. Niketas Choniates mentions that it was almost a miracle that she didn't die from the terror of this action. Nevertheless, the defenders kept sending missiles towards Andronikos' men, but they were very careful not to harm Euphrosyne's exposed body. The Nicaeans eventually burned the siege engines of Andronikos, saved Euphrosyne and pulled her up in the safety of the city with a rope.

== Under Isaac II Angelos ==
Euphrosyne descended from a family of bureaucrats that helped her son Isaac establish his rule after the fall of Andronikos I Komnenos in 1185 thanks to the rebellion of the people of Constantinople. Theodore Kastamonites, her brother, became the all-powerful chief minister of Isaac.

Euphrosyne was fortunate to see her son as Emperor for one year. In 1186, she accompanied her son Isaac in his campaign against the governor of Dyrrhachium, who had rebelled against the imperial throne. The Emperor besieged and stormed the city but Euphrosyne died during his return to Constantinople.

== Sources ==
- Brand, Charles M. (1968). Byzantium Confronts the West, 1180–1204. Cambridge, Massachusetts: Harvard University Press. LCCN 67-20872.
- Magoulias, Harry J., ed. (1984). O City of Byzantium: Annals of Niketas Choniatēs. Detroit: Wayne State University Press. ISBN 978-0-8143-1764-8.
- Varzos, Konstantinos (1984). Η Γενεαλογία των Κομνηνών [The Genealogy of the Komnenoi] (PDF) (in Greek). Vol. A2. Thessaloniki: Centre for Byzantine Studies, University of Thessaloniki.
