= Constantine Stilbes =

Byzantine rhetor, author, and clergyman

Constantine Stilbes (Greek: Κωνσταντίνος Στιλβής, fl. 2nd half of 12th century) was a Byzantine rhetor and clergyman, and a prolific author of ecclesiastical treatises, letters, and poetry.

== Biography ==
He was born in the mid-12th century and the date of his death is unknown. From his own writings it is clear that he became a deacon and magister in the Patriarchal School of Constantinople. A little before 1204 he was promoted to the metropolitan bishopric of Cyzicus, which he had to relinquish shortly after the Latin conquest. Although most of what is known about Stilbes comes from his own works, Niketas Choniates does praise a certain "Stilbes, a good man in every regard" (ὁ καλὸς τὰ πάντα Στιλβὴς).

== Works ==
Stilbes' works pertain mostly to theology, the best known among scholars is his Errors of the Latin Church, which Stilbes compiled in the wake of the Fourth Crusade. The list describes western "errors," including their failure to honour foreign saints and their hatred of the Emperor Constantine for creating New Rome. Stilbes is also known for his poem describing a catastrophic fire that took place in Constantinople on July 25, 1197. Running to about a thousand lines, the Carmen de Incendio describes the course of the fire along the Golden Horn from the Gate of the Droungarios (Turkish: Odun Kapısı) through the Latin Quarter, using ekphrases rich with Biblical and Classical metaphors. The poem is an important resource for those studying the urban topography of Medieval Constantinople, as it describes the burning of three story houses and aristocratic houses with turrets, and it makes allusions to coastal roads, aqueducts, the Neorion Harbour , granaries, the Church of the Forty Martyrs, and the Church of the Theotokos Kyriotissa. Byzantinist Paul Magdalino has used the poem to date the medieval reconstruction of the Kyriotissa church to between the date of the fire in 1197 and the Fourth Crusade in 1204. An annotated version of the poem is available in English translation.
