= Michael Stryphnos =

12th/13th-century Byzantine courtier

Michael Stryphnos (Greek: Μιχαὴλ Στρυφνός, fl. ca. 1190–1203) was a high-ranking Byzantine official under the Angeloi emperors.

Stryphnos is first attested in 1192 as sebastos and the head of the vestiarion (the imperial treasury), under Emperor Isaac II Angelos (reigned 1185–1195). Stryphnos then married Theodora, the daughter of Andronikos Kamateros and sister of Empress Euphrosyne Doukaina Kamatera, the wife of Emperor Alexios III Angelos (r. 1195–1203) and through this connection advanced to the position of megas doux, commander-in-chief of the Byzantine navy, when the latter ascended the throne. The contemporary historian Niketas Choniates portrays him as a man of "extraordinary rapacity and rare dishonesty" (Guilland), who used his position to sell off the sails, anchors and other equipment of the fleet, down to the very nails of the ships. His actions marked the effective end of the Byzantine fleet, which was hence unable to resist the Fourth Crusade a few years later.

As megas doux, he was also governor of the joint province of Hellas and Peloponnese (southern mainland Greece), and in this capacity he went to Athens c. 1201–1202 to oppose the rising power of Leo Sgouros, a local magnate turned autonomous ruler. He does not seem to have succeeded in checking Sgouros, but the local bishop, Michael Choniates, nevertheless composed an encomium in his honour. Three seals of Stryphnos survive, as well as a large enamelled gold ring, possibly given to him on his appointment as megas doux.

== Sources ==
- Brand, Charles M.; Cutler, Anthony (1991). "Stryphnos, Michael". In Kazhdan, Alexander (ed.). The Oxford Dictionary of Byzantium. Oxford and New York: Oxford University Press. p. 1968. ISBN 0-19-504652-8.
- Guilland, Rodolphe (1967). "Le Drongaire de la flotte, le Grand drongaire de la flotte, le Duc de la flotte, le Mégaduc". Recherches sur les institutions byzantines [Studies on the Byzantine Institutions]. Berliner byzantinische Arbeiten 35 (in French). Vol. I. Berlin and Amsterdam: Akademie-Verlag & Adolf M. Hakkert. pp. 535–562. OCLC 878894516.
- Ross, Marvin Chauncey (2005), Catalogue of the Byzantine And Early Medieval Antiquities in the Dumbarton Oaks Collection, Volume 2: Jewelry, Enamels, and Art Of The Migration Period (2nd ed.), Dumbarton Oaks Research Library and Collection, ISBN 0-88402-301-X
