= Theodore Kastamonites =

Byzantine aristocrat

Theodore Kastamonites (Greek: Θεόδωρος Κασταμονίτης) was a Byzantine aristocrat and the all-powerful chief minister for most of the first reign of his nephew, Emperor Isaac II Angelos.

== Life ==
The Kastamonites family probably hailed from Kastamon in Paphlagonia, and emerged in the late 11th century as one of the Byzantine Empire's aristocratic clans, with its members holding various civil and military offices under the Komnenian emperors. Theodore was the brother of Euphrosyne Kastamonitissa, wife of Andronikos Doukas Angelos and mother of the emperors Isaac II Angelos (r. 1185–1195, 1203–1204) and Alexios III Angelos (r. 1195–1203).

When Isaac II ascended the throne, he was unable to rely on the support of the restive and ambitious noble families, and turned to the bureaucracy for support. Immediately after his accession, Isaac II placed his uncle in charge of the financial administration.

Although suffering from gout so that he had to be carried about in a litter, according to his contemporary Niketas Choniates, Kastamonites was a capable official, particularly in taxation matters—the Pisan and Genoese merchants in particular complained that he always exacted full customs duties from them—and an eloquent speaker. As a result, Isaac soon promoted him to logothetes ton sekreton, putting him in charge of supervising all the civilian departments. Indeed, Kastamonites became the de facto ruler of the empire, as he handled all government affairs, and his nephew always acceded to his requests. Officials and nobles alike had to stand in his presence and show him deference. His position was so exalted that Isaac allowed him to use imperial attributes, such as the purple military cloak and a purple saddle cover, or signing with the special purple ink reserved for the emperor. He was the first official to be called megas logothetes ("Grand Logothete"), in a chrysobull granted to the Genoese by Isaac II in 1192, a title which soon replaced that of logothetes ton sekreton.

Nevertheless, on 15 August 1193, during the procession of the Dormition of the Theotokos, Kastamonites was hailed by the crowd as lord and emperor; hearing that, he was stricken by apoplexy, and although he briefly recovered, he died a few days later. He was succeeded as chief minister of the Empire by Constantine Mesopotamites.

== Sources ==
- Brand, Charles M. (1968). Byzantium Confronts the West, 1180–1204. Cambridge, Massachusetts: Harvard University Press. LCCN 67-20872.
- Choniates, Nicetas (1984). O City of Byzantium, Annals of Niketas Choniatēs. Translated by Harry J. Magoulias. Detroit: Wayne State University Press. ISBN 0-8143-1764-2.
- Guilland, Rodolphe (1971). "Les Logothètes: Etudes sur l'histoire administrative de l'Empire byzantin". Revue des études byzantines (in French). 29: 5–115. doi:10.3406/rebyz.1971.1441.
- Kazhdan, Alexander, ed. (1991). The Oxford Dictionary of Byzantium. Oxford and New York: Oxford University Press. ISBN 0-19-504652-8.
- Varzos, Konstantinos (1984). Η Γενεαλογία των Κομνηνών [The Genealogy of the Komnenoi] (PDF) (in Greek). Vol. A2. Thessaloniki: Centre for Byzantine Studies, University of Thessaloniki.
