= Ascletario =

Ancient Greek astrologer and mathematician

Ascletario was an astrologer and mathematician who lived in the time of the Roman emperor Domitian (that is, the 1st century CE).

The historian Suetonius relates an anecdote in which Ascletario was brought before the emperor for the offense of having predicted the emperor's downfall. Domitian tried to put the knowledge of the astrologer to the test, and asked him what kind of death Ascletario was to die, whereupon he answered, "I know that I shall soon be torn to pieces by the dogs."

To prevent the realization of this prediction (and therefore the validation of Ascletario's powers), Domitian ordered him to be put to death immediately, and to be buried. When his body lay on the funeral pile, a stiff wind arose, which carried the body from the pile, and some dogs, which had been near, immediately began devouring the half-roasted body. Domitian, on being informed of this, is said to have been more moved and perplexed than he had ever been before. He was assassinated shortly thereafter, in 96 CE.

The Byzantine historians George Kedrenos, Constantine Manasses, and Michael Glykas give very different accounts of the same story.
