= Khazar–Circassian wars =

Series of conflicts between the Khazars and the Circassian peoples

Circassian–Khazar conflicts
- Part of Khazar–Caucasian relations
Date	Late 9th – early 10th century
Location	Caucasus, Khazar Khaganate
Result	Circassian victory
Territorial changes	Khazars lost control over the lands of Circassians

Belligerents
Kassogian tribes Alanians (Kingdom of Hungary) Hungarians	Khazar Khaganate

Commanders and leaders
Folkloric commanders: Bezruqo Boletuqo; Aledjuqo Qanzhe; Prince Famaqo; Prince Hatu	Governor of Sarkel (POW) (in 975)

Strength
Unknown	Unknown

Adding template for info written in article

The Khazar–Circassian Wars are a series of conflicts between the Turkic Khazar Khaganate and the Caucasian Circassian peoples with the reason of Circassians' not wanting to pay tribute to Khazars and maintain their independence in North Caucasus.

== History ==
=== Reasons ===
In the last quarter of the 7th century, the Khazars entered the North Caucasus, leading to the collapse of the Old Great Bulgaria. This marked the beginning of a prolonged "Khazar period" in the region. Their primary strategic goal was to establish control over the Kerch Strait and the Taman Peninsula. To maintain this, they established a military district in Taman known as Tmutarakan, where a permanent Khazar garrison was stationed.

The Circassians opposed the payment of Khazar tribute, which was one of the main forms of dependence imposed by the Khazar Khaganate on its vassal peoples. The Adyghe also resisted the seizure of steppe and mountain pastures by nomadic groups that were part of the Khaganate, as these lands had traditionally been used by the Circassians themselves. In addition, they opposed the establishment of Khazar control over mountain passes that crossed their territories. Despite the coastal presence of Khazars, the core Zikhia (Circassian) territories beyond the Kuban River remained outside of Khazar control. The military potential of the Zikhs was formidable, allowing local princes and dynasties to maintain full sovereignty. During this era, Zikhia was noted as one of the few regions around the Black Sea that managed to remain independent of both the Khazars and the Byzantine Empire.

=== Circassian–Hungarian alliance against the Khazars ===
According to historian Barasbi Bgazhnokov, the Circassians (identified with the Kasogs and early Kabardians, part of the Circassians) formed a military alliance with the Hungarians in the 9th century against the Khazar Khaganate. This alliance lasted approximately 25–30 years and was based on a common struggle against Khazar domination.

Strengthened by the Kabars, described by Constantine VII as more warlike than the Hungarians, the allied forces expelled the Khazars from Crimea, captured Kerch in 873, and later drove them out of Phanagoria (Tmutarakan). They also seized large parts of the Pre-Caucasian steppe, reflected in the name of the city Majari, derived from the ethnonym Magyars.

The Kabars were likely not subordinate to the Hungarians; rather, the alliance appears to have been one of equal partners. Some scholars suggest that Árpád, the Hungarian leader, may have originated from Kabar nobility. Even after the Hungarians left the Pontic steppes in 889, Kabar groups remained in the Azov region, the Don basin, and parts of eastern Crimea, supported by the Zygii, an Adyghe tribal group frequently mentioned as enemies of the Khazars in early medieval sources.

=== Military campaigns ===
A fatal blow to the Khazar Khaganate was delivered in 968 by Sviatoslav I of Kyiv, which led to the collapse of the Khazar state and ended its threat to the Caucasus.

Further evidence of these hostilities is found in the Schechter Letter (an anonymous 10th-century Khazar Jewish document), which lists the "Zibus" (likely a transcription of Zikhs/Zygii) among the peoples who fought against the Khazars.

After the fall of the Khaganate, many peoples who had lived under its rule converted to Islam, including the Kumyks and Nogais, who became part of the Caucasian world. Jewish groups from the former Khazar state retreated into the Caucasus mountains, where they gradually lost memory of their past dominance. Despite their military campaigns and seasonal raids led by Khazar rulers who had adopted Judaism, the Khazars ultimately failed to achieve their long-term ambitions, and their power in the region came to an end.

==== Circassian oral traditions and legends ====
According to a Circassian legend recorded by Shora Nogmov in 19th century, a major conflict initiated by Princes Bezruqo Boletuqo and Aledjuqo Qanzhe against the Khazar Khaganate. According to these accounts, Aledjuqo was captured and held in the fortress of Sarkel for three years until an alliance was formed with a leader identified in folklore as a 'Tatar Khan' (historically interpreted as Svyatoslav I of Kyiv). The combined forces reportedly captured Sarkel and Tmutarakan, leading to the liberation of Aledjuqo and the seizure of the Azov coastline. However, these narratives are considered legends and anachronistic, noting that the specific personas and clan names mentioned likely reflect later periods of Circassian history projected onto 10th-century events.

According to these oral accounts, Aledjuqo was captured while on a reconnaissance mission after encountering a superior Khazar force. Although Prince Bezruqo intervened and defeated the Khazar army in a fierce battle, he was unable to prevent Aledjuqo's imprisonment in the fortress of Sarkel, where the prince remained for three years. During this period, a conflict between the Circassians and the forces of Tmutarakan eventually shifted into a military alliance. With the support of these Kievan Rus’ forces from Tmutarakan, the Circassians launched a joint campaign that resulted in the fall of Sarkel and the successful liberation of Prince Aleguko. Besides Bezruqo and Aledjuqo, the song recorded by Shora Nogmov mentions warriors named Famaqo and Hatu.

=== Massacre of the Khazars in Tmutarakan (1083) ===
In 1083, with the support of the Byzantine Empire, Oleg Sviatoslavich captured Tmutarakan. He destroyed the remaining Jewish Khazars in the city. According to the chronicle:

In the year 6591 (1083), Oleg came from the Greek lands to Tmutarakan, captured David and Volodar Rostislavich, and took control of Tmutarakan. He killed the Khazars who had plotted to kill him and his brother, but released David and Volodar.

A massacre took place in Tmutarakan, where the Jewish Khazars—long-time enemies of Oleg—were exterminated, and Princes David and Volodar were expelled. It is clear that Oleg could not have carried out this brutal action alone. Most likely, he was supported by the local peoples: Yasy (Alans), Kasogs (Circassians), and possibly the Cumans.

== Aftermath ==
By the end of the 7th century, the Circassians began forming short-term alliances with the Khazars. By the end of that century, this alliance was firmly established. However, by the late 9th century, the Adyghe had completely expelled the Khazars from all their former lands. Following the collapse of the Khazar Khaganate in 965 due to attacks by the Pechenegs and the Kievan Rus', the regional power vacuum was filled by the Pechenegs and later the Kipchaks (Cumans). Throughout these migrations, the Circassians successfully maintained their presence and autonomy south of the Kuban River, outlasting the nomadic empires that sought to dominate the steppes.
