= Michael Doukas =

Michael Doukas may refer to:

- Michael VII Doukas (c. 1050–c. 1090), Byzantine emperor
- Michael I Komnenos Doukas (died 1215), ruler of the Despotate of Epirus (1205–1215)
- Michael II Komnenos Doukas (died 1266/8), ruler of the Despotate of Epirus (1230–1266/8)
- Michael Doukas (historian) (c. 1400–after 1462), late Byzantine historian
- Michael Doukas (protostrator) (c. 1061–before 1117)
