= Kazarki =

Kazarki was a Khazar settlement. It was located west of the Volga River and north of Sarkel (probably in the present-day Penza Oblast), from roughly the 7th through the 10th centuries CE. The area around it was known in early Russian sources as Volost' Kazarskaya, or "Khazar region."

== Resources ==
- Kevin Alan Brook. The Jews of Khazaria, 3rd ed., Lanham, MD: Rowman and Littlefield, 2018.
- Peter B. Golden. Khazar Studies: An Historico-Philological Inquiry into the Origins of the Khazars, Vol. 1. Budapest: Akadémiai Kiadó, 1980.
