= Golden Hills (Russia) =

Coordinates: 47.468°N 40.403°E

Golden Hills (in Russian, Zolotiye Gorki) is an archaeological site in southern Russia. It is located in the region of the lower Don River, on the Aksay River about 70 km (43 mi) east of Rostov-on-Don.

Golden Hills was the site of a fortress during the early Middle Ages. It appears to have been part of a chain of fortifications erected or maintained by the Khazar Khaganate. The main Khazar fort in this area is believed to be at Semikarakorsk, located about 20 km to the east.

Artefacts from the site conform to those found at other Saltovo-Mayaki settlements from the Khazar period (c. 8th-10th centuries CE)

The site was excavated beginning in June 2002 by a group of Russian, American, and British scholars from the Rostov State University and the Center for the Study of Eurasian Nomads. They carried out a geomagnetic survey and excavated approximately 100 m^{2} (1,100 sq ft)

== Resources ==
- Golden Hills excavation report at Khazaria.com
- Donskaya Arkheologia Report
