= Sabine Ladstätter =

Austrian classical archaeologist (1968–2024)

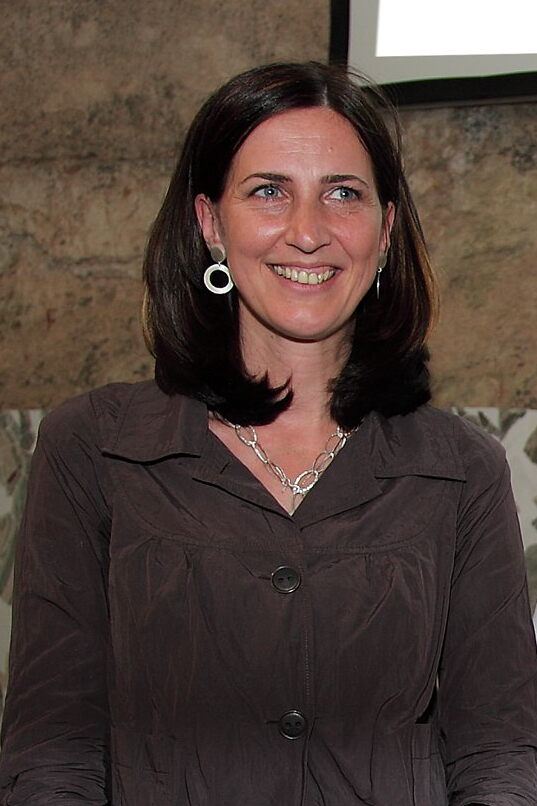
Sabine Ladstätter at the launch of the international Ephesus Foundation, 2010

Sabine Ladstätter (22 November 1968 – 3 June 2024) was an Austrian classical archaeologist. She was Director of the Austrian Archaeological Institute (ÖAI) from 2009 to 2024.

== Education and career ==
Ladstätter completed a degree in Classical Archaeology, Ancient History and Classical Studies at the University of Graz from 1986 to 1992, and then completed a master's degree in archaeology in 1992. Ladstätter completed her doctoral studies at the University of Vienna from 1993 to 1997. In 1997/98 she was a research assistant at the Archaeology Research Centre of the Austrian Academy of Sciences (ÖAW), where she worked on the late antique finds from the legionary camp at Carnuntum. From 1998 to 2007 she was a research assistant at the Archaeology Research Centre and the Institute for the Cultural History of Antiquity of the ÖAW.

From 2001 to 2007, Ladstätter was Deputy Managing Director of the Institute for the Cultural History of the Ancient World at the Austrian Academy of Sciences. From 2007 she was a scientific employee of the ÖAI as deputy director and from 2010 she was director of the Ephesus excavation. In October 2009, Science Minister Johannes Hahn appointed Ladstätter as the new director of the Austrian Archaeological Institute (ÖAI), which was founded in 1898, succeeding Johannes Koder, who had headed the institute on an interim basis since 2007, making her the first woman to hold this position.

Ladstätter lectured at the University of Vienna since 2001, where she habilitated in Classical Archaeology in 2007. She focused in particular on the ancient metropolis of Ephesus and pottery finds.

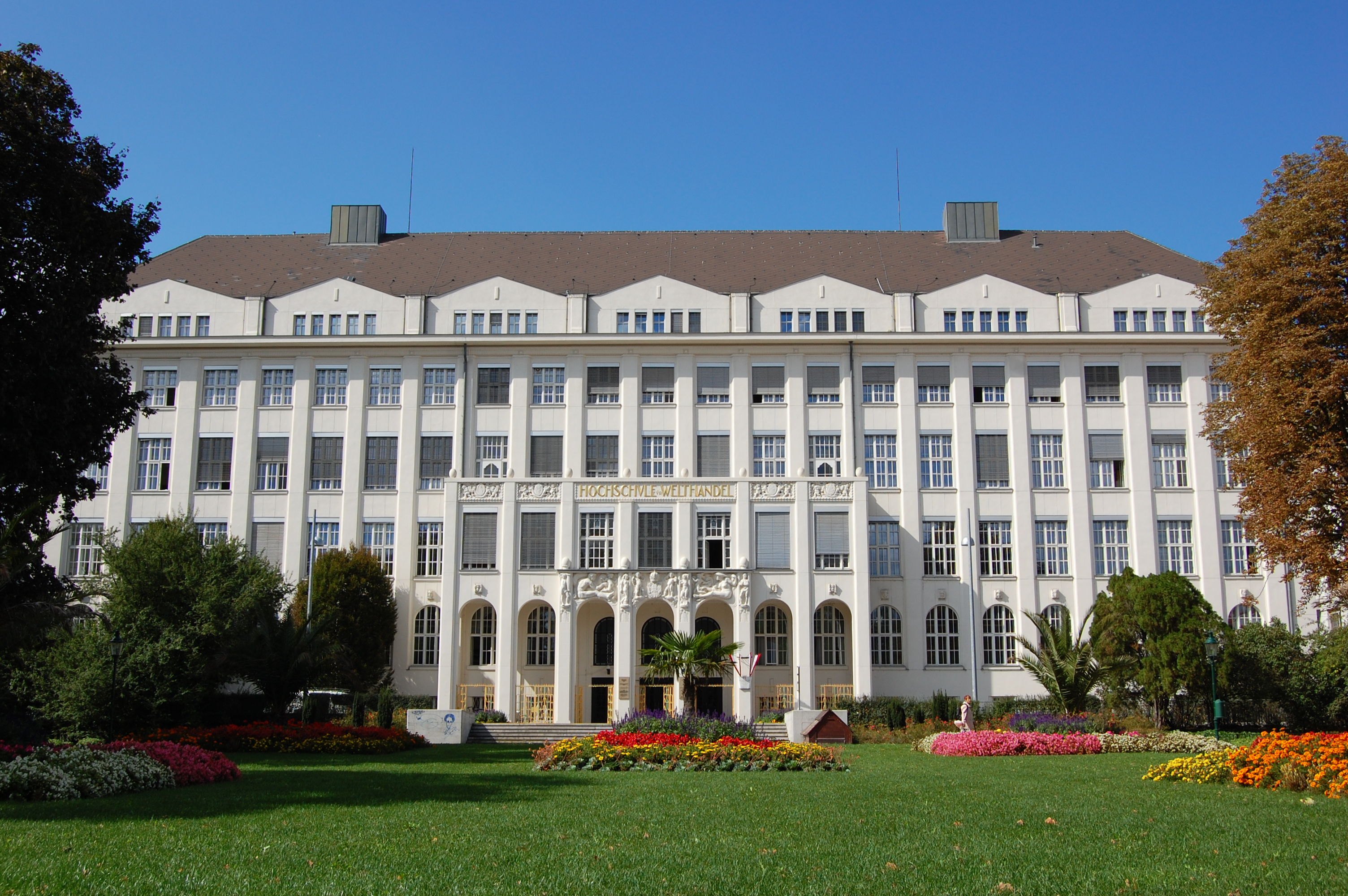
Vienna University, until 2023 also the location of the ÖAI (2005)

Sabine Ladstätter died after a long illness in June 2024 at the age of 55 and was buried in Tainach.

== Publications ==
- Die materielle Kultur der Spätantike in den Ostalpen. Eine Fallstudie am Beispiel der westlichen Doppelkirchenanlage auf dem Hemmaberg (= MPK Band 35). 2000.
- mit Verena Gassner, Sonja Jilek: Am Rande des Reiches: Die Römer in Österreich. Ueberreuter, Wien 2002, ISBN 3-8000-3772-6.
- (Hrsg.): Neue Forschungen zur Kuretenstraße von Ephesos. Akten des Symposions für Hilke Thür vom 13. Dezember 2006 an der Österreichischen Akademie der Wissenschaften (= Archäologische Forschungen. Band 15). Wien 2009.
- mit Norbert Zimmermann: Wandmalerei in Ephesos von hellenistischer bis in byzantinische Zeit. Phoibos, Wien 2010, ISBN 978-3-85161-035-2.
- Das Hanghaus 2 in Ephesos. Ein archäologischer Führer. Ege Yayınları, Istanbul 2012, ISBN 978-605-5607-94-4.
- mit Lois Lammerhuber, Niki Gail: Die Katzen von Ephesos = Epes'in Kedileri = The cats of Ephesos. Lammerhuber, Baden / Turkiye iş Kültür Yayınları, Istanbul 2012, ISBN 978-3-901753-38-1 / ISBN 978-605-360-929-2.
- Knochen, Steine, Scherben. Abenteuer Archäologie. Scherben erzählen Geschichte. Residenz Verlag, St. Pölten 2013, ISBN 9783701733163.
- mit Felix Pirson, Thomas Schmidts (Hrsg.): Häfen und Hafenstädte im östlichen Mittelmeerraum von der Antike bis in byzantinische Zeit – neue Entdeckungen und aktuelle Forschungsansätze. Istanbul, 30.5.–1.6.2011 (= Byzas Band 19). Ege Yayınları, Istanbul 2014, ISBN 978-605-4-70160-5.
- Die Türbe im Artemision. Ein frühosmanischer Grabbau in Ayasuluk/Selçuk und sein kulturhistorisches Umfeld (= Sonderschriften des Österreichischen Archäologischen Instituts 53). Österreichisches Archäologisches Institut, Wien 2015, ISBN 978-3-900305-77-2.
- mit Michaela Binder (Hrsg.): Die Heilige vom Hemmaberg. Cold Case einer Reliquie. Verlag Holzhausen, Wien 2018, ISBN 978-3-903207-19-6.
- mit Falko Daim (Hrsg.): Ephesos in byzantinischer Zeit. Römisch-Germanisches Zentralmuseum, Mainz 2011, ISBN 978-3-88467-160-3.
- mit Paul Magdalino (Hrsg.): Ephesos from Late Antiquity until the Late Middle Ages. Proceedings of the International Conference at the Research Center for Anatilian Civilzations, Koç University, Istanbul, 30th November-2nd December 2012 (= Sonderschriften. Österreichisches Archäologisches Institut Band 58). Holzhausen, Wien 2019, ISBN 978-3-903207-42-4.
