= Cherson (theme) =

Byzantine theme (administrative district)

Theme of Cherson (Klimata) Χερσῶν, θέμα Χερσῶνος (τὰ Κλίματα)
- Theme of the Byzantine Empire
- c. 833/840–1204
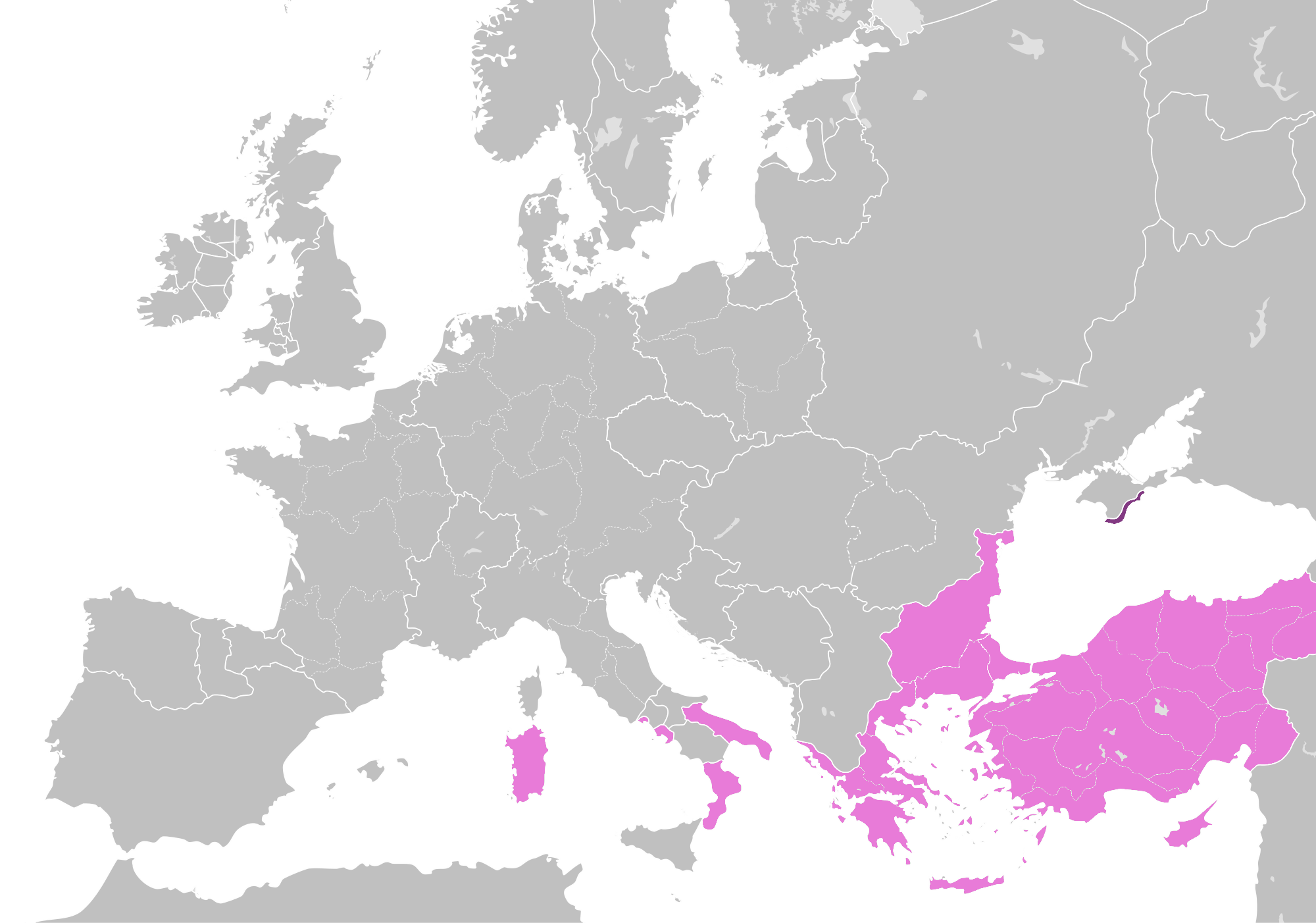
- Map of the Theme of Cherson within the Byzantine Empire in 1000 AD.
- Capital: Cherson
- Area
  - Coordinates: 44.676°N 34.063°E
- Historical era: Middle Ages
  - Established: c. 833 or 840
  - Destruction of Cherson: 988/989
  - Controlled by the Empire of Trebizond: after 1204
Preceded by	Succeeded by
Khazars	Perateia
- Today part of: Crimea

The Theme of Cherson (Greek: θέμα Χερσῶνος, Thema Chersōnos), originally and formally called the Klimata (Greek: τὰ Κλίματα), was a Byzantine theme (a military-civilian province) located in the southern Crimea, headquartered at Cherson.

The theme was officially established in the early 830s and was an important centre of Black Sea commerce. Despite the destruction of the city of Cherson in the 980s, the theme recovered and prospered, enduring until it became a part of the Empire of Trebizond after the dissolution of the Byzantine Empire in 1204.

== History ==
The region had been under Roman and later Byzantine imperial control until the early 8th century, but passed under Khazar control thereafter. Byzantine authority was re-established by Emperor Theophilos (r. 829–842), who displayed interest in the northern littoral of the Black Sea and especially his relations with the Khazars. Traditional scholarship dates the establishment of Cherson as the seat of a theme in ca. 833/4, but more recent researchers have linked it with the Byzantine mission to construct the new Khazar capital at Sarkel in 839, and identify Petronas Kamateros, the architect of Sarkel, as the theme's first governor (strategos) in 840/1. The new province was at first called ta Klimata, "the regions/districts", but due to the prominence of the capital Cherson, by ca. 860 it was known even in official documents as the "Theme of Cherson".

The province played an important role in Byzantine relations with the Khazars and later, after the Khazar Khaganate's collapse, with the Pechenegs and the Rus'. It was a center for Byzantine diplomacy rather than military activity, since the military establishment in the theme seems to have been small and to have chiefly consisted of a locally raised militia. Its weakness is underlined by the stipulation, in the Byzantine treaties with the Rus' of 945 and 971, of the latter's undertaking to defend it against the Volga Bulgars.

Cherson prospered greatly during the 9th–11th centuries as a centre of Black Sea commerce (the Black Sea being a major center of the Black Sea slave trade), despite the city's destruction by Vladimir of Kiev in 988/9 due to a dispute over the daughter of Romanos II, Anna. The city recovered quickly: the city's fortifications were restored and extended to the harbour in the early 11th century. At the same time, possibly after the defeat of Georgius Tzul in 1016, the theme was extended over the eastern Crimea as well, as evidenced by the styling of a certain Leo Aliates as "strategos of Cherson and Sougdaia" in 1059. The region however was lost again in the late 11th century to the Cumans. Almost nothing is known of Cherson in the 12th century, pointing to a rather tranquil period. Cherson and its province remained under Byzantine control until the dissolution of the Empire by the Fourth Crusade in 1204, when they passed under the sovereignty of the breakaway Empire of Trebizond (see Perateia).

== Administration ==
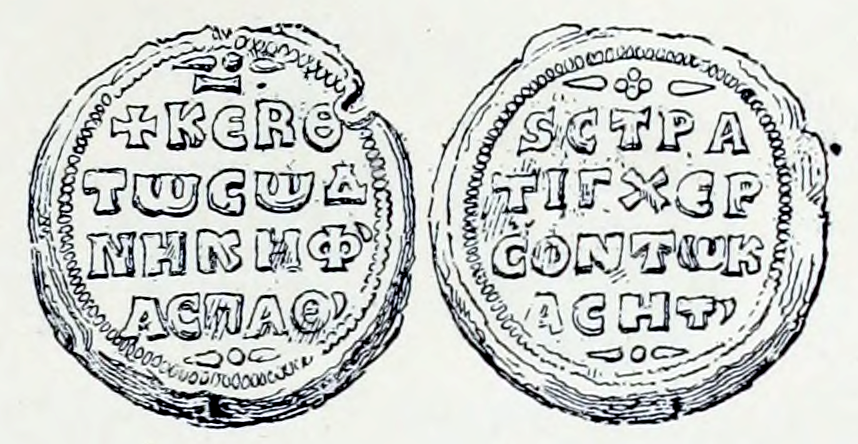
Seal of Nikephoros Kassiteras, protospatharios and strategos of Cherson

The Theme of Cherson appears to have been organized in typical fashion, with the full array of thematic officials, of whom a tourmarches of Gothia is known at the turn of the 11th century, as well as the ubiquitous fiscal and customs officials known as kommerkiarioi. The cities of the theme, however, appear to have retained considerable autonomy in their own government, as exemplified by Cherson itself, which was administered by the local magnates (archontes) under a proteuon ("the first"). Cherson also retained the right to issue its own coins, having resumed minting under Emperor Michael III (r. 842–867), and was for a long time the only provincial mint outside Constantinople. Its autonomy is also evidenced by the fact that the imperial government paid annual subsidies (pakta) to the city leaders in the fashion of allied rulers, and in the advice of Emperor Constantine Porphyrogennetos (r. 913–959) in his De Administrando Imperio to the local strategos concerning the possibility of a revolt in the city: he was to cease payment of the subsidies and relocate to some other city in the theme. In the late 11th century, the theme was governed by a katepano.

== Sources ==
- Ajbabin, Aleksandr I. (2011). Archäologie und Geschichte der Krim in byzantinischer Zeit. Monographien des Römisch-Germanischen Zentralmuseums. Vol. 98. Mainz: Verlag des Römisch-Germanischen Zentralmuseums. ISBN 978-3-88467-188-7.
- Albrecht, Stefan (2013). Quellen zur Geschichte der byzantinischen Krim. Monographien des Römisch-Germanischen Zentralmuseums. Vol. 101. Mainz: Verlag des Römisch-Germanischen Zentralmuseums. ISBN 978-3-88467-197-9.
- Kazhdan, Alexander, ed. (1991). The Oxford Dictionary of Byzantium. Oxford and New York: Oxford University Press. ISBN 0-19-504652-8.
- Nesbitt, John; Oikonomides, Nicolas, eds. (1991). Catalogue of Byzantine Seals at Dumbarton Oaks and in the Fogg Museum of Art, Volume 1: Italy, North of the Balkans, North of the Black Sea. Vol. 1. Washington, DC: Dumbarton Oaks Research Library and Collection. ISBN 0-88402-194-7.
- Nystazopoulou-Pélékidou, Marie (1998). "L'administration locale de Cherson à l'époque byzantine (IV^{e}-XII^{e} s.)". ΕΥΨΥΧΙΑ. Mélanges offerts à Hélène Ahrweiler. Paris: Éditions de la Sorbonne. pp. 567–579. ISBN 9782859448301.
- Papageorgiou, Angeliki (2008). "Theme of Cherson (Klimata)". Encyclopaedia of the Hellenic World, Black Sea. Foundation of the Hellenic World. Archived from the original on 11 November 2013.
- Pertusi, A. (1952). Constantino Porfirogenito: De Thematibus (in Italian). Rome: Biblioteca Apostolica Vaticana.
