= Petronas Kamateros =

Petronas Kamateros (Greek: Πετρωνᾶς Καματηρός, fl. 830s) was a Byzantine official under Emperor Theophilos (r. 829–842). Petronas is the first attested member of the Kamateros family. In ca. 833 or, according to more recent dating, 839, he held the rank of spatharokandidatos and was sent by Theophilos to supervise the construction of Sarkel, a fortified city that was to serve as capital for the Khazars, who were allies of Byzantium. On his return, Petronas reportedly advised the emperor to pay more attention to the Crimea and its cities, where Byzantine control was loose. In reply, Theophilos raised him to protospatharios and appointed him strategos in Cherson, thus founding the theme of the same name. It may be possible that he also held the office of genikos logothetes, based on a seal found at Cherson.

== Sources ==
- Kazhdan, Alexander (1991). "Kamateros". In Kazhdan, Alexander (ed.). The Oxford Dictionary of Byzantium. Oxford and New York: Oxford University Press. p. 1098. ISBN 0-19-504652-8.
- Winkelmann, Friedhelm; Lilie, Ralph-Johannes; et al. (1998). "Petronas (#5927)". Prosopographie der mittelbyzantinischen Zeit: I. Abteilung (641–867), 3. Band: Leon (#4271) – Placentius (#6265) (in German). Walter de Gruyter. p. 563. ISBN 978-3-11-016673-6.
