= Nikephoros Chrysoberges =

Nikephoros Chrysoberges (Greek: Νικηφόρος Χρυσοβέργης; ca. 1160 – probably after 1213) was a Byzantine rhetorician and metropolitan bishop of Sardis.

He was born most likely ca. 1160, or, according to a different view, in 1142. As a protégé of Constantine Mesopotamites, he succeeded in being appointed teacher (didaskalos) at the Patriarchal School of Hagia Sophia ca. 1186. In the 1190s, he apparently fell into disgrace, but recovered his position with his appointment to the senior post of magistros ton rhetoron ("master of the rhetoricians") in 1200, a post which he held until ca. 1204, when he succeeded his uncle as metropolitan of Sardis. He died probably after 1213.

In his capacity as magistros ton rhetoron, he produced official panegyric speeches in honour of emperors Alexios III Angelos (r. 1195–1203), Alexios IV Angelos (r. 1203–04), and the Patriarch of Constantinople John X Kamateros. According to Alexander Kazhdan, "both his political views and literary principles were traditional and conventional. He praised imperial power but [...] remained unimpressed by military prowess". The Byzantines' troubled relation with the Italian maritime republics plays an important role in Chrysoberges' rhetoric.

== Sources ==
- Kazhdan, Alexander (1991). "Chrysoberges, Nikephoros". In Kazhdan, Alexander (ed.). The Oxford Dictionary of Byzantium. Oxford and New York: Oxford University Press. p. 451. ISBN 0-19-504652-8.
