= Michael Glykas =

Byzantine Greek polymath

Michael Glykas or Glycas (Greek: Μιχαὴλ Γλυκᾶς) was a 12th-century Byzantine historian, theologian, mathematician, astronomer and poet. He was probably from Corfu and lived in Constantinople. He was a critic of Manuel I Komnenos, and was imprisoned and blinded due to his participation in a conspiracy against the emperor. He is also identified by modern scholarship with Michael Sikidites (Μιχαὴλ Σικιδίτης), who was condemned as a heresiarch in 1200.

== Life ==
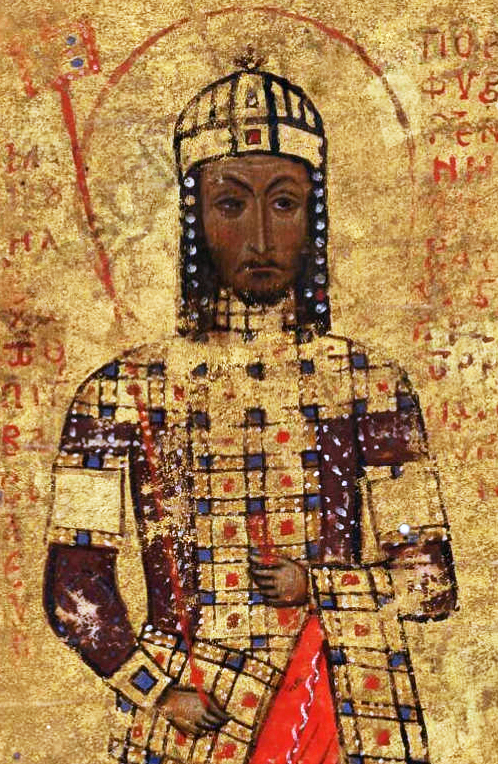
Manuscript miniature of Manuel I Komnenos, Vatican Library

Glykas was born sometime in the first third of the 12th century, possibly c. 1130. His probable birthplace was Corfu.

He served as imperial secretary (grammatikos) under Emperor Manuel I Komnenos (r. 1143–1180), before being involved in a conspiracy against the emperor and being blinded. The blinding was probably partial or slight, since he continued his literary activity. The exact nature of this conspiracy is unknown, but Otto Kresten suggested a connection with the alleged conspiracy that led to the downfall of Manuel's chief minister Theodore Styppeiotes in 1158/9. He remained imprisoned until at least 1164, and his subsequent fate is unknown. Modern scholars commonly support his identity with a certain Michael Sikidites, charged with heresy and magic in c. 1200.

According to Niketas Choniates, this Sikidites "was enrolled among the imperial secretaries" of Manuel I, was known of performing magic spells, conjuring serpents and demons. He preached a doctrine according to which the sacraments of the Eucharist were mortal and corruptible, as Christ's own body was. Furthermore, Sikidites and his followers considered a bodily resurrection impossible, and thought that the dead would be resurrected as ghostly spirits only. The doctrine appears to have enjoyed some support in leading circles, notably of the Patriarchs of Constantinople George II Xiphilinos and John X Kamateros, but also aroused passionate opposition; in a synod in 1200, Sikidites was censured and his teachings declared heretical.

== Works ==
His first known work were his Verses from Prison, a poem of 581 lines in political verse, written during his imprisonment. It contains many elements of the vernacular Greek language of his time (an early form of Modern Greek), in contrast to the highly stylized and archaic Attic Greek favoured by Byzantine intellectuals. In 1164/65, he composed an encomium celebrating Emperor Manuel's Hungarian campaign. He also wrote a mathematical treatise on the distinction between astronomy and astrology, where he severely criticised Manuel I for his fondness for the latter; in the same vein, Glykas strongly rejected the concept of inevitable fate (ananke) as a force in history.

His chief work is his chronicle (βίβλος χρονική, biblos chronike) of events from the creation of the world to the death of Alexios I Komnenos in 1118. His main sources for the chronicle were George Monachos, John Skylitzes and his continuators, John Zonaras, and Constantine Manasses. Over half the work is dedicated to the narrative of the creation and early Jewish history. As a historical source, it contains no new information, but Glykas displays his opposition to the Komnenian dynasty, and emulates Zonaras in his criticism of Alexios I.

Another notable work, which led Hans-Georg Beck to describe Glykas as the "most original and vivid exegete of the 12th century", was the collection of 95 replies on theological questions (Εἰς τὰς ἀπορίας τῆς Θείας Γραφῆς κεφάλαια, Chapters on the questions on the Holy Scripture), written in letter form. Among them is a letter where he criticises Manuel I for his incorrect use of passages from the Church Fathers.

His surviving work, including his letters, is "overtly didactic", promoting Christian virtues, and making extensive use of proverbs to this end.

=== Editions ===
- J.-P. Migne, Michael Glyca opera omnia, Paris, 1866 (in Latin)
- Michael Glycas, Annales, I. Bekker (ed.), Bonn, 1836 (in Latin)
- Michael Glykas, Εἰς τὰς ἀπορίας τῆς Θείας Γραφῆς κεφάλαια, S. Eustratiadis (ed.), vol. I, Athens, 1906; vol. II, Alexandria, 1912. (in Greek)
- Giovanni Mercati (ed.), Opere minori, Biblioteca apostolica vaticana, Vatican, 1937 (vol. I, p. 426). (in Italian)
- Émile Legrand (translator), Bibliothèque grecque vulgaire, Paris, 1881 (vol. I, French translation of his Verses from Prison). (in French)
- Raffaele Cantarella (translator), Poeti bizantini, Rizzoli, Milan, 2000 (vol. II, p. 228). (in Italian)
