= Michael Stypiotes =

Byzantine nobleman and military commander

Michael Stypiotes (Greek: Μιχαὴλ Στυπειώτης) was a Byzantine nobleman and military commander of the early 12th century.

According to Anna Komnene's Alexiad, he was a member of the high nobility of the Byzantine Empire, and famous for some time as a valiant soldier. Nevertheless he only appears in her history during the campaign of her father, Emperor Alexios I Komnenos (r. 1081–1118), against the Seljuk Turks in 1116. During this campaign, Stypiotes and a certain Strabobasilos set an ambush and destroyed a Turkish force. Later, the emperor commanded Stypiotes to campaign in the area of Amorion. Soon after he managed to recapture the fortress of Poimanenon.

His career under Alexios' successor John II Komnenos (r. 1118–1143) is unknown, but he is identified with the Stypiotes mentioned in the typikon of the Pantokrator Monastery. Since the latter was closely associated with the ruling Komnenos dynasty, it appears that Stypiotes enjoyed a distinguished position under John. He died some time before 1136, the date of the typikon.

== Sources ==
- Skoulatos, Basile (1980). Les personnages byzantins de l'Alexiade: Analyse prosopographique et synthèse [The Byzantine Personalities of the Alexiad: Prosopographical Analysis and Synthesis] (in French). Louvain-la-Neuve and Louvain: Bureau du Recueil Collège Érasme and Éditions Nauwelaerts. OCLC 8468871.
