= Semikarakorsk Fortress =

Early medieval Khazar fortification

- Interactive map of Semikarakorsk Fortress
- 47.5281°N 40.8004°E
- Type: Fortification
- Cultures: Khazar
- Location: Russia
- Region: Rostov Oblast, Russia

History
- Built: end of the 9th century
- Built by: Khazars

Site notes
- Excavation dates: 1970s

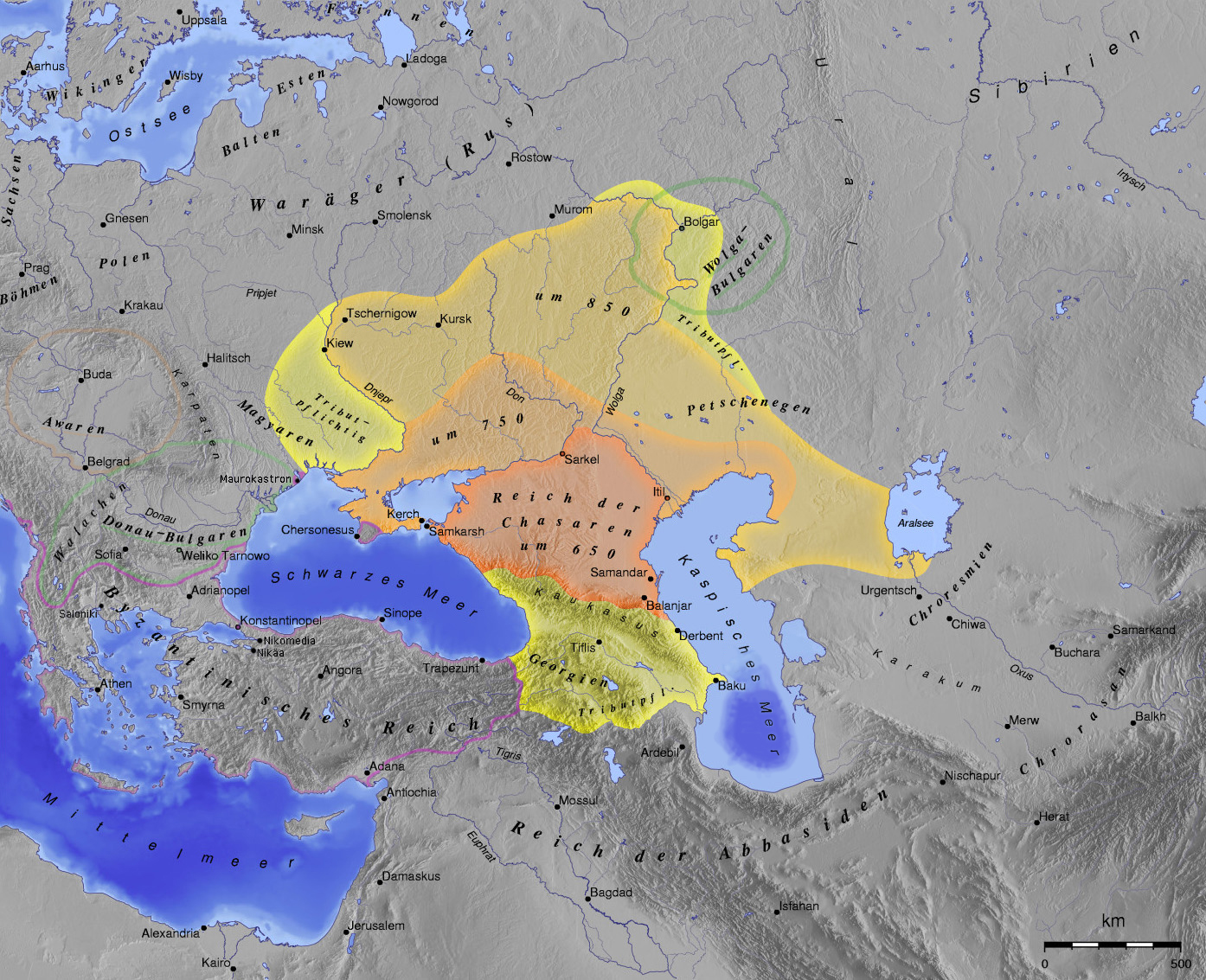
Map of the Khazar Khaganate in 650

Semikarakorsk Fortress (Russian: Семикаракорская крепость) was an early medieval Khazar fortification situated near the city of Semikarakorsk (Rostov Oblast, Russia).

== History and description ==
An early medieval Khazar fortress in Rostov Oblast near the city of Semikarakorsk was built in the late 8th - early 9th century. It was situated on the island hill near Semikarakorsk. The island itself is located at the Sal River.

The fortress was a residence of Khazar Khagans on the Lower Don, and it was four times larger than the Mayatskoye archaeological site -- a well-known fortress of the same period.

In 1971-1974, archaeological excavations were carried out in the area. It was discovered that the fortress was built according to the "square in square" system, had a wall-sized 215 x 200 m and a citadel inside of it measuring 85 x 80 meters. The fortified city also was of great commercial importance.

The fortress and citadel with a total length of six-meter walls almost a kilometer in length was a prominent achievement of the Khazar Khaganate. The fortress's and the citadel's walls were constructed of about 2 million pieces of bricks.

Raw brick of high quality was used as a building material. The dimensions of the bricks were 25 x 25 x 5 cm. The fortress walls have been preserved to the height of up to one meter, and the main tower, the donjon - up to a two-meter height. With a wall thickness of about 2 meters, the maximum height of the walls could reach 5–6 meters. Archaeologists first assumed that the houses inside the fortress were also built of raw bricks, but later it turned out that there were houses of burned bricks. Because of this, it is assumed that the fortress was intended to be a residence for the Khagans: since only they lived in brick houses.

In 2011, archaeologists under the leadership of Irina Arzhantseva from the Institute of Anthropology and Ethnography of the Russian Academy of Sciences began studying the site of the fortress.

== See also ==
- Golden Hills (Russia)
