= Kanikleios =

Office of the Byzantine empire

The kanikleios (Greek: κανίκλειος), more formally chartoularios tou kanikleiou or epi tou kanikleiou (Greek: [χαρτουλάριος] ἐπὶ τοῦ κανικλείου) was one of the most senior offices in the Byzantine imperial chancery. Its holder was the keeper of the imperial inkstand, the kanikleion, which was shaped as a little dog (Latin: canicula) and contained the scarlet ink with which the Byzantine emperor signed state documents. The office first appears in the 9th century, and was usually held in tandem with other government offices. In the Kletorologion of 899 it is ranked among the "special dignities" (ἀξίαι εἰδικαί, axiai eidikai), following the synkellos and preceding the protostrator. In the overall order of precedence, he ranked behind the chartoularios tou vestiariou and before the protostrator, and is recorded as usually holding the rank of protospatharios.

His proximity to the imperial person and the nature of his task made the kanikleios very influential, especially in formulating imperial chrysobulls. The office was often given to trusted aides by the emperors, who functioned as effective chief ministers: most notably Theoktistos under Michael III (r. 842–867), Nikephoros Ouranos in the early reign of Basil II (r. 976–1025), the powerful Theodore Styppeiotes under Manuel I Komnenos (r. 1143–1180), Nikephoros Alyates under John III Vatatzes (r. 1221–1254) and Michael VIII (r. 1259–1261), and the scholar Nikephoros Choumnos, who also held the post of prime minister (mesazōn), under Andronikos II Palaiologos (r. 1282–1328). The last recorded holder of this office was Alexios Palaiologos Tzamplakon c. 1438.

In Constantinople, there also was a quarter on the shore of the Golden Horn named ta Kanikleiou, which took its name from the palatial residence built there by Theoktistos.

== Sources ==
- Angelov, Dimiter (2007). Imperial Ideology and Political Thought in Byzantium (1204-1330). Cambridge: Cambridge University Press. ISBN 0-521-85703-1.
- Bury, John Bagnell (1911). The Imperial Administrative System of the Ninth Century - With a Revised Text of the Kletorologion of Philotheos. London: Oxford University Press.
- Holmes, Catherine (2005). Basil II and the Governance of Empire (976–1025). Oxford, United Kingdom: Oxford University Press. ISBN 978-0-19-927968-5.
- Kazhdan, Alexander, ed. (1991). The Oxford Dictionary of Byzantium. Oxford and New York: Oxford University Press. ISBN 0-19-504652-8.
- Magdalino, Paul (2002) [1993]. The Empire of Manuel I Komnenos, 1143–1180. Cambridge: Cambridge University Press. ISBN 0-521-52653-1.
- Talbot, Alice-Mary (1998). Byzantine Defenders of Images: Eight Saints' Lives in English Translation. Washington, DC: Dumbarton Oaks. ISBN 978-0-88402-259-6.
