= Epi ton deeseon =

Byzantine Empire office

The epi tōn deēseōn (Ancient Greek: ὁ ἐπὶ τῶν δεήσεων, lit. 'the one in charge of petitions') was a Byzantine office, whose holder was responsible for receiving and answering petitions to the Byzantine emperor and other Byzantine officials.

The office is usually considered by modern scholars, such as J. B. Bury, as the direct continuation of the late Roman magister memoriae, but this identification is not certain. The title is first attested in a 7th-century seal. In the lists of precedence like the Kletorologion of 899, he was counted among the judicial officials (kritai). In the Taktikon Uspensky of c. 842, its holders had the lowly court rank of spatharios, and did not rise above prōtospatharios until the mid-11th century. From the latter half of the 11th century however and during the 12th, the office rose much in importance, with its holders receiving higher titles and being drawn from among the Empire's most senior noble families. The last named holder, George Chatzikes, is attested in 1321, but the office is still mentioned as active decades later by Pseudo-Kodinos.

It is unknown if he had a dedicated staff, or what its composition may have been; it is absent in the Kletorologion, but a seal of a probably subordinate "notary of the petitions" (notarios tōn deēseōn) is known.

Seals also attest to the existence of provincial officials titled epi tōn deēseōn, among others in Sicily and the Peloponnese, as well as for the Patriarch of Constantinople.

== Sources ==
- Bury, J. B. (1911). The Imperial Administrative System of the Ninth Century – With a Revised Text of the Kletorologion of Philotheos. London: Oxford University Press. OCLC 1046639111.
- Kazhdan, Alexander (1991). "Epi ton deeseon". In Kazhdan, Alexander (ed.). The Oxford Dictionary of Byzantium. Oxford and New York: Oxford University Press. p. 724. ISBN 0-19-504652-8.
- Oikonomides, Nicolas (1972). Les listes de préséance byzantines des IXe et Xe siècles (in French). Paris: Éditions CNRS. p. 322.
- Verpeaux, Jean, ed. (1966). Pseudo-Kodinos, Traité des Offices (in French). Centre National de la Recherche Scientifique.
