= Basil Doukas Kamateros =

Byzantine noble

Basil Doukas Kamateros (Greek: Βασίλειος Δούκας Καματηρός) was a Byzantine aristocrat and senior official.

Basil was the son of the official and theologian Andronikos Doukas Kamateros, and brother of Empress Euphrosyne Doukaina Kamatera, wife of Alexios III Angelos (r. 1195–1203). A relative of the imperial family—his grandmother Irene Doukaina was probably a daughter of the protostrator Michael Doukas, brother-in-law of Alexios I Komnenos (r. 1081–1118)—he held the high rank of sebastos, and by 1166 held the office of protonotarios. By 1182 he had advanced to the post of logothetes tou dromou, but was dismissed, blinded (apparently only in one eye), and banished to Russia when Andronikos I Komnenos (r. 1182–1185) took power.

He returned to Constantinople and was again logothetes tou dromou under Isaac II Angelos (r. 1185–1195), and remained active at court under his brother-in-law Alexios III. After the Fourth Crusade he fled to the Empire of Nicaea, established by his nephew Theodore I Laskaris, who in 1209/10 sent him on an embassy to the King of Armenian Cilicia, Leo I.

== Sources ==
- Kazhdan, Alexander, ed. (1991). The Oxford Dictionary of Byzantium. Oxford and New York: Oxford University Press. ISBN 0-19-504652-8.
- Polemis, Demetrios I. (1968). The Doukai: A Contribution to Byzantine Prosopography. London: The Athlone Press.
