= Nicholas Kallikles =

Greek physician & poet

Nicholas Kallikles (Greek: Νικόλαος Καλλικλῆς, romanized: Nikólaos Kalliklēs) was a prominent Greek physician and a leading court poet active in the Byzantine court in Constantinople during the reigns of Alexios I Komnenos (r. 1081–1118) and John II Komnenos (r. 1118–1143).

== Biography ==
Very little is known about Kallikles's life. What information we have comes from a short mention in the Alexiad of Anna Komnene, his correspondence with Theophylact of Ohrid and his own poems. He was a well-known physician at the imperial court already before 1108. In 1118, he was one of the doctors attending Alexios I during his final illness. According to the Alexiad (XV.11.3), Kallikles was the only one to discern the gravity of the emperor's situation and to suggest the use of purgatives. As his colleagues were opposed to this, his advice was not followed.

From his correspondence with Theophylact, Kallikles appears as a very learned and cultivated man, and was in possession of a fine library. As a court poet, he was, along with his contemporary Theodore Prodromos, the major exponent of the genre of poetic panegyrics praising the Komnenian system's leading aristocrats: his major themes are their wealth and noble descent. He also dedicated poems to individual artifacts such as icons, and a number of reliquary inscriptions are attributed to him.

The date of his death is unknown. His latest known composition is an epitaph for John II, which was composed before the emperor's actual death, probably circa 1142.

== Sources ==
- Kazhdan, Alexander (1991). "Kallikles, Nicholas". In Kazhdan, Alexander (ed.). The Oxford Dictionary of Byzantium. Oxford and New York: Oxford University Press. p. 1093. ISBN 0-19-504652-8.
- Skoulatos, Basile (1980). Les personnages byzantins de l'Alexiade: Analyse prosopographique et synthèse [The Byzantine Personalities of the Alexiad: Prosopographical Analysis and Synthesis] (in French). Louvain-la-Neuve and Louvain: Bureau du Recueil Collège Érasme and Éditions Nauwelaerts.
