= Euphrosyne Doukaina Kamatera =

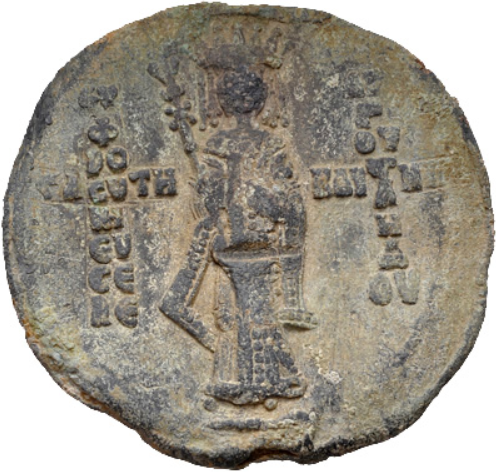
- Seal of Euphrosyne Doukaina Kamatera

Empress consort of the Byzantine Empire
- Tenure: 1195–1203
- Born: c. 1155
- Died: 1211
- Spouse: Alexios III Angelos
- Issue: Irene Angelina; Anna Angelina; Eudokia Angelina
- House: Doukas
- Father: Andronikos Doukas Kamateros
- Mother: ... Kantakouzene

Euphrosyne Doukaina Kamaterina or better Kamatera (Greek: Εὐφροσύνη Δούκαινα Καματερίνα, romanized: Effrosýni Doúkaina Kamaterína, or Καματηρά [Kamatirá], c. 1155 – 1211) was a Byzantine Empress by marriage to the Byzantine Emperor Alexios III Angelos.

Euphrosyne was the daughter of Andronikos Doukas Kamateros, a high-ranking official who held the titles of megas droungarios and pansebastos and his wife, an unknown Kantakouzene. She was related to the Emperor Constantine X and Irene Doukaina, empress of Alexios I Komnenos. Both of her brothers had rebelled against Andronikos I Komnenos; one was imprisoned and the other was blinded.

== Life ==
Euphrosyne married Alexios Angelos, the older brother of the future Emperor Isaac II Angelos in c. 1169 CE. Although Isaac II bestowed many titles and honors upon his brother, Alexios seized the throne on April 8, 1195, deposing Isaac and proclaiming himself emperor. In this he was assisted by Euphrosyne, who had organized a party of aristocratic supporters. Euphrosyne took control of the palace and quelled the opposition herself, securing the accession of her husband to the throne by wholesale bribery.

Euphrosyne was recognised as the true power behind the throne. Intelligent, determined, skilled in communication and organization, she had a talent for politics, and virtually ruled the Empire in the name of Alexios III, who had a reputation for being concerned primarily with pleasure and idle pursuits. She issued commands herself and even altered Alexios' decrees when it suited her, and secured the recall of the capable minister Constantine Mesopotamites.

Euphrosyne and Alexios were criticized for their love of finery and the enrichment of their relatives at state expense. Her own brother, Basil Kamateros, and her son-in-law, Andronikos Kontostephanos, possibly driven by anger at her apparent curtailing of overall familial power, accused Euphrosyne of adultery with one of her ministers, a nobleman named Vatatzes. Alexios III believed the allegations and had Vatatzes executed. Euphrosyne was stripped of her imperial robes and banished to a convent at Nematarea in October 1196. However, her relatives convinced Alexios to reinstate her, and she was recalled six months later in spring 1197.

In 1203, faced with the Fourth Crusade and the return of his nephew, Alexios IV Angelos, Alexios III fled Constantinople with a magnificent treasure and some female relatives, including his daughter Irene. Euphrosyne was left behind and was immediately imprisoned by the new regime. Alexios IV was soon strangled by Alexios Doukas Mourtzouphlos, the lover of Euphrosyne's daughter Eudokia, who then proclaimed himself emperor as Alexios V. In April 1204 Euphrosyne fled the city along with her daughter and Alexios V, and they made their way to Mosynopolis, where Euphrosyne's husband Alexios III had taken refuge. Alexios III had Alexios V blinded and abandoned to the crusaders, who had him executed.

Euphrosyne and Alexios III fled across Greece to Thessalonica and Corinth, but were finally captured by Boniface of Montferrat and imprisoned. In 1209 or 1210 they were ransomed by their cousin Michael I of Epirus, and Euphrosyne spent the remainder of her life in Arta. She died in 1210 or 1211.

== Family ==
By her husband, Alexios III Angelos, Euphrosyne had three daughters:

1. Irene Angelina, who married (1) Andronikos Kontostephanos; (2) Alexios Palaiologos, by whom she was the grandmother of Emperor Michael VIII Palaiologos.
2. Anna Angelina, who married (1) the sebastokratōr Isaac Komnenos, great-nephew of Emperor Manuel I Komnenos; (2) Emperor Theodore I Laskaris of Nicaea.
3. Eudokia Angelina, who married (1) King Stefan I Prvovenčani of Serbia; (2) Emperor Alexios V Doukas; (3) Leo Sgouros, ruler of Corinth.

== Sources ==
- The Oxford Dictionary of Byzantium, Oxford University Press, 1991
- Garland, Lynda. Byzantine Empresses, 1999
- Herrin, Judith (2001). Women in Purple: Rulers of Medieval Byzantium. London: Phoenix Press. ISBN 1-84212-529-X.

Euphrosyne Doukaina Kamatera Doukas Born: c. 1155 Died: 1211
Royal titles
Preceded by Margaret of Hungary	Byzantine Empress consort 1195–1203	Succeeded by Margaret of Hungary
