= Michael Doukas (protostrator) =

- Born: ca. 1061
- Died: before 1117
- Relatives: John Doukas (brother)
- Military career
- Allegiance: Byzantine Empire
- Rank: protostrator
- Conflicts: Byzantine–Norman wars, Battle of Levounion

Michael Doukas (Greek: Μιχαήλ Δούκας, c.1061 – before 1117) was a member of the Doukas family, a relative of the Emperor Alexios I Komnenos (r. 1081–1118) and a senior military figure, with the rank of protostrator, during Alexios's reign. His life is only known through the Alexiad of Anna Komnene and the history of her husband, Nikephoros Bryennios.

== Biography ==
Michael Doukas was born circa 1061, the eldest son of the domestikos ton scholon Andronikos Doukas, son of the Caesar John Doukas, and his wife, Maria of Bulgaria, the granddaughter of Tsar Ivan Vladislav of Bulgaria. Michael was thus the brother-in-law of Alexios I Komnenos, who had married his sister Irene Doukaina. In 1074, during the rebellion of the Norman mercenary Roussel de Bailleul, Michael and his younger brother John were at the estates of the Caesar John Doukas in Bithynia. Roussel demanded that the Caesar give up the two as hostages in return for releasing their wounded father, whom he held captive. The Caesar agreed, and the two were imprisoned by Roussel. The slave servants of the two boys managed to persuade a local peasant to help them escape and lead them to Nicomedia, but in the event, only Michael with his eunuch pedagogue Leontakios managed to escape and reach safety. His brother John remained behind, until he was liberated after Roussel's defeat later in the year.

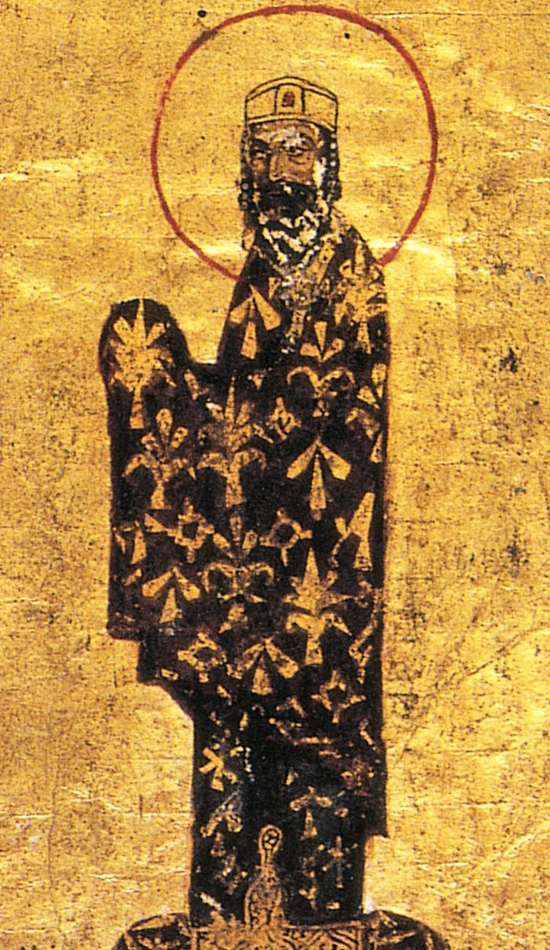
Miniature of the Emperor Alexios I Komnenos (r. 1081–1118).

In 1078, he played a crucial role in the marriage of Nikephoros III Botaneiates (r. 1078–1081) to the Empress Maria of Alania. The marriage was against canon law, as she was still married to the recently deposed emperor Michael VII Doukas (r. 1071–1078), but on the instructions of his grandfather the Caesar, Michael procured a priest willing to conduct the ceremony. In 1081, when Alexios Komnenos rebelled against Botaneiates, Michael accompanied the Caesar to Alexios's camp at Schiza. There, they supported Alexios's candidacy for the Byzantine throne against his elder brother Isaac Komnenos. After Alexios's successful accession to the throne, Michael was rewarded with the title of sebastos and the office of protostrator, one of the Byzantine Empire's highest military positions.

In 1083, he participated in the campaign in Thessaly against the Normans under Bohemund, commanding the heavy infantry. He was defeated in battle by Bohemund near Larissa, and his army scattered. Four years later, he participated in the failed expedition against the Pechenegs in Bulgaria, and urged the emperor Alexios to flee after the Byzantine defeat at Dorystolon. During the flight, Michael's horse slipped and he fell, but a soldier gave him his own horse, allowing him to rejoin the emperor's party. A few years later, however, in 1091, he participated in the final victory over the Pechenegs at the Battle of Levounion.

After that, he is recorded as having attended the synod of 1094 that condemned Leo of Chalcedon, and in a letter during the Norman invasion of 1107–1108, according to which Michael was dispatched to Epirus to raise troops. He died after a prolonged illness on a 9 January. The year is unknown, however it was sometime before 1117 when he is listed as dead in the typikon of the Kecharitomene Monastery.

== Family ==
Through his marriage to an unnamed woman, he had several children. Only one is attested with certainty, Constantine Doukas, a sebastos and governor of the region of the Vardar river circa 1118. Demetrios I. Polemis further identifies two Doukas women as two of Michael's daughters. The first is a certain Theodora Doukaina, attested in an epigram as married to a Theodore. Polemis considers her as the mother of Euphrosyne Doukaina, Michael's granddaughter, whose father was also named Theodore. The second is Irene Doukaina, the wife of Gregory Kamateros, a man of humble origin who rose to high office under Alexios Komnenos and his successor, John II Komnenos (r. 1118–1143). Another daughter, married to a certain John, is unnamed, and it is possible that a poem by Nicholas Kallikles refers to another son.

== Sources ==
- Kazhdan, Alexander, ed. (1991). The Oxford Dictionary of Byzantium. Oxford and New York: Oxford University Press. ISBN 0-19-504652-8.
- Polemis, Demetrios I. (1968). The Doukai: A Contribution to Byzantine Prosopography. London: The Athlone Press.
- Skoulatos, Basile (1980). Les personnages byzantins de l'Alexiade: Analyse prosopographique et synthèse [The Byzantine Personalities of the Alexiad: Prosopographical Analysis and Synthesis] (in French). Louvain-la-Neuve and Louvain: Bureau du Recueil Collège Érasme and Éditions Nauwelaerts.
