= Sarkel =

Ruined fortress in Russia

- Sharkil
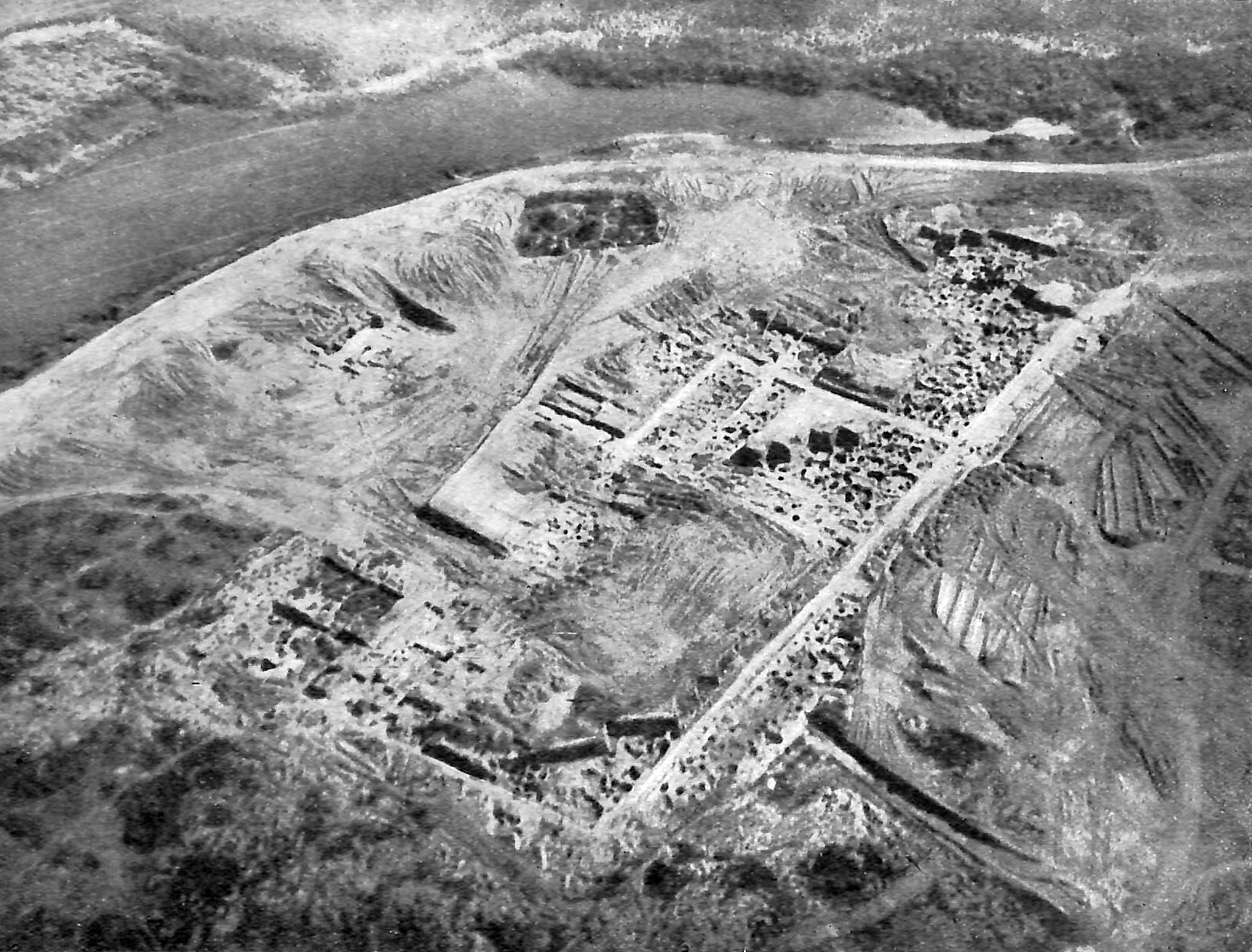
- Aerial photo of the excavations conducted at Sarkel in the 1930s.

- Location within European Russia Location within Rostov Oblast
- 47°42′18″N 42°16′23″E
- Type: Fortification
- Cultures: Khazar
- Location: Russia
- Region: Rostov Oblast

History
- Built: 830s
- Built by: Khazars, Byzantine Empire

Site notes
- Excavation dates: 1930s
- Archaeologists: Mikhail Artamonov
- Condition: Submerged by Tsimlyansk Reservoir

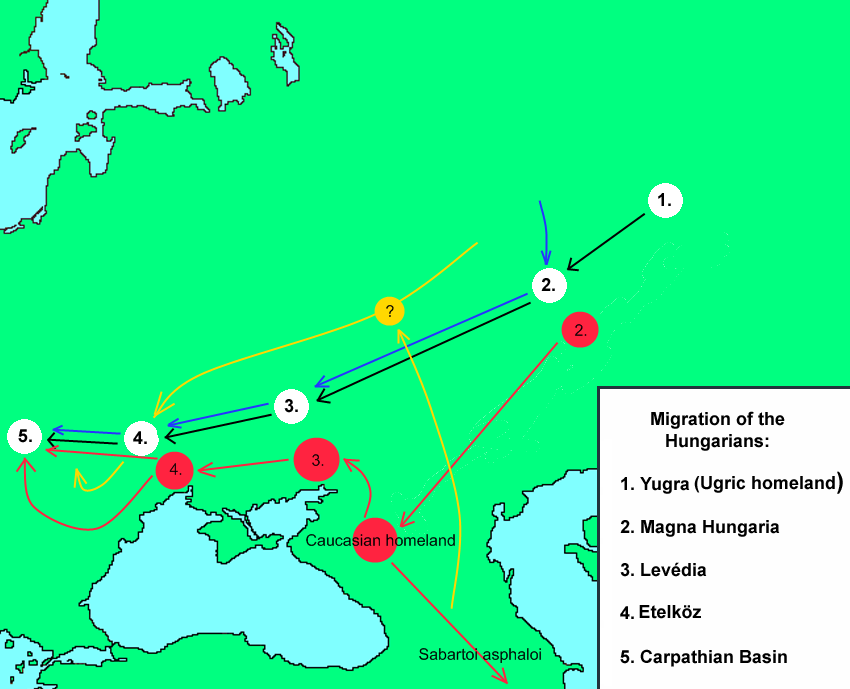
Migration of Hungarians

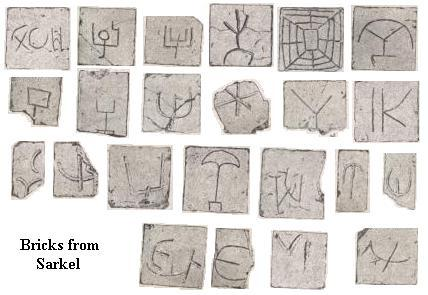
Turkic Tamgas on some of the bricks from Sarkel

Sarkel (or Šarkel, literally "white house" in the Khazar language) was a large limestone-and-brick fortress in what is now Rostov Oblast of Russia, on the left bank of the lower Don River.

It was built by the Khazars with Byzantine assistance in the 830s or 840s. It was named Sarkel, or 'white-house', because of the white limestone bricks used in its construction.

== Location ==
Sarkel was located on a hill, on the left bank of the Don River. It is currently under water, after the construction of the Tsimlyansk Reservoir. The left bank of the river was much lower, compared to the right, so a lot of it was flooded.

Across the Don River from Sarkel, on the right bank, there was located another large Khazar fortress roughly contemporary with Sarkel. This site is known as Pravoberezhnoye Tsimlyanskoye site, although its ancient name is unknown. It is still there, on the much higher right bank, although suffering from erosion because of encroaching water.

== Construction ==
Sarkel was built to protect the north-western border of the Khazar state in 833. The Khazars asked their ally, Byzantine emperor Theophilus, for engineers to build a fortified capital, and Theophilus sent his chief engineer Petronas Kamateros. In recompense for these services, the Khazar khagan ceded Chersonesos and some other Crimean dependencies to Byzantium.

Historians have been unable to determine why such a strong fortress was built on the Don. They generally assert that the costly construction must have been due to the rise of a strong regional power that posed a threat to the Khazars. Alexander Vasiliev and George Vernadsky, among others, argue that Sarkel was built to defend a vital portage between the Don and the Volga from the Rus' Khaganate. Other historians believe this polity was situated many hundred miles to the north. Another nascent power, the Hungarians, was not particularly threatening to the Khazars as long as they paid tribute to the khagan.

Constantine Porphyrogenitus records in his work De Administrando Imperio that the Khazars asked the Emperor Theophilos to have the fortress of Sarkel built for them. His record is connected to the Hungarians on the basis that the new fortress must have become necessary because of the appearance of a new enemy of the Khazars, and other peoples could not be taken into account as the Khazars’ enemies at that time. In the 10th century, a Persian explorer and geographer Ahmad ibn Rustah mentioned that the Khazars entrenched themselves against the attacks of the Hungarians.

== History ==
Principalities of Kievan Rus' (1054-1132).

The city served as a bustling commercial center, as it controlled the Volga-Don portage, which was used by the Rus to cross from the Black Sea to the Volga and thence to the Caspian and Baltic. The route was known as the "Khazarian Way". A garrison fortified at Sarkel included Oghuz and Pecheneg mercenaries.

Sarkel's fortress and city were captured by Kievan Rus' under prince Sviatoslav I in 965. The city was renamed Belaya Vezha (Slavic for White Tower or White Fortress) and settled by Slavs. It remained Slavic until the 12th century, when the district was taken over by the Kipchaks.

Mikhail Artamonov excavated the site in the 1930s. It was the most ambitious excavation of a Khazar site ever undertaken. Among many Khazar and Rus items, Artamonov discovered Byzantine columns used in the construction of Sarkel. The site is now submerged by the Tsimlyansk Reservoir, completed in 1952, so no further excavations may be conducted.

== See also ==
- Semikarakorsk Fortress
- Samosdelka
- Casablanca
