= Logothetes ton sekreton =

Byzantine treasury executive role

The logothetēs tōn sekretōn (Ancient Greek: λογοθέτης τῶν σεκρέτων) was an official supervising all the sekreta (fiscal departments) of the Byzantine Empire during the Komnenian period. In the early 13th century, his office evolved into the megas logothetes.

== History and functions ==
The post was first established by Emperor Alexios I Komnenos (r. 1081–1118), in an attempt to improve the coordination of the various departments (sekreta). The fiscal departments in particular were further grouped under two other officials: the two principal treasury departments, the genikon and eidikon, were put under the megas logariastēs tōn sekretōn (μέγας λογαριαστής τῶν σεκρέτων, "grand accountant of the sekreta"), while the megas logariastēs tōn euagōn sekretōn (μέγας λογαριαστής τῶν εὐαγῶν σεκρέτων) oversaw the "pious bureaux" (εὐαγή σεκρέτα, euagē sekreta), i.e. imperial estates and religious foundations. In the late 12th century, the logothetēs tōn sekretōn had become the megas logothetēs, an office which survived until the Fall of Constantinople in May 1453.

== Sources ==
- Guilland, Rodolphe (1971). "Les Logothètes: Etudes sur l'histoire administrative de l'Empire byzantin". Revue des études byzantines (in French). 29: 5–115. doi:10.3406/rebyz.1971.1441.
- Kazhdan, Alexander, ed. (1991). The Oxford Dictionary of Byzantium. New York and Oxford: Oxford University Press. ISBN 978-0-19-504652-6.
- Magdalino, Paul (2002) [1993]. The Empire of Manuel I Komnenos, 1143–1180. Cambridge: Cambridge University Press. ISBN 0-521-52653-1.
