= Paul Magdalino =

British academic

Paul Magdalino FBA
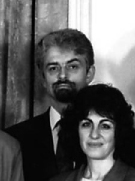
- Magdalino with his first wife, Ruth Macrides, in 1992
- Born: 10 May 1948
- Spouse: Ruth Macrides (pictured)
- Awards: Runciman Award (1993)

Academic background
- Education: Oriel College, Oxford
- Thesis: The History of Thessaly, 1266–1393 (1976)
- Doctoral advisor: Donald Nicol

Academic work
- Institutions: University of St Andrews (1977–2009); Koç University (2006–08, 2010–14)
- Main interests: Byzantine history; Intellectual history; Constantinople
- Notable works: The Empire of Manuel I Komnenos, 1143–1180

Paul Magdalino FBA (born 10 May 1948) is a British Byzantinist who is Bishop Wardlaw Professor (Emeritus) of Byzantine History at the University of St Andrews. He received the 1993 Runciman Award for his monograph on the reign of Manuel I Komnenos (1143–1180), which challenged Niketas Choniates' negative appraisal of the ruler.

== Biography ==
Magdalino was educated at the University of Oxford (BA 1970, DPhil 1976). He has worked as a lecturer and reader in mediaeval history at the University of St Andrews (1977–1999), where he became Professor of Byzantine History (1999–2002) and Bishop Wardlaw Professor of Byzantine History (2002–2009, later Emeritus), and as a professor of Byzantine history at Koç University, Istanbul (2006–2008, 2010–2014).

He is a fellow of the Dumbarton Oaks Center for Byzantine Studies, the Andrew W. Mellon Foundation in Early Christian Humanism, Catholic University of America, the Alexander-von-Humboldt Stipendium at Frankfurt and Munich, and the Humanities Research Centre at Australian National University. He is Directeur d'études invité, École des Hautes Études en Sciences Sociales, Directeur d’études invité, École pratique des Hautes Études, section des sciences religieuses.

He was a visiting professor of history at Harvard University in 1995–1996 and a Senior Fellow at Dumbarton Oaks in 2001–2007. In 2002 he was elected Fellow of the British Academy.

Magdalino is a member of several editorial boards and research committees: 'The Medieval Mediterranean' at Brill monograph series; 'Oxford Studies in Byzantium' at Oxford University Press; Committee for the British Academy project on the Prosopography of the Byzantine Empire; Senior Fellows Committee at Dumbarton Oaks Center for Byzantine Studies; La Pomme d’Or Publishing; Byzantinische Zeitschrift journal.

His research interests include Byzantine history: the society, culture and economy of the Byzantine world from 6th to 13th centuries; the city of Constantinople; prophecy, scientific thought, the formation of Byzantine religious Orthodoxy.

== Publications ==
=== Books as author ===
- (with Clive Foss) Rome and Byzantium (Oxford, 1976)
- Tradition and Transformation in Medieval Byzantium (Aldershot: Variorum, 1991) [reprints]
- The Empire of Manuel I Komnenos, 1143–1180 (Cambridge: Cambridge University Press, 1993), pp.xxvi+527, winner of the 1993 Runciman Award
- Constantinople médiévale. Études sur l'évolution des structures urbaines, Travaux et Mémoires, Monographies 9 (Paris, 1996) pp. 117; Serbian translation, Belgrade 2001
- The Byzantine Background to the First Crusade (Toronto: Canadian Institute of Balkan Studies, 1996) pp. 38
- L’orthodoxie des astrologues. La science entre le dogme et la divination à Byzance (VIIe-XIVe siècle), Réalités byzantines 12 (Paris, 2006), pp. 194
- Studies on the History and Topography of Byzantine Constantinople (Aldershot: Ashgate, 2007) [reprints]
- Roman Constantinople in Byzantine Perspective: The Memorial and Aesthetic Rediscovery of Constantine’s Beautiful City, from Late Antiquity to the Renaissance Studies on the History and Topography of Byzantine Constantinople (Leiden: Brill, 2024)

=== Books as editor ===
- The Perception of the Past in Twelfth-Century Europe (London, 1992) pp.x+240
- New Constantines: the Rhythm of Imperial Renewal in Byzantine History, 4th-13th Centuries (Aldershot, 1994) pp.x+312
- (with David Ricks) Byzantium and the Modern Greek Identity (Aldershot, 1998) pp.x+187
- Byzantium in the Year 1000 (Leiden, 2003), pp. xx+284
- (with Maria Mavroudi) The Occult Sciences in Byzantium (Geneva: La Pomme d'or, 2007) pp. 468
- (with Robert S. Nelson) The Old Testament in Byzantium (Cambridge, MA: Harvard University Press, 2010)
- (with Matteo Campagnolo, Marielle Martiniani-Reber and André-Louis Rey) L’aniconisme dans l’art religieux byzantin. Actes du colloque de Genève (1-3 octobre 2009) (Geneva: La Pomme d'or, 2009)
- The Incineration of New Babylon: The Fire Poem of Konstantinos Stilbes (Geneva: La Pomme d'or, 2015)
- (with Nina Ergin) Istanbul and Water (Leuven, 2015)
- (with Nevra Necipoğlu) Trade in Byzantium: Papers from the Third International Sevgi Gönül Byzantine Studies Symposium (Istanbul, 2016)
- (with Sabine Ladstätter) Ephesos from Late Antiquity until the Late Middle Ages (Vienna, 2019)
- (with Andrei Timotin) Savoirs prédictifs et techniques divinatoires de l'Antiquité tardive à Byzance (Seyssel: La Pomme d'or, 2019)
