= Niketas Choniates =

Byzantine historian and politician (c. 1155 – 1217)

Niketas Choniates Sebastos
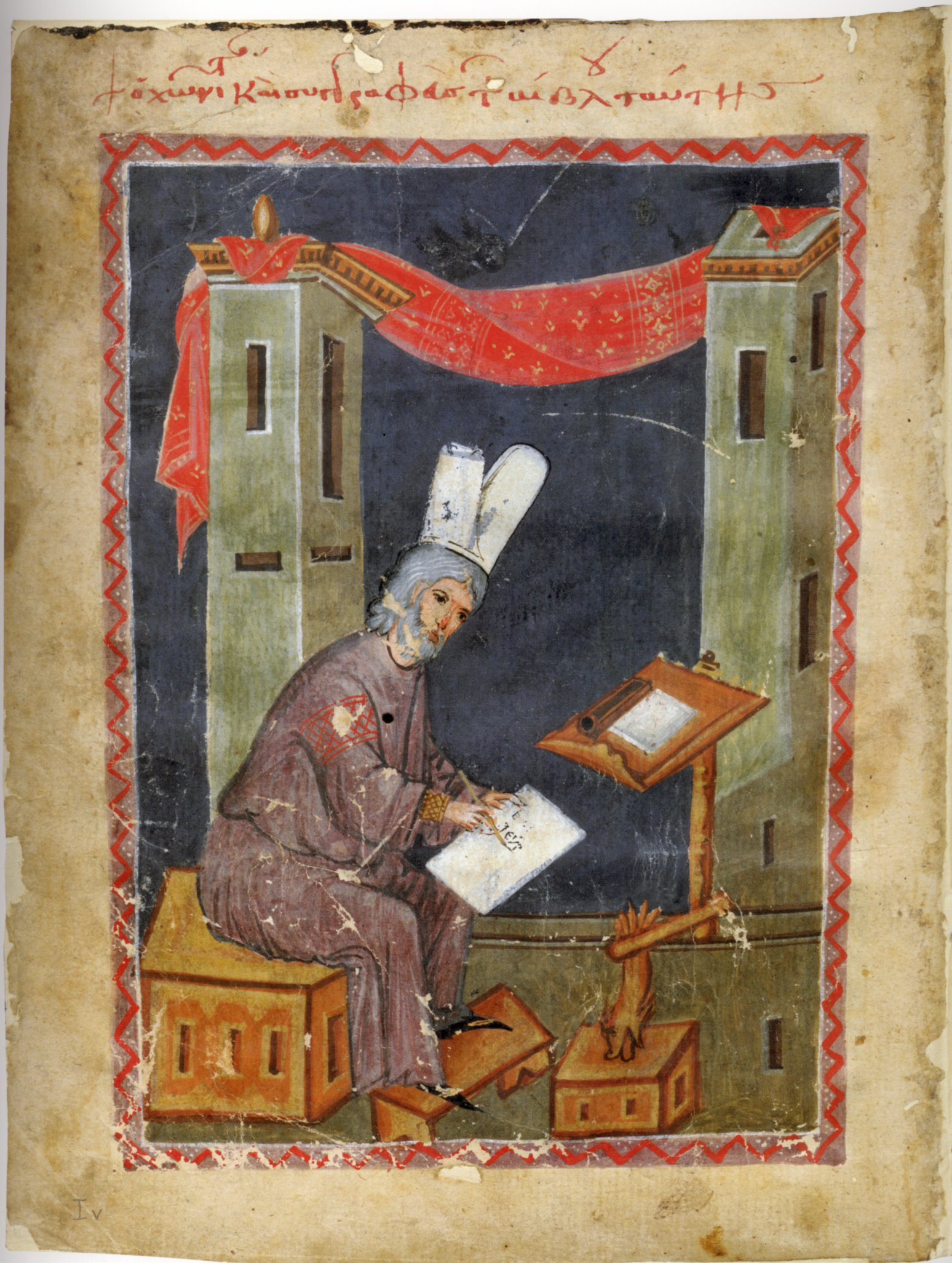
- Choniates in a medieval manuscript

Logothetes ton sekreton
- In office 1196/7 – February 1204
- Monarchs: Alexios III Angelos; Isaac II Angelos & Alexios IV Angelos
- Preceded by: John Belissariotes

Logothetes tou genikou
- In office c. 1195 – c. 1196
- Monarch: Alexios III Angelos

Epi ton kriseon
- In office c. 1194/5
- Monarch: Alexios III Angelos

Personal details
- Born: Niketas Akominatos c. 1155 Colossae, Byzantine Empire
- Died: 1217 Empire of Nicaea
- Relations: Michael Choniates (brother); John Belissariotes (brother-in-law)

Niketas or Nicetas Choniates (Medieval Greek: Νικήτας Χωνιάτης; c. 1155 – 1217) was a Byzantine Greek historian and politician. He is best known as an eyewitness biographer of the Sack of Constantinople, detailed in his work “Chronike diegesis," often published in English as "O City of Byzantium." This chronicle records history of the Eastern Roman Empire from 1118 to 1207.

== Life ==
Niketas Choniates was born in the city of Chonae (near the modern Honaz in Turkey) to a family of lesser nobility around 1155. While the Choniates family lacked the wealth of the Constantinopolitan aristocracy, his father had enough money to send Niketas and his brother Michael to Constantinople to receive an education in 1164. Here, Niketas was educated in rhetoric, literature, theology, law, and politics under the renowned John Mauropous. Niketas was deeply inspired by the works of Homer, Hesiod, and Plato, which he frequently integrated with Christian theology. Historian Harry Magoulias argues that Niketas was as fluent in these texts as he was with the Holy Scripture.

Niketas served in a number of prestigious administrative roles under the Angelos Dynasty. He began his career as a civil servant working as a junior tax official in the Province of Pontos around 1180, likely due to the connections afforded to him by his brother Micheal. From here, Niketas gained a number of other relatively minor administrative positions. In 1185, he became an imperial sanctuary under Isaakois II, where he gained a reputation as a remarkable orator.

In 1189, Niketas was elevated to Governor of Thrace under Isaakios II and was stationed at Philippolis. Niketas later lamented that the commands given to him by Emperor Isaakios II while he was in this position were illogical and contradictory. When the Holy Roman Emperor Frederick Barbarossa led his troops through the Balkans toward Palestine during the Third Crusade in August 1189, Isaakios II ordered Niketas to rebuild Philippolis’ fortifications. However, when the Crusader Host drew nearer, Niketas received a second command to tear down the newly built walls to prevent the Germans from occupying a fortified city. Niketas complied and fled the city with other officials just before its occupation. This incident led to Niketas presenting an unfavorable depiction of Isaakios II in his chronicle, accusing the emperor of incompetence, passivity, and over taxing his subjects. He further accused Isaakios II of provoking the occupation by imprisoning German ambassadors in Constantinople.

Unaware of this resentment, Isaakios appointed Niketas to Judge of the Velum in 1191. This was one of the highest magisterial offices in Constantinople, where Niketas was the head of a tribunal that handled civil law suits.

In 1194, Niketas held the most prestigious position in his political career, when he was elevated to “logothete tou genikou” under Alexios III, the highest position in the Byzantine civil service and the head of the senate. However, Niketas was dismissed from this position for unknown reasons by Alexios V following his ascension to the throne in early 1204. Niketas claimed to be arbitrarily dismissed without cause, and continued to serve in the senate.

Niketas’s primary place of residency was destroyed by the fire set by the Crusaders in August 1203, forcing him to move into a smaller home close to the Hagia Sophia. During the Sack of Constantinople, Niketas abandoned this house and hid in a small place owned by his Venetian friends while the sack occurred. On April 17, after much of the plundering had died down, Niketas fled Constantinople through the Golden Gate with his pregnant wife and the Patriarch John X Camaterus, carrying his infant son in his arms.

After the sack of Constantinople he fled to Nicaea, where he settled at the court of the Nicaean emperor Theodore I Lascaris, and devoted himself to literature. He died in 1217.

His theological work, Thesaurus Orthodoxae Fidei, although extant in a complete form in manuscripts, has been published only in part. It is one of the chief authorities for the heresies and heretical writers of the 12th century.

== Choniates in fiction ==
Umberto Eco's novel Baudolino is set partly at Constantinople during the Crusader conquest. The imaginary hero, Baudolino, saves Niketas during the sacking of Constantinople, and then proceeds to confide his life story to him.

Niketas is a major character in Alan Gordon's murder mystery A Death in the Venetian Quarter (New York: St. Martin's Minotaru, 2002).

== Editions and translations ==
- Imperii Graeci Historia, ed. Hieronymus Wolf, 1557, in Greek with parallel Latin translation. (PDF of 1593 reprint)
- Nicetæ Choniatæ Historia, ed. J. P. Migne (Patrologia Graeca vol. 140) reproduces Wolf's text (in more modern type) and translation (in standardized spelling). (PDF)
- Nicetae Choniatae Historia, ed. Immanuel Bekker, Bonn (CSHB), 1835, with Wolf's translation at the bottom of the page. (at the Internet Archive)
- Nicetae Choniatae Historia, ed. Jan Louis van Dieten, Berlin (CFHB #11), 1975 (ISBN 3110045281).
- O City of Byzantium: Annals of Niketas Choniates, trans. Harry J. Magoulias, 1984 (ISBN 0814317642). (PDF)
