= Faculty and alumni of the University of Constantinople =

This is a list of the notable faculty and alumni of the University of Constantinople.

== Faculty ==
- Anthemius of Tralles
- Stephen of Alexandria
- John Mauropous
- Patriarch Photius I of Constantinople taught Greek Philosophy.
- Saint Constantine-Cyril
- Maximus the Confessor
- Michael Psellos
- Simeon Seth
- John Argyropoulos
- John Italos
- Manuel Moschopoulos
- Eustratius of Nicaea
- Michael of Ephesus
- John Mauropous
- Michael Italikos
- Manuel Holobolos
- George Akropolites
- George of Cyprus
- Barlaam of Seminara
- Theodore Balsamon
- Leo the Mathematician
- Athanasios of Emesa
- Eustathius of Thessalonica
- John Chortasmenos

== Alumni ==
- Theoderic the Great
- Aspar
- Simeon I of Bulgaria
- Kubrat
- Béla III of Hungary
- Anna Komnene
- Maria of Alania
- Empress Irene
- Leo the Deacon
- Basilios Bessarion
- Michael Attaleiates
- Patriarch Nicholas III of Constantinople
- John of Biclaro
- Ioane Petritsi
- Ghazar Parpetsi
- Ephrem Mtsire
- Arsen of Ilqalto
- Peter the Iberian
- George the Hagiorite
- John Kukuzelis
- Stephen Uroš IV Dušan of Serbia
- Theophanes the Greek
- John Choumnos
- Michael Choniates
- John Pediasimos
- George Chionades
- Arethas of Caesarea
- Mark of Ephesus
