= John Xiphilinus =

John Xiphilinus or Xiphilinos may refer to:

- John VIII of Constantinople (died 1075), patriarch
- John Xiphilinus (historian) (11th century), nephew of prec., wrote an epitome of Cassius Dio

== See also ==
- Xiphilinus
