= Constantine Leichoudes =

Ecumenical Patriarch of Constantinople from 1059 to 1063

Saint Constantine III of Constantinople
- Ecumenical Patriarch of Constantinople
- Church: Church of Constantinople
- In office: 2 February 1059 – 9/10 August 1063
- Predecessor: Michael I of Constantinople
- Successor: John VIII of Constantinople

Personal details
- Born: Constantine Leichoudes Constantinople, Byzantine Empire
- Died: 9 or 10 August 1063
- Denomination: Eastern Orthodoxy

Education
- Academic advisor: John Mauropous

Philosophical work
- Institutions: University of Constantinople
- Main interests: Rhetoric

Constantine III of Constantinople (Greek: Κωνσταντῖνος Λειχούδης, Konstantinos Leichoudes; died 9 or 10 August 1063) was the Ecumenical Patriarch of Constantinople from 1059 until his death in 1063.

Born in Constantinople, he was a fellow student of Michael Psellus and John Xiphilinus. He rose to high court offices: appointed protovestiarios, he later became proedros ("president") of the Byzantine Senate and was one of the senior aides of emperors Michael V and Constantine IX. He also became abbot of the imperial Mangana Monastery, and in 1059, following the dismissal of Michael I of Constantinople, he was elected into the patriarchal office, which he held until his death. He is considered a saint of the Eastern Orthodox Church and is commemorated on 29 July.

== Notes and references ==
Eastern Orthodox Church titles
Preceded by Michael I	Ecumenical Patriarch of Constantinople; 1059 – 1063	Succeeded by John VIII
