= Synaxarion of Constantinople =

Greek collection of saint commemorations

Hippolyte Delehaye's 1902 edition of the Synaxarion. Click to open.

The Synaxarion of Constantinople (or Synaxarion of the Great Church) (Note: Greek: Synaxarion periechon holou tou eniautou tōn hagiōn kai tōn hosiōn en syntomō ta hypomnēmata, "Synaxarion containing abstracts of deeds of the blessed saints and martyrs for the whole year"; Latin: Synaxarium Ecclesiae Constantinopolitanae, "Synaxarion of the church of Constantinople".) is a Greek collection of brief notices of saints commemorated in the churches of Constantinople arranged by feast. Each notice contains a short biography and the date and location of the commemoration (synaxis). It also contains descriptions of liturgical processions in the city. It was commissioned by the Emperor Constantine VII during his sole reign (944–959) and compiled by the deacon and librarian Evaristos. (Note: Evaristos (Euaristus) is known only from the Arabic version, where his name (h.w.r.s.t.s) is given in the prologue. The prologue is anonymous in the Greek version.) It is an important source for the urban topography of Constantinople.

The notices are hagiographical in character and rarely run more than a paragraph in length. They are generally abstracts of longer saint's lives. There is an emphasis on martyrdom. The latest saint included is Patriarch Antony II of Constantinople, who died in 901. Some recensions of the Synaxarion from the 12th century and later included verses from the hagiographical poems of Christopher of Mytilene. There are over 300 manuscript copies of the Synaxarion. An Arabic translation was produced in the 11th century for the Melkite community. It contains some additional Melkite saints. Joseph, a deacon of Constantinople, is said to have made an Armenian translation in 991–992, which formed the basis for an expanded Armenian synaxary composed around 1240. In the 13th and 14th centuries, Church Slavonic translations were produced.

The Synaxarion of Constantinople was often transmitted with liturgical rubrics to assist in the celebration of the daily office. In the monastic tradition, it was sometimes combined with the typikon. Readings from the Synaxarion are also incorporated into the menaia. The largest number of manuscripts, however, do not contain any such rubrics and represent the "pure" Synaxarion.

== Bibliography ==
- Anderson, Benjamin (2018). "Synaxarium Ecclesiae Constantinopolitanae". In Nicholson, Oliver (ed.). The Oxford Dictionary of Late Antiquity, Volume 2: J–Z. Oxford: Oxford University Press. p. 1438. ISBN 978-0-19-881625-6.
- Flusin, Bernard (2011). "Synaxarion of the Great Church". In David Thomas; Alex Mallett; Juan Pedro Monferrer Sala; Johannes Pahlitzsch; Mark Swanson; Herman Teule; John Tolan (eds.). Christian-Muslim Relations: A Bibliographical History. Vol. 3 (1050–1200). Leiden: Brill. pp. 574–585.
- Luzzi, Andrea (2014). "Synaxaria and the Synaxarion of Constantinople". In Stephanos Efthymiadis (ed.). The Ashgate Research Companion to Byzantine Hagiography, Volume II: Genres and Contexts. Ashgate. pp. 197–208.
- Taft, Robert F.; Ševčenko, Nancy Patterson (1991). "Synaxarion". In Kazhdan, Alexander (ed.). The Oxford Dictionary of Byzantium. Oxford and New York: Oxford University Press. ISBN 0-19-504652-8.
