= Siege of Belgrade (1071) =

- Part of the Byzantine–Hungarian War (1071–1072)
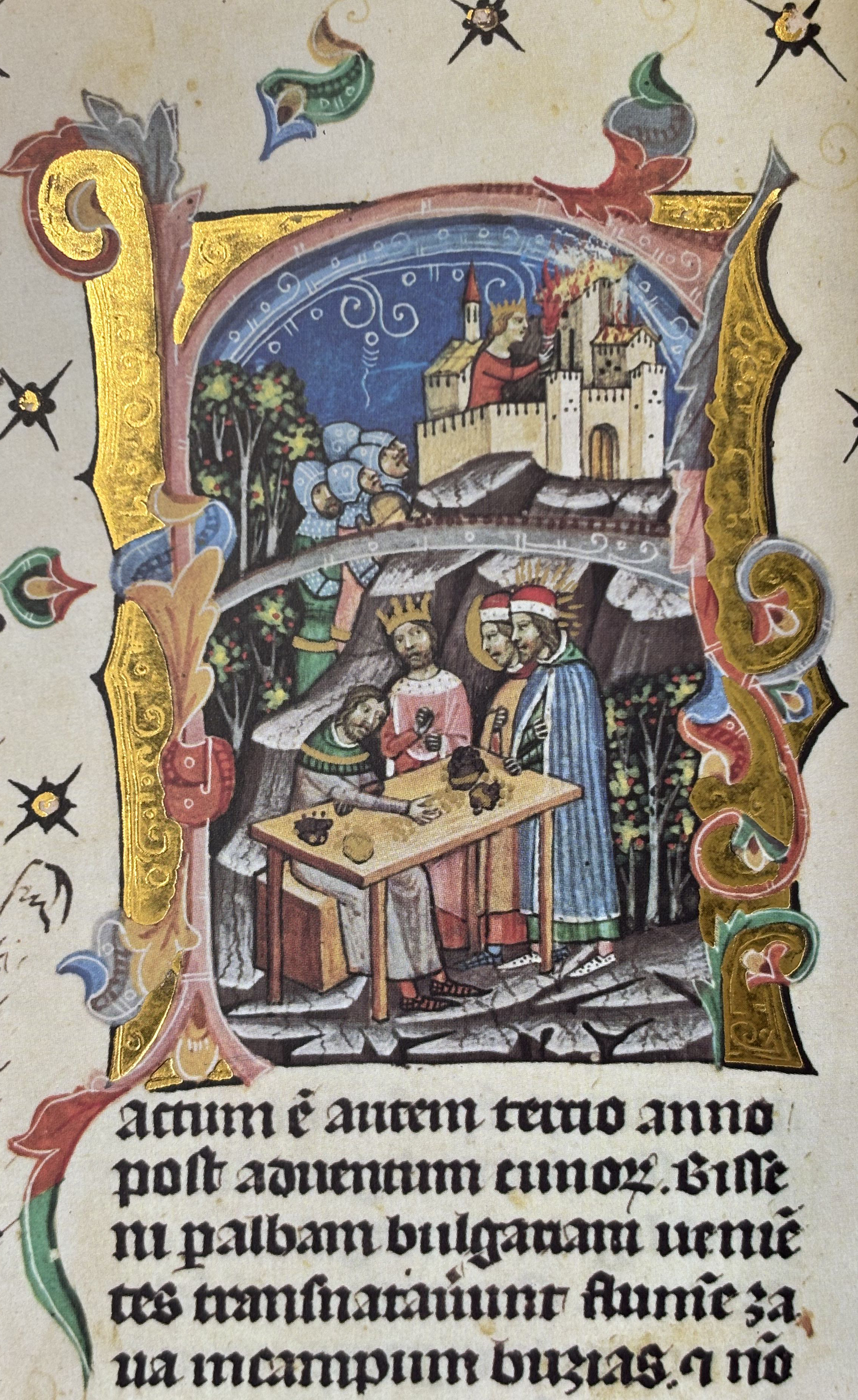
- The siege of Belgrade depicted by the 14th-century Illuminated Chronicle
Date	1071 (three months)
Location	Belgrade Fortress, Sirmium, Byzantine Empire
Result	Hungarian victory
Territorial changes	Hungary seizes Belgrade

Belligerents
Kingdom of Hungary	Byzantine Empire; Pechenegs

Commanders and leaders
King Solomon; Duke Géza; Duke Ladislaus; Vid Gutkeled; Jan	Duke Niketas (POW); Kazar

Units involved
Units from Bács and Sopron counties Forces of the "Duchy"	Bulgarians, Saracens

The siege of Belgrade, or siege of Nándorfehérvár (Hungarian: Nándorfehérvár ostroma) took place in the summer of 1071, when the Kingdom of Hungary launched a large-scale campaign against the Byzantine Empire taking advantage of the latter's difficult military situation in the southern and eastern border regions against the Normans and Seljuks, respectively. The siege lasted for almost three months according to the 14th-century Illuminated Chronicle. Finally, the Hungarians seized the fortress for the first time of their history. The city would become a battleground between the Byzantine Empire and the Kingdom of Hungary for more than a century.

== Background ==
The Belgrade Fortress laid on the foundations of the ancient Roman city Singidunum. It is located at the confluence of the Danube and the Sava, on top of a 125-meter-high promontory. The city lies south of what was then inhabited mostly by Greeks and Bulgarians.

Following the Byzantine conquest of Bulgaria, the Byzantines conquered the area reoccupying the border fortresses of the former Roman limes in the early 11th century. Belgrade, or Alba Bulgarica, became an important stronghold of the themes Bulgaria then Sirmium which bordered with the emerging Kingdom of Hungary along the lower course of the river Danube. Both Sirmium and Belgrade (along with Taurunum, present-day Zemun) were the only possible crossing points into Sirmium. The Bulgarian uprising of Petar Delyan broke out in Belgrade in 1040. After the rebellion was crushed, Byzantine rule was restored. The future emperor Romanos IV Diogenes served as commander of the cities on the Danubian frontier (i.e. Belgrade, Sirmium and Braničevo) prior to 1067.

When Pecheneg troops pillaged the Hungarian part of region Sirmium or Syrmia (now in Serbia) in the spring of 1071, the Hungarian monarch Solomon and his cousin duke Géza suspected that the soldiers of the Byzantine garrison at Belgrade – commanded by a certain dux (or strategos) Niketas – incited the marauders against Hungary, they decided to attack the fortress. The Hungarian army, consisted of royal and ducal units, crossed the river Sava, although the Byzantines "blew sulphurous fires by means of machines" against their boats. The Hungarians soon surrounded the city of Belgrade and laid siege to the fortress.

== The siege ==
=== Pechenegs' attack ===
On a Monday the king and the duke crossed the Sava; early in the morning they marshaled their forces, and by having all their troops join their shields, completely invested the city. Fearing that the siege placed them in peril, the Greeks and the Bulgarians secretly sent messengers to the Pechenegs and asked them to come without fear to their help.

— Illuminated Chronicle

By encircling the city, the Hungarians completely cut off Belgrade from the surrounding supply lines. Cavalry units formed the siege line beside the dense infantry troops. Due to the dire situation, Niketas sent a secret message to the Pechenegs who were performing border duties, asking them to provide assistance in relieving the castle. Hungarian historian Attila Kovács argued that these Pechenegs were not the same as those who had raided southern Hungary a few months earlier, sparking the war. Historian János B. Szabó considered these Pechenegs were probably subordinated under the provincial commander based in Naissos (Niš), who lived only 9–10 days' march from Belgrade, so they could be easily mobilized if necessary. Niketas asked for their help with the deliberate distortion that the city was not being besieged by the royal and ducal armies, but merely by the much smaller troops of Vid Gutkeled, who was Solomon's most influential advisor and also served as ispán of Bács County, i.e. he administered the region of Syrmia belonging to the Kingdom of Hungary. When the Pechenegs raided Syrmia in the spring of 1071, they had plundered Vid's estate in Buziás too. Therefore, the Byzantines presented the Hungarian attack to their allies – who were aware of the local topographical conditions – as a border conflict led by a local Hungarian lord, rather than a large-scale royal campaign.

Niketas' trick worked, and the Pecheneg troops defending the border, who hoped for rich spoils, under the command of their chieftain, Kazar, attacked the besieging army. They clashed with the detachment from Sopron County commanded by their ispán Jan, who "gallantly and courageously withstood the assault of the Pechenegs, many of whom fell there beneath the edge of the sword". Since a single county column was sufficient to defeat the attackers, it can be assumed that the Pechenegs could only number a few hundred. The Hungarians took many prisoners, but only a few of the Pechenegs, including Kazar, were able to flee. As a deterrent to the castle's defenders, Solomon and his cousins – dukes Géza and Ladislaus – spent a whole day presenting and inspecting the display of loot, prisoners, and the severed heads of slain warriors on a cliff near the city. The victorious Jan and his men were richly rewarded for their efficiency and bravery.

=== Three-month siege ===
As they watched their struggle, the king and the duke said to the warriors standing by: "Were it that the blood and heart of the Macchabaeans fired these warriors defending the Hungarians against the Saracens boldly fighting in defense of their citadel, the Hungarians might seize the Saracen's corpse".

— Illuminated Chronicle

Following the defeat of the Pecheneg relief army, the Hungarians began to organize the capture of the fortress. After scouting out suitable positions from which the city could best be besieged, Solomon and Géza ordered their carpenters to construct there eight wooden towers "twice the height of the walls, from which the warriors could strike with stones and arrows at the men in the center of the city". An equal number of catapults were set up between the towers to breach the walls, and long, movable partitions were also erected to protect the entrances to the towers and other fighting equipment. In addition, the Hungarians demolished the walls to the foundations, but they could not take the city itself because it was defended from the inside by "very brave warriors", as the Illuminated Chronicle says.

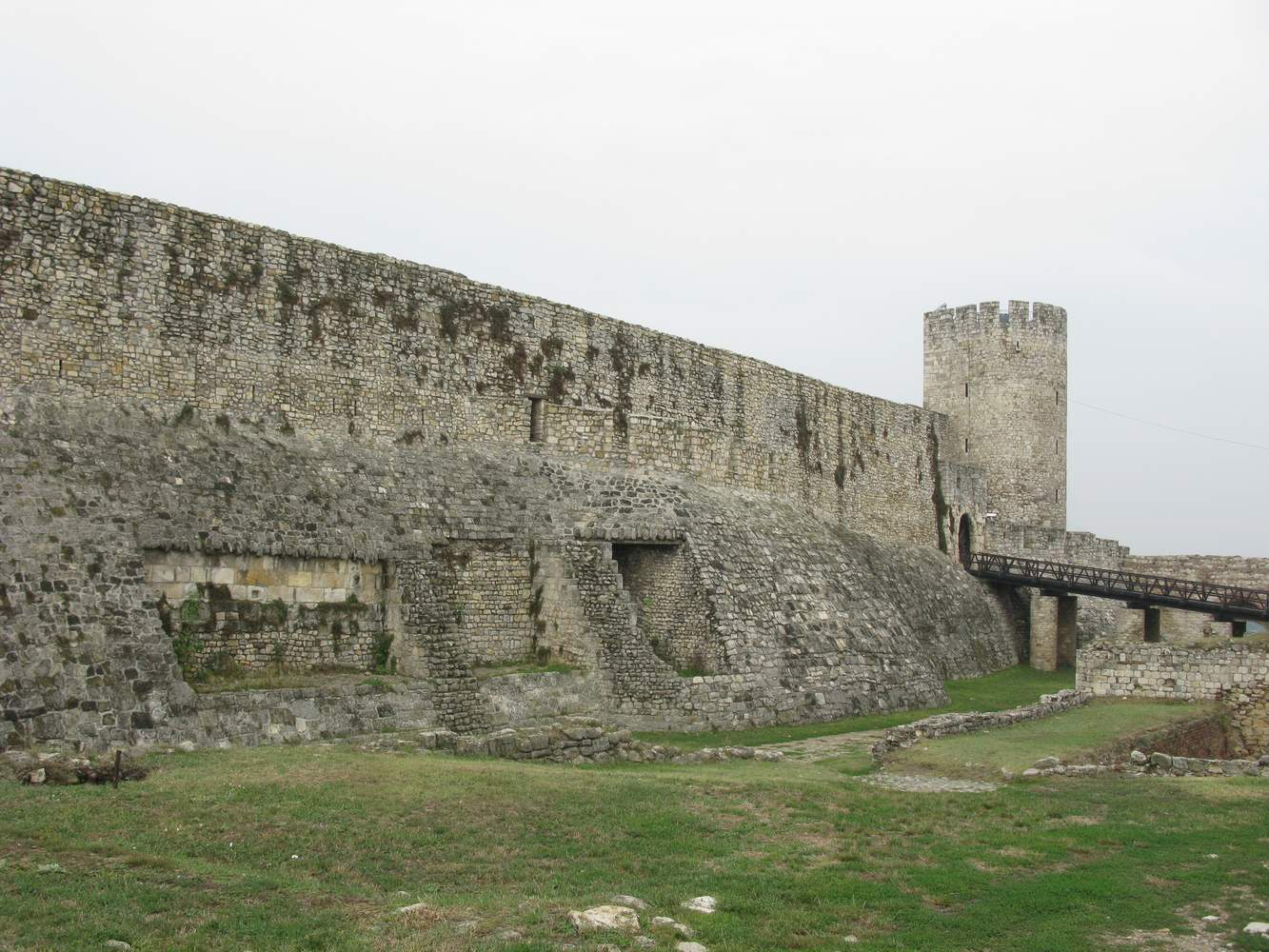
Remains of the Roman castrum in the older layers of the modern Belgrade Fortress

Despite these siege engineering preparations, the capture of the city and fortress was significantly delayed. This indicates that although the Hungarians were familiar with the siege methods of European warfare of the era, they had little opportunity to apply them due to their fighting style based on light cavalry and rapid attacks. Niketas constantly sent out units of "Saracen" (i.e. Muslim) warriors to attack the positions of the besieging Hungarians. Clashes between the Hungarians and the Saracens regularly took place along the walls. During all this, the Hungarian chronicle also immortalized individual merits. When three "very brave and daring Saracens" broke out of the castle and caused serious losses to the Hungarians with their spears, lances and arrows, a ballista-handler of the Hungarian royal army, Solomon by name, hit and killed one of them with his throwing machine. When the Hungarians strove to carry off his corpse, the two remaining Saracens fought fiercely for its protection. This micro-scene and the corpse symbolized the final outcome of the siege, so obtaining the corpse became of paramount importance for the Hungarian king. Hearing Solomon and Géza's wish and words, three brave Hungarian warriors, Opos, George and Bors "rushed forth and leapt upon the Saracens like a thunderbolt. Most valiantly Opos pursued them to the very gates of the city. The defenders hurled stones and arrows from the city battlements, but Opos returned unhurt. Meanwhile George and Bors urged on the Hungarians, who bore off the body of the Saracen and disgraced it". However, these were partial successes, the Hungarians were unable to breach the walls for two months, so not only the fortress, but also the city remained untouched. Niketas and his garrison resisted heroically despite the starvation tactics.

The breakthrough came in the third month for the Hungarians in the form of unexpected help. The Illuminated Chronicle narrates that "a Hungarian girl who had long before been brought there into captivity set fire to the city". The codex also depicts the scene in its initial. Since a fierce easterly wind blew, the fire spread to all the buildings. Thus the Hungarian army rushed into the part of the city where the siege engines had already demolished the bastions, and mercilessly massacred the Greeks, Saracens and Bulgarians. Niketas and his remaining garrison retreated to the citadel where they barricaded themselves. On the following day, the devastating fire has subsided and the Hungarians occupied the whole city encircling the citadel. The Hungarians began to plunder the city; they broke into the Greeks' cellars and chambers, searching for and acquiring a great deal of gold, silver, precious stones, precious pearls and other priceless treasures as part of the spoils of war. As the Illuminated Chronicle notes "there was none among the Hungarians who was not made rich".

== Surrender and aftermath ==
But the Duke Niketas, bearing a silver icon of the most Holy Mother of God, the Virgin Mary, and accompanied by a great multitude of people, gave himself up into the power of Duke Géza. For he knew that Duke Géza was devoted to God and that in him the bowels of compassion were moved towards those in captivity or affliction. But there came only few to give themselves into the hands of King Solomon, for they knew that he was a tough man and that in all things he listened to the vile counsels of ispán Vid, who was detestable in the eyes both of God and men. When the king saw that many sought refuge with the duke, but few with him, he resented that very much.

— Illuminated Chronicle

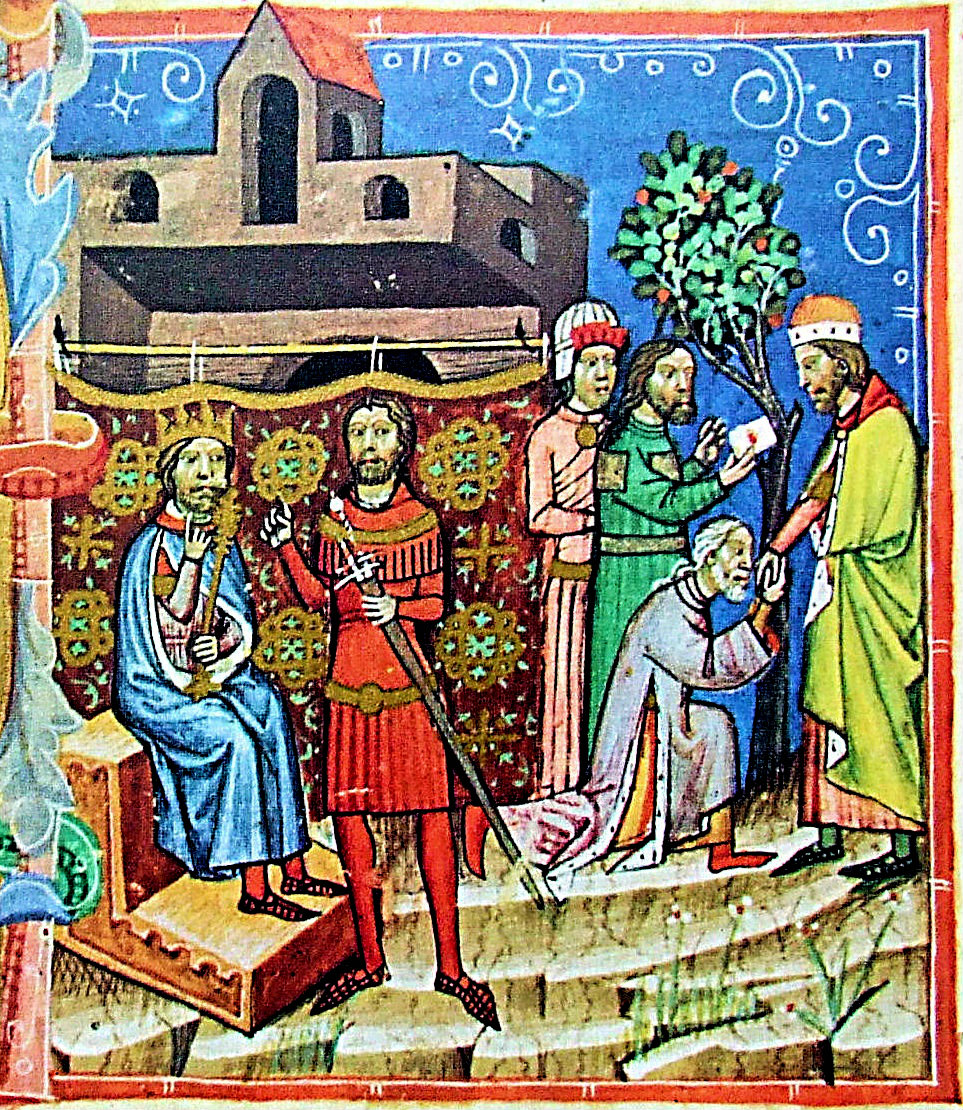
Géza receives the Byzantine ambassadors (right), while Count Vid incites Solomon against the duke (left), as depicted by the Illuminated Chronicle

The Byzantine garrison sent a message to Solomon, Géza and Ladislaus that they were willing to give up the citadel in exchange for sparing their lives. In response, the Hungarian monarch and the dukes guaranteed that in exchange for surrender the defenders would not be harmed. However, when most of the garrison, along with Niketas, surrendered to Géza, instead of the king, caused confusion and conflict among the Hungarians, in addition to the fact that in the sharing of the spoils that a quarrel arose between the king and the duke, which took place in Buziás, the estate of Vid. There, Solomon – on the counsel of Vid and his allies – granted only a quarter of the booty to Géza, who claimed its third part. Géza was greatly annoyed by this act. Thereafter the duke negotiated with the Byzantine envoys and set all the Byzantine captives – including Niketas – free without the king's consent. Géza entered into negotiations with the representatives of the Byzantine emperor – either Romanos IV Diogenes or Michael VII Doukas – excluding the king, behind his back, in order to conclude a peace treaty between them, which was achieved. Faced with this situation, Solomon was forced to acknowledge that the duke and the emperor had concluded an agreement through their envoys, bypassing his authority.

Despite the intrigues and opposites, the Hungarian campaign into the Balkans continued in the next year. Although Géza accompanied the king on the new campaign, his brother Ladislaus stayed behind with half of the troops of their duchy. The Annales Posonienses claims that the Byzantines recaptured the fort of Belgrade through a stratagem in 1072. If this is reliable data, the success was short-lived, as the Hungarians retook the fortress during a campaign that year that reached as far as Naissos. The emerging civil war between Solomon and Géza made it impossible to continue the campaign against Byzantium and the Hungarians were thus unable to exploit the opportunities and advantages arising from the conquest. It is possible that the uprising of Georgi Voyteh, which attempted to restore the Bulgarian Empire, broke out following or in connection with the results of the Hungarian campaign.

As a conclusion of the civil war, Géza I deprived Solomon from his throne in 1074. The new monarch concluded an alliance with the Byzantine Empire against his rival and his ally, the Holy Roman Empire. Géza asked the Byzantine Emperor Michael VII Doukas for a crown and married a niece of Nikephoros Botaneiates, a close advisor of the emperor. Géza returned the occupied forts along the Danube – Belgrade and Sirmium – to the Byzantine Empire in exchange for peace and alliance. The fortress of Belgrade would become a battleground between the Byzantine Empire and the Kingdom of Hungary for more than a century.

== Literary tradition ==
The text of the chronicle, which describes the events of the siege in relatively detail, follows that historiographical tradition which emerged in the Duchy of Normandy at the turn of the 11th and 12th centuries. Its style is similar to the Gesta Tancredi. The text presents all literary elements of contemporary warfare (combats, war machines, surrender, submission and distribution of spoils of war). Consequently, this passage of chronicle was written in the late 11th century or early 12th century.

Since the siege of Belgrade is presented in the context of dynastic conflicts and struggles for the Hungarian throne, which characterized the second half of the 11th-century Hungarian history during the era of Árpád dynasty, the text gives a prominent role to the personal characteristics of the characters. The monarch Solomon's royal authority and military effectiveness (though the latter is one of the most important virtues of a medieval ruler) are questioned as, in accordance with the chronicle's narration, the Byzantine garrison surrendered not to him, but to his cousin, Duke Géza. On the other hand, the text emphasizes that Géza was severely humiliated when he did not receive his share of the war booty. The text contains topological elements of the medieval narrative chanson de geste and the purpose of the text is to belittle Solomon's merits and highlight his negative qualities, while it emphasizes the virtues and legitimacy of Géza's lineage, thus, the authenticity of the circumstances surrounding the surrender of the castle's defenders is disputed.

== Sources ==
=== Primary sources ===
- Bak, János M.; Veszprémy, László; Kersken, Norbert (2018). Chronica de gestis Hungarorum e codice picto saec. XIV [The Illuminated Chronicle: Chronicle of the deeds of the Hungarians from the fourteenth-century illuminated codex]. Budapest: Central European University Press. ISBN 978-9-6338-6264-3.

=== Secondary sources ===
- B. Szabó, János (2013). Háborúban Bizánccal. Magyarország és a Balkán a 11–12. században [War with the Byzantium. Hungary and the Balkans in the 11–12th Century] (in Hungarian). Corvina. ISBN 978-963-13-6150-6.
- Bagi, Dániel (2025). "Between Reality and Fiction: The Siege of Belgrade in 1071 in the 14th Century Chronicle Composition". In Rastović, Aleksandar (ed.). The Eternal Cycle: Neighbours, Allies and/or Rivals – Serbo/Hungarian Relations in the Middle Ages (895–1541). Belgrade–Budapest: Istoriјski institut Beograd, Institute of History – Research Center for the Humanities. pp. 7–15. ISBN 9788677431587.
- Kovács, Attila (2017). "1071: besenyők, magyarok, bizánciak [1071: Pechenegs, Hungarians, Byzantines]". Acta Universitatis Szegediensis. Acta Historica (in Hungarian). 139. MTA-SZTE-MOL Magyar Medievisztikai Kutatócsoport: 45–53. ISSN 0324-6965.
- Makk, Ferenc (1987). "Megjegyzések Salamon és I. Géza történetéhez [Remarks to the History of Solomon and Géza I]". Acta Universitatis Szegediensis. Acta Historica (in Hungarian). 84. MTA-SZTE-MOL Magyar Medievisztikai Kutatócsoport: 31–44. ISSN 0324-6965.
- Pauler, Gyula (1899). A magyar nemzet története az Árpád-házi királyok alatt, I. [The History of the Hungarian Nation during the Árpádian Kings, Vol. 1.] (in Hungarian). Athenaeum.
