= Dimitris Krallis =

Greek historian

- Born: Athens, Greece

Academic background
- Education: University of Athens, University of Oxford, University of Michigan

Academic work
- Discipline: History
- Institutions: Simon Fraser University
- Main interests: Byzantine Studies

Dimitris Krallis (Greek: Δημήτρης Κράλλης) is a Greek historian who is Professor of Humanities and Director of the SNF Centre for Hellenic Studies at Simon Fraser University.

== Biography ==
Dimitris Krallis was born in Athens, Greece where he attended Athens College and the University of Athens. At the University of Athens he studied political theory and inspired by his professors of history, decided to apply for a graduate degree in Byzantine Studies. He attended the University of Oxford where he studied Byzantine social and political history. After an interruption of four years dedicated to military service and to teaching at the American College of Greece in Athens, he moved to the US and the University of Michigan for his doctorate. After graduating from the University of Michigan, he joined the faculty at Simon Fraser University where he is Professor of Humanities and Director at the Stavros Niarchos Foundation Centre for Hellenic Studies.

== Books and Book-length translations ==
- Serving Byzantium's Emperors: The Courtly Life and Career of Michael Attaleiates, New Approaches to Byzantine History and Culture Series, New York, NY: Palgrave MacMillan, 2019.
- Michael Attaleiates and the Politics of Imperial Decline in Eleventh Century Byzantium (Tempe, AZ: Arizona Center of Medieval and Renaissance Studies, 2012).
- (with Anthony Kaldellis) Michael Attaleiates: History (Washington, DC: Dumbarton Oaks Medieval Library – Harvard University Press, 2012) – a translation.

== Journal Articles and Book Chapters ==
- "Time, Space, and Physical Reality: Byzantine Authors and the Materiality of the Roman Imagined Community," V. N. Vlyssidou ed., Byzantine Authors and their Times (Athens: NHRF, 2021), 179-198
- “The Social Views of Michael Attaleiates,” in James Howard-Johnston ed., Social Change in Town and Country in Eleventh-Century Byzantium (Oxford: Oxford University Press, 2020), 44-61
- “Liquid Memories: Oceanic Allusions and Greek Imagery in the Forum of Constantine” in S. Günther, Li Qiang, C. Sode, S. Wahlgren, and Zhang Qiang eds., Byzantium in China: Studies in Honour of Professor Xu Jialing on the Occasion of her Seventieth Birthday - Supplements to the Journal of Ancient Civilizations (2019), 31–47.
- “Popular Political Agency in Byzantium’s Village and Towns” Byzantina Symmeikta 28 (2018), 11–38.
- “Historiography as Critical Contemporary Commentary” in A. Kaldellis and N. Siniossoglou ed., Cambridge Intellectual History of Byzantium (Cambridge, 2017), 599–614.
- “Historians, Politics, and the Polis in the Eleventh and twelfth Centuries” in B. Flusin and J.-C. Cheynet eds., Autour du Premier humanisme byzantin & des Cinq études sur le XIe siècle, quarante ans après Paul lemerle [Travaux et Mémoires 21.2] (Paris: Collège de France – CNRS, 2017), 419–48.
- “Imagining Rome in Medieval Constantinople: Memory, Politics, and the Past in the Middle Byzantine Period, ” B. Weiler and P. Lambert eds., How the Past was Used: Historical Cultures c. 750-2000 (Oxford: The British Academy, 2017), 49–68.
- “Urbane Warriors: Smoothing out tensions between soldiers and civilians in Attaleiates’ encomium to Emperor Nikephoros III Botaneiates,” in M. D. Lauxtermann and M. Whittow eds., Byzantium in the Eleventh Century: Being in Between (London, 2017), 154-168.
- “Greek Glory, Constantinian Legend: Praxagoras’ Athenian Agenda in Zosimos’ New History,” Journal of Late Antiquity 7.1 (Spring 2014), 110-130.
- “The outsider’s gaze: Reflections on Recent Non-byzantinist Readings of Byzantine History and on their implications for our field,” Byzantina Symmeikta 23 (2013), 183–99.
- “The ‘Critic’s’ Byzantine Ploy: Voltairian Confusion in Post-secularist narratives” Boundary 2 vol. 40, no. 1 (Spring 2013), 223–43.
- “Harmless satire, stinging critique: a new reading of the Timarion,” in Angelov D. and Saxby M. ed., Power and Subversion in Byzantium (Ashgate/Variorum, 2013), 221–45.
- with Thomas Kuehn, “Notes from the Guest Editors,” in Krallis D. and Kuehn T., ed. Journal of Modern Hellenism - Hellenism and Islam: Global and Historical Perspectives (Winter 2010–2011), ix- xvi.
- “‘Democratic’ Action in Eleventh-Century Byzantium: Michael Attaleiates’ ‘Republicanism’ in Context,” Viator 40 No. 2 (Fall 2009), 35-53
- “Sacred Emperor, Holy Patriarch: A New Reading of the Clash between Emperor Isaakios I Komnenos and Patriarch Michael Keroularios in Attaleiates’ History,” Byzantinoslavica 67 (2009): 169-90.
- “Michael Attaleiates as a Reader of Psellos” in Barber Ch. ed., Reading Michael Psellos (Leiden, 2006), 167–91.
- “The army that crossed two frontiers and established a third: the uses of the frontier by an eleventh-century Byzantine author” in Frontières au moyen âge - Frontiers in the Middle Ages of the F.I.D.E.M. series Textes et études du moyen âge (2006), 335–48.

== Videos ==
- Dr. Dimitris Krallis interview with ERT (Dec. 6, 2019) (in Greek)
- Army commanders as managers of demotic power in Byzantium, SNF Centre for Hellenic Studies at SFU
- In Conversation: Professor Dimitris Krallis on the Continuity of Greek Thought

== Sources ==
- Dimitris Krallis - SNF Centre for Hellenic Studies - Simon Fraser University
- 30. Byzantium in modern Greek life (Listener Questions I), with Dimitris Krallis
- 10. A Byzantine man of affairs, with Dimitris Krallis
- Dimitris Krallis | Simon Fraser University - Academia.edu
