= Byzantine–Hungarian War (1071–1072) =

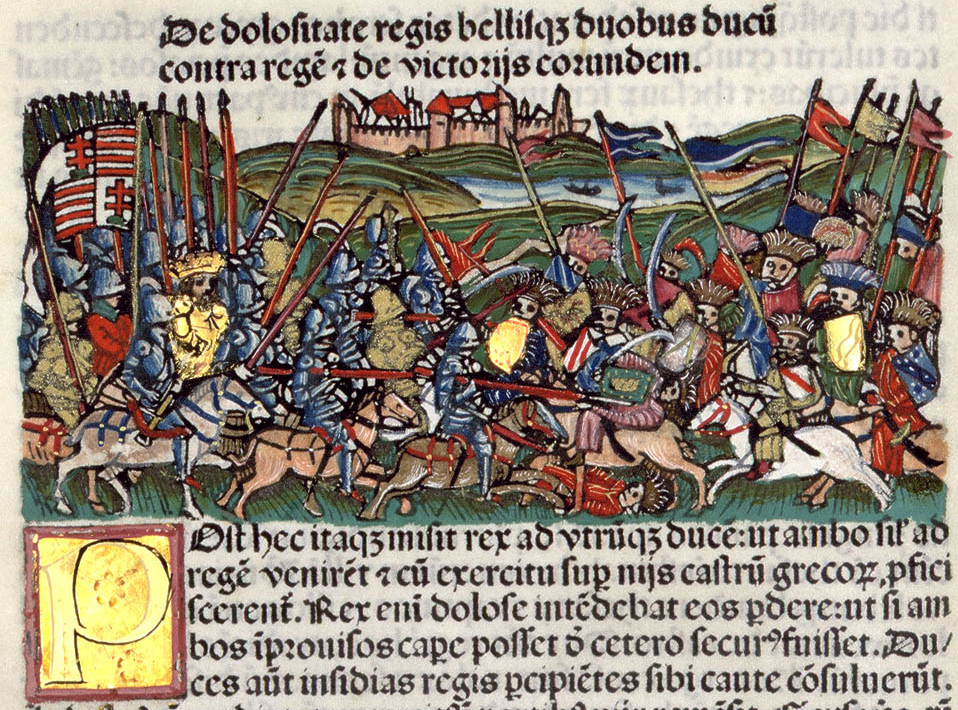
- 15th-century depiction of the war in Johannes de Thurocz's Chronica Hungarorum
Date	1071–1072
Location	Byzantine–Hungarian border along the Lower Danube and Sava, Byzantine themes Sirmium and Bulgaria
Result	Hungarian victory
Territorial changes	Hungary seizes Belgrade and Syrmia

Belligerents
Kingdom of Hungary	Byzantine Empire; Pechenegs

Commanders and leaders
King Solomon; Duke Géza; Duke Ladislaus (1071 only); Vid Gutkeled; Jan	Duke Niketas (POW); Kazar

Units involved
Units from Bács and Sopron counties; Hungarian river fleet; Forces of the "Duchy"	Bulgarians, Saracens; Danube river fleet

The Byzantine–Hungarian War (1071–1072) was the first of the series of wars between the Byzantine Empire and the Kingdom of Hungary. When Pechenegs crossed the Sava and stormed into Hungary, Solomon, King of Hungary and Duke Géza suspected that the soldiers of the Byzantine garrison at Belgrade incited the marauders against the kingdom. The Hungarians laid siege to Belgrade. In the next year, their army reached as far as Niš, taking advantage of the difficult political situation within the Byzantine Empire. Division of the war-booty caused a new conflict between Solomon and his cousins, Géza and Ladislaus, which made further war against the empire impossible.

== Sources ==
The first conflict between the Kingdom of Hungary and the Byzantine Empire is narrated almost exclusively by the 14th-century Illuminated Chronicle, which contains contemporary or near-contemporary historical records from the era. This work narrates the events from a Hungarian perspective, avoiding contextualization. The contemporary Byzantine chroniclers (for instance, Michael Psellos, Michael Attaleiates and John Skylitzes) do not refer to the border conflict. The Russian Primary Chronicle (PVL), also a compilation of various texts from the Kievan Rus', contains data that may place the circumstances of the conflict in a broader context.

== Background ==
At the course of the Byzantine conquest of Bulgaria, the Byzantines conquered the area reoccupying the border fortresses of the former Roman limes in the early 11th century, establishing themes Bulgaria then Sirmium which bordered with the emerging Kingdom of Hungary along the lower course of the river Danube. Despite that, the first Hungarian king Stephen I was a close ally of the Byzantine Emperor, Basil II. He even joined the Byzantines in the war ending with their conquest of Bulgaria in 1018. The Kingdom of Hungary was not threatened by hostile Byzantine intentions for a long time, and in fact, in the middle third of the 11th century, during the pagan revolts and the invasions of the Holy Roman Empire, the Byzantine Empire was considered more of a support than an opponent, even if small-scale skirmishes did arise from time to time on the joint border along the Danube extending from the river Morava to the Carpathian Mountains. Hungary, likewise, did not intervene in the uprising of Petar Delyan in 1040, which aimed to restore the Bulgarian Empire.

Due to the Pecheneg revolts, the continuous Norman conquest of southern Italy and the beginning of the Byzantine–Seljuk wars, the Byzantine Empire experienced difficult decades, which, among other people, increased the appetite of the Hungarians too. It was then that the kingdom recovered from the two decades of turmoil that characterized the post-Stephen period. It is possible that the Pechenegs and the Hungarians, under the reign of Andrew I, launched a joint plundering raid against the realm around 1059.

The Hungarian monarch Solomon ascended the Hungarian throne with the assistance of the Holy Roman Empire in 1063. Solomon and his cousins – Géza, Ladislaus and Lampert – eventually reached an agreement: Géza and his brothers acknowledged Solomon as lawful king, and Solomon granted them their father's one-time ducatus. The king and his cousins closely cooperated in the period between 1064 and 1071, when various jointly organized military campaigns took place. Solomon pursued an active foreign policy towards the Balkans. It is possible that he, to some extent, supported the rebellion of the future emperor Romanos IV Diogenes, who served as commander of the cities on the Danubian frontier (i.e. Belgrade, Sirmium and Braničevo) prior to 1067.

== The war ==
=== Pechenegs' raid ===
It happened in the third year after the coming of the Cumans that the Pechenegs advanced through Alba Bulgarica [Belgrade] and swam across the Sava river into the fields of Buziás and carried off no small number of captives and other booty into their own country. The king and the duke charged [those of] Belgrade with treachery because they had violated the peace by having freely permitted the robber bands of the Pechenegs to plunder Hungary.

— Illuminated Chronicle

A significant number of Pecheneg troops, who were settled in the border along the Danube in order to protect the borderland, crossed the river Sava at the Byzantine fort of Belgrade and pillaged the region Syrmia, located in southern Hungary, in the spring of 1071. They plundered the fields of Buziás in Syrmia, taking many prisoners and spoils of war. There, Vid Gutkeled, one of the most influential advisors of King Solomon, possessed extensive landholdings. Some historians identified the aforementioned landholding with Buziás (also called Fulbertfalva) in Valkó County or with Bežanija, present-day an urban neighborhood of Belgrade in Serbia, or a now uninhabited settlement located in present-day Ugrinovci in Zemun (also in Belgrade). Since a protracted war was not a common response to the everyday border conflicts typical of the era, it is possible that the Pechenegs penetrated deeper into the territory of the Kingdom of Hungary than before.

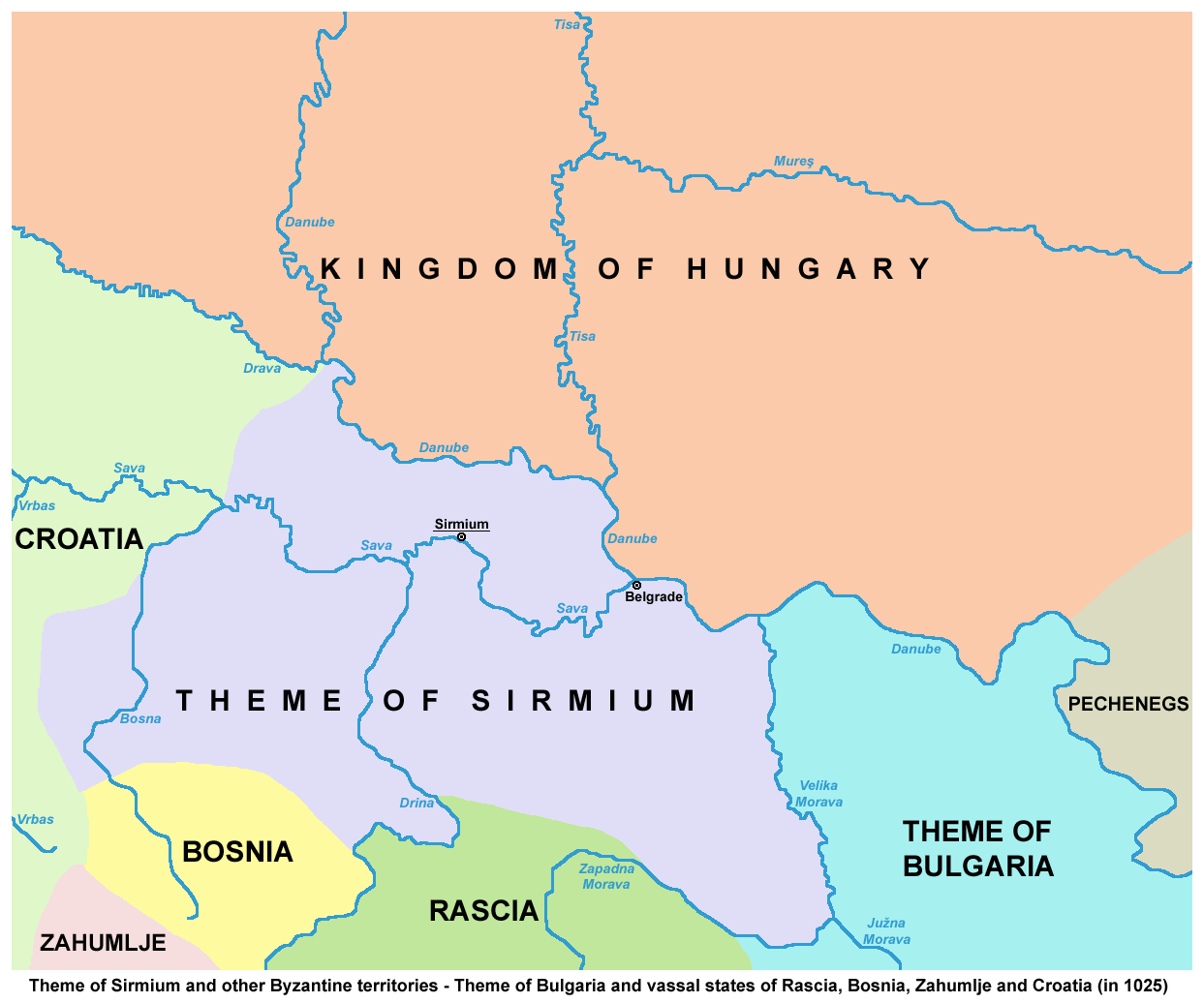
The theme of Sirmium and the Byzantine–Hungarian borderland in the mid-11th century

Hungarian historian János B. Szabó argued that there is no trace from this period of Pecheneg settlements directly near the Hungarian border, thus the raiders came either from the province of Paristrion east of Vidin, on the southern bank of the Danube, where at that time there was a very mixed population of Bulgarians, Vlachs, Pechenegs, and Ouzes, or from the area between Naissos (Niš) and Serdica (in Sofia) in the theme of Bulgaria, where groups of Pechenegs were settled after their failed revolt two decades earlier. According to Slovak historian Marek Meško, it is conceivable that the Pechenegs living north of the Danube, who had already invaded Hungary in 1068, were also responsible for the 1071 attack. Based on the data of the Russian Primary Chronicle, which narrates that Cumans crossed Dnieper and laid siege to the towns Rastovets and Neyatin in 1071, Hungarian historian Attila Kovács considered that Pechenegs (and Ouzes) fleeing the western expansion of the Cumans crossed Lower Danube and settled along the Byzantine border. In order to obtain the booty that ensured the existence of their political confederation, they pillaged southern Hungary, which their relatives, the Pechenegs who guarded the border, did not prevent.

The Hungarian king and his cousins suspected that the soldiers of the Byzantine garrison at Belgrade incited the marauders against Hungary. The Pechenegs were hired as mercenaries by the Byzantine Empire since 1048. Therefore, this attack provided the reason for Solomon and the dukes to launch a campaign against the Byzantine Empire. It is also possible that the military difficulties of the empire that occurred during the reign of Romanos IV Diogenes, mostly the Siege of Bari, which resulted the dissolution of the Catepanate of Italy, and the Battle of Manzikert, which resulted in the mobilization of significant forces from the north to the southern and eastern borders of the Byzantine Empire, provided an opportunity for Solomon to adopt an expansionist policy towards the south. The raids of Pechenegs into Hungary provided the pretext and legal basis for this. Kovács emphasized that it was not in the least interest of the Byzantines to anger the Hungarians and thus enable an attack on the empire at the worst possible time. In this context, the Hungarian invasion was a "backstabbing", which made the emperor's situation more difficult and can ultimately be considered one of the reasons for his downfall. The Hungarian royal court was obviously aware that the bulk of the Byzantine army had been in Asia Minor since early 1071 due to the imperial expedition against Alp Arslan. It is also conceivable that the Hungarians wanted to create a buffer zone to prevent or mitigate further Pecheneg incursions into their kingdom.

=== Hungarian counter-attack ===
[The Hungarians] collected their armies, and having met in council at Zalankemen they determined that the treacherous Belgrade must be besieged and occupied. Moving camp, they came down along the Sava in the direction of Belgrade. There went out a decree from the king and the duke that the whole Hungarian army should cross the Sava into Bulgaria the sooner the better. But from their boats the Greeks and the Bulgarians blew sulphurous fires by means of machines against the Hungarian ships, so that they burned even in the very water. However, the fire spitting Greeks were vanquished by the Hungarians, who had launched upon the river a great fleet. The Greeks and the Bulgarians took to flight, and the Hungarians crossed over and occupied the Bulgarian borders.

— Illuminated Chronicle

Shortly after the Pechenegs' raid, Solomon declared a war against the Byzantine Empire. The Hungarian army – based on the county military organization and the system of castle warriors – gathered at the Hungarian border near the fortified city of Zalánkemén (present-day Stari Slankamen, Serbia). Solomon and his cousin Géza jointly launched their campaign against the empire; they were considered experienced and well-acquainted military leaders through the campaigns of previous years (their joint campaign against the Carantanians or Venetians in Dalmatia in 1066, the retaliatory campaign into Bohemia in 1067 and the fight against the invading Cumans in 1068). Based on the narration of the Illuminated Chronicle, the entire Hungarian military organization was mobilized, including the forces of the duchy under the command of the king's cousins, Géza and Ladislaus.

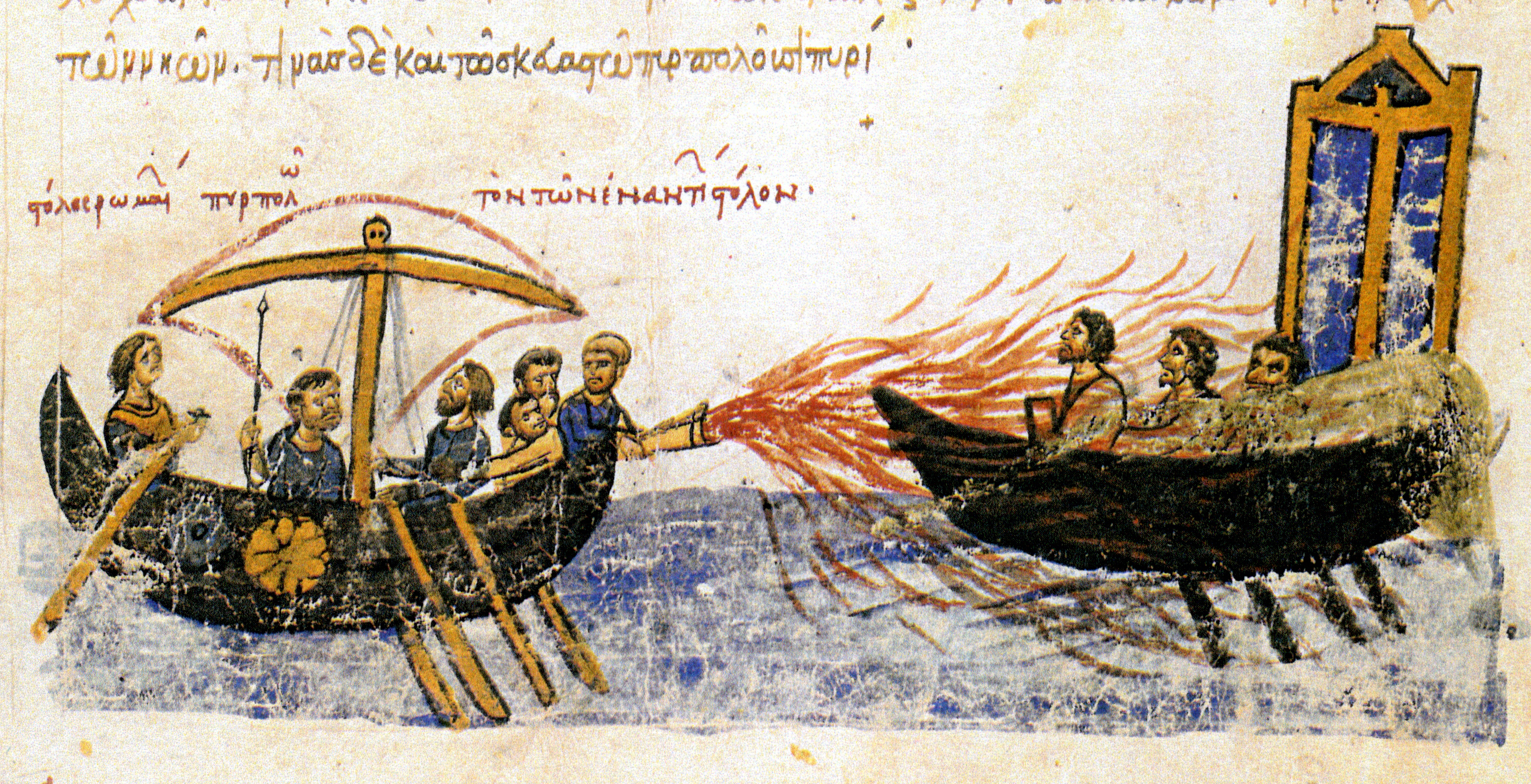
The usage of Greek fire, depicted by the 12th-century Madrid Skylitzes

The Hungarians' war goal is unclear: Bulgarian historian Vasil Zlatarski considered that Solomon intended to submit whole Syrmia, occupying its parts south of the Danube. Hungarian historian Henrik Marczali claimed that the Hungarians aimed to conquer the Balkan Peninsula. In contrast, Ferenc Makk argued that the objectives of gaining hegemony over the Balkans were first felt in Hungarian foreign policy under Béla II. Raimund Kerbl considered that the launch of the Hungarian campaign is connected with the fall of Romanos Diogenes who was deposed in October 1071 after his disastrous defeat and captivity at Manzikert. Accordingly, the Hungarians and Romanos were considered allies during that time and Solomon also sent auxiliary troops to assist the emperor against the Seljuks. Kerbl argued the Hungarian military campaign took place in late October 1071 as a retaliatory campaign against the "usurper" Michael VII Doukas. However, Kerbl incorrectly identified the "Sauromatians", who fought on the side of Romanos at Manzikert according to Michael Attaleiates, with the Hungarians; they were, in fact, Frankish, Norman, and German mercenaries. On the other hand, as Ferenc Makk emphasized, the date of the Hungarian campaign is uncertain: due to the winter conditions of medieval warfare, it is more likely that the attack was launched at the end of August at the latest, during the reign of Romanos Diogenes. Makk argued that the aim of the campaign, beyond retaliation and plunder, was limited territorial expansion along the southern border.

Following preparations, the Hungarian army began crossing Sava, which the Byzantine river fleet tried to prevent upon the order of dux Niketas, the military commander of Belgrade Fortress. The boats of the "Byzantines and Bulgarians", which formed the defensive line along the Danube, used the incendiary weapon of Greek fire to set several attacking ships on fire. However, the crossing Hungarian army was significantly outnumbered, so they successfully broke through the Byzantine river blockade, sinking the imperial ships. The Hungarians then landed on the south side of the river, occupying the border areas.

=== Siege of Belgrade ===
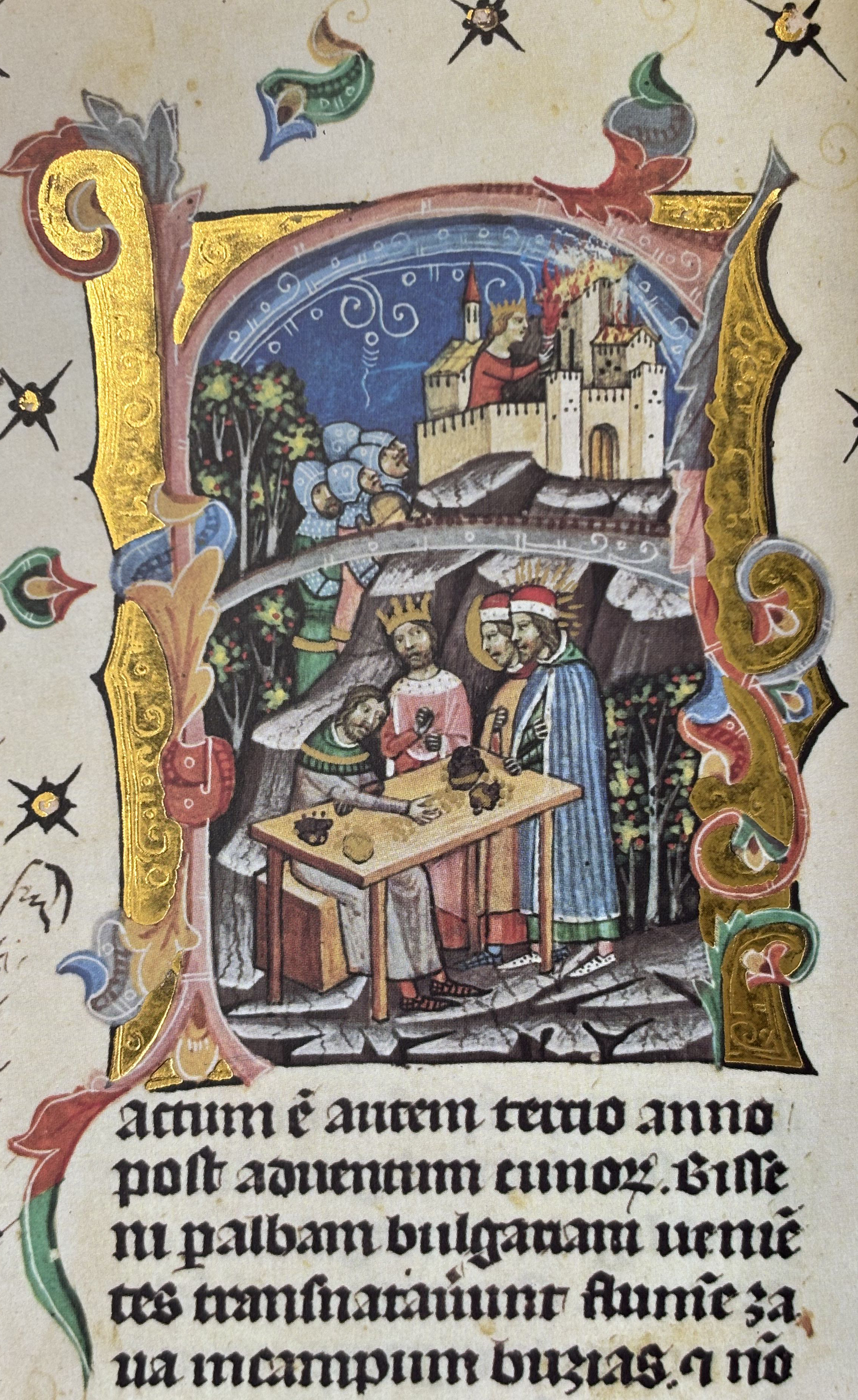
The siege of Belgrade depicted by the 14th-century Illuminated Chronicle

The Hungarians soon surrounded the city of Belgrade and laid siege to the fortress. Due to the dire situation, Niketas sent a secret message to the Pechenegs who were performing border duties, asking them to provide assistance in relieving the castle. Kovács argued that these Pechenegs were not the same as those who had raided southern Hungary a few months earlier, sparking the war. The Byzantine commander asked for their help with the deliberate distortion that the city was besieged by only a smaller unit of Vid Gutkeled, as part of an ordinary border conflict to take revenge for the earlier Pecheneg raid. The arriving Pecheneg relief army, led by their chieftain Kazar, was swept away by a single column, the detachment from Sopron County under the command of their ispán Jan. Most of the Pechenegs were slaughtered, only few of them – including Kazar – were able to flee. To deter the castle defenders, the prisoners of war and the bodies of the killed Pechenegs were put on public display.

Despite the fact that the Hungarians built siege works (towers, catapults) and partially demolished the castle wall, the defenders held out heroically for months. Niketas constantly sent out units of "Saracen" (i.e. Muslim) warriors to attack the positions of the besieging Hungarians. Clashes between the Hungarians and the Saracens regularly took place along the walls. The Hungarians were unable to breach the walls for two months, so not only the fortress, but also the city remained untouched. Niketas and his garrison resisted bravely despite the starvation tactics. The fateful day came in the third month, when "a Hungarian girl who had long before been brought there into captivity set fire to the city". Thanks to the raging fire, the Hungarians broke through the defensive wall and stormed the city, while the garrison fled to the citadel. The Hungarian troops massacred a significant part of the population and began looting, searching every cellar and hiding place for valuables. Since the empire's situation made it impossible to send help, surrender negotiations soon began between the Byzantine garrison and the Hungarian generals.

With the capture of Belgrade, the Hungarians conquered all the region Sirmium and also seized its namesake capital Sirmium (present-day Sremska Mitrovica in Serbia) under unclear circumstances. The Hungarian army also occupied the nearby fort Taurunum, present-day Zemun. The region was integrated into the Hungarian administration and the medieval Syrmia County (Hungarian: Szerém) was gradually developed from the original status of border ispánate (or march) following the 1071–1072 war. The region Syrmia became contested between the Byzantines and Hungarians over the century thereafter.

=== The collapse of Hungarian political unity ===
But the Duke Niketas, bearing a silver icon of the most Holy Mother of God, the Virgin Mary, and accompanied by a great multitude of people, gave himself up into the power of Duke Géza. For he knew that Duke Géza was devoted to God and that in him the bowels of compassion were moved towards those in captivity or affliction. But there came only few to give themselves into the hands of King Solomon, for they knew that he was a tough man and that in all things he listened to the vile counsels of ispán Vid, who was detestable in the eyes both of God and men. When the king saw that many sought refuge with the duke, but few with him, he resented that very much.

— Illuminated Chronicle

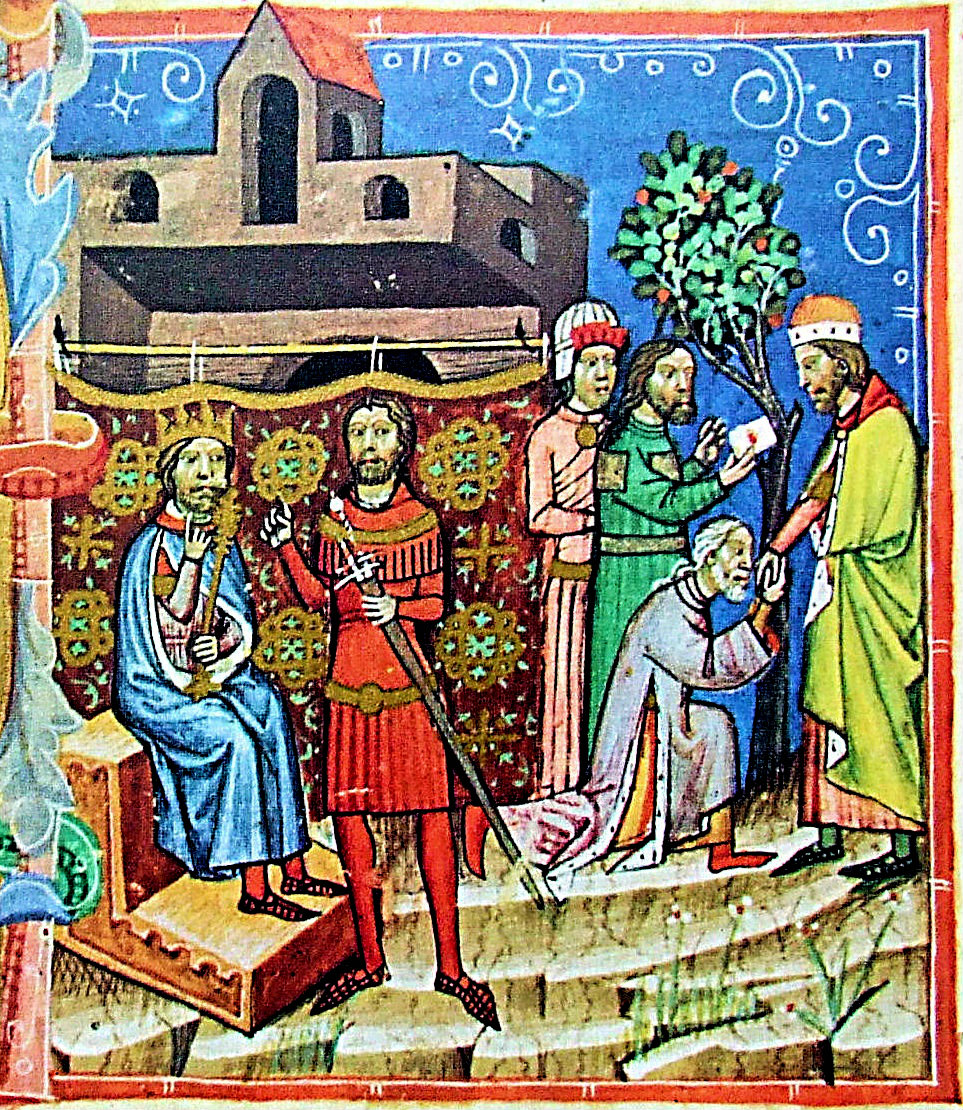
Géza receives the Byzantine ambassadors (right), while Count Vid incites Solomon against the duke (left), as depicted by the Illuminated Chronicle

The Byzantine garrison sent a message to Solomon, Géza and Ladislaus that they were willing to give up the citadel in exchange for sparing their lives. In response, the Hungarian monarch and the dukes guaranteed that in exchange for surrender the defenders would not be harmed. However, when most of the garrison, along with Niketas, surrendered to Géza, instead of the king, caused confusion and conflict among the Hungarians, in addition to the fact that in the sharing of the spoils that a quarrel arose between the king and the duke, which took place in Buziás, the estate of Vid. There, Solomon – on the counsel of Vid and his allies, Bishop Franco, Rodowan and his son-in-law Ilia, who all participated in the military campaign – granted only a quarter of the booty to Géza, who claimed its third part. Géza was greatly annoyed by this act. Thereafter the duke negotiated with the Byzantine envoys and set all the Byzantine captives – including Niketas – free without the king's consent. Géza entered into negotiations with the representatives of the Byzantine emperor – either Romanos IV Diogenes or Michael VII Doukas – excluding the king, behind his back, in order to conclude a peace treaty between them, which was achieved. Faced with this situation, Solomon was forced to acknowledge that the duke and the emperor had concluded an agreement through their envoys, bypassing his authority.

Although the Illuminated Chronicle clearly identified Count Vid as the instigator of the internal war – thus, several scholars, including Bálint Hóman saw the moral failings of Solomon and Vid behind the roots of the conflict –, but historian Ferenc Makk argued that Géza insulted the royal majesty with his act, when he agreed that the defenders would surrender before him and thereby he exceeded his authority. Regarding the Byzantines' surrender specifically before Géza, perhaps the main reason for this special attention was that, according to Raimund Kerbl, the duke had already married a prominent Byzantine lady from the Synadenos family in the mid-1060s, who was the niece of the distinguished leader and later emperor of the empire, Nikephoros III Botaneiates, and for this reason he may have had good relations with the empire long before. In contrast, most of the Hungarian historians put the date of their marriage in the mid-1070s, when Géza I already ascended the Hungarian throne.

=== The 1072 campaign ===
Meanwhile the men of Niš sent to the king and the duke rich gifts of gold and silver and precious cloaks. Then on their return from the city of Keve, the king and the duke separated.

— Illuminated Chronicle

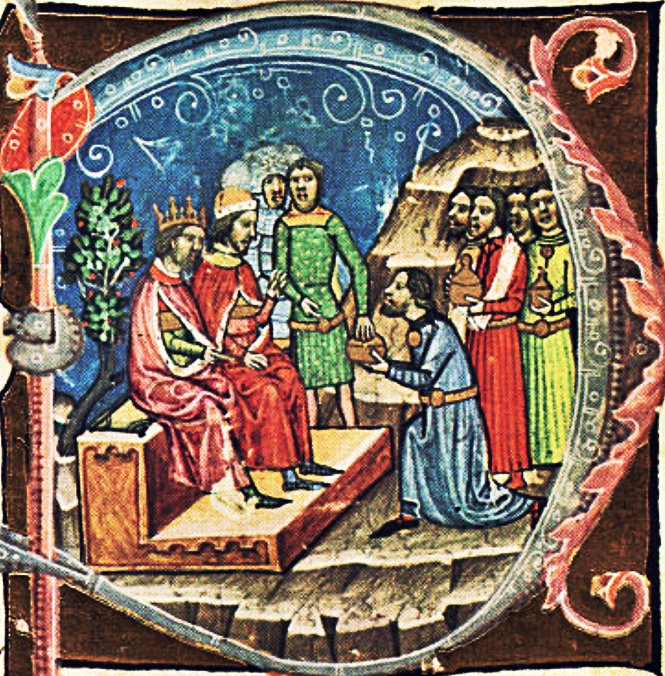
Solomon and Géza receive gifts from the burghers of Naissos (Niš), as depicted by the Illuminated Chronicle

As the Illuminated Chronicle narrates, Vid's "poisonous words filled the king with hate and rancor", but he practiced dissimulation for tactical reasons, and in pretended friendship he sent the duke away to his duchy. As a result, despite the intrigues and opposites, Solomon and Géza jointly participated in the continuation of the campaign against the Byzantine Empire in 1072, but Géza's brother, Ladislaus remained with half of their troops in the Nyírség to protect the area from possible royal attack. The Annales Posonienses claims that the Byzantines recaptured the fort of Belgrade through a stratagem in 1072. If this is reliable data, maybe this was the reason for the Hungarians' second campaign, which now clearly took place during the reign of Michael Doukas.

The Byzantines' success was short-lived, as the Hungarians retook the fortress within short time during a campaign that year that reached as far as Naissos. This punitive expedition took place in the first half of 1072, in October at the latest. The Hungarian light cavalry reached the birthplace of Constantine the Great in seven to eight days. Along their route, they sacked several towns and took many prisoners enslaving the settlements along the Danube. The citizens of Naissos did not engage in battle and tried to prevent the Hungarians from plundering the city with gifts. The Hungarians, cracking open the untouched coffin, also took the relics (right arm) of Saint Procopius of Scythopolis and presented to the Greek monastery dedicated to Saint Demetrius of Thessaloniki (Hungarian: Szávaszentdemeter) near Sirmium. As the 12th-century Byzantine historian John Kinnamos formulates that when the Hungarians reached Naissos they, "finding the martyr's holy coffin, they judged it inhumane, I think, to carry off the entire body, yet after they had cut off the arm they departed. Reaching Sirmion, they deposited it there in the church of the martyr Demetrius". After the plundering campaign ended, Géza and his troops separated from the royal army at the mouth of the Morava near the castle of Keve (today Kovin, Serbia), and returned to his duchy in order to prepare his resistance against Solomon.

== Aftermath ==
The emerging civil war between Solomon and Géza made it impossible to continue the campaign against Byzantium and the Hungarians were thus unable to exploit the opportunities and advantages arising from the conquest. It is possible that the uprising of Georgi Voyteh, which attempted to restore the Bulgarian Empire, broke out in Naissos following or in connection with the results of the Hungarian campaign, because Solomon's expedition weakened the Byzantine defenses in the Morava Valley, which later benefited the rebels. There is no data that Bulgarian claimant Constantine Bodin received Hungarian support for his cause.

As a conclusion of the civil war, Géza I deprived Solomon from his throne in 1074. The new monarch concluded an alliance with the Byzantine Empire against his rival and his ally, the Holy Roman Empire. Géza asked the Byzantine Emperor Michael VII Doukas for a crown and married a niece of Nikephoros Botaneiates, a close advisor of the emperor. Géza returned the occupied forts along the Danube – Belgrade and Sirmium – to the Byzantine Empire in exchange for peace and alliance. While Belgrade was indeed in Byzantine hands by the early 1090s, it is, however, possible that the Hungarians retained Sirmium until 1165. At the same time, the settlement of Hungarian–Byzantine relations also had the important consequence of guaranteeing peace and tranquility in a significant part of the empire's borders in the northern Balkans during a very difficult period (the Seljuk wars, the rebellions of mercenary leader Roussel de Bailleul and claimant John Doukas). The fortress of Belgrade and the whole region of Syrmia would become a battleground between the Byzantine Empire and the Kingdom of Hungary for more than a century.

== Sources ==
=== Primary sources ===
- Deeds of John and Manuel Comnenus by John Kinnamos (Translated by Charles M. Brand) (1976). Columbia University Press. ISBN 0-231-04080-6.
- Bak, János M.; Veszprémy, László; Kersken, Norbert (2018). Chronica de gestis Hungarorum e codice picto saec. XIV [The Illuminated Chronicle: Chronicle of the deeds of the Hungarians from the fourteenth-century illuminated codex]. Budapest: Central European University Press. ISBN 978-9-6338-6264-3.

=== Secondary sources ===
- B. Szabó, János (2013). Háborúban Bizánccal. Magyarország és a Balkán a 11–12. században [War with the Byzantium. Hungary and the Balkans in the 11–12th Century] (in Hungarian). Corvina. ISBN 978-963-13-6150-6.
- Curta, Florin (2006). Southeastern Europe in the Middle Ages, 500–1250. Cambridge University Press. ISBN 978-0-521-89452-4.
- Fine, John Van Antwerp Jr. (1991). The Early Medieval Balkans: A Critical Survey from the Sixth to the Late Twelfth Century. Michigan: The University of Michigan Press. ISBN 0-472-08149-7.
- Kovács, Attila (2017). "1071: besenyők, magyarok, bizánciak [1071: Pechenegs, Hungarians, Byzantines]". Acta Universitatis Szegediensis. Acta Historica (in Hungarian). 139. MTA-SZTE-MOL Magyar Medievisztikai Kutatócsoport: 45–53. ISSN 0324-6965.
- Makk, Ferenc (1987). "Megjegyzések Salamon és I. Géza történetéhez [Remarks to the History of Solomon and Géza I]". Acta Universitatis Szegediensis. Acta Historica (in Hungarian). 84. MTA-SZTE-MOL Magyar Medievisztikai Kutatócsoport: 31–44. ISSN 0324-6965.
- Makk, Ferenc; Thoroczkay, Gábor (2006). Írott források az 1050–1116 közötti magyar történelemről [Written Sources of the Hungarian History between 1050 and 1116] (in Hungarian). Szegedi Középkorász Műhely. ISBN 978-963-482-794-8.
- Pauler, Gyula (1899). A magyar nemzet története az Árpád-házi királyok alatt, I. [The History of the Hungarian Nation during the Árpádian Kings, Vol. 1.] (in Hungarian). Athenaeum.
- Stephenson, Paul (2000). Byzantium's Balkan Frontier: A Political Study of the Northern Balkans, 900–1204. Cambridge: Cambridge University Press. ISBN 978-0-521-77017-0.
- Treadgold, Warren (1997). A History of the Byzantine State and Society. Stanford University Press. ISBN 0-8047-2630-2.
