= Magnaura =

Building in Byzantine Constantinople

The Magnaura (Medieval Greek: Μαγναύρα, possibly from Latin: Magna Aula, "Great Hall") was a large building in Byzantine Constantinople located next to the Great Palace. It was situated to the east of the Augustaion, close to the Hagia Sophia, and next to the Chalke Gate and has often equated by scholars with the building that housed the Senate.

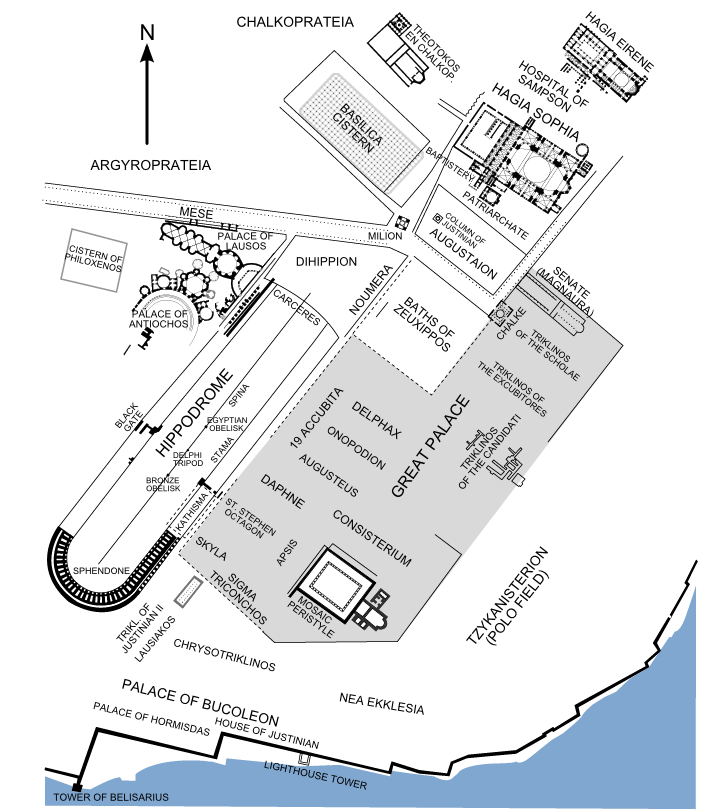
Map of the Imperial District of Byzantine Constantinople, with the Magnaura in the upper right next to the Augustaion

== History ==
Some scholars have claimed that the Magnaura was founded in 425 A.D. during the reign of Emperor Theodosius II. However, others dispute this assertion on the grounds that it arises from an incorrect conflation of the University of Constantinople with the later palace school (ekpaideutērion) housed at the Magnaura that was founded by caesar Bardas in the mid-9th century. The location and architectural features of the Magnaura seem to correspond with those provided by Procopius in his description of the Senate House, which was rebuilt by Justinian I. Around 682, the Magnaura was restored. Later on, this site was often used as a throne room for receptions of foreign ambassadors as well as for public addresses by the emperor and for public assemblies which were often held in the atrium on the western side of the building. Amongst the different ceremonies held at the Magnaura was the silention held at the beginning of Lent, at which the imperial household and members of the Byzantine bureaucracy would gather on its great staircase.

== Description ==
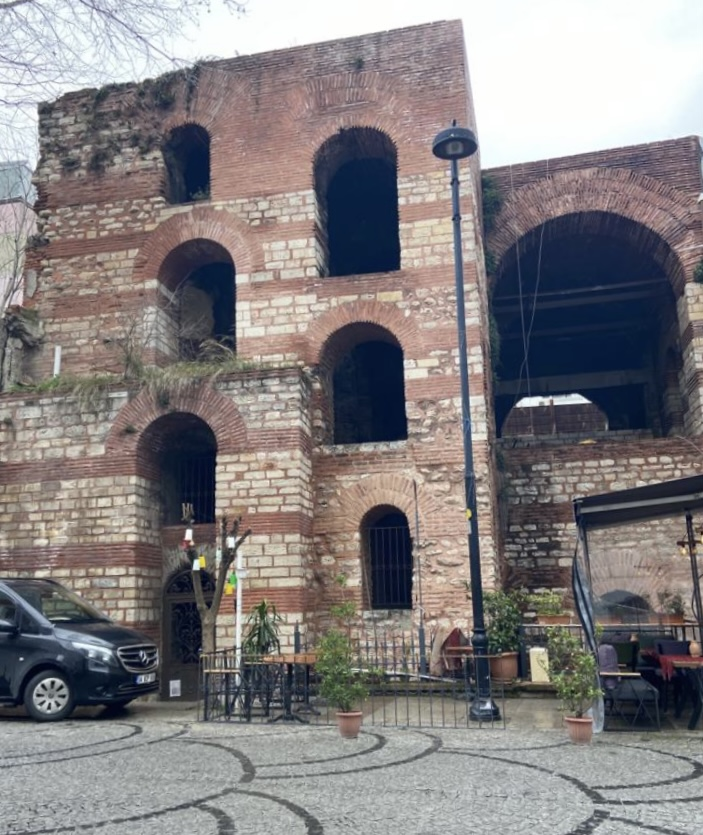
Surviving part of the Magnaura

In his description of the area, Procopius tells of a large marble gateway that led to a peristyle courtyard which stood in front of the Magnaura. The structure of the Magnaura is thought to have followed a basilican plan with two side aisles supporting galleries and multiple apses at its eastern end. A description in the 10th century De Ceremoniis may indicate that it was replaced by a cross-in-square building by that time. One of the most remarked upon features in this building was the so-called Throne of Solomon situated in its central apse, which is said to have been surrounded by automata in the form of trees, singing birds, and roaring lions that awed and delighted visitors. Scholars have described the Magnaura as a material projection of Byzantine imperial power over all subjects of the oikoumene.

== See also ==
- Constantinople
- Byzantine Senate
- Procopius
- University of Constantinople

== Sources ==
- Bury, John. The Cambridge Medieval History, Volume IV: The Eastern Roman Empire (717-1453). New York: The Macmillan Company, 1923
- Brett, Gerard. "The Automata in the Byzantine 'Throne of Solomon.'" Speculum, vol. 29, no. 3 (1954): 477-97
- Dark, Ken. Secular Buildings and the Archaeology of Everyday Life in the Byzantine Empire. Oxford: Oxbow, 2003
- Dohrmann, Natalie and Anette Yoshiko Reed. Jews, Christians, and the Roman Empire: The Poetics of Power in Late Antiquity. Philadelphia: University of Pennsylvania Press, 2013
- Featherstone, Michael, Jean-Michel SpieLemerle, Paul. Byzantine Humanism: The First Phase - Notes and Remarks on Education and Culture in Byzantium from Its Origin to the 10th Century. Sydney: Brill/Byzantina Australiensia, 2017
- Mango, Cyril. "Magnaura." In The Oxford Dictionary of Byzantium, edited by Alexander Kazhdan. Oxford: Oxford University Press.
- Mango, Cyril. The Brazen House: A Study of the Vestibule of the Imperial Palace of Constantinople. Copenhagen: I kommission hos Munksgaard, 1959
- Prokopios, De Aedeficiss
- Rosser, John Hutchins. Historical Dictionary of Byzantium, second edition. Lanham: Scarecrow Press, 2012
- Treadgold, Warren. A History of the Byzantine State and Society. Palo Alto: Stanford University Press, 1997
