= Christopher of Mytilene =

11th-century Byzantine poet and writer

Christophoros of Mytilene (Greek: Χριστόφορος Μυτιληναῖος, romanized: Christophoros Mytilenaios; c. 1000 – after 1050) was a Greek-language poet living in the first half of the 11th century, born in Constantinople. His works include poems on various subjects and four Christian calendars.

== Biography ==
Evidence about Christopher's life is scarce, and mostly comes from his own works or titles which he is given in the manuscripts of his work. Although his epithet implies ancestry in Mytilene on Lesbos, Christopher himself was born in Constantinople, between 1000 and 1015. His family appears to have been wealthy and influential. His poems indicate that he had at least one brother (Ioannes) and sister (Anastaso), both of whom predeceased him, as did his mother. He lived for at least a time in the central Constantinople district of Protasiou.

Christopher was an important official: there is evidence that at different times he held the positions of patrikios, proconsul, protospatharios of the Chrystotriklinos, and krites (judge) of the themes of Armeniakon and Paphlagonia. His works indicate that his acquaintances included monks, bishops, and high-ranking state officials.

Events described in his poems suggest that he started writing in the reign of Romanos III (1028–1034), but most poems can be dated to the reign of Constantine IX (1042–1055), an emperor who favoured culture and literature.

== Works ==
Various Verses (Στίχοι Διάφοροι) is the title of his collection of 145 poems, which covers a wide range of genres and topics. The collection seems to have been arranged chronologically. The text of many poems is severely damaged because they were only preserved in a single manuscript which was attacked by mice. The layout in two columns means alternate lines are missing.

The metre of most poems is the dodecasyllable, but for some Christopher uses the dactylic hexameter, written in artificial Homeric Greek. Elegiac couplets and one anacreontic occur as well.

The content of these poems is rather heterogeneous. The most remarkable among them are satirical. In these poems Christopher makes fun of unsuccessful chariot drivers, cheated husbands, hypocritical monks, pseudo-intellectuals, etc. Other poems are directed against the mice devouring his books, and an owl that prevents him from sleeping. Many poems are epigrams with religious undertones, touching on Biblical figures or Christian feasts. Some longer poems are funeral orations for his mother and his sister. Others describe historical events, such as the death of Romanos III and the riots of 1042. The longest poem is an encomium on the spider. The rest of the collection is filled with epitaphs, riddles, dedicatory epigrams, and the like.

Christopher composed also four calendars in four different metres (hexameter, dodecasyllables, stichera, and canones), commemorating all the saints and feasts of the Orthodox Christian liturgical year.

Christopher's poetry is characterized by a witty tone seldom found in Greek poetry of this period. The mix of Christian and classical elements and the self-asserting intellectual elitism are distinguishing features which link him to other poets of the period, like John Mauropous and Michael Psellos, who also were responding to the cultural climate under Constantine IX.

== Editions ==
- Floris Bernard and Christopher Livanos, eds. and trans., The Poems of Christopher of Mytilene and John Mauropous, Dumbarton Oaks Medieval Library 50 (Cambridge, MA: Harvard University Press, 2018)
- Marc De Groote, ed., Christophori Mitylenaii Versuum variorum Collectio Cryptensis, Corpus Christianorum, series graeca 74 (Turnhout: Brepols, 2012), ISBN 978-2-503-54092-4\
- E. Kurtz, Die Gedichte des Christophoros Mytilenaios (Leipzig: Neumann, 1903)
- A. Rocchi, Versi di Cristoforo Patrizio editi da un codice délia monumentale Badia di Grottaferrata (Rome, 1887)
- A. Rocchi, Codices Cryptenses seu Abbatiae Cryptae Ferratae in Tusculano (Rome, 1884)

== Sources ==
- E. Follieri, I calendari in metro innografico di Cristoforo Mitileneo, I. Introduzione, testo e traduzione, II. Commentario e indici (Bruxelles, 1980).
- Kazhdan, Alexander, ed. (1991). The Oxford Dictionary of Byzantium. Oxford and New York: Oxford University Press. ISBN 0-19-504652-8.
- Livanos, Christopher, "Justice, Equality, and Dirt in the Poems of Christopher of Mytilene," Jahrbuch der Österreichischen Byzantinistik, 57 (2007).
- C. De Stefani, "Notes on Christophoros of Mytilene and Konstantinos Stilbes," Jahrbuch der Österreichischen Byzantinistik, 58 (2008).
