= Jan (ispán) =

Hungarian nobleman

Ispán of Sopron
- Reign: 1071
- Predecessor: first known
- Successor: Heidrich (?)
- Died: after 1071

Jan was a Hungarian nobleman and military general in the second half of the 11th century. He played a decisive role in the royal campaign against the Byzantine Empire in 1071.

== Biography ==
Jan (also Ian or John) elevated into the position of ispán of Sopron County by 1071, during the reign of Solomon, King of Hungary. His dignity is the earliest evidence of the existence of the county since at least the second half of the 11th century.

[...] Thinking that the siege [of Belgrade] placed them in peril, the Greeks and the Bulgarians secretly sent messengers to the Bisseni [Pechenegs] and asked them to come without fear to their help; [...] Misled by these deceitful words, the Bessi hastened to their help, and in their greed for the booty which they hoped to gain from the defeat of Count Vid they threw themselves upon the ranks of the men from Supronium [Sopron], whose commander was Count Ian. He with his men gallantly and courageously withstood the assault of the Bessi, many of whom fell there beneath the edge of the sword, while the rest were taken captive. With very few others, the prince of the Bisseni, whose name was Kazar, barely escaped by flight from the hands of the Hungarians. The King [Solomon] and the Duke [Géza] generously bestowed royal gifts and worthy rewards upon the soldier Ian, who had [himself] brought destruction to many thousands of the Bisseni as a finely polished flint shatters vessels of clay, even before the King and the Duke with their army had arisen from their early meal. [...]

— Illuminated Chronicle

Pecheneg troops pillaged Syrmia (now in Serbia) in 1071. As King Solomon and his cousin, Duke Géza suspected that the soldiers of the Byzantine garrison at Belgrade (Hungarian: Nándorfehérvár) incited the marauders against Hungary, they decided to attack the fortress. The Hungarian army crossed the river Sava and laid siege to Belgrade. Upon the request of the Byzantine commander, Niketas, the Pechenegs sent a relief army, but they were defeated and annihilated by Jan and his troops from Sopron County on their route to Belgrade. Thereafter, the Hungarians took Belgrade after a siege of three months. Following the campaign, Solomon and Géza have gifted and rewarded Jan generously.

Historian Péter Kovács considers the author of the 14th-century Illuminated Chronicle used biblical, antique and medieval literary tropes of the metaphor "tamquam lapis limpidissimus vasa fictilia contrivisset", when described Jan's heroism. Earlier assumptions (for instance, literary historian János Horváth, Jr.) sought that metaphor in the folk tradition. The motif set and lexical-phraseology of Jan's role in the war is based on the biblical story (Books of Samuel) of David and Goliath.

== Sources ==
=== Primary sources ===
- The Hungarian Illuminated Chronicle: Chronica de Gestis Hungarorum (Edited by Dezső Dercsényi) (1970). Corvina, Taplinger Publishing. ISBN 0-8008-4015-1.

=== Secondary studies ===
- Kovács, Péter (2018). "Jan comes mint Dávid. Egy bibliai eredetű szókép a XIV. századi krónikakompozíció 105. fejezetében [Jan comes as David: A Metaphor of Biblical Origin in the 14th Century Chronicle Composition]". In Czeferner, Dóra; Böhm, Gábor; Fedeles, Tamás (eds.). Mesterek és Tanítványok 2. Tanulmányok a bölcsészet- és társadalomtudományok területéről (in Hungarian). University of Pécs. pp. 63–79. ISBN 978-963-429-223-4.
- Zsoldos, Attila (2011). Magyarország világi archontológiája, 1000–1301 [Secular Archontology of Hungary, 1000–1301] (in Hungarian). História, MTA Történettudományi Intézete. ISBN 978-963-9627-38-3.

Political offices
Preceded by first known	Ispán of Sopron; 1071	Succeeded by Heidrich (?)
