= Matthaios Kamariotis =

Greek scholar (d. 1490)

Matthaios Kamariotis (Greek: Ματθαῖος Καμαριώτης; died 1490) was a Greek scholar of the Renaissance era, from Thessaloniki. He was a lecturer at the University of Constantinople and the first director of the Patriarchal Academy of Constantinople (Phanar Greek Orthodox College), founded by the Patriarch Gennadius as a continuation of the University of Constantinople after the Fall of Constantinople.

== Works ==
- Rhetorique, Augsburg, 1596

== See also ==
- Greek scholars in the Renaissance

== Bibliography ==
- Boadjiev, Tzotcho (2019). "Matthaios Kamariotes". In: Brungs, Alexander; Kapriev, Georgi; Mudroch, Vilem (eds). Die Philosophie des Mittelalters 1: Byzanz, Judentum [The Philosophy of the Middle Ages 1: Byzantium, Judaism]. Grundriss der Geschichte der Philosophie, new edition. Basel: Schwabe, ISBN 978-3-7965-2623-7, pp. 239-241.
