= University of Constantinople =

Defunct Eastern Roman university

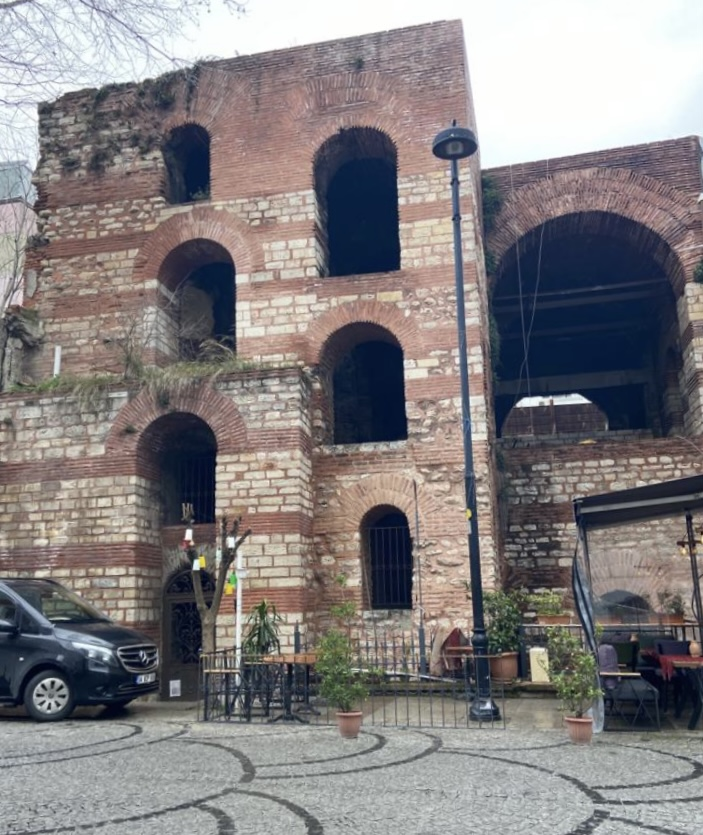
Surviving part of the Magnaura

The Imperial University of Constantinople, sometimes known as the University of the Palace Hall of Magnaura (Greek: Πανδιδακτήριον τῆς Μαγναύρας), was an Eastern Roman educational institution in Constantinople that could trace its origin to 425 AD, when the emperor Theodosius II founded the Pandidakterion (or Pandidacterium) (Medieval Greek: Πανδιδακτήριον).

The Pandidakterion was restructured in 1045 or 1046 by Constantine IX Monomachos who created the Departments of Law (Διδασκαλεῖον τῶν Νόμων) and Philosophy (Γυμνάσιον). The restructuring made it into a "true" university; as such, it is sometimes considered the first university in history.

After a period of almost non-existent advanced learning during the Latin occupation of Constantinople (1204–1261), the Palaiologan Renaissance was kickstarted and various economic schools, colleges, polytechnics, libraries and fine arts academies began operating in the city. All of these, including the University of Constantinople, were shut down after the Fall of Constantinople to the Ottomans.

== History ==
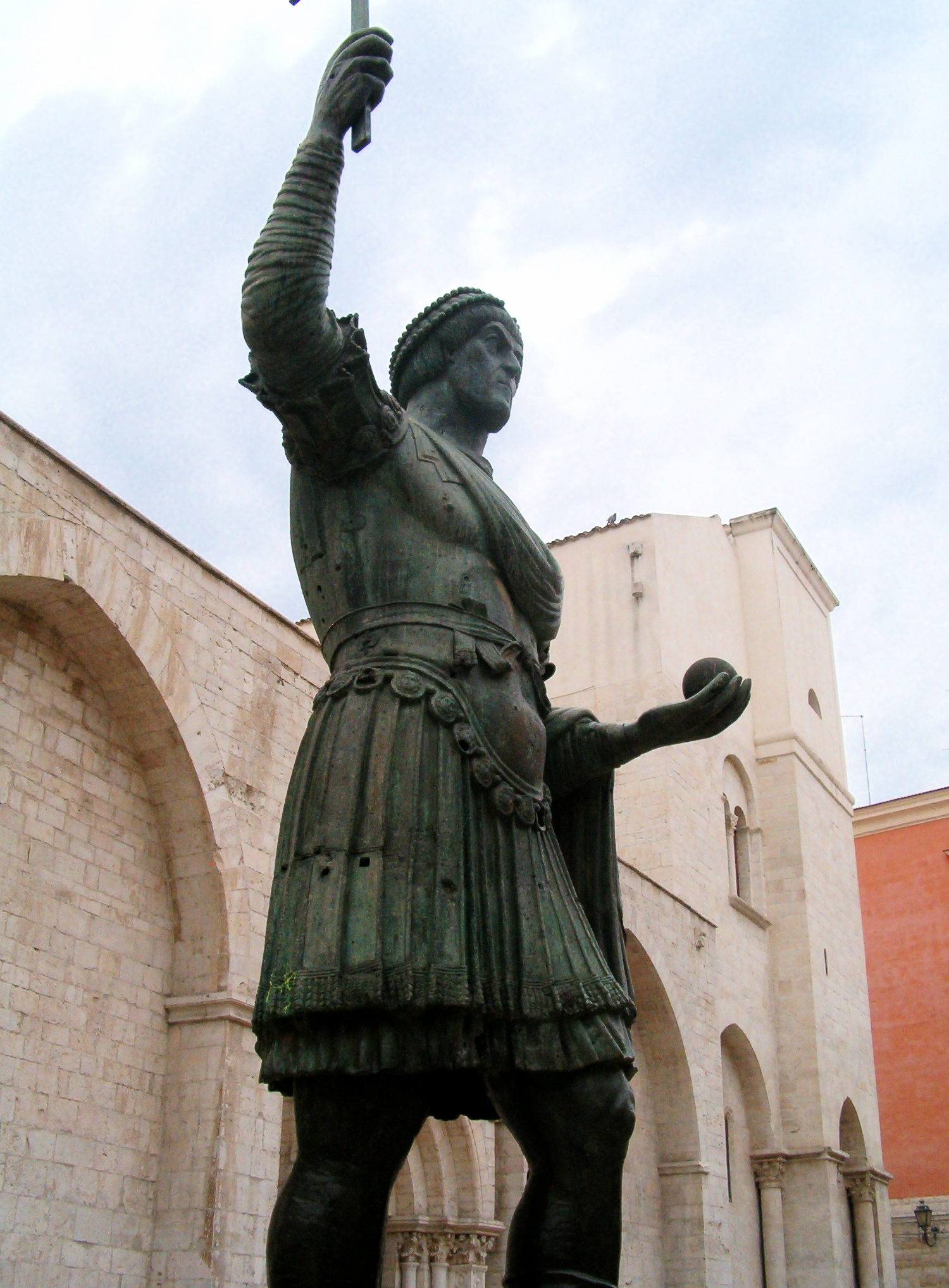
Colossus of Barletta, statue identified with either Leo I, Marcian or Theodosius II, founder of the University of Constantinople.

Byzantine society on the whole was an educated one. Primary education was widely available, sometimes even at village level, and—uniquely in that era—for both sexes. Female participation in culture was relatively high. Scholarship was fostered not only in Constantinople but also in institutions operated in major cities such as Antioch and Alexandria.

The original school, named Pandidakterion, was founded in 425 by Emperor Theodosius II in the Capitolium of Constantinople with 31 chairs: 10 each for Greek and Latin grammar; two for law; one for philosophy; and eight chairs for rhetoric, with five taught in Greek and three in Latin. In total, 15 chairs for Latin and 16 chairs for Greek. The sole purpose of the Pandidakterion before 1045/1046 was to educate civil servants for the administration of the state. However, in 1045/1046, it was restructured and separated into two faculties: the School of Law and the School of Philosophy. They were housed in different buildings. Despite their names, the Schools taught more than law and philosophy, including geography, music, astronomy, rhetoric, grammar, oratory and others. Notable teachers included Michael Psellos, John Xiphilinos, John Italos, Eustratius of Nicaea, Michael of Ephesus and John Mauropous, among others.

The main content of higher education for most students was rhetoric, philosophy and law with the aim of producing competent, learned personnel to staff the bureaucratic postings of state and church. In this sense the university was the secular equivalent of the Theological Schools. The university maintained an active philosophical tradition of Platonism and Aristotelianism, with the former being the longest unbroken Platonic school, running for close to two millennia until the 15th century.

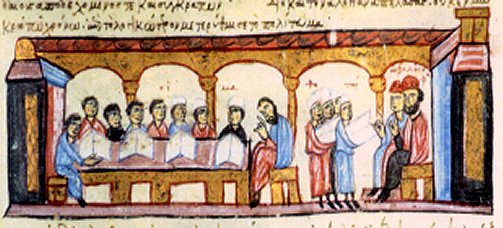
Depiction of a philosophy lesson in the university from the 12th century Madrid Skylitzes.

The School of Magnaura was founded in the 9th century but did not last very long, and in the 11th new schools of philosophy and law were established at the Capitol School. The period of decline began with the Latin conquest of 1204 although the university survived as a non-secular institution under Church management until the Fall of Constantinople in 1453, and was later refounded as the Phanar Greek Orthodox College. The primary university of the city became a madrasa (now Istanbul University), established by Mehmet II following the conquest of the city. Both of these institutions are still operational today.

Matthaios Kamariotis, lecturer of the university, became the first director of Phanar Greek Orthodox College, which was established in 1454.

== Status ==
The Pandidakterion refounded in 1046 is generally recognized as a "university" in that it was, like modern universities, an institution of higher learning with chairs in many fields of study, but some scholars have argued that it was not a "university" because it lacked the corporative structure of the medieval universities of Western Europe, which used the Latin term universitas magistrorum et scholarium for the communities of masters and students that came to define the institutional character of European universities. Nonetheless, the Dictionnaire encyclopédique du Moyen Âge also identifies the Pandidakterion founded in 425 as a "university institution".

== See also ==
- Byzantine Aristotelianism
- Byzantine university
- Faculty and alumni of the University of Constantinople

== Bibliography ==
=== Primary sources ===
- IMPERATORIS THEODOSII CODEX (in Latin). Constantinopolis.

=== Secondary sources ===
- Janin, Raymond (1950). Constantinople Byzantine (in French). Paris: Institut français d'etudes byzantines.
- Athanasios Markopoulos (2019). "Education in Constantinople during the Byzantine Period". History of Istanbul. Vol. 8.
