= Michael Attaleiates =

Byzantine judge and historian (11th century)

- Μιχαὴλ Ἀτταλειάτης
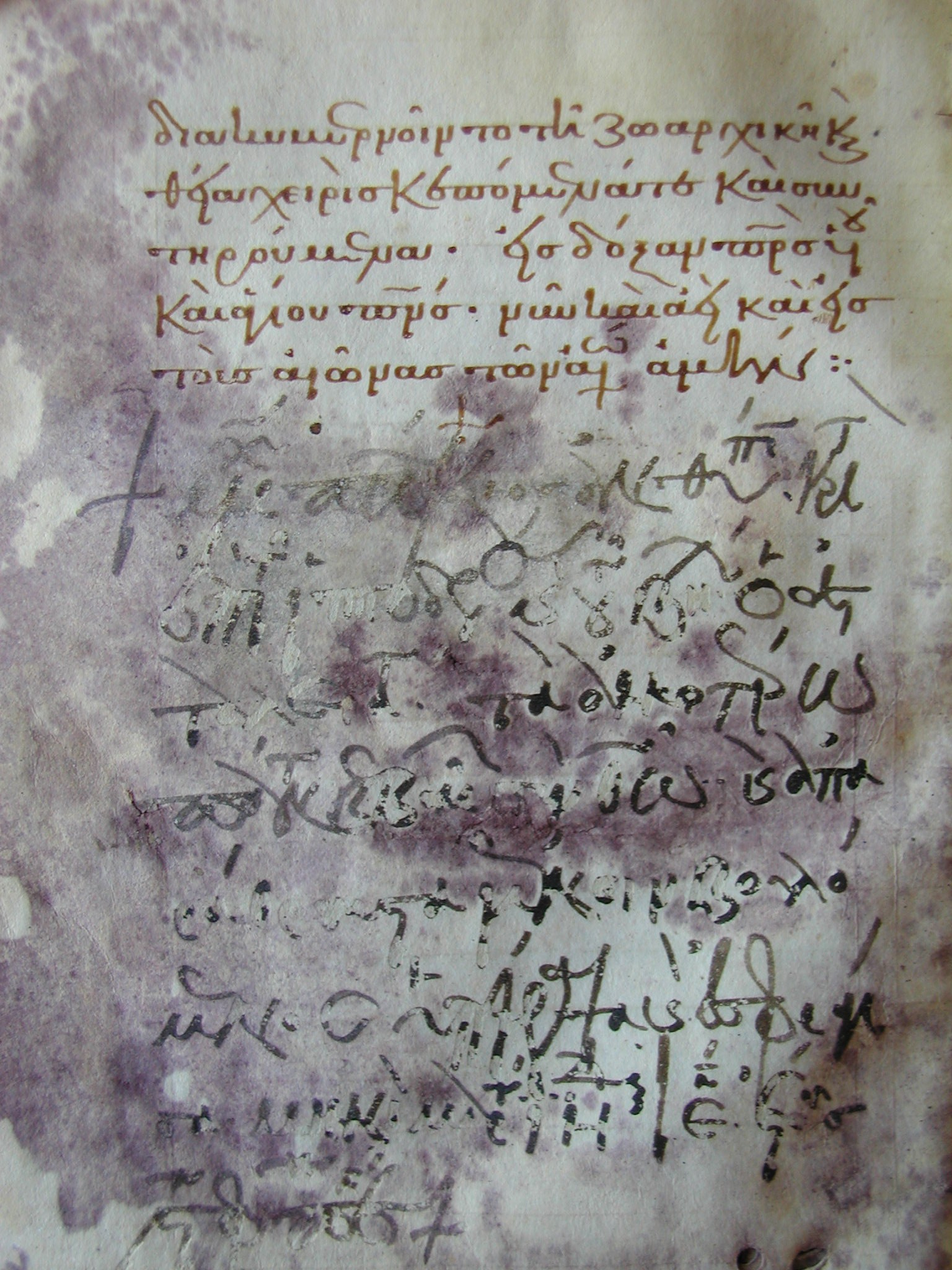
- Autograph Signature of Michael Attaleiates from the Manuscript of the Diataxis.
- Born: c. 1022; Attaleia
- Died: c. 1080; Constantinople
- Occupations: Chronicler, historian, public servant

Michael Attaleiates or Attaliates (Ancient Greek: Μιχαὴλ Ἀτταλειάτης, romanized: Mikhaḕl Attaleiátēs, Byzantine Greek: [mixaˈil atːaliˈatis]; c. 1022 – 1080) was a Byzantine chronicler, public servant and historian active in Constantinople and around the empire's provinces in the second half of the eleventh century. He was a younger contemporary (possibly even a student) of Michael Psellos and likely an older colleague of John Skylitzes, the two other Byzantine historians of the eleventh century whose work survives.

== Life and work ==
Michael Attaleiates was probably a native of Attaleia (now Antalya, in Turkey) and moved to Constantinople some time between, approximately, 1030 and 1040 to pursue studies in law. During years of service in the empire's judicial system he built a small private fortune. Prominence on the judge's bench also brought him to the attention of a number of emperors who rewarded him with some of the highest honours available to civil servants (patrikios and anthypatos).

Attaleiates described himself as facing discrimination because of his foreign background but eventually overcoming it. The Maronite archbishop and historian Youssef Debs argued that Attaleiates was the "Judge of Attalia" a position appointed by the emperor for the Mardaite community present there.

In 1072, Attaleiates compiled for Emperor Michael VII a synopsis of law, known as the Ponema Nomikon, based on the late ninth-century Basilika.

In addition, he drew up an Ordinance for the Poor House and Monastery, which he founded at Constantinople in the mid-1070s. This work, known as the Diataxis, is of value for students of the social, economic, cultural and religious history of Byzantium in Constantinople and the provinces during the eleventh century. It also provides invaluable information regarding the life of Attaleiates himself. It includes a catalogue of the books available in the monastery's library, while also offering details about the founder's fortune in the capital and in Thrace. From the Diataxis we learn that Attaleiates owned numerous properties (both farms and urban real estate) in Constantinople, Raidestos (mod. Tekirdağ), Selymbria (mod. Silivri).

Around 1079/80, Michael Attaleiates circulated The History, a political and military history of the Byzantine Empire from 1034 to 1079. This vivid and largely reliable presentation of the empire's declining fortunes after the end of the Macedonian dynasty, offered Attaleiates the opportunity to engage with political questions of his time also addressed, albeit often from a different point of view, by his contemporary Michael Psellos. The History concludes with a long encomium to Emperor Nikephoros III Botaneiates, to whom the whole work is dedicated. On account of this encomium and dedication, Attaleiates was for years considered an honest supporter of this elderly and largely ineffective emperor. Careful reading of his text, however, suggests that the words of praise may be less than honest. Instead Attaleiates appears to be partial towards the young military commander and future emperor Alexios Komnenos.

Attaleiates probably died around 1080, shortly before the beginning of the Komnenian era. He therefore had no chance to rededicate his work to the founder of the Komnenian dynasty, Alexios I Komnenos, whom The History treats as a potential saviour of the Byzantine state. He was outlived by his son Theodore, who died sometime before 1085. Their bodies, along with those of the judge's two wives, Eirene and Sophia, were put to rest on the grounds of the church of St. George of the Cypresses in the southwestern side of Constantinople. This was the area where the family's Constantinopolitan estates were likely clustered, close to the monastery of Christ Panoikteirmon, of which the Attaleiatai were patrons. One may still visit the church of St George (Samatya Aya Yorgi Rum Ortodoks Kilisesi), which today, after two fires and extensive reconstruction, bears no resemblance to the church of Attaleiates' day.

== The historian's goals ==
Attaleiates’ History is a consciously constructed account of Byzantine military decline. In the context of his analysis, the author frequently deviates from contemporary political and military history and sprinkles the pages of his work with images of Roman Republican glory that are starkly juxtaposed to the ineptitude of his contemporaries. The author's turn to the past is not, however, a sign of idle antiquarianism. This is not an attempt on Attaleiates' part to impress the reader with a display of erudition. Instead, in the civic virtue of The History's Republican heroes the reader detects a quest for a new Roman patriotism that would take the empire out of the crisis. At the same time history-writing allows Attaleiates to reflect on the empire's troubled present through the prism of the past in a manner that hints at his ability to plan for an uncertain future. The History therefore confirms the author's status as a politically engaged official and competent imperial advisor. History-writing in general, and The History in particular, cast Attaleiates as an ambitious, patriotic, and astute observer of political developments in his time, denouncing the failings of Byzantine administration, while engaging in close dialogue on current affairs with his contemporaries about the Roman world unravelling around them.

== Attaleiates and historical causation ==
From the first lines of The History, Attaleiates explains to his readers that he will be seeking the causes behind the various historical events presented in his work. This programmatic statement is taken very seriously by the historian throughout his work. Attaleiates provides, to the degree that it is possible, proper historical analysis for each event and focuses each time on the actions of men. The author's interest in the causes of things also extends to his descriptions of the natural world. Thus natural phenomena, like earthquakes and thunder, are described and explained in The History with what at the time passed as scientific analysis. Writing, however, for an audience steeped in the Christian faith, Attaleiates is cautious and frequently mentions the Christian God as a possible force behind historical and natural events that he otherwise explains away through historical or scientific reasoning. Thus the reader often encounters what appear to be contradictory explanations of a single event. Careful analysis of The History, however, shows the historian's analysis to be weighted in favour of reasoned analysis. At the same time, Attaleiates' invocation of the divine is frequently vague enough to evoke the classical notion of fortune (tyche) rather than the Christian God per se. In that, Attaleiates is a proper disciple of Michael Psellos, the philosopher who marked the Constantinopolitan intellectual scene with his inquisitiveness and search for knowledge.

== Place in the Byzantine intellectual tradition ==
While Attaleiates is mostly studied for his highly informative work of history, and secondarily for the usable historical trivia to be found in the Diataxis, his work, both historical and legal, must be read in the context of the eleventh-century intellectual ferment and florescence. Alexander Kazhdan thought of Attaleiates as a relatively conservative voice aligned with the circle of the patriarch Michael Keroularios. One would do better, however, to think of the judge as part of the fascinating world of intellectuals from Michael Psellos and John Mauropous, to the Xiphilinoi (both monk and patriarch) and Symeon Seth.

== Bibliography ==
=== Primary sources ===
- Michael Attaleiates, The History, trans. Anthony Kaldellis & Dimitris Krallis, (Cambridge/Mass.: Harvard University Press, 2012).
- The History was originally edited by I. Bekker, in the "Corpus Script. Byz." (Bonn, 1853). A new Greek edition and Spanish translation was published by I. Pérez Martín, Miguel Ataliates, Historia, (Nueva Roma 15) Madrid 2002.
- P. Gautier, «La Diataxis de Michel Attaliate», REB 39 (1981), 5-143 for an edition of the Diataxis with French translation. For an English translation see Alice-Mary Talbot in Byzantine Monastic Foundation Documents, ed. John P. Thomas and Angela Constantinides Hero (Washington, DC: Dumbarton Oaks, 2000), 1: 326–76.
- For the law-manual of Attaleiates see Ponema Nomikon, ed. Ioannes Zepos and Panagiotis Zepos. In Jus graecoromanum (Athens: Georgios Phexis and son, 1931), 7: 411-97

=== Modern scholarship ===
- Antonios Vratimos, "Was Michael Attaleiates present at the battle of Mantzikert?" Byzantinische Zeitschrift 105.2 (2012): 829–839
- Dimitris Krallis, Michael Attaleiates and the Politics of Imperial Decline in Eleventh Century Byzantium (Tempe: Arizona Center for Medieval and Renaissance Studies, 2012)
- Dimitris Krallis, "'Democratic' Action in Eleventh-Century Byzantium: Michael Attaleiates' 'Republicanism' in Context," Viator 40.2 (Fall 2009): 35–53
- Dimitris Krallis, "Sacred Emperor, Holy Patriarch: A New Reading of the Clash between Emperor Isaakios I Komnenos and Patriarch Michael Keroularios in Attaleiates' History," Byzantinoslavica 67 (2009): 169–190
- Anthony Kaldellis, "A Byzantine Argument for the Equivalence of All Religions: Michael Attaleiates on Ancient and Modern Romans," International Journal of the Classical Tradition 14 (2007) 1–22.
- Dimitris Krallis, "Michael Attaleiates as a Reader of Psellos" in Barber Ch. ed., Reading Michael Psellos (Leiden, 2006): 167–191
- Athanasios Markopoulos, "The portrayal of the male figure in Michael Attaleiates," in The Empire in Crisis: Byzantium in the 11th century (1025–1081) (Athens, 2003): 215–30
- Speros Vryonis, "Michael Psellus, Michael Attaleiates: the blinding of RomanusIV at Kotyaion, 29 June 1072 and his death on Proti, 4 August 1072," in Porphyrogenita: essays on the history and literature of Byzantium and the Latin East in honour of Julian Chrysostomides (Aldershot, 2003): 3–14
- John Haldon, "The Krites tou Stratopedou: a new office for a new situation?," Travaux et mémoires 14 (Paris, 2002): 279–86
- Alexander P. Kazhdan, "The Social Views of Michael Attaleiates," in eadem, Studies on Byzantine Literature of the Eleventh and Twelfth Centuries (1994): 23–86
- Lia Raffaella Cresci, "Anticipazione e possibilità: moduli interpretative della Storia di Michele Attaliata, Storia e tradizione culturale a Bisanzio fra XI eXII secolo" in Atti della prima Giornatadi Studi Bizantini sotto il patrocinio della Associazione Italiana di Studi Bizantini (Napoli, 1993)
- Lia Raffaella Cresci, "Cadenze narrative e interpretazione critica nell' opera storica di Michele Attaliate", REB 49 (1991): 197–218
- Carlotta Amande, "L'Encomio di Niceforo Botaniate nella storia di Attaliate: modelli, fonti, suggestini letterarie", Serta Historica antiqua 2 (1989): 265–86
- Paul Lemerle, "La Diataxis de Michel Attaleiate (mars 1077)", in eadem, Cinq etudes sur le XI siècle Byzantine (Paris, 1977): 65–112
- Eudoxos Tsolakis, "Aus dem Leben des Michael Attaleiates (Seine Heimatstadt, sein Geburts- und Todesjahr)," BZ 58 (1965), 3–10
