= Xiphilinos =

Byzantine surname

Xiphilinos (or Xiphilinus, Greek: Ξιφιλι̑νος) was a Byzantine family name. The family was from Trebizond and was considered of lowly origin. In the 11th and 12th centuries members were found mainly in the church and the bureaucracy in Constantinople and Thessaloniki. They were intellectuals rather than soldiers. They declined in importance after the sack of Constantinople in 1204.

Known Xiphilinoi include:

- Bardas Xiphilinos (11th century), strategetes of Thessaloniki
- John Xiphilinos (died 1075), judge, became Patriarch John VIII of Constantinople
- Michael Xiphilinos, brother of John VIII
- Constantine Xiphilinos (fl. c. 1070), droungarios tes viglas
- John Xiphilinos the Younger, epitomator of Cassius Dio
- John Xiphilinos (fl. 1082), vestarches
- Nicholas Xiphilinos (fl. 1082), protovestes
- Niketas Xiphilinos (fl. 1088/9), apographeus of Boleron
- Euthymios Xiphilinos (fl. 1091), monk and copyist
- Niketas Xiphilinos (fl. 1151), judge and quaestor
- Donatos Xiphilinos (fl. 1196), judge
- George Xiphilinos (died 1198), became Patriarch George II of Constantinople
- Theodore Xiphilinos (fl. c. 1256), chartophylax of the Great Church in exile

John VIII was probably a brother of Bardas. He was born in Trebizond and his rise to the patriarchate helped establish the family in Constantinople. Constantine and John VIII were friends of Michael Psellos. John VIII and his nephew, John the Younger, both left writings.
