= John VIII of Constantinople =

Ecumenical Patriarch of Constantinople from 1064 to 1075

Saint John VIII of Constantinople
- Ecumenical Patriarch of Constantinople
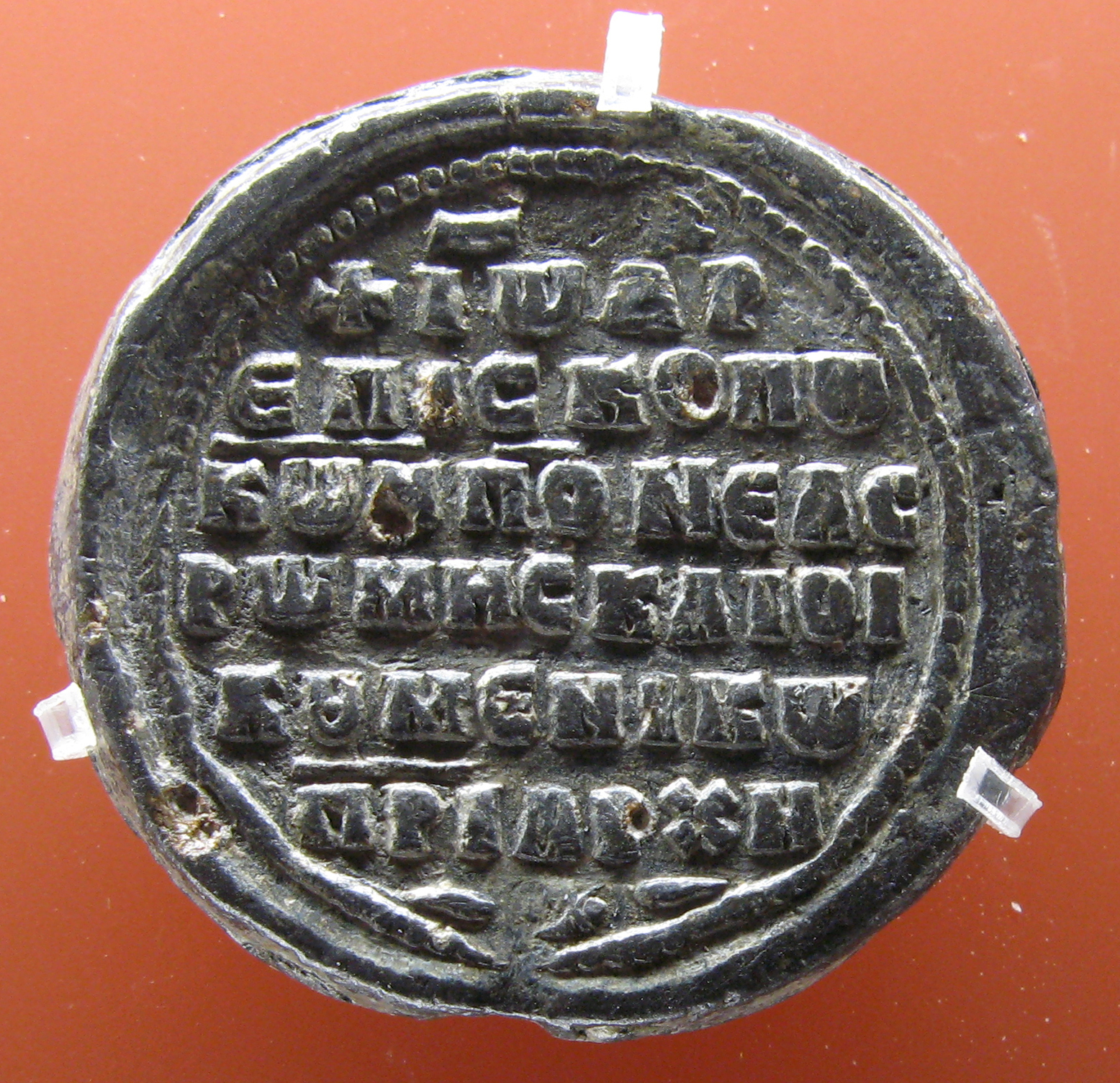
- Seal of John VIII, Patriarch of Constantinople, in lead, 1064-1075
- Church: Eastern Orthodox Church
- In office: 1 January 1064 – 2 August 1075
- Predecessor: Constantine III of Constantinople
- Successor: Cosmas I of Constantinople

Personal details
- Born: John Xiphilinos c. 1010 Trebizond (modern-day Trabzon, Turkey)
- Died: 2 August 1075 Constantinople

Sainthood
- Feast day: 30 August
- Venerated in: Eastern Orthodoxy

Education
- Academic advisor: John Mauropous

Philosophical work
- Institutions: University of Constantinople
- Main interests: Jurisprudence
- Notable ideas: Methodology of jurisprudential research

John VIII of Constantinople (born John Xiphilinos; Greek: Ἰωάννης Ξιφιλῖνος; c. 1010 – 2 August 1075), a native of Trebizond, was a Byzantine intellectual, jurist, and Ecumenical Patriarch of Constantinople from 1064 to 1075. He was the uncle of John Xiphilinus, the Epimator. He is considered "an innovator in the field of the methodology of jurisprudential research".

== Early career ==
John was born in Trebizond to the Xiphilinos family. He pursued studies at the University of Constantinople and eventually became nomophylax of its School of Law. Later he became a monk and was eventually selected by Emperor Constantine X Doukas (1059–1067) to succeed Constantine III of Constantinople as the Ecumenical Patriarch of Constantinople.

== Episcopacy ==
In 1072, John VIII presided over an assembly of metropolitans and archbishops at the oratory of Saint Alexius in which the question of the election of bishops to vacancies was discussed. Michael I of Constantinople had forbidden metropolitans who were resident in Constantinople from participating in such elections. John, however, recognised that metropolitans sometimes had to remain for a long period in the capital due to ecclesiastical business or illness. The assembly with John's consent decreed that metropolitans who gave the patriarch advance notification of their intent could again vote while resident in Constantinople. After his death, his remains were buried at the monastery of Angourion on 2 August 1075.

John VIII wrote a hagiography of Saint Eugenios of Trebizond.

John VIII has been canonised in the Eastern Orthodox Church and his feast day is celebrated on 30 August.

== Notes and references ==
Eastern Orthodox Church titles
Preceded by Constantine III	Ecumenical Patriarch of Constantinople; 1064 – 1075	Succeeded by Cosmas I
