= John Mauropous =

Byzantine cleric & poet (c.1000–c.1080)

Saint John Mauropous
- Born: c. 1000; Paphlagonia
- Died: c. 1080
- Scientific career
- Fields: Rhetoric; Poetry; Hymnography; Theology
- Notable students: Constantine Leichoudes, Michael Psellos, John Xiphilinos

John Mauropous (Greek: Ἰωάννης Μαυρόπους, Iōánnēs Maurópous, lit. "John Blackfoot"; c. 1000 – c. 1080) was a Byzantine Eastern Orthodox cleric, poet, hymnographer, and author of letters and orations, who lived in the 11th century.

== Life ==
John Mauropous was born in Paphlagonia around 1000. He came to Constantinople, and quickly gained a reputation as a teacher. Among his students, Michael Psellos was to be the most important. It was also Psellos who introduced him to the emperor Constantine IX Monomachos (1042–1055). For a couple of years, Mauropous belonged to the favoured circle of poets and scholars that Constantine gathered around him; he functioned as a court orator. But for an unknown reason, these friends suddenly fell from favour around the year 1050, and presumably on this occasion, Mauropous was appointed metropolitan of Euchaita. In many letters, Mauropous complained of this "honourable exile", and asked his friend Psellos to urge the succeeding emperors to call Mauropous back to the capital. This seems to have succeeded at the end of Mauropous' life: he retired to the monastery of Agia Petra in Constantinople. He died presumably in the 1080s.

== Work ==
It seems that Mauropous had prepared during his lifetime a collection of his own literary works. The manuscript Vaticanus Graecus 676 is a very close copy of this collection. That collection consists of ninety-nine poems (epigrams, polemical and autobiographical poems, funeral orations in verse), seventy-seven letters and thirteen speeches (with for the most part religious content).

Apart from these works, Mauropous composed a huge amount of liturgical canons. Mauropous has been seen as a precursor of the new cultural mentality in mid-11th century Byzantium. The typical blend of religious piety and classical culture links him with his pupil Psellos, and contemporary poets like Christopher of Mytilene. A particular theme in his poems and letters are the vicissitudes and dangers of public life and political careers, which is not surprising given the political and social instability of this period.

== Editions ==
- Johannis Euchaitarum metropolitae quae supersunt in cod. Vaticano graeco 676 Ed. P. de Lagarde and J. Bollig. Berlin 1882 (Standard modern edition).
- Karpozilos A., The Letters of Ioannes Mauropous, Metropolitan of Euchaita. Ed. and trans. Apostolos Karpozilos (Thessalonike: Association for Byzantine Research, 1990).
- Follieri E., "The 'Living Heirmologion' in the Hymnographic Production of John Mauropus, Metropolitan of Euchaita", Studies in Eastern Chant 4 (1979) 54-75 (for references to publications of liturgical works).
- Tre canoni di Giovanni Mauropode in onore di santi militari. Ed. and trans. Francesco d’Aiuto (Rome: Accademia Nazionale dei Lincei, 1994).
- Ufficio di Giovanni Mauropode Euchaita composto dal nipote Teodoro. Ed. Silvio Giuseppe Mercati, in Collectanea Byzantina (Rome: Dedalo Libr, 1970).
- Novella Constitutio saec. XI medii, quae est de schola juris Constantinopoli constituenda et legum custode creando, a Ioanne Mauropode conscripta a Constantino IX Monomacho promulgata. Ed. A. Salač (Prague, 1954).
