= John Xiphilinus (historian) =

11th century Byzantine monk and historian

John Xiphilinus or Joannes Xiphilinos (Greek: Ἰωάννης Ξιφιλῖνος), epitomator of Dio Cassius, lived at Constantinople during the latter half of the 11th century AD. He was a monk and a member of the Xiphilinus family, a nephew of Patriarch John VIII of Constantinople, a well-known preacher (Migne, Patrologia Graeca, cxx.).

The epitome of Dio was prepared by order of Michael Parapinaces (1071–1078), but is incomplete. It comprises books 36–80, the period included being from the times of Pompey and Caesar down to Alexander Severus. In book 70 the reign of Antoninus Pius and the early years of Marcus Aurelius appear to have been missing in his copy, while in books 78 and 79 a mutilated original must have been used. Xiphilinus divided the work into sections, each containing the life of an emperor. He omitted the names of the consuls and sometimes altered or emended the original. The epitome is valuable as preserving the chief incidents of the period for which the authority of Dio is wanting.
