= Michael Psellos =

Byzantine monk, writer and court official (c. 1018 – c. 1096)

- Μιχαὴλ Ψελλός
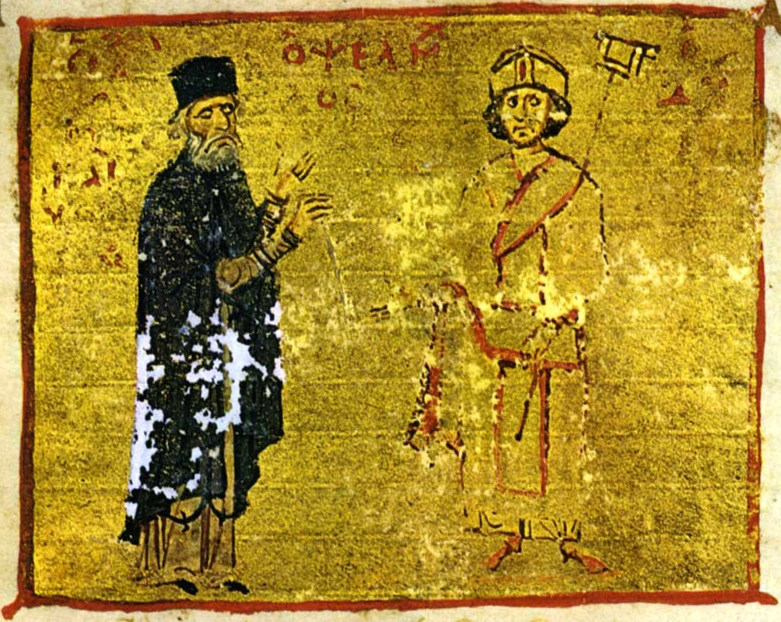
- Michael Psellos (left) with his student, Byzantine emperor Michael VII Doukas
- Born: Constantine Psellos c. 1018; Constantinople
- Died: c. 1096
- Scientific career
- Fields: Theology; philosophy; logic; psychology; historiography; music theory
- Workplaces: University of Constantinople
- Academic advisors: John Mauropous
- Notable students: Michael Attaleiates, Michael VII Doukas, John Italus, Ioane Petritsi

Michael Psellos or Psellus (Greek: Μιχαὴλ Ψελλός, romanized: Michaḗl Psellós, Byzantine Greek: [mixaˈil pseˈlos]; c. 1018 – c. 1096) was a Byzantine monk, savant, writer, philosopher, imperial courtier, historian, and music theorist. He was born in 1017 or 1018, and is believed to have died in 1078, although it has also been maintained that he remained alive until 1096. He served as a high ranking courtier and advisor to several Byzantine emperors and was instrumental in the re-positioning of power of those emperors.

Psellos made lasting contributions to Byzantine culture by advocating the revival of Byzantine classical studies, which would later influence the Italian Renaissance, as well as by interpreting Homeric literature and Platonic philosophy as precursors to and integral components of Christian doctrine. His texts combined theology, philosophy, and psychology. Among his most famous works are his Commentary on Plato's Teachings on the Origin of the Soul, and the Chronographia, a series of biographies from emperor Basil II to Nikephoros III, which serves as a valuable source on the history of the 11th-century Byzantine Empire.

== Biography and political career ==
The main sources of information about Psellos's life are his works, which contain extensive autobiographical passages. Michael Psellos was probably born in Constantinople. His family hailed from Nicomedia and, according to his own testimony, counted members of the consular and patrician elite among its ancestors. His baptismal name was Constantine; Michael was the monastic name he chose when he entered a monastery later in life. "Psellos" ('the stammerer') probably was a personal by-name referring to a speech defect.

Constantine Psellos was educated in Constantinople. At around the age of ten, he was sent to work outside the capital as a secretary of a provincial judge, to help his family raise the dowry for his sister. When his sister died, he gave up that position and returned to Constantinople to resume his studies. While studying under John Mauropus, he met the later Patriarchs Constantine Leichoudes and John Xiphilinos, and the later emperor Constantine X Doukas. For some time, he worked in the provinces again, now a judge. Some time before 1042 he returned again to Constantinople, where he got a junior position at court as a secretary (ὑπογραμματεύς) in the imperial chancellery and began a rapid ascent at court. He became an influential political advisor to emperor Constantine IX Monomachos (reigned 1042–1055) and became the leading professor at the University of Constantinople, bearing the honorary title of "Chief of the Philosophers" (ὕπατος τῶν φιλοσόφων hypatos tōn philosophōn).

Towards the end of Monomachos's reign, Psellos found himself under political pressure for some reason and decided to leave court, entering the Olympus monastery on Mount Olympus in Bithynia in 1054. After Monomachos's death he was recalled to court by his successor, Empress Theodora (reigned 1055–1056). Throughout the following years, he remained active in politics, serving as a high-ranking political advisor to successive emperors. He played a decisive political role in the transition of power from Michael VI to Isaac I Komnenos in 1057; then from Isaac Komnenos to Constantine X Doukas (1059), then again from Romanos IV Diogenes to Michael VII Doukas (1071). As Psellos had served as Michael's teacher during the reign of Michael's father Constantine, and as he had played an important role in helping Michael gain power against his adversary and stepfather Romanos, Psellos probably entertained hopes of an even more influential position as a teacher and advisor under him. Michael seems to have been less inclined towards protecting Psellos and after the mid-1070s there is no more information about any role played by Psellos at court. As his autobiographic accounts cease at this point, there is little reliable information about his later years. Some scholars believe that Psellos had to retreat into a monastery again at some time during the 1070s.

Following a remark by Psellos's fellow historian Joannes Zonaras, it is believed by most scholars that Psellos died soon after the fall of Michael VII in 1078, although some scholars have also proposed later dates. What is known is that Theophylact of Bulgaria wrote a letter to Psellos's brother comforting him on the death of his brother saying that, "Your brother has not died, but has departed to God released of both a painful life and disease".

== Chronographia ==
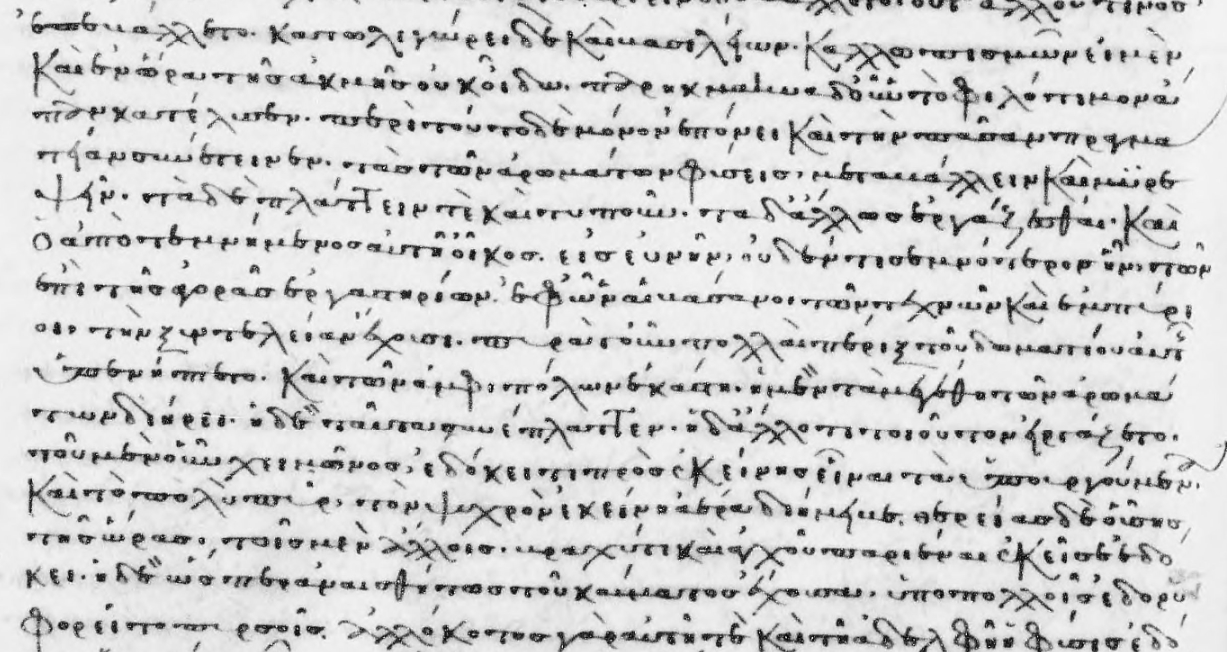
Excerpt from Chronographia discussing empress Zoe's love of perfumes, 15th century copy

The Chronographia (Greek: Χρονογραφία), a history of the Byzantine emperors during the 100 years leading up to Psellos's own time, is probably Psellos's best known and most accessible work. It covers the reigns of 14 emperors and empresses, beginning with the almost 50-year-long reign of Basil II, the "Bulgar-Slayer" (976–1025) and ending some time during the reign of Michael VII Doukas (1071–1078). It is structured mainly as a series of biographies. Unlike most other historiographical works of the period, it emphasizes the description of characters rather than details of political and military events.

It also includes extensive autobiographical elements about Psellos's political and intellectual development and it gives far greater weight to those periods when Psellos was active in politics, especially the reign of Constantine IX, giving the whole work almost the character of a political memoir. It is believed to have been written in two parts. The first covers the emperors up to Isaac I Komnenos. The second, which has a much more strongly apologetic tone, is in large parts an encomium on Psellos's protectors, the emperors of the Doukas dynasty. Byzantinist historian Judith Herrin said: "This book by Michael Psellus is so fascinating that if you only read one book about Byzantium, by a Byzantine, that would be the one I'd choose".

== Other works ==
Rulers of the Byzantine Empire in the 11th century. Based on Chronographia.

1. "Historia syntomos", a shorter, didactic historical text in the form of a world chronicle.
2. A large number of scientific, philosophical and religious treatises. He wrote or compiled an important work on philosophy, the De omnifaria doctrina. Other works deal with topics such as astronomy, medicine, music, jurisprudence, physics, and laography.
3. De operatione dæmonum (On the Operation of Demons), which offered a demonic taxonomy as part of an anti-Manichaean dialogue. He wrote a treatise on alchemy, theurgy (summoning spirits) despite the study being forbidden by the church.
4. Various didactic poems on topics such as grammar and rhetorics.
5. Three Epitaphioi or funeral orations over the patriarchs Michael Keroularios, Constantine III Leichoudes and John Xiphilinos.
6. A funeral oration for his mother, including a large amount of autobiographic information.
7. Several panegyrics, persuasive speeches (including works against the Bogomils and Euchites) and speeches addressed to his patron emperors at court.
8. Several hundred personal letters.
9. Rhetorical exercises and essays on set themes.
10. Occasional, satirical, and epigrammatic verse.

== Personality ==
Psellos was universally educated and had a reputation for being one of the most learned men of his time. He prided himself on having reintroduced to Byzantine scholarship a serious study of ancient philosophy, especially of Plato. His predilection for Plato and other pagan (often Neoplatonic) philosophers led to doubts about his religious orthodoxy among some of his contemporaries and at one point he was forced to make a public profession of faith, in his defense. He prided himself on being a master of rhetoric, combining the wisdom of the philosopher and the persuasiveness of the rhetorician. This made him the model of a political leader and advisor. Among modern commentators, Psellos's penchant for long autobiographical digressions in his works has earned him accusations of vanity and ambition. At the same time, his political career and the contents of his Chronographia have led commentators to characterize him as obsequious and opportunistic, because of his ostensibly uncritical stance towards some of the emperors and because of the many shifts in his political loyalty over the course of his life.

Other commentators argue that there is a powerful ironic undercurrent running through his work, especially the Chronographia, transmitting highly critical and subversive messages about the emperors portrayed or even about Byzantine Christian beliefs and morality at large. Serious questions were raised during Psellos's life concerning his religious beliefs. According to Byzantinist Anthony Kaldellis, "In 1054 he [Psellos] was accused by his erstwhile friend, the future Patriarch John Xiphilinos, of forsaking Christ to follow Plato." Even stronger doubts arose concerning Psellos's student, John Italos, who succeeded Psellos as Chief of the Philosophers. Italos was publicly accused of teaching such "Hellenizing" ideas as metempsychosis and the eternity of the world. Italos faced such accusations twice and both times he confessed and recanted.

== Pseudo-Psellos ==
It was once thought that there was another Byzantine writer of the same name, Michael Psellos the Elder (now also called Pseudo-Psellos), who lived on the island of Andros in the 9th century, and who was a pupil of Photius and teacher of emperor Leo VI the Wise. Michael Psellos was also called "the younger" by some authors. This belief was based on an entry in a medieval chronicle, the Σύνοψις Κεδρηνοῦ-Σκυλίτση, which mentions the name in that context. It is now believed that the inclusion of the name Psellos in this chronicle was the mistake of an ignorant copyist at a later time, and that no "Michael Psellos the elder" existed. The term "Pseudo-Psellos" is also used in modern scholarship to describe the authorship of several later works that are believed to have been falsely ascribed to Psellos in Byzantine times.

== References in literature ==
In the gloss of Samuel Taylor Coleridge's poem "The Rime of the Ancient Mariner", there is a reference to "the Platonic Constantinopolitan, Michael Psellus" as an authority on "the invisible inhabitants of this planet, neither departed souls nor angels".

The British poet Christopher Middleton includes a poem about Psellus in his 1986 collection Two Horse Wagon Going By, "Mezzomephistophelean Scholion".

Psellos also appears in Tim Severin's novel Viking: King's Man, the final piece of the Viking Trilogy.

== Editions ==
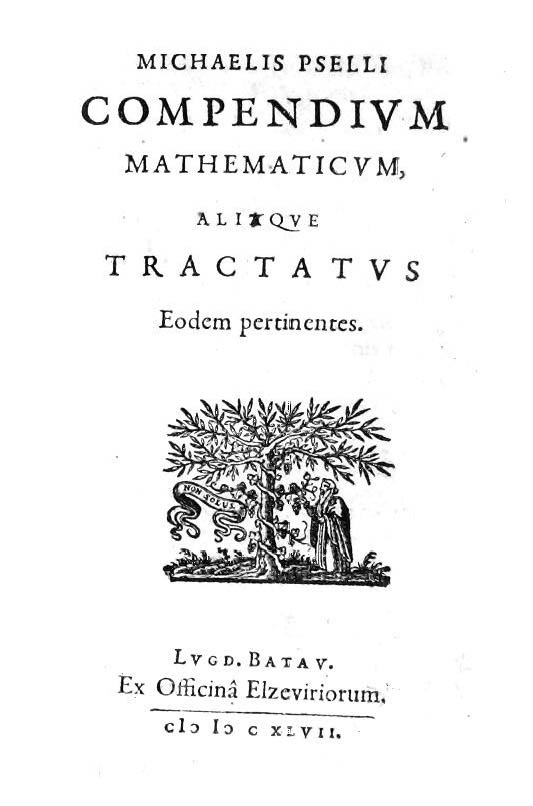
Compendium mathematicum, 1647

- Psellus, Michael (1647). Compendium mathematicum (in Latin). Leiden: Bonaventura Elzevier, Abraham Elzevier.
- Chronographie ou histoire d'un siècle de Byzance (976–1077). Ed. Émile Renauld. 2 vols. Paris 1926/28. [Standard modern edition].
- Imperatori di Bisanzio (Cronografia). Ed. Salvatore Impellizzeri. 2 vols. Vicenza 1984. [New critical edition and Italian translation.]
- Chronographia, ed. E. R. A. Sewter. London 1953. English translation, Full online text.
  - Reprinted by Penguin Classics as Fourteen Byzantine Rulers with the author's cognomen spelled Latin-style as "Psellus".
- Chronographia, ed. Vrasidas Karalis. 2 vols. Athen 1992/96 [Modern Greek translation].
- Vidas de los emperadores des Bizancio (Cronografia). Ed. Juan Signes Codoñer. Madrid 2005 [Spanish translation].
- Autobiografia (Encomio per la madre). Ed. Ugo Criscuolo. Naples 1989.
- De omnifaria doctrina. [Διδασκαλία παντοδαπή] Ed. Leendert G. Westerink. Utrecht 1948.
- De operatione daemonum. Ed. Jean-François Boissonade. Nürnberg 1838, reprint Amsterdam 1964.
- De operatione daemonum. Tr. Marcus Collision. Sydney 1843. Full online text
- '"Éloge inédit du lecteur Jean Kroustoulas." Ed. Paul Gautier. Rivista di studi bizantini e neoellenici, n.s. 17–19 (27–29), 1980–1982: 119–147.
- Epistola a Giovanni Xifilino. Ed. Ugo Criscuolo. Naples 1990.
- Epistola a Michele Kerulario. Ed. Ugo Criscuolo. Naples 1990.
- Historia Syntomos. Ed. Willem J. Aerts. Berlin 1990.
- Orationes hagiographicae. Ed. Elizabeth A. Fisher. Stuttgart/Leipzig 1994.
- Orationes panegyricae. Ed. George T. Dennis. Stuttgart/Leipzig 1994.
- Oratoria minora. Ed. Antony R. Littlewood. Leipzig 1984.
- Orazione in memoria di Constantino Lichudi. Ed. Ugo Criscuolo. Messina 1983.
- Philosophica minora I. Ed. John M. Duffy. Stuttgart/Leipzig 1992.
- Philosophica minora II. Ed. Dominic J. O'Meara. Leipzig 1989.
- Poemata. Ed. Leendert G. Westerink. Stuttgart/Leipzig 1992.
- Scripta minora magnam partem adhuc inedita. 2 vols. Ed. Eduard Kurtz, Franz Drexl. Milan 1936/41.
- Essays on Euripides and George of Pisidia and on Heliodorus and Achilles Tatius. Ed. Andrew R. Dyck. Wien 1989.
- Theologica I. Ed. Paul Gautier. Leipzig 1989.
- Theologica II. Ed. Leendert G. Westerink, John M. Duffy. München/Leipzig 2002.

== See also ==
- Byzantine Aristotelianism
