= Bardas Skleros =

10th-century Byzantine general

- Βάρδας Σκληρός
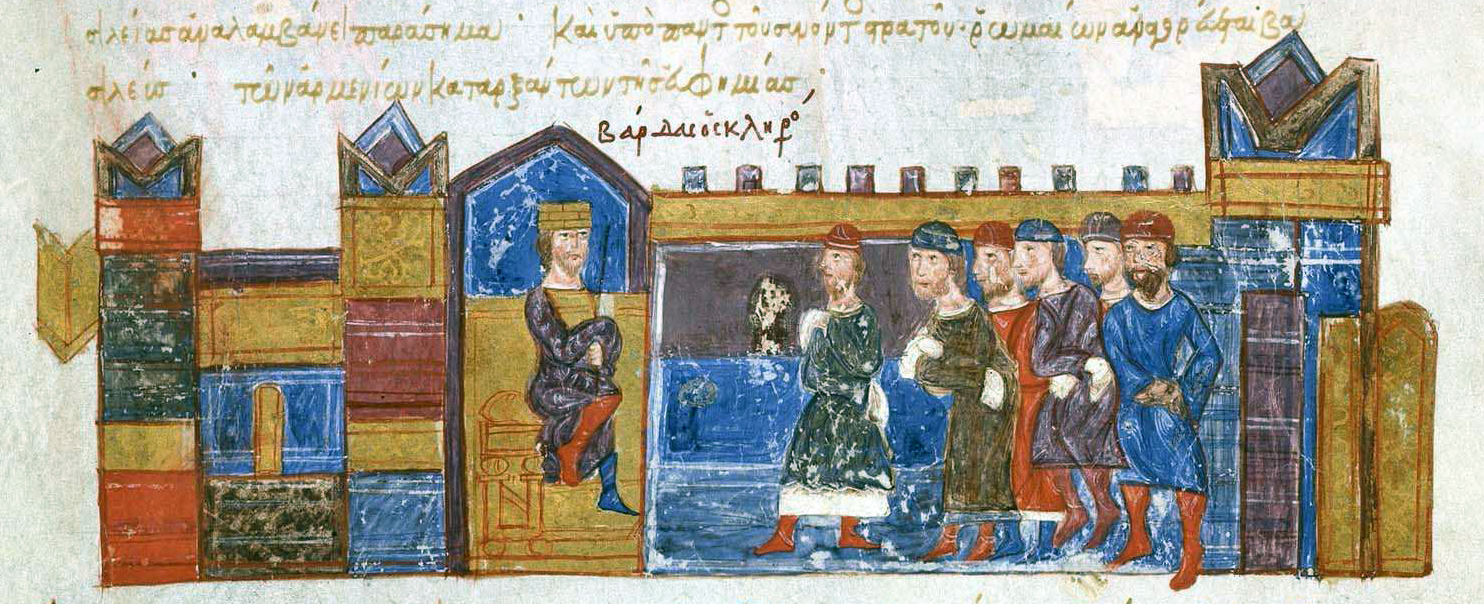
- Proclamation of Skleros as Emperor, miniature from the Madrid Skylitzes
- Died: 6 March 991
- Other name: Sclerus
- Military career
- Allegiance: Byzantine
- Rank: General
- Conflicts: Battle of Arcadiopolis, Battle of Pankalia

Bardas Skleros (Greek: Βάρδας Σκληρός) or Sclerus was a Byzantine general who led a wide-scale Asian rebellion against Emperor Basil II during the years 976 to 979.

== Background ==
Bardas' father Niketas Skleros belonged to the great family of the Skleroi, which owned enormous estates at the eastern outskirts of Asia Minor. His mother Gregoria was daughter of Basil and granddaughter of Basil I's brother Bardas. The greatest coup of his early career was a brilliant defense of Constantinople against the army of Svyatoslav I of Kiev in 970. During the Battle of Arcadiopolis, he reportedly managed to inflict as many as 20,000 casualties on the Rus, while the campaign claimed the lives of merely 25 Byzantine soldiers.

After he had shown himself equal to dealing with the fiercest enemies of Byzantium, Bardas became a trusted advisor to John I Tzimiskes, who was his brother-in-law and a fellow Armenian. Upon John's death, Skleros aspired to replace him as an acting emperor. The eunuch Basil Lekapenos, who actually led the imperial government, entertained other plans, however, deposing Bardas from his key post of general in the East in 976.

According to Michael Psellos, Skleros was "a man who was not only a competent planner, but extremely clever in carrying out his schemes, possessed of vast wealth (no mean asset in one who aimed at a throne), with the prestige of royal blood and of success in great wars, with all the military caste at his side to help on his enterprise."

== Rebellion ==
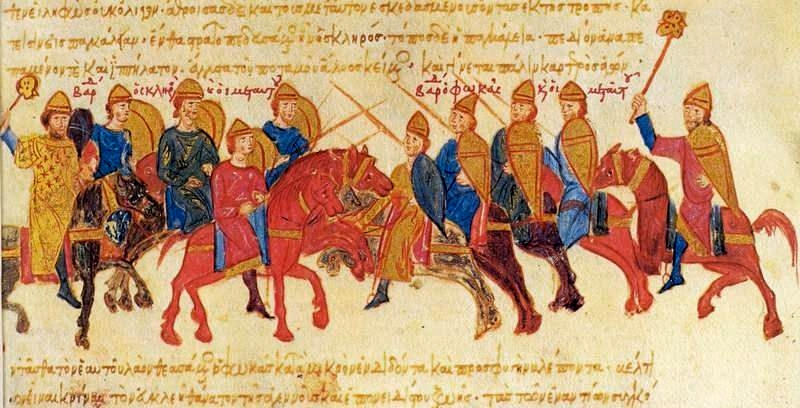
Clash between the armies of Skleros and Phokas, miniature from the Madrid Skylitzes

Upon hearing the news of his deposition, Skleros came to an agreement with local Armenian, Georgian and even Muslim rulers who all vowed to support his claims to the imperial crown. He successfully stirred up rebellion among his relatives and adherents in the Asian provinces, rapidly making himself master of Caesarea, Antioch, and most of Asia Minor.

After several navy commanders defected to Skleros's side, he dashed to Constantinople, threatening to blockade the Dardanelles. The rebel navy under Michael Kourtikios raided the Aegean and attempted to blockade the Hellespont, but were defeated by the Imperial Fleet under the command of Theodoros Karantenos.

Having lost supremacy at sea, Skleros at once laid siege to the town of Nicaea, which was considered a key to the capital. The town was fortified by Manuel Erotikos Komnenos, father of the future emperor Isaac Komnenos and progenitor of the Komnenoi dynasty.

Meanwhile, Basil recalled from exile Bardas Phokas the Younger, a general who had revolted in the previous reign and been interned in a monastery for seven years. Phokas proceeded to Sebastea in the East, where his family demesnes were situated. He came to an understanding with David III Kuropalates of Tao, who pledged 12,000 Georgian horsemen under the command of John Tornikios to Phokas' aid.

Skleros instantly left Nicaea for the East and defeated Phokas in two battles, but the latter was victorious in a third. On 24 March 979, the two leaders clashed in single combat, with Skleros cutting the right ear of Phocas' horse with his lance before sustaining a grave wound to the head. The rumour of his death put his army to flight, but Skleros himself found shelter with his Muslim allies. Thereupon the rebellion was subdued without difficulty.

== Later years ==
After the Asian potentates refused to support his further operations against Constantinople, Skleros and his family retreated to Baghdad in 980. They resided in honourable captivity at the Abbasid Caliph's court for six years, dreaming about the invasion of Byzantium.

In 987, Skleros was finally recalled to his homeland by Phokas, who took advantage of the Bulgarian wars to aim at the crown. Skleros promptly mustered an army to support Phokas's cause, but his plans of profiting from the attendant disorders were frustrated when Phokas had him committed to prison. Upon Phokas' death at the Battle of Abydos in 989, Skleros succeeded him as the leader of the rebellion: "The truth was, the men who had enrolled in Skleros's army were no longer divided in their loyalties: every one of them was a declared rebel. Their leader inspired them with his own resolute determination and bound them into one coherent body. By favours he won their loyalty, by his kindliness he earned their devotion. He reconciled their differences, ate at the same table as his men, drank from the same cup, called them by name, and by his flattery bound them to his allegiance" (Michael Psellos).

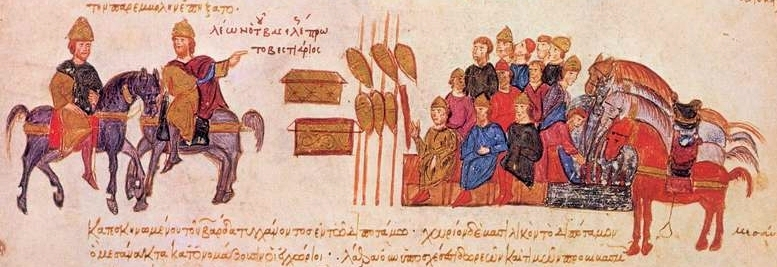
Protovestiarios Leo trying to win over the army of Skleros

The date of his surrender to the authorities is disputed, as are the circumstances. In 991, Skleros, a blinded and broken man, then residing in semi-captivity in Thrace, was visited by Emperor Basil II on his way to Bulgaria. The famous rebel accepted the title of curopalates and died several days later, presumably on 6 March.

== Descendants ==
The bloodline of Bardas Skleros continued, however, through his son Romanos Skleros. A grandson, Basil Skleros, was married to a sister of Emperor Romanos III, sometimes called Helena or Pulcheria Argyra. One of Basil's nieces, Pulcheria Skleraina, married Constantine Monomachos, who would become Emperor, while Basil's grandniece Maria Skleraina became mistress of Constantine. His brother Constantine Skleros (c. 920–930 – 989 or 991) married Sophia Phokaina, the daughter of Kouropalatēs Leo Phokas, brother of Emperor Nikephoros II (c. 912–969), and most probably their daughter was Empress Theophanu.

== See also ==
- Badh ibn Dustak

== Sources ==
- Catherine Holmes: Basil II and the Governance of Empire, 976–1025. Oxford University Press, Oxford 2005, ISBN 0-19-927968-3.
- Cheynet, J.-C.; Vannier, J.-F. (2003). "Les Argyroi". Zbornik Radova Vizantološkog Instituta (in French). 40: 57–90. doi:10.2298/ZRVI0340057C. ISSN 0584-9888.
- Norwich, John Julius (1993), Byzantium: The Apogee, Penguin, ISBN 0-14-011448-3
