= Skleros =

Noble Byzantine family

Skleros Σκληρός Sclerus
- Family
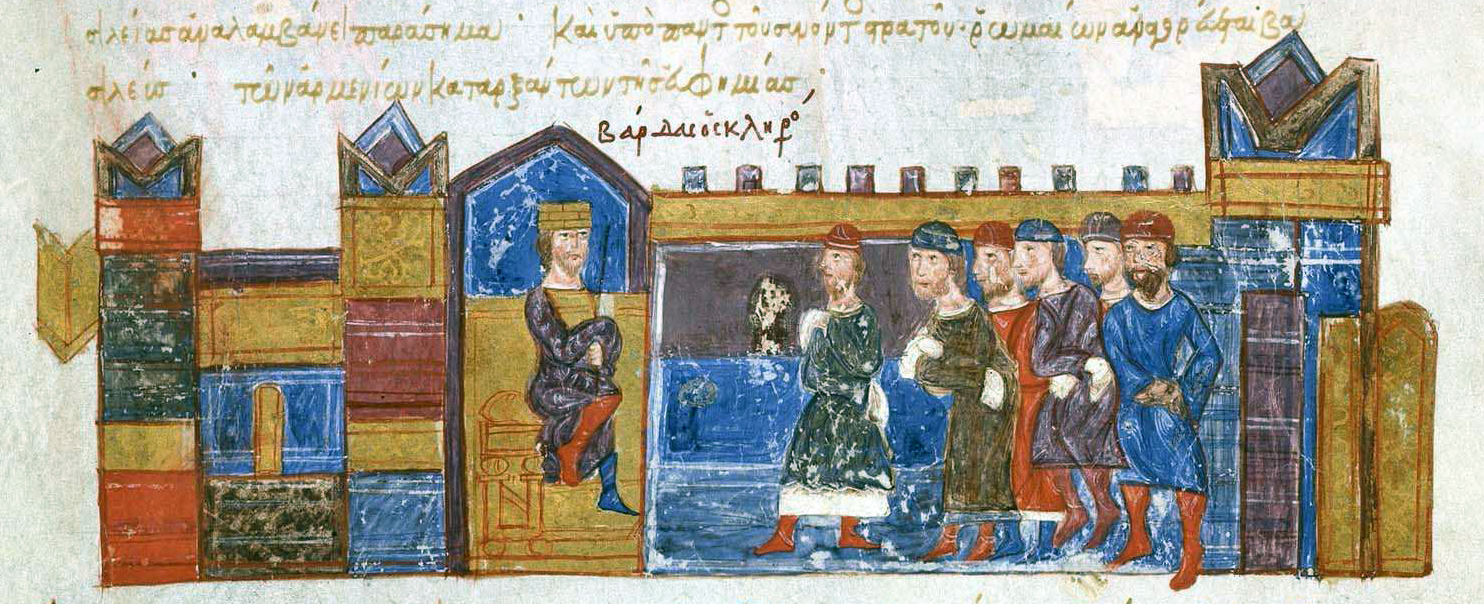
- Bardas Skleros receives officials as emperor, miniature from the Madrid Skylitzes
- Current region: North-eastern Asia Minor
- Origin: Melitene

The Skleros (Greek: Σκληρός; plural: Σκληροί, Skleroi), latinized Sclerus, feminine form Skleraina (Σκλήραινα), Latinized Scleraena, was a noble Byzantine family active mostly in the 9th–11th centuries as members of the military aristocracy, and as civil functionaries thereafter.

== Origin and early members ==
Byzantine Asia Minor and the Arab–Byzantine frontier zone in the middle of the 9th century

The family descended from north-eastern Asia Minor, either from Lesser Armenia or the theme of Sebasteia. Due to their place of origin, they have been traditionally regarded as Armenians, although this is nowhere explicitly attested. It has also been suggested that the family was mixed Greek–Armenian. However, the evidence for the family's alleged Armenian origins is tenuous. The Greek surname Skleros (lit. 'hard/severe') indicates that the family's founding father may have been at least partly Greek, since Byzantines of Armenian origin generally had surnames that were recognizably Armenian with simply a Greek suffix.

The Skleros have been linked more specifically with the area around Melitene, where a member of the family was active in the 840s, and where the rebellions of Bardas Skleros in the 970s and 980s were centred. After that, they seem to have moved their base to the Anatolic Theme, where they are recorded to have had large estates in the 11th century.

Although the family belonged to the Anatolian military aristocracy, in the 9th century its members are mostly attested as being active in the Balkans: the first Skleros known was a strategos of the Peloponnese in 805, and in 811, the same office was occupied by Leo Skleros, possibly a son or nephew of the former. Another unnamed member of the family is recorded in the 840s as serving the Arabs and being in conflict with Umar al-Aqta, the emir of Malatya, possibly indicating a fall from favour of the family under the Amorian dynasty. The family seems to have regained a prominent position under Basil I the Macedonian (r. 867–886), for the magistros and anthypatos Theodore Skleros is recorded in 869–870. His sons Antony and Niketas became patrikioi, with Antony serving as strategos of Hellas and Niketas possibly as admiral of the imperial fleet (droungarios tou ploimou), while he is also recorded as leading an embassy to the Magyars in 894.

The Skleroi fell into obscurity during the reign of Leo VI the Wise (r. 886–912), who favoured the Doukas and Phokas families. In turn, the Skleroi seem to have supported the usurpation of Romanos Lekapenos: the general Pantherios, who has been tentatively identified as a member of the Skleros clan, became strategos of Lykandos, of the Thracesian Theme and finally domestikos ton scholon for a short time in 944–945, before being replaced by Bardas Phokas the Elder after the downfall of the Lekapenoi from power.

== Bardas Skleros and the family's apex ==
The most distinguished scion of the family, Bardas Skleros, first appears in 956 as a patrikios and strategos of the small frontier theme of Kaloudia. Bardas's siblings married into the most prominent families of the military aristocracy: Constantine Skleros (c. 920–989) married Sophia Phokaina, the niece of Nikephoros II Phokas (r. 963–969), while Maria Skleraina married Nikephoros Phokas's nephew, John I Tzimiskes. The latter connection was of particular importance for the family's fortunes: although she died before Tzimiskes ascended the throne in 969, the Skleroi were promoted by him to senior positions in the state. Bardas was appointed as domestikos ton scholon of the East, suppressing the revolt of the Phokas clan led by Bardas Phokas the Younger, and defeating the Rus' in 970. Despite a period of disgrace in 972–974, connected with a reported conspiracy against Tzimiskes, the Skleroi remained among the most important families during his reign. In 972, Tzimiskes even married Constantine Skleros's daughter, Theophano, to the Holy Roman Emperor Otto II (r. 973–983).

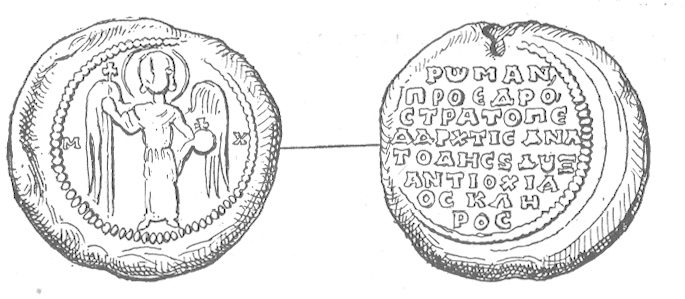
Seal of Romanos Skleros, with the titles of proedros, stratopedarches of the East, and doux of Antioch

The death of Tzimiskes in 976 saw yet another change in the family's standing: the powerful parakoimomenos, Basil Lekapenos, who assumed the tutelage of the young emperor Basil II (r. 976–1025), regarded Bardas Skleros as a threat to the new regime, and demoted him to doux of Mesopotamia. As a result, Bardas rose in rebellion in spring 976, but was defeated by an imperial army under Bardas Phokas the Younger in 979 and forced to seek refuge in the Abbasid Caliphate along with his brother, Constantine, and son, Romanos. In 987, the Skleroi returned to Byzantium, and launched a new bid for the throne. This time Bardas Skleros allied himself with Phokas against Basil II, but was betrayed and imprisoned by Phokas, and was released only after the latter's defeat and death. Skleros renewed his resistance against Basil II for a few months, but eventually was reconciled with the emperor, honoured with the title of kouropalates and allowed to retire with his brother to Didymoteichon. The fate of his son Romanos Skleros is unclear: he remained in active military service, and W. Seibt suggested that he served as doux of Antioch, but the post was occupied at the time by Michael Bourtzes. According to J.-C. Cheynet, Romanos may have been either Bourtzes' deputy or even a stratopedarches or domestikos ton scholon.

== Rise and decline in the 11th century ==
Unlike their erstwhile rivals, the Phokades, the Skleroi managed to survive and retain high offices under Basil II and his successors. Basil Skleros, a son of Romanos, is attested as a patrikios under Constantine VIII (r. 1025–1028), when he was exiled and partially blinded, but was rehabilitated under Romanos III Argyros (r. 1028–1034), whose sister Pulcheria he had married. He became magistros and strategos of the Anatolic Theme, before being exiled again ca. 1032/33.

Basil Skleros and Pulcheria Argyropoulina had a daughter, who became the second wife of Constantine Monomachos, later in life Emperor Constantine IX (r. 1042–1055). Under Monomachos' rule, two other Skleroi, Romanos and Maria, possibly the children of a brother of Basil's appear and gain prominence. Maria Skleraina became Constantine IX's mistress, while her brother advanced from strategos of the Thracesian Theme to the supreme rank of proedros and the post of doux of Antioch. His rivalry with George Maniakes contributed to the latter's rebellion, and he was one of the main supporters of the successful revolt of Isaac I Komnenos (r. 1057–1059). He may have even been promoted to Domestic of the Schools under Isaac or his successor, Constantine X Doukas (r. 1059–1068).

The family declined in importance thereafter, and most of the late 11th-century Skleroi were civil officials rather than military leaders. Among the most important of these are: the protonobelissimos and logothetes tou dromou Andronikos Skleros; the protoproedros and kouropalates Nicholas, who served as Grand Drungary of the Watch; the protoproedros and kouropalates Michael, exisotes and civil judge of Macedonia and Thrace; and the magistros Leo Skleros, civil governor of the Anatolic and Opsician themes and chartoularios tou vestiariou.

== Skleroi of the 12th–14th centuries ==
The Skleroi did not intermarry with the new Komnenian dynasty (1081–1185), and hence fell out of power. From the 12th century, members of the Skleros family appear only rarely in the sources: a certain Seth Skleros was blinded 1166/67 for practising magic; a Romanos Skleros, who lived at the turn of the 13th century and probably held large estates; a sebastos Skleros, landholder at Serres in 1336; and a Demetrios Skleros, official of the metropolis of Zichnoi (near Serres) in 1362.

== Sources ==
- Cheynet, Jean-Claude (1990). Pouvoir et Contestations à Byzance (963–1210) (in French). Paris: Publications de la Sorbonne. ISBN 978-2-85944-168-5.
- Davids, Adelbert (2002). The Empress Theophano: Byzantium and the West at the Turn of the First Millennium. Cambridge: Cambridge University Press. ISBN 0-521-52467-9.
- Kazhdan, Alexander (1991). "Skleros". In Kazhdan, Alexander (ed.). The Oxford Dictionary of Byzantium. Oxford and New York: Oxford University Press. pp. 1911–1912. ISBN 0-19-504652-8.
- Stouraitis, Ioannis (10 October 2003). Σκληροί. Encyclopaedia of the Hellenic World, Asia Minor (in Greek). Athens: Foundation of the Hellenic World.
- Treadgold, Warren (1997). A History of the Byzantine State and Society. Stanford, California: Stanford University Press. ISBN 0-8047-2630-2.
- Whittow, Mark (1996). The Making of Byzantium, 600–1025. Berkeley and Los Angeles, California: University of California Press. ISBN 978-0-520-20496-6.
