= Constantine Komnenos Angelos =

Byzantine aristocrat and military commander

- Sebastokrator of the Byzantine Empire
- Born: c. 1151; Constantinople (modern-day Istanbul, Turkey)
- Died: after 1199; Constantinople
- Noble family: Angelos
- Spouse: name unknown
- Issue: at least one son, name unknown
- Father: Andronikos Doukas Angelos
- Mother: Euphrosyne Kastamonitissa

Constantine Komnenos Angelos (Greek: Κωνσταντῖνος Κομνηνός Ἄγγελος; c. 1151 – after 1199) was a Byzantine aristocrat and military commander, and the older brother of the emperors Isaac II Angelos and Alexios III Angelos. He was blinded by the usurper Andronikos I Komnenos, and raised to sebastokrator by his brother Isaac upon the latter's accession to the throne in 1185.

== Early life and career ==
Constantine Komnenos Angelos was born c. 1151, the eldest son of Andronikos Doukas Angelos and Euphrosyne Kastamonitissa. He was related to the ruling Komnenian dynasty through his paternal grandparents, Constantine Angelos and his wife, Theodora Komnene, daughter of Emperor Alexios I Komnenos (r. 1081–1118). In c. 1169/70 he married, but the name or family of his wife is unknown. He must have had at least one son, whose name and life are unknown apart from his candidacy as heir apparent in 1199 (see below).

According to the court poet and megas droungarios tes vigles (senior judicial official) Gregory Antiochos, Constantine served in the wars against the Seljuk Turks of the Sultanate of Iconium, an activity that must be placed in the last years of Manuel I Komnenos (r. 1143–1180) or during the reign of Alexios II Komnenos (r. 1180–1183).

== Support and opposition to Andronikos I Komnenos ==
In spring 1182, Empress-regent Maria of Antioch and her chief minister, Alexios Komnenos, sent Constantine's father to confront another imperial relative, Andronikos Komnenos, who had rebelled and was marching on Constantinople. Constantine's father had reached the vicinity of Nicomedia, where many local people joined him. In a battle near Charax, Andronikos was defeated by the rebel's army even though that army was a hastily assembled force consisting only, according to Choniates, of "farmers unfit for warfare and a contingent of Paphlagonian soldiers", led not even by an experienced commander but by "a certain eunuch". On his return to Constantinople, Constantine's father was faced with accusations that he had misappropriated money meant for the army's salary. Fearing accusations of pro-rebel sentiments, at the advice of his six sons, "all young in heart and brave in deed" according to Choniates, he barricaded himself and his family in their walled palace at Exokionion, before fleeing the city altogether with his family and joining Andronikos Komnenos in Bithynia. Emboldened by this defection, Andronikos Komnenos moved to Chalcedon, across the Bosporus from Constantinople. Following the defection of the megas doux (commander-in-chief of the Byzantine navy) Andronikos Kontostephanos with the navy to the rebel, a revolt broke out in the city and the gates were opened to Andronikos Komnenos, who now became regent of the underage Alexios II.

Soon, however, the very same nobles who had aided Andronikos Komnenos in rising to power conspired against him, once it became clear that he did not intend to restore them to the privileged positions they had held under Emperor Manuel, and that he contemplated seizing the throne for himself. Like his brothers, Constantine participated in a conspiracy against Andronikos Komnenos, led by his father, Andronikos Kontostephanos, and the logothetes tou dromou (chief minister) Basil Doukas Kamateros. The conspiracy was quickly discovered by the Emperor's agents, however. Kamateros, Kontostephanos and four of his sons, as well as many other members of the conspiracy, were seized and blinded, but Andronikos Angelos and his sons escaped. According to Choniates, while fleeing from the pursuing imperial soldiers, Andronikos and his sons found a boat laden with empty amphorae; throwing the cargo overboard, they boarded it and sailed to safety in Acre. Constantine quickly grew tired of exile, and returned to Constantinople, making his peace with Andronikos Komnenos. Soon after his arrival, however, Andronikos Komnenos moved decisively to usurp power, by killing first the Empress-mother Maria of Antioch (August 1183), followed by his own elevation to co-emperor (September 1183), and finally the murder of Alexios II (October 1183), which left Andronikos Komnenos as sole emperor. Seeing these events, Constantine's younger brothers Theodore and Isaac launched revolts in Prussa and Nicaea respectively. Probably as a result of these, or due to his participation in some conspiracy, Constantine was blinded by the emperor's agents.

== Later life and death ==
Following the rise of his brother Isaac II Angelos (r. 1185–1195, 1203–1204) to the throne in September 1185, Constantine received the high rank of sebastokrator. He apparently played some role in court—Antiochos' laudatory poem was sent to Constantine in hopes of securing a significant official appointment—but according to Antiochos most of his time until the end of his life was devoted to charity.

His reaction to the overthrow of Isaac II in 1195 by his own brother, Alexios III Angelos (r. 1195–1203), is unknown. In spring 1199, however, when Alexios fell ill with gout and the issue of his succession arose (Alexios had no son, only daughters), Constantine was among the imperial relatives who ardently competed with one another, either for themselves, or for their sons—since Constantine and his other two brothers were blinded, they were barred from the imperial office—even though they all were, according to Choniates, insignificant personages. Constantine's subsequent life and date of death are unknown. At some point, he dedicated a rich altar-cloth depicting the archangels, which was looted by the Fourth Crusade and was brought to the Basilica of St. Mark in Venice. A seal of his, with his dignity of sebastokrator, survives in Harvard University's Fogg Art Museum.

== Sources ==
- Brand, Charles M. (1968). Byzantium Confronts the West, 1180–1204. Cambridge, Massachusetts: Harvard University Press. LCCN 67-20872.
- Magoulias, Harry J., ed. (1984). O City of Byzantium: Annals of Niketas Choniatēs. Detroit: Wayne State University Press. ISBN 978-0-8143-1764-8.
- Polemis, Demetrios I. (1968). The Doukai: A Contribution to Byzantine Prosopography. London: The Athlone Press.
- Varzos, Konstantinos (1984). Η Γενεαλογία των Κομνηνών [The Genealogy of the Komnenoi] (PDF) (in Greek). Vol. B. Thessaloniki: Centre for Byzantine Studies, University of Thessaloniki.
