= Constantine Keroularios =

11th-century Byzantine official

Constantine Keroularios (Greek: Κωνσταντῖνος Κηρουλάριος) was a high-ranking Byzantine official in the third quarter of the 11th century. A nephew of Patriarch Michael Keroularios, he was a prominent supporter of Isaac I Komnenos and held a series of senior court, fiscal, and judicial posts.

== Life ==
Constantine was a nephew of the powerful Michael Keroularios, Patriarch of Constantinople in 1043–1059. The name of his father is unknown. A friend and correspondent of Michael Psellos, Constantine and his brother Nikephoros were among the supporters of Isaac I Komnenos when he rose in revolt to seize the throne in 1057, and went on to occupy senior offices in the Byzantine hierarchy. In his correspondence with Psellos, Constantine is variously referred to by the high court ranks of sebastos, proedros, protoproedros, and magistros, the senior fiscal offices of sakellarios and genikos logothetes, and the judicial offices of epi ton kriseon and droungarios tes viglas. It was probably under Constantine's tenure that the latter office acquired the epithet "megas" ("grand"), and was confirmed as the Empire's senior-most judicial authority. Constantine was apparently also the first person to hold the title of sebastos. A seal which may be attributable to him further records the titles of "vestarches, judge of the Velum, and grand curator of the Mangana".

Constantine was also a cousin of Eudokia Makrembolitissa, who married Isaac's lieutenant and successor as emperor, Constantine X Doukas, as she too is referred to as a niece of the patriarch. In 1067, Constantine X was dying. Eudokia, as empress-dowager and mother of Constantine's under-age sons, would lead the regency, but Constantine X feared that she might well include her relatives, who already held high posts in court, in the regency, thus posing a potential threat to the succession of Constantine X's own children. He therefore had Eudokia swear publicly that she would not remarry nor appoint any co-regents over her under-age sons with Constantine other than the latter's brother John Doukas, an oath that she would soon break, however, with her marriage to Romanos IV Diogenes.

Constantine Keroularios died sometime under Nikephoros III Botaneiates (ruled 1078–1081), as his will was the subject of an investigation at this time.

== Family ==
According to genealogy of the 12th-century writer John Tzetzes, Constantine Keroularios married a Georgian lady, a relative of the empress Maria of Alania. The couple had a daughter, who was eventually adopted by Eudokia Makrembolitissa. She married a tax official named George, and gave birth to Tzetzes' own mother. Constantine had also several sons, of whom Michael Keroularios was the most prominent: he likewise became megas droungarios tes viglas and married into the Komnenos dynasty, but defrauded his other brothers of their father's inheritance.

== Sources ==
- Dennis, George T. (2003). "Elias the Monk, Friend of Psellos". In Nesbitt, John William (ed.). Byzantine Authors: Literary Activities and Preoccupations; Texts and Translations Dedicated to the Memory of Nicholas Oikonomides. Leiden: BRILL. pp. 43–64. ISBN 90-04-12975-8.
- Garland, Lynda (1999). Byzantine Empresses: Women and Power in Byzantium, AD 527-1204. London: Routledge. ISBN 978-0-415-14688-3.
- Guilland, Rodolphe (1967). "Le Drongaire et le Grand drongaire de la Veille". Recherches sur les institutions byzantines [Studies on the Byzantine Institutions]. Berliner byzantinische Arbeiten 35 (in French). Vol. 1. Berlin and Amsterdam: Akademie-Verlag & Adolf M. Hakkert. pp. 563–587. OCLC 878894516.
- Kaldellis, Anthony (2007). Hellenism in Byzantium: The Transformations of Greek Identity and the Reception of the Classical Tradition. Cambridge: Cambridge University Press. ISBN 978-0521876889.
- Kazhdan, Alexander (1991). "Keroularios". In Kazhdan, Alexander (ed.). The Oxford Dictionary of Byzantium. Oxford and New York: Oxford University Press. pp. 1124–1125. ISBN 0-19-504652-8.
- Magdalino, Paul (2002) [1993]. The Empire of Manuel I Komnenos, 1143–1180 (Second ed.). Cambridge: Cambridge University Press. ISBN 9780521526531.
- Magdalino, Paul (1994). "Justice and Finance in the Byzantine State, Ninth to Twelfth Centuries". In Laiou, Angeliki E.; Simon, Dieter (eds.). Law and Society in Byzantium, 9th–12th Centuries. Dumbarton Oaks. pp. 93–116. ISBN 978-0-88402-222-0.
- McGeer, Eric; Nesbitt, John; Oikonomides, Nicolas, eds. (2005). Catalogue of Byzantine Seals at Dumbarton Oaks and in the Fogg Museum of Art, Volume 5: The East (continued), Constantinople and Environs, Unknown Locations, Addenda, Uncertain Readings. Vol. 5. Washington, DC: Dumbarton Oaks Research Library and Collection. ISBN 0-88402-309-5.
