= John Tzetzes =

Byzantine poet and scholar (c. 1110 – c. 1180)

- Ἰωάννης Τζέτζης
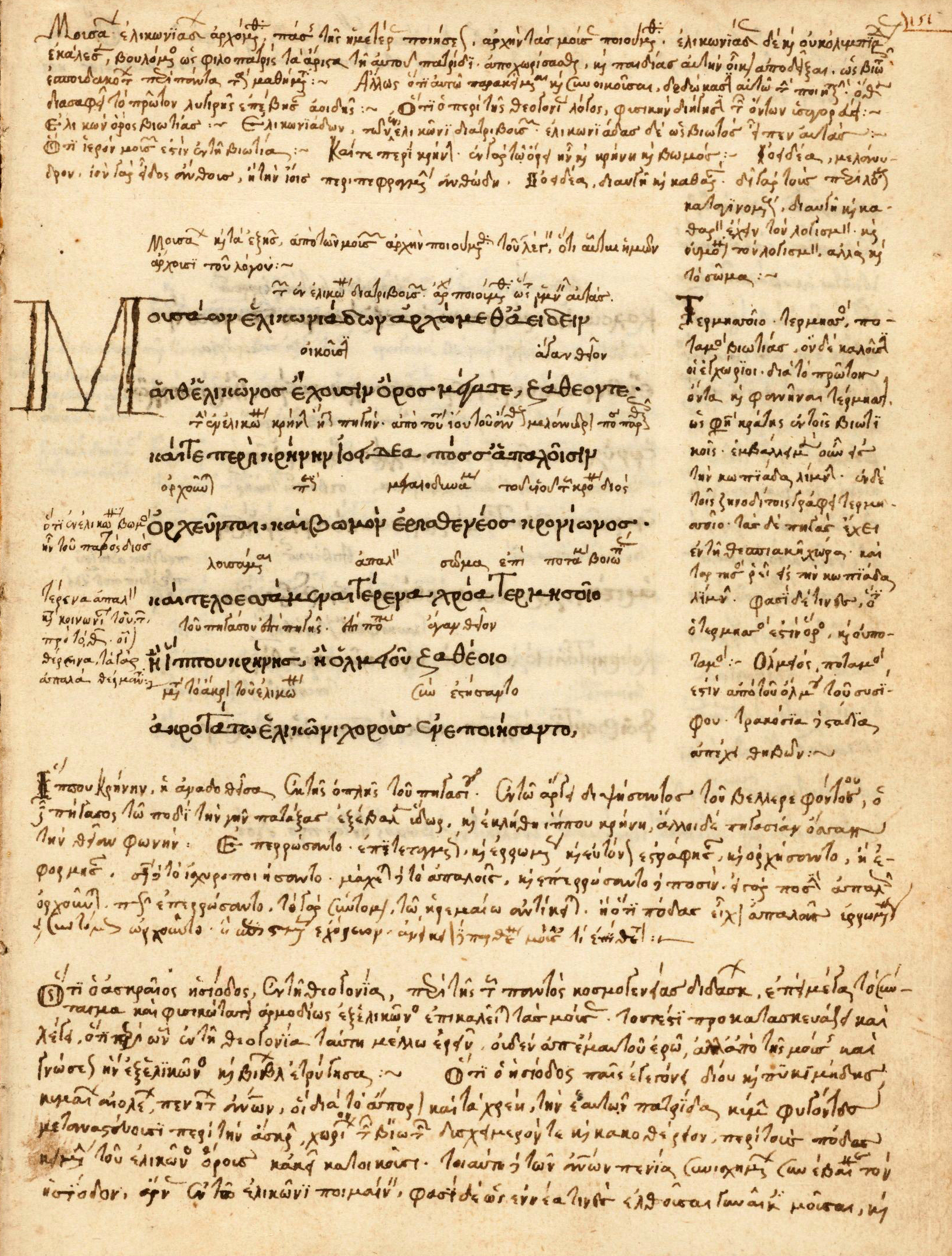
- Greek manuscript of Hesiod's Theogony with commentaries added by John Tzetzes, 16th century copy.
- Born: c. 1100
- Died: c. 1180; Constantinople, Byzantine Empire
- Occupations: Poet, grammarian

John Tzetzes (Greek: Ἰωάννης Τζέτζης, romanized: Iōánnēs Tzétzēs; (Note: Greek pronunciation: [ioˈanis ˈd͡ze.d͡zis]) c. 1110 – c. 1180) was a Byzantine poet and grammarian who lived at Constantinople in the 12th century. He is known for making significant contributions in preserving much valuable information from ancient Greek literature and scholarship. Of his numerous works, the most important one is the Book of Histories, also known as Chiliades ('Thousands'). The work is a long poem containing knowledge that is unavailable elsewhere and serves as commentary on Tzetzes's own letters. Two of his other important works are the Allegoriai on the Iliad and the Odyssey, which are long didactic poems containing interpretations of Homeric theology.

== Biography ==
Tzetzes described himself as pure Greek on his father's side and part Iberian (Georgian) on his mother's side. In his works, Tzetzes states that his grandmother was a relative of the Georgian Bagratid princess Maria of Alania who came to Constantinople with her and later became the second wife of the sebastos Constantine Keroularios, megas droungarios and nephew of the patriarch Michael Keroularios.

He worked as a secretary to a provincial governor for a time and later began to earn a living by teaching and writing. He was described as vain, seems to have resented any attempt at rivalry, and violently attacked his fellow grammarians. Owing to a lack of written material, he was obliged to trust to his memory; therefore caution has to be exercised in reading his work. However, he was learned, and made a great contribution to the furtherance of the study of ancient Greek literature.

== Writings ==
Tzetzes published a collection of 107 of his Letters addressed partly to fictitious/unidentified personages, and partly to influential men and women of the writer's time. They contain a considerable amount of social and biographical information, and are full of learned allusions to history, rhetoric, and mythology.

These letters became the springboard for what became during the Renaissance perhaps the most influential of his many works, the Book of Histories, usually called Chiliades ("thousands") from the arbitrary division by its first editor (N. Gerbel, 1546) into books each containing 1,000 lines. The work consists of 12,674 lines of political verse, divided into 660 topics, each of which is a gloss on a literary, historical, or other learned reference in one of his published letters. The first 141 histories serve as poetic footnotes to a verse letter Tzetzes addressed to John Lachanas, an official in Constantinople.

This collection of literary, historical, theological, and antiquarian miscellanies provides an important snapshot of the intellectual world of Constantinople in the mid-12th century, and also preserves fragments of more than 200 ancient authors, including many whose works have been lost. The author subsequently brought out a revised edition with marginal notes in prose and verse (ed. T. Kiessling, 1826; on the sources see C. Harder, De J. T. historiarum fontibus quaestiones selectae, diss., Kiel, 1886).

Tzetzes wrote Carmina Iliaca, a 1,676-verse poem in dactylic hexameter which summarized the whole story of the Trojan War. The poem is divided into three parts: Antehomerica, which narrates the events taking place before Homer's Iliad, Homerica, summarizing the events of the Iliad, and Posthomerica, reporting the events taking place after the Iliad.

The Homeric Allegories, in "political" verse and dedicated initially to the German-born empress Irene and then to Constantine Cotertzes, are two didactic poems, the first based on the Iliad and the second based on the Odyssey, in which Homer and the Homeric theology are set forth and then explained by means of three kinds of allegory: euhemeristic (πρακτική), anagogic (ψυχική) and physic (στοιχειακή). These works were translated into English in 2015 and 2019 by Adam J. Goldwyn and Dimitra Kokkini.

Tzetzes also wrote commentaries on a number of Greek authors, the most important of which is that elucidating the obscure Cassandra or Alexandra of the Hellenistic poet Lycophron, usually called "On Lycophron" (edited by K. O. Müller, 1811), in the production of which his brother Isaac is generally associated with him. Mention may also be made of a dramatic sketch in iambic verse, in which the caprices of fortune and the wretched lot of the learned are described; and of an iambic poem on the death of the emperor Manuel I Komnenos, noticeable for introducing at the beginning of each line the last word of the line preceding it (both in Pietro Matranga, Anecdota Graeca 1850).

For the other works of Tzetzes see J. A. Fabricius, Bibliotheca graeca (ed. Harles), xi.228, and Karl Krumbacher, Geschichte der byz. Litt. (2nd edition, 1897); monograph by G. Hart, "De Tzetzarum nomine, vitis, scriptis," in Jahn's Jahrbucher für classische Philologie. Supplementband xii (Leipzig, 1881).
