= Neilos Doxapatres =

Byzantine Greek monk, theologian, and writer

Neilos Doxapatres (Greek: Νεῖλος ὁ Δοξοπατρῆς) was a Byzantine Greek monk, theologian, and writer active in Constantinople and Sicily during the first half of the 12th century.

== Biography ==
Born into a native Greek family of Constantinople, he made his career there, where he held various ecclesiastical and secular high offices; deacon of the Hagia Sophia, patriarchal notary, protoproedros of the protosynkelloi and nomophylax. At some point he became a monk, assuming the monastic name "Neilos", and left for Sicily. According to the prologue of Neilos' work on the patriarchs, he was in Palermo in 1142/43, at the court of king Roger II of Sicily. His signature appears at the bottom of an act, dated 1146, regarding the church of the Martorana in Palermo.

Neilos Doxapatres shares a surname with John Doxapatres, a professor of rhetoric who taught in Constantinople in the eleventh century, but their relationship is unknown.

== Works ==
Two works by Doxapatres have survived:

- Treatise on the five patriarchs (Σύγγραμμα... περὶ τῶν πέντε πατριαρχικῶν θρόνων καὶ τῶν ὑπ'αὐτοὺς ἀρχιεπισκόπων καὶ μητροπόλεων κτλ. or Τάξις τῶν πατριαρχικῶν θρόνων), a work of geography and ecclesiastical history commissioned by King Roger II of Sicily. In it, Doxapatres explores Orthodox ideas of the Universal Church, which were far removed from those of the papacy (as well as the other Greek theologians active in southern Italy). As a result, the work was very controversial in the West, and only two manuscript copies survive before 1453, but which were translated into Armenian around 1179/80. The first printed edition appeared in Étienne Le Moine's collection Varia Sacra, seu Sylloge variorum opusculorum Græcorum ad rem ecclesiasticam spectantium, 2 vols. (Leiden, 1685).
- A Useful Inquiry into the Divine Economy in Relationship to Man (Περὶ τῆς ἐξ ἀρχῆς καὶ μέχρι τέλους οἰκονομίας τοῦ Θεοῦ εἰς τὸν ἄνθρωπον ἱστορία ἐπωφελής, καὶ περὶ τῆς χριστιανικῆς πολιτείας ὅπως συνέστη, καὶ κατὰ πάντων τῶν αἱρετικῶν), a vast theological summa apparently conceived of in five books, of which only the first two have survived——although we don't know whether the other three were ever, in fact, written. The first book discusses, in 263 chapters, the creation of man, Paradise, and the Fall; the second devoted 203 chapters to Christ, the second Adam, who repairs the sins for the first and saves humanity through his Incarnation and Passion. Book I was inspired above all by Gregory of Nyssa's On the creation of man and Nemesius's On the nature of man, Book II by the commentaries of Theophylact of Ohrid. Books III and IV, based on their titles, were probably meant to discuss the later history of the apostles and the Church.

The Synopsis Canonum written by Alexios Aristenos was falsely attributed to him.

== Editions of texts ==
- Patrologia Graeca 132, col. 1083-1114 (Traité sur les patriarcats) and col. 1292–96. First chapter and final paragraph of Book 1 of De Œconomia Dei, based on a publication by Angelo Mai.
- Finck, Franz Nikolaus, ed. Des Nilos Doxopatres Τάξις τῶν πατριαρχικῶν θρόνων. Vagharshabad (Etchmiadzine), Mayr Athorho, 1902. Greek and Armenian versions.

== Bibliography ==
- Caruso, Stefano. "Echi della polemica bizantina antilatina dell'XI-XII sec. nel De Œconomia Dei di Nilo Doxapatres." In Atti del Congresso internazionale di studi sulla Sicilia normanna, 403–31. Palermo, 1973.
- Morton, James. "A Byzantine Canon Law Scholar in Norman Sicily: Revisiting Neilos Doxapatres's Order of the Patriarchal Thrones." Speculum 92.3 (2017): 724–54.
- Neyrinck, Stefaan. "The De Œconomia Dei by Nilus Doxapatres. Some Introductory Remarks to the Work and its Edition & Chapter I, 40 : Edition, Translation and Commentary," Byzantion 80 (2010): 265–305.
- P. Van Deun, "Lire les Pères grecs en Sicile normande : le cas du De oeconomia Dei de Nil Doxapatrès", dans B. Cabouret, A. Peters-Custot et C. Rouxpetel (éd), La réception des Pères grecs et orientaux en Italie au Moyen Âge (Ve-XVe siècle), Paris 2020, p. 161‑179.
