= Maria Skleraina =

Mistress and adviser to Constantine IX Monomachos

- Sebaste
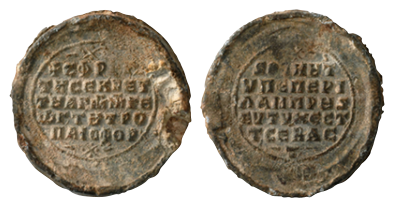
- Seal of the sekreton of Maria's household with the inscription: "Seal of the sekreton of the holy and great martyr George the Tropaiophoros / and of the house of the must illustrious and most fortunate sebaste"
- Died: c. 1045
- Burial: Monastery of Saint George, Mangana
- Partner: Constantine IX Monomachos (1032–c.1045)
- House: Skleros

Maria Skleraina (Greek: Μαρία Σκλήραινα; died c. 1045 CE), often referred to as the Skleraina, was the political adviser, official mistress, and potentially wife of the Byzantine Emperor Constantine IX Monomachos. He controversially gave her the title of Sebastē.

Of the prominent Skleros family, she was known for her charming appearance and character, and was possibly married to Constantine IX prior to his succession to the throne, but the marriage was not considered legal by the church. Constantine became emperor in 1042 by his marriage to empress Zoë Porphyrogenita, who - being 20 years older than him, and marrying him for purposes of securing succession rather than childbearing - accepted his continued relationship with Maria Skleraina. Skleraina was not acknowledged as Constantine's wife but stayed at court officially as his mistress.

She played an important role at court, acting as the political adviser of Constantine IX and benefitting the career of her brother Romanos Skleros. She was unpopular with the public. In March 1044, a riot broke out in Constantinople because the public feared that Constantine was planning to kill Zoe in order to marry Skleraina.
