= Basil Skleros =

Basil Skleros (Greek: Βασίλειος Σκληρός) was a Byzantine aristocrat and provincial governor in the early 11th century.

Basil was the son of the magistros Romanos Skleros, a son of the rebel general Bardas Skleros who became a close advisor to Emperor Basil II (r. 976–1025).

He married with Pulcheria, a sister of the future emperor Romanos III Argyros (r. 1028–1034). The couple had a daughter, who already during the reign of Basil II married another future emperor, Constantine IX Monomachos (r. 1042–1055).

Basil himself is first mentioned during the reign of Constantine VIII (r. 1025–1028), when he held the rank of patrikios. During this time, he came into conflict with Presian, the governor of the Bucellarian Theme, that escalated to the point that they exchanged blows. Emperor Constantine banished both men to the Princes' Islands: one of them to the island of Plate, the other to Oxeia. Skleros was accused of planning to flee, and was blinded as a result; according to John Skylitzes, Presian narrowly escaped the same fate himself, but was released instead.

When Romanos III came to the throne, however, Basil was rehabilitated and promoted to magistros. According to one view, he was further promoted to vestes and given the post of strategos of the Anatolic Theme. At some point, he also appears to have conspired against his brother-in-law, as both he and his wife were banished from Constantinople by Romanos.

The arrogance of Basil Skleros and his relatives, who ruled their estates almost as independent lords, is severely criticized in the Peira of the contemporary legal scholar Eustathios Rhomaios.

== Sources ==
- Kazhdan, Alexander, ed. (1991). The Oxford Dictionary of Byzantium. Oxford and New York: Oxford University Press. ISBN 0-19-504652-8.
- Lilie, Ralph-Johannes; Ludwig, Claudia; Pratsch, Thomas; Zielke, Beate (2013). Prosopographie der mittelbyzantinischen Zeit Online. Berlin-Brandenburgische Akademie der Wissenschaften. Nach Vorarbeiten F. Winkelmanns erstellt (in German). Berlin and Boston: De Gruyter.
- Stouraitis, Ioannis (10 October 2003). Σκληροί. Encyclopaedia of the Hellenic World, Asia Minor (in Greek). Athens: Foundation of the Hellenic World.
