= Gregory Antiochos =

12th-century Byzantine official

Gregory Antiochos (Greek: Γρηγόριος Ἀντίοχος, romanized: Grēgorios Antiochos) was a 12th-century Byzantine official and author.

== Life and career ==
Gregory Antiochos was born in Constantinople, the capital of the Byzantine Empire, some time around 1125. He hailed from a family that is known to have lived in the city since the 11th century. His father Paulos Antiochos, who died around 1177, founded a small female convent at the Forum Bovis. Antiochos was apparently not an only child, but had no brothers. He received an excellent education under Nicholas Kataphloron (whose funeral oration he held in early 1160), Nicholas Hagiotheodorites, and Eustathius of Thessalonica. His first known work can be dated to the years after 1157, his last work was written around 1199. He entered the civil service early in his life, soon becoming a member of the central imperial bureaucracy.

Before 1175 Antiochos was judge of the velon, and was sufficiently prominent to hold the funeral oration of Emperor Manuel I Komnenos (r. 1143–1180) on 22 January 1181. His career under the subsequent regency and the regime of Andronikos I Komnenos (r. 1183–1185) is unknown, but modern scholarship considers it plausible that he had to resign under Andronikos, rejoined the civil service under Isaac II Angelos (r. 1185–1195, 1203–1204) but finally had to resign because of his weak health. In 1196 he is mentioned again in a document of the monastery of Great Lavra as megas droungarios tes vigles, with the rank of protonobelissimohypertatos. His subsequent fate, and the date of his death, are unknown. He had numerous children, of whom the oldest became a monk.

== Works ==
Antiochos left a varied corpus of letters, speeches, eulogies and epitaphs, which are an important source for contemporary Byzantine history. In his work, he appears "a defender not only of imperial omnipotence, but also of the senate; he favored 'democratic' phraseology but stood aloof from military commanders". In his works, he "gives life to books and fruits, and endows animals with reason".

== Sources ==
- Guilland, Rodolphe (1967). "Le Drongaire et le Grand drongaire de la Veille". Recherches sur les institutions byzantines, Tome I (in French). Berlin: Akademie Verlag. pp. 563–587.
- Kazhdan, Alexander (1991). "Antiochos, Gregory". In Kazhdan, Alexander (ed.). The Oxford Dictionary of Byzantium. Oxford and New York: Oxford University Press. p. 119. ISBN 0-19-504652-8.
- Sideras, Alexander (2021). Gregorii Antiochi opera. Orationes et epistulae. Introductione instruxit, edidit et germanice vertit. Gregorius Antiochos, Werke. Reden und Briefe. Eingeleitet, herausgegeben und übersetzt. Corpus Fontium Historiae Byzantinae. Vol. 54. Wien: Verlag der Österreichischen Akademie der Wissenschaften.
