= Hagiotheodorites =

Hagiotheodorites (Greek: Ἀγιοθεοδωρίτης) was the name of a Byzantine family of civil and Church officials active chiefly in the 12th century.

The first two known members of the family are the scholar Constantine Hagiotheodorites, who served at the court of John II Komnenos (r. 1118–1143), and the abbot Nicholas Hagiotheodorites.

Under Manuel I Komnenos (r. 1143–1180), John Hagiotheodorites was for a time the favourite official of the Emperor. Around 1160, the brothers Michael, John and Nicholas also attained prominence; Nicholas served as Metropolitan of Athens in the 1160s and 1170s.

In the 13th century, Konstas Hagiotheodorites served as a minister and private secretary to Theodore II Laskaris (r. 1254–1258). A certain John Hagiotheodorites was a cleric in Constantinople in 1357.

== Sources ==
- Kazhdan, Alexander (1991). "Hagiotheodorites". In Kazhdan, Alexander (ed.). The Oxford Dictionary of Byzantium. Oxford and New York: Oxford University Press. p. 899. ISBN 0-19-504652-8.
- Trapp, Erich; Beyer, Hans-Veit; Walther, Rainer; Sturm-Schnabl, Katja; Kislinger, Ewald; Leontiadis, Ioannis; Kaplaneres, Sokrates (1976–1996). Prosopographisches Lexikon der Palaiologenzeit (in German). Vienna: Verlag der Österreichischen Akademie der Wissenschaften. ISBN 3-7001-3003-1.
