= Nicholas Hagiotheodorites =

Byzantine scholar (died 1775)

Nicholas Hagiotheodorites (Greek: Νικόλαος Ἁγιοθεοδωρίτης, romanized: Nikolaos Hagiotheodōritēs; died 1175) was a Byzantine scholar, official, and Metropolitan of Athens.

The Hagiotheodorites family first appears in the early 12th century, and were all civil and religious functionaries. Nicholas and his two brothers all rose to occupy the highest offices under Manuel I Komnenos (r. 1143–1180): Michael Hagiotheodorites became epi tou kanikleiou, orphanotrophos, and logothetes tou dromou, while John Hagiotheodorites became Eparch of Constantinople and mesazon.

Nicholas Hagiotheodorites served as law teacher (nomophylax) and even held the post of maistor ton rhetoron ("master of the rhetoricians"). He then resided in Athens as its metropolitan bishop from ca. 1160 to his death in 1175. His successor was the scholar Michael Choniates.

== Sources ==
- Kazhdan, Alexander, ed. (1991). The Oxford Dictionary of Byzantium. Oxford and New York: Oxford University Press. ISBN 0-19-504652-8.
- Madariaga, Elisavet (2005). "Ο Ευστάθιος Θεσσαλονίκης και η μονωδία του για τον Νικόλαο Αγιοθεοδωρίτη". Byzantina Symmeikta (in Greek). 17: 199–211. doi:10.12681/byzsym.922.
- Madariaga, Elisavet (2009). "Η βυζαντινή οικογένεια των Αγιοθεοδωριτών (Ι): Νικόλαος Αγιοθεοδωρίτης, Πανιερώτατος Μητροπολίτης Αθηνών και Υπέρτιμος". Byzantina Symmeikta (in Greek). 19: 147–181. doi:10.12681/byzsym.946.
- Magdalino, Paul (2002) [1993]. The Empire of Manuel I Komnenos, 1143–1180 (Second ed.). Cambridge: Cambridge University Press. ISBN 9780521526531.
- Shawcross, Therese (2016). "Golden Athens: Episcopal Wealth and Power in Greece at the Time of the Crusades". In Nikolaos G. Chrissis; Mike Carr (eds.). Contact and Conflict in Frankish Greece and the Aegean, 1204-1453: Crusade, Religion and Trade Between Latins, Greeks and Turks. Routledge. pp. 65–95. ISBN 9781317161059.
