= Nikephoros Proteuon =

Nikephoros Proteuon (Greek: Νικηφόρος ὁ Πρωτεύων; fl. 1055) was a Byzantine governor and was briefly the candidate of a court faction to succeed Emperor Constantine IX Monomachos.

== Biography ==
Nikephoros was the scion of a family attested already in the 10th century. Nikephoros Proteuon served as governor of the theme of Bulgaria during the final years of the reign of Constantine IX Monomachos (r. 1042–1055). The exact title of his office is unknown, as the sources label him simply as "the one holding the rule of Bulgaria" (τὴν τῆς Βουλγαρίας περιεζωσμένος ἀρχήν). Ordinarily this would mean a military governor with the rank of either doux or katepano, but if his identification in the hagiography of Saint Lazaros of Mount Galesios (see below) is correct, he may have been a civil official. This also appears to accord with the fact that he was supported as a candidate for the throne by the civilian faction at court. Most of the previous members of the Proteuon family were military men, however.

As Constantine IX was dying in January 1055, his eunuch courtiers—John Skylitzes names John the logothetes, Constantine the protonotarios of the dromos, and Basil the epi tou kanikleiou as the chief among them—convinced him to choose Nikephoros as his successor to bypass the rights of the empress Theodora, Constantine's former sister-in-law and last living member of the Macedonian dynasty. They sent an urgent summons for Nikephoros to come to Constantinople, but their designs quickly became known to Theodora's supporters. They took the elderly empress from retirement in a monastery, brought her by warship to the Great Palace, and crowned her emperor a few hours before Constantine died "cursing his fate" on January 11. Nikephoros was arrested in Thessalonica and exiled to the Thracesian Theme, where he was tonsured and banished to the monastery of Kouzenas in Magnesia.

Nikephoros Proteuon is commonly identified by modern scholars such as Jean-Claude Cheynet with the "Nikephoros, the son of Proteuon", who appears in chapter 119 of the hagiography of Saint Lazaros of Mount Galesios. According to the hagiography, he was serving as judge (krites) of the Thracesian Theme when he encountered the saint. As used in the hagiography, however, the term "Proteuon" may not refer to a family surname, but to the position of proteuon, or local headsman. He may also be the Nikephoros, son of Euthymios, mentioned in chapters 105 and 106 of the same work, who had been banished by Emperor Constantine IX, but whose recall to imperial service was predicted by the saint.

== Sources ==
- Cheynet, Jean-Claude (1996). Pouvoir et Contestations à Byzance (963–1210) (in French). Paris: Publications de la Sorbonne. ISBN 978-2-85944-168-5.
- Greenfield, Richard P. H., ed. (2000). The Life of Lazaros of Mt. Galesion: An Eleventh-century Pillar Saint. Washington DC: Dumbarton Oaks. ISBN 0884022722.
- Wortley, John, ed. (2010). John Skylitzes: A Synopsis of Byzantine History, 811–1057. Cambridge: Cambridge University Press. ISBN 978-0-521-76705-7.
