= Nomophylax =

The nomophylax (Greek: νομοφύλαξ, "guardian of the laws") was a senior Byzantine judicial office of the 11th–15th centuries.

== History ==
The office of nomophylax was established by Emperor Constantine IX Monomachos (r. 1042–1055) either in 1043, 1045, or 1047 for John Xiphilinos, the future Patriarch of Constantinople. The office held extraordinary authority and was of high distinction: he presided over the law school of the capital, Constantinople, was a member of the Byzantine Senate, held the seat next to the epi ton kriseon, and was accorded an annual salary (roga) of 4 pounds of gold and a silk tunic, not counting various imperial donations and gifts on holidays. The post's authority was further strengthened by precisely specifying the few cases in which an incumbent could be dismissed.

The post did not long survive in its original conception, however, and quickly became associated with ecclesiastical law, enjoying, according to J. Darrouzès, an intermediate position between the civil and ecclesiastical administrations. Thus in the 12th century, it was held by several notable canonists, such as Alexios Aristenos, Neilos Doxapatres, and Theodore Balsamon. In the 14th century, there were both civil and ecclesiastical nomophylakes, with the latter analogous to another ecclesiastical judicial office, the dikaiophylax.

== Sources ==
- Kazhdan, Alexander, ed. (1991). The Oxford Dictionary of Byzantium. New York and Oxford: Oxford University Press. ISBN 978-0-19-504652-6.
