= Alexios Aristenos =

12th-century Byzantine priest and writer

Alexios Aristenos (Greek: Ἀλέξιος Ἀριστηνός) was oikonomos and nomophylax of the Great Church at Constantinople. He flourished around 1166 AD, in which year he was present at the Council of Constantinople. He edited a Synopsis Canonum with scholia, which is given by Bishop Beveridge in his Pandectae Canonum in 1672. Other works by him are quoted.
