= Eustathios Rhomaios =

Byzantine judge and legal writer

Eustathios Rhomaios (Greek: Εὐστάθιος Ῥωμαῖος; fl. ca. 975–1034) was a senior judge and writer on law of the Byzantine Empire.

Rhomaios followed in the footsteps of his grandfather, becoming a judge at the imperial court. Over the course of his career, which began in the reign of Emperor Basil II, he advanced from simple judge (litos krites) to the rank of magistros and the prestigious post of droungarios tes viglas, being perhaps the very first holder of this title as president of the Court of the Hippodrome. He was highly esteemed both during his lifetime and by later legal scholars for his knowledge and skill in decision making. Rhomaios wrote several legal treatises, chiefly comprising statements of verdict, counsel's opinions etc., but most of them have been lost. One of his colleagues, however, selected some parts of his work and, arranging them by subject in 75 titles, published a compendium known as the Peira ("experience"). The Peira was intended as a textbook. It contains "in a loosely associated progression, precepts, definitions, and solutions to problems from all spheres of civil and criminal law" (D. Simon), and its compiler tried to deduce general rules that governed Rhomaios' decisions. The Peira remained a popular book until the late Byzantine period, and was often cited by later Byzantine legal scholars.

== Sources ==
- Simon, Dieter (1991a). "Peira". In Kazhdan, Alexander (ed.). The Oxford Dictionary of Byzantium. New York and Oxford: Oxford University Press. p. 1617. ISBN 978-0-19-504652-6.
- Simon, Dieter (1991b). "Rhomaios, Eustathios". In Kazhdan, Alexander (ed.). The Oxford Dictionary of Byzantium. New York and Oxford: Oxford University Press. p. 1793. ISBN 978-0-19-504652-6.
- Magdalino, Paul (1994). "Justice and Finance in the Byzantine State, Ninth to Twelfth Centuries". In Laiou, Angeliki E.; Simon, Dieter (eds.). Law and society in Byzantium, 9th–12th centuries. Dumbarton Oaks. pp. 93–116. ISBN 978-0-88402-222-0.
