= Droungarios of the Watch =

Senior Byzantine military, and later judicial, post

The Droungarios of the Watch (Medieval Greek: δρουγγάριος τῆς βίγλης/βίγλας, romanized: droungarios tēs viglēs/viglas), sometimes anglicized as Drungary of the Watch, was originally a senior Byzantine military post. Attested since the late 8th century, the droungarios commanded the Vigla or "Watch", one of the elite professional cavalry regiments (tagmata) of the middle Byzantine period, and was in charge of the Byzantine emperor's personal security. From c. 1030, the office was disassociated from its military origin and was transformed into a senior judicial position, thereafter usually referred to as the Grand Droungarios of the Watch (μέγας δρουγγάριος τῆς βίγλης/βίγλας, megas droungarios tēs viglēs/viglas). The office continued to exist as a mostly honorific court dignity in the Palaiologan era, until the very end of the Byzantine Empire in the mid-15th century.

== Military office ==
The Droungarios of the Watch was originally the commander of the Vigla ("guard watch") or Arithmos ("number", meaning "regiment"), the third of the tagmata, professional cavalry regiments headquartered in and around Constantinople, and distinct from the provincial or thematic troops. The title of droungarios itself means "commander of a droungos", a term of Gaulish origin which came to be used as a term for a kind of tactical cavalry formation in the East Roman army of Late Antiquity. The term droungarios (Greek: δρουγγάριος) is not documented before the early 7th century but might have been used as an informal or unofficial designation before that date. The office and the corresponding unit appear to have initially referred to ad hoc arrangements, but during the early 7th century these were formalized, like much of the East Roman army's rank structure.

Judging from the unit's name and the peculiar titles of its officers, it also had a considerable ancestry, dating back to the East Roman army, but it is unknown exactly when it was constituted as a tagma. The office of the Droungarios of the Watch at any rate is first attested c. 791, when Alexios Mosele is recorded as "spatharios and droungarios of the Watch". In contrast to the other tagmata, the Watch and its commanders had special duties related to the safety of the Emperor and the imperial palace. Within Constantinople, the Watch provided guards for the palace precinct, and kept a permanent garrison at the Covered Hippodrome (which was also the droungarios's seat).

As detailed in the De Ceremoniis, the Droungarios of the Watch always accompanied the Emperor and was a frequent participant in various imperial ceremonies, often accompanied by his principal aide, the akolouthos. His ceremonial dress is indicated as the skaramangion tunic and a red sagion cloak, while on some occasions he bore a sword, a mace and an axe. The latter weapon was highly unusual for a Byzantine officer, and the French scholar Rodolphe Guilland suggests that this was connected to his command of foreign troops via the akolouthos (who later notably became the commander of the axe-bearing Varangian Guard). In the 10th century, when several holders of the post were scions of the most prominent families of the military aristocracy, including Eustathios Argyros, John Kourkouas and Manuel Kourtikes, the droungarios occupied the 36th place in the imperial hierarchy and usually held the senior court dignities of anthypatos, patrikios or prōtospatharios.

=== List of known holders ===
Note: the list does not include holders known only through their seals but otherwise unidentified, or anonymous holders.

Name	Tenure	Appointed by	Notes	Refs
Alexios Mosele	c. 791	Irene of Athens	Participated in a revolt against Irene, which ended her regency over Constantine VI, but was imprisoned and blinded soon after.	
Ooryphas	late 820s	Michael II	Appointed admiral and sent to check the depredations of the Cretan Saracens, he instituted a new corps of marines and managed to recover several Aegean islands from the Saracens.	
Petronas	c. 830s	Theophilos	The exact dates of his tenure are unknown. Under Theophilos' son and successor, Michael III, he held several senior military commands and achieved the great victory at the Battle of Lalakaon.	
Aetios	c. 830s	Theophilos	Known as the strategos of the Anatolics who was captured by the Abbasids during the Sack of Amorium in 838 and became one of the 42 Martyrs of Amorium. Some modern scholars identify him with a droungarios of the same name, attested in a 9th/10th century signet ring.	
Constantine Baboutzikos	until 838	Theophilos	A brother-in-law of Empress Theodora, he too was captured at Amorium and became one of the 42 Martyrs of Amorium.	
Ooryphas	early 840s	Theophilos	The exact date of his tenure is unknown, as is his identification with one of the other figures bearing this surname at this time. Kedrenos reports that he was charged with the execution of Theophobos.	
Constantine Maniakes	842–unknown	Michael III	An Armenian who had come to the Byzantine court as a hostage, he served as droungarios in the early years of Michael III's reign, during the regency of Theodora. He later rose to become Logothete of the Drome.	
John Androsalites	867–unknown	Basil I the Macedonian	Brother of the abbot Nicholas, who had sheltered the young Basil on his first arrival to Constantinople, he and his brothers were all given high offices on Basil's accession.	
Leo Katakalon	c. 877	Basil I the Macedonian	Variously named Katakylas, Katakoilas and Katakalos in the sources. According to the hagiography of the Patriarch Ignatios, he was a son-in-law of Ignatios' great rival, Photios, and persecuted with brutality Ignatios' adherents at the start of Photios' second patriarchate (877–886). In 896 promoted to Domestic of the Schools and led the Byzantines in the disastrous Battle of Boulgarophygon.	
John	c. 897	Leo VI the Wise	He was dismissed due to negligence in uncovering a plot against Leo, who appointed Pardos in his stead.	
Pardos	c. 897–898	Leo VI the Wise	The son of the hetaeriarch Nicholas Zaoutzes, he was absolutely trusted by Leo, but was in turn arrested for the failed plot of his brother Basil and the members of the family of Stylianos Zaoutzes.	
John	before 914	Leo VI the Wise	One of the brothers of Patriarch Nicholas Mystikos, he is only known by a letter of his wife from 914/5.	
Eustathios Argyros	c. 908–910	Leo VI the Wise	A distinguished general of aristocratic descent, he was named droungarios in late 908. He too was dismissed and sent to exile in his native Charsianon when he fell under Leo's suspicion. He died of poison en route.	
Damianos	913–unknown	Constantine VII (nominally)	Appointed by Empress-regent Zoe Karbonopsina	
John Kourkouas	c. 918–922	Constantine VII (nominally)	Appointed through the machinations of Romanos Lekapenos, Kourkouas supported the latter in his rise to the throne. In 922 he was rewarded with the high command in the East, which he held for 22 years in which he scored major victories against the Arabs.	
Manuel Kourtikes	944/5–unknown	Constantine VII	Kourtikes was among the conspirators who overthrew Romanos Lekapenos in December 944, leading to the restoration of sole imperial power to Constantine VII a month later. He was named droungarios of the Watch, and died soon after either in a shipwreck or was executed for lèse-majesté.	
Symeon	1025–1028	Constantine VIII	Third chamberlain and one of Constantine VIII's favourite eunuchs, he was named droungarios and proedros on his becoming sole emperor. Symeon later became Domestic of the Schools before retiring as a monk.	

== Judicial office ==
In c. 1030, the office changed from military to purely judicial, and was further distinguished by acquiring the epithet "Grand" (megas) in the 1070s. It seems that the droungarios took over the Court of the Hippodrome, extant since the mid-9th century and so known after its location in the Covered Hippodrome (or, according to an alternative interpretation, in the substructures of the main Hippodrome of Constantinople). This was followed by the creation of new courts and the restructuring of the Byzantine judicial system, so that in the Komnenian period (1081–1185), the Court of the Hippodrome or "Court of the Droungarios" (τὸ δρουγγαρικὸν δικαστήριον, to droungarikon dikastērion) was one of the seven superior civil courts, alongside those of the Eparch of the City, the dikaiodotēs, the koiaistōr, the epi tōn kriseōn, the prōtasēkrētis and the katholikos, who headed the court for fiscal affairs (dēmosiaka pragmata). The droungarios also served as an appellate court for the decisions of the epi tōn kriseōn. The holders of the post belonged to some of the most distinguished families of the civil aristocracy, including such men as Eustathios Rhomaios, John Skylitzes and Andronikos Kamateros.

=== List of known holders ===
Note: the list does not include holders known only through their seals but otherwise unidentified, or anonymous holders.

Name	Tenure	Appointed by	Notes	Refs
Eustathios Rhomaios	shortly after May 1030	Romanos III Argyros	Possibly the very first holder of the office who presided over the Court of the Hippodrome. He was named droungarios some time after May 1030, and before April 1034. The magistros Eustathios Rhomaios is more famous for his collection of fiscal case law, published as the Peira.	
Anastasios	c. 1030s	unknown	Mentioned only in a document of Patriarch Alexios Stoudites (1025–1043).	
Manuel	1054–unknown	Theodora	He was rewarded with the post for having helped Theodora gain supreme power for herself.	
Machetarios	3rd quarter of the 11th century	unknown	A correspondent of Michael Psellos, nothing further is known of him.	
John Xiphilinos	early 1060s	Constantine X Doukas (?)	Patriarch of Constantinople in 1064–1075. According to Theodore Skoutariotes, he was a magistros and droungarios of the Watch prior to his nomination as patriarch.	
Constantine Xiphilinos	c. 1070	Romanos IV Diogenes (?)	Another addressee of Michael Psellos, nothing further is known of him.	
Constantine Keroularios	1060s/1070s	Constantine X Doukas or Michael VII Doukas	A nephew of Patriarch Michael Keroularios and cousin of empress Eudokia Makrembolitissa. He was a very influential figure under the Doukas emperors, and is the first known holder of the title of "Grand Droungarios".	
Stephen	1078–1081	Nikephoros III Botaneiates	He was dismissed after the deposition of Botaneiates and became a monk and abbot of Xenophontos monastery on Mount Athos. Better known as Symeon the Sanctified.	
Michael Keroularios	1081–unknown	Alexios I Komnenos	Son of Constantine Keroularios, an eminent expert on judicial and financial matters; he rose to become logothetes ton sekreton for most of Alexios I's reign.	
John Thrakesios	c. 1092	Alexios I Komnenos	Possibly the same as the proedros, Eparch and Grand Droungarios John who is mentioned in an act variously dated to 1083, 1098 or 1113, but more usually identified with the historian John Skylitzes.	
Nicholas Mermentoulos	c. 1094	Alexios I Komnenos	Attended the Council of Blachernae (1094), later nobilissimus and Eparch of Constantinople.	
John Zonaras	early 12th century	Alexios I Komnenos	Better known as a historian, Zonaras held high court positions under Alexios I before retiring as a monk.	
Niketas or Nicholas Skleros	1084, 1099, or 1114	Alexios I Komnenos	Mentioned only in a law promulgated by Alexios I on a January, on the 7th indiction, i.e. in 1084, 1099, or 1114.	
Constantine Komnenos	c. 1143	John II Komnenos or Manuel I Komnenos	Referred to simply as a "Grand Droungarios", he was probably an admiral (megas droungarios tou ploimou) rather than a Grand Droungarios of the Watch.	
Stephen Komnenos	c. 1147/51–c. 1156	Manuel I Komnenos		
John Makrembolites	c. 1158	Manuel I Komnenos		
Andronikos Kamateros	c. 1166–c. 1170	Manuel I Komnenos	A leading official and distinguished author, Kamateros was related to the imperial family on his mother's side.	
Gregory Antiochos	1187–c. 1196	Isaac II Angelos	A very well-educated man and distinguished author. By the time he was named Grand Droungarios, he had enjoyed a long career in public service stretching back to the 1150s.	

== Palaiologan era ==
Following the sack of Constantinople by the Fourth Crusade in 1204, the office's continuity was broken, and when it reappears in the sources of the Palaiologan period, it had lost any judicial functions and resembled more its original military character: according to the mid-14th century Book of Offices of Pseudo-Kodinos, the Grand Droungarios of the Watch was a subordinate of the Grand Domestic, charged with the night watch and with supervising the army's scouts. In reality, however, it had become more of a sinecure and was essentially a court dignity devoid of any but ceremonial duties.

In Pseudo-Kodinos' work, the Grand Droungarios of the Watch ranks 24th in the imperial hierarchy, between the Eparch and the megas hetaireiarches. The Grand Droungarios's distinctive court dress, as reported by Pseudo-Kodinos, consisted of a gold-brocaded hat (skiadion), a plain silk kabbadion tunic and a staff (dikanikion) with a gilded knob on top, and covered with golden-red braid below. For ceremonies and festivities, he bore the domed skaranikon, of yellow and golden silk and decorated with gold wire embroidery, and with a portrait of the emperor seated on a throne in front and another with the emperor on horseback on the rear.

The dignity survived until the end of the Byzantine Empire. The historian Sphrantzes equated the Ottoman post of Agha of the Janissaries to the Grand Droungarios of the Watch.

=== List of known holders ===
Note: the list does not include holders known only through their seals but otherwise unidentified, or anonymous holders.

Name	Tenure	Appointed by	Notes	Refs
Andronikos Eonopolites	c. 1286–89	Michael VIII Palaiologos	Eunuch and military commander. Michael may have been “the last [Byzantine] emperor to entrust a eunuch with the command of an army."	
Theodore Komnenos Philes	early 14th century	Andronikos II Palaiologos or Andronikos III Palaiologos	He is mentioned in an act variously dated to 1302, 1317 or 1332, as being buried in the Spelaiotissa Monastery at Melenikon	
Demetrios Palaiologos Tornikes	c. 1324–41	Andronikos II Palaiologos; Andronikos III Palaiologos	A relative of the imperial family, he is only mentioned in four documents.	
Constantine Palaiologos Tornikes	c. 1325	Andronikos II Palaiologos	Megas droungarios tēs viglēs at Berroia in 1325.	
Bryennios	1320s	Andronikos II Palaiologos	Otherwise unknown, he defected to Andronikos III Palaiologos during the Byzantine civil war of 1321–1328.	
Nikephoros	after 1325	Andronikos II Palaiologos	Known only from an act of the Zographou monastery of 1342, by which time he was dead.	
Kannaboutzes (?)	1324	Andronikos II Palaiologos	A droungarios, but it is unclear if he was a Grand Droungarios of the Watch	
Theodore Palaiologos	c. 1328	Andronikos III Palaiologos	A nephew of Andronikos III, he was Grand Droungarios of the Watch and governor of Lemnos in 1328	
George Bryennios	c. 1328	Andronikos II Palaiologos	A military commander against the Bulgarians, he governed Ohrid as Grand Droungarios after 1328.	
John Doukas Mouzalon	unknown	Andronikos III Palaiologos	An addressee of the poet Manuel Philes, he is called a "Grand Droungarios", most likely of the Watch	
John Gabalas	c. 1341	Andronikos III Palaiologos	Originally a partisan of John Kantakouzenos, he was Grand Droungarios, probably of the Watch, in 1341. He was persuaded by Alexios Apokaukos to side with the regency during the Byzantine civil war of 1341–1347 and rose to the post of Grand Logothete, but eventually fell out with Apokaukos and was imprisoned.	
George Doukas Apokaukos	c. 1342	John V Palaiologos	Grand Droungarios, probably of the Watch, mentioned in a chrysobull of 1342 with Venice	
Johanne de Peralta	1347–54	John VI Kantakouzenos	A Westerner, possibly Catalan, and friend and adherent of Kantakouzenos.	
Demetrios Glabas	c. 1366	John V Palaiologos	Grand Droungarios of the Watch at Thessalonica in 1366.	
Komes	c. 1366	John V Palaiologos	Grand Droungarios of the Watch at Thessalonica in 1366.	

== Sources ==
- Bury, J. B.; Philotheus (1911). The Imperial Administrative System of the Ninth Century (With a Revised Text of the Kletorologion of Philotheos). London: Oxford University Press.
- Gautier, Paul (1971). "Le synode des Blachernes (fin 1094). Étude prosopographique". Revue des études byzantines (in French). 29: 213–284. doi:10.3406/rebyz.1971.1445.
- Guilland, Rodolphe (1967). "Le Drongaire et le Grand drongaire de la Veille". Recherches sur les institutions byzantines, Tome I (in French). Berlin: Akademie Verlag. pp. 563–587.
- Haldon, John (1999). Warfare, State and Society in the Byzantine World, 565–1204. London: UCL Press. ISBN 1-85728-495-X.
- Kazhdan, Alexander (1991). "Droungarios tes viglas". In Kazhdan, Alexander (ed.). The Oxford Dictionary of Byzantium. Oxford and New York: Oxford University Press. p. 663. ISBN 0-19-504652-8.
- Kazhdan, Alexander; Cutler, Anthony (1991). "Skylitzes, John". In Kazhdan, Alexander (ed.). The Oxford Dictionary of Byzantium. Oxford and New York: Oxford University Press. p. 1914. ISBN 0-19-504652-8.
- Kühn, Hans-Joachim (1991). Die byzantinische Armee im 10. und 11. Jahrhundert: Studien zur Organisation der Tagmata (in German). Vienna: Fassbaender Verlag. ISBN 3-9005-38-23-9.
- Lilie, Ralph-Johannes; Ludwig, Claudia; Pratsch, Thomas; Zielke, Beate (2013). Prosopographie der mittelbyzantinischen Zeit Online. Berlin-Brandenburgische Akademie der Wissenschaften. Nach Vorarbeiten F. Winkelmanns erstellt (in German). Berlin and Boston: De Gruyter.
- Magdalino, Paul (2002) [1993]. The Empire of Manuel I Komnenos, 1143–1180 (Second ed.). Cambridge: Cambridge University Press. ISBN 9780521526531.
- Magdalino, Paul (1994). "Justice and Finance in the Byzantine State, Ninth to Twelfth Centuries". In Laiou, Angeliki E.; Simon, Dieter (eds.). Law and Society in Byzantium, 9th–12th Centuries. Washington, DC: Dumbarton Oaks. pp. 93–116. ISBN 978-0-88402-222-0.
- Rance, Philip (2004). "Drungus, Δροῦγγος and Δρουγγιστί – A Gallicism and Continuity in Roman Cavalry Tactics". Phoenix. 58: 96–130. doi:10.2307/4135199. JSTOR 4135199.
- Trapp, Erich; Beyer, Hans-Veit; Walther, Rainer; Sturm-Schnabl, Katja; Kislinger, Ewald; Leontiadis, Ioannis; Kaplaneres, Sokrates (1976–1996). Prosopographisches Lexikon der Palaiologenzeit (in German). Vienna: Verlag der Österreichischen Akademie der Wissenschaften. ISBN 3-7001-3003-1.
- Verpeaux, Jean, ed. (1966). Pseudo-Kodinos, Traité des Offices (in French). Paris: Centre National de la Recherche Scientifique.
