= Epi ton kriseon =

Byzantine judicial official

The epi ton kriseon (Greek: ἐπὶ τῶν κρίσεων, "in charge of judgements") was a judicial official of the Byzantine Empire responsible for presiding over tribunals involving civil lawsuits.

The position was first established by Emperor Constantine IX Monomachos (r. 1042–1055) as part of his legislative reforms, sometime between 1043 and 1047. During the 11th and 12th centuries, the tribunal of the epi ton kriseon was one of the four high courts of the Byzantine Empire, alongside those of the droungarios tes viglas, the quaestor and the Eparch of Constantinople. According to the history of Michael Attaleiates, the thematic (provincial) judges had to write and submit copies of their verdicts to the epi ton kriseon. This was possibly a safeguard due to the provincial judges' low level of legal knowledge, but the epi ton kriseon did not function as a court of appeal.

The office survived at least until the dissolution of the Empire by the Fourth Crusade in 1204. One of the last and most famous occupants was the historian Niketas Choniates.

== Sources ==
- Kaldellis, Anthony; Krallis, Dimitris, eds. (2012). The History. Michael Attaleiates. Cambridge, MA: Harvard University Press. ISBN 978-0-67-405799-9.
- Kazhdan, Alexander; Macrides, Ruth J. (1991). "Epi ton kriseon". In Kazhdan, Alexander (ed.). The Oxford Dictionary of Byzantium. New York and Oxford: Oxford University Press. pp. 724–725. ISBN 978-0-19-504652-6.
- Magoulias, Harry J., ed. (1984). O City of Byzantium: Annals of Niketas Choniates. Detroit, MI: Wayne State University Press. ISBN 978-0-81-431764-8.
