= Mangana (Constantinople) =

Coordinates: 41.0119°N 28.9871°E

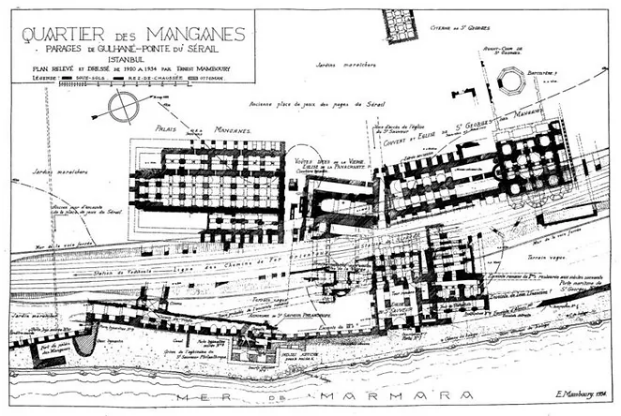
Map of Mangana as reconstructed from archeological surveys.

Mangana (Greek: Μάγγανα) was one of the quarters of Byzantine-era Constantinople. Located on the easternmost edge of the Sirkeci peninsula, it housed an imperial palace, arsenal and several churches and charitable establishments throughout the middle and late Byzantine periods.

== History ==
The quarter was located on the extreme east of the peninsula, directly above the Great Palace and between the ancient acropolis of Byzantium and the Bosporus strait. It took its name from a large arsenal for military engines (mangana). The site was closely connected to the nearby Great Palace, and several emperors constructed buildings there. Emperor Michael I Rhangabe (r. 811–813) owned a mansion there which was converted into a crown domain by Emperor Basil I (r. 867–886) and administered by a kourator. The position of [megas] kourator ([μέγας] κουράτωρ τῶν Μαγγάνων) also involved the supervision of imperial estates in the provinces, whose proceeds went to the upkeep of the imperial court, as well as to supplying military expeditions.

Emperor Constantine IX Monomachos (r. 1042–1055) built a monastery dedicated to Saint George (with a cloister and surrounding garden), as well as a hospital, a palace, old-age homes, hostels, poor-houses, and a law school. During his reign, Constantine IX granted the "pronoia of Mangana" to Constantine (III) Leichoudes who would later become Patriarch of Constantinople. The term pronoia would usually mean that Leichoudes enjoyed the proceeds of the Mangana, but in this case its meaning is debatable. During the 14th century, Emperor John VI Kantakouzenos (r. 1347–1354) lived at Mangana as a monk for a period of time after his abdication in 1354.

=== Monastery of Saint George ===
Constantine IX died after contracting pleurisy while bathing in the pond at the monastery of Saint George in January 1055. He was ultimately buried at the monastery. Years later, the palace that Emperor Monomachos built at Mangana was destroyed by Emperor Isaac II Angelos (r. 1185–1195 and 1203–1204), but the monastery complex of Saint George survived until the fall of Constantinople in May 1453. Since its construction, the Byzantine imperial court made annual visits to the monastery on April 23, which was the feast day of Saint George. This tradition was interrupted during the Fourth Crusade in 1204, after which Latin monks briefly occupied the monastery, until the Reconquest of Constantinople by the Byzantines in 1261. During the Byzantine civil war of 1341–1347, the Byzantine theologian and statesman Demetrios Kydones retired to an apartment at the monastery of Saint George after having obtained an adelphaton (or the right, granted on payment of a sum of money, to live in a monastery without becoming a monk). The monastery was particularly famous during the 14th century when it contained relics of the Passion of Christ and became a place of pilgrimage for Orthodox faithful from as far away as Russia. After the Fall of Constantinople in 1453, the monastery complex was occupied for a short time by dervishes, before being demolished by the Ottomans to make way for the construction of the Topkapi Palace.

== See also ==
- Gerasimus I of Constantinople

== Sources ==
- Dendrinos, Charalambos; Harris, Jonathan; Harvalia-Crook, Eirene; et al., eds. (2003). Porphyrogenita: Essays on the History and Literature of Byzantium and the Latin East in Honour of Julian Chrysostomides. Aldershot, England: Ashgate Publishing Limited. ISBN 978-0-7546-3696-0.
- Franzius, Enno (1967). History of the Byzantine Empire: Mother of Nations. New York: Funk & Wagnalls.
- Mango, Cyril; Talbot, Alice-Mary (1991). "Mangana". In Kazhdan, Alexander (ed.). The Oxford Dictionary of Byzantium. Oxford and New York: Oxford University Press. ISBN 0-19-504652-8.
- Magdalino, Paul (2002) [1993]. The Empire of Manuel I Komnenos, 1143–1180. Cambridge: Cambridge University Press. ISBN 0-521-52653-1.
- McGeer, Eric; Nesbitt, John; Oikonomides, Nicolas, eds. (2005). Catalogue of Byzantine Seals at Dumbarton Oaks and in the Fogg Museum of Art, Volume 5: The East (continued), Constantinople and Environs, Unknown Locations, Addenda, Uncertain Readings. Washington, DC: Dumbarton Oaks Research Library and Collection. ISBN 0-88402-309-5.
