= Covered Hippodrome =

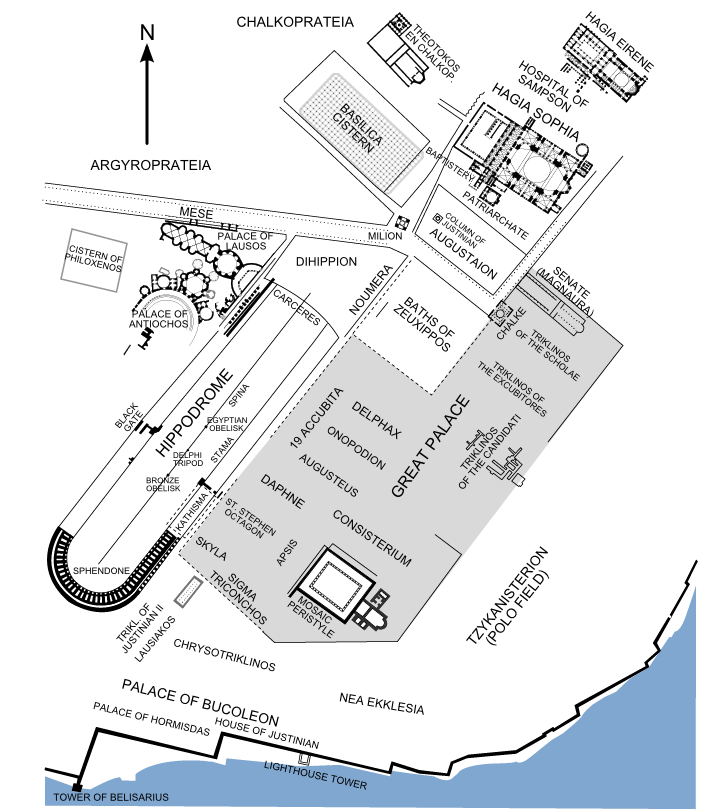
The Great palace district. The Covered Hippodrome lay in the southeastern corner of the shaded area

The Covered Hippodrome (Greek: σκεπαστός ἱππόδρομος) was a covered courtyard that served as an antechamber to the Great Palace of Constantinople in Istanbul, Turkey. The French scholar Rodolphe Guilland also equated it with the emperors' private hippodrome. It lay on the southeastern corner of the palace complex, and connected the Palace of Daphne in the north with the later lower palace complex around Bucoleon in the south, through the gate of Skyla. It played a great role in imperial ceremonies, and is not to be confused with the far larger adjacent Hippodrome of Constantinople, which in Byzantine sources was often distinguished as the "uncovered" (ἀσκέπαστος) Hippodrome. From the 9th to the 11th centuries, it was also the site of one of the Byzantine capital's highest courts, the tribunals of the "judges of the Hippodrome" (κριταὶ τοῦ ἱπποδρόμου) and of the "judges of the velum" (κριταὶ τοῦ βήλου).

== Sources ==
- Guilland, Rodolphe (1969). "L'hippodrome couvert". Études de topographie de Constantinople byzantine, Tome I (in French). Berlin: Akademie-Verlag. pp. 165–210.
- Laiou, Angeliki E.; Simon, Dieter, eds. (1994). Law and society in Byzantium, 9th–12th centuries. Dumbarton Oaks. ISBN 978-0-88402-222-0.
