= Borilos and Germanos =

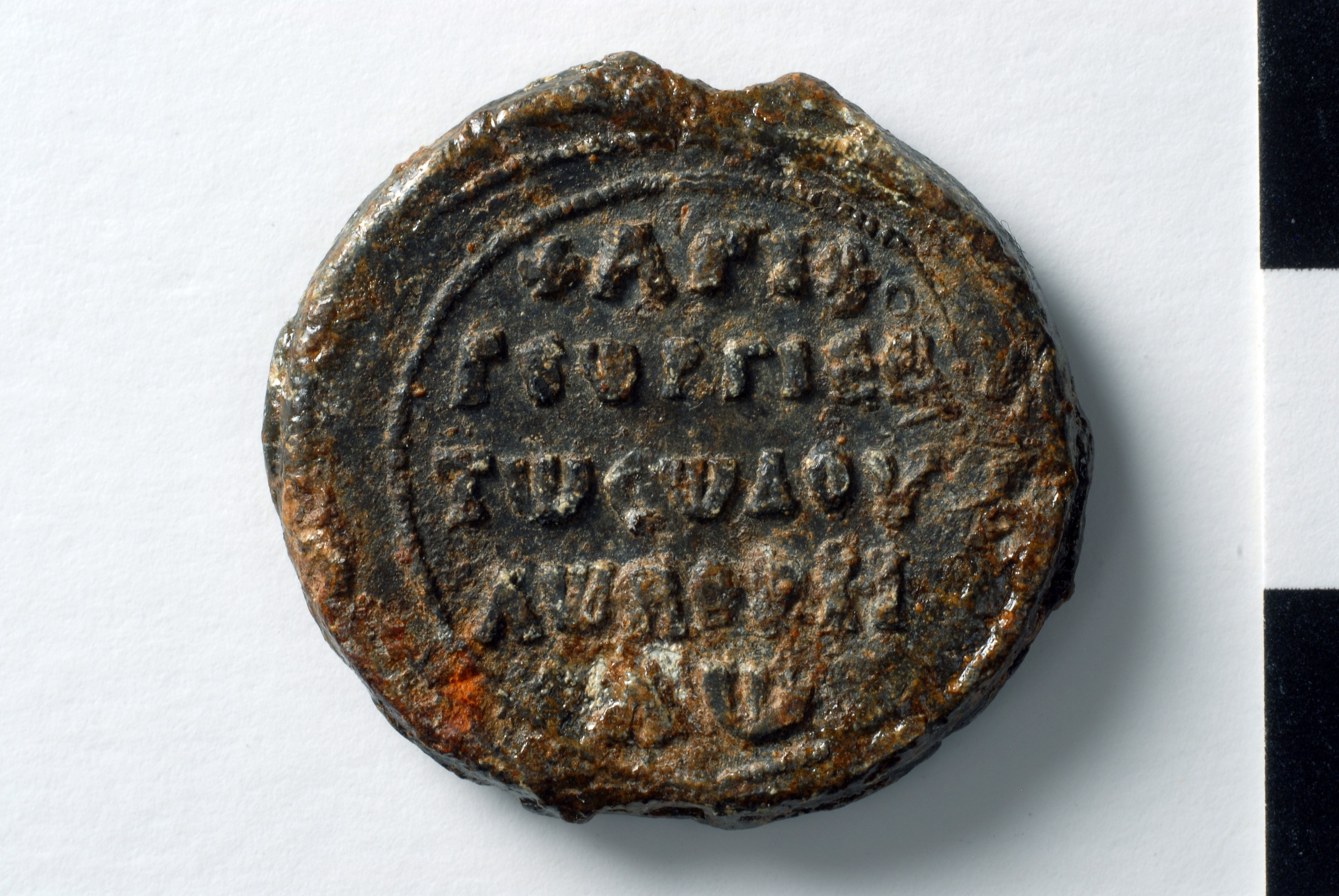
Seal of Borilos.

Borilos (Greek: Βορίλος, Βορήλος; fl. 1078–1081) was a Byzantine proedros under emperor Nikephoros III Botaneiates (r. 1078–1081) that also held the title of primikerios of the ethnikoi (or "ethnarch"), that is, commander of foreign troops stationed in the Great Palace. As such, he was the chief commander of the emperor's bodyguard. His colleague was Germanos (Greek: Γερμανός). Both were Balkan Slavs (also called barbarians and "Scythians" by Anna Komnene and "Scythians or Moesians" by Nikephoros Bryennios the Younger), and former slaves of Nikephoros. Borilos was described as a very brave and capable man, and held considerable influence in the court.

Borilos helped general Nikephoros take the crown in 1078. He was sent ahead of him to secure the palace. Upon the capture of Nikephoros Bryennios the Elder, Borilos "[Botaneiates'] most loyal and close man", was sent to bring him to Botaneiates. Borilos and Germanos were adversaries of brothers Alexios Komnenos and Isaac Komnenos. The Komnenos disliked them. Borilos and Germanos, trusted men of Botaneiates, intrigued against Georgios Monomachatos, which forced him to leave Constantinople, emperor Botaneiates appointing him an official in Dyrrhachion. Monomachatos was a friend of Alexios Komnenos, and told him about the affair; Komnenos promised to get revenge. When Alexios was appointed strategos in the West, the two intrigued against the Komnenos brothers, but they were saved and rose in the court through their friendly relations with empress Maria of Alania. Anna Komnene called Borilos and Germanos co-rulers. Alexios and Isaac stopped arriving at the court together, as to not "fall into secret plots" of Borilos and Germanos, and one of them could continue if the other was removed. The Komnenos won over nobility and had continued support from empress Maria, which further enraged Borilos and Germanos who now planned to have them sentenced for treachery and their eyes plucked. According to Komnene, the Komnenos brothers now sought to rise up against Botaneiates. Botaneiates mobilized the army against the Turks, and Borilos believed Alexios mustered an army to take Constantinople. Alexios defended himself in an audience before the emperor, while Borilos complained against him, and Germanos "being openhearted", did not have much to say against Alexios. Komnene claims that some believed that Borilos in fact wanted the crown. Borilos, with the help of Germanos, planned an ambush against the Komnenos brothers, which an Alanian-born magister heard and told the Komnenos. The Komnenos left Constantinople in mid-February 1081 to raise an army against Botaneiates. Alexios' brother-in-law George Palaiologos had his men open the Constantinople gates and the rebel army met little resistance. The city was engulfed in chaos, with looting and raping, by Alexios' troops and local thugs. Borilos took command of the Varangian Guard which stationed itself in the Constantinople Forum and planned to attack Alexios. Botaneiates abdicated after some persuasion and Alexios was proclaimed the new emperor.

Borilos' seals have survived, including one with St. George and the inscription "Saint George, help your servant Borilos", and another with St. George and the titles proedros and megas primikerios.

== Sources ==
- Карашайски, Кемран Меметович. "Этники и ксеники, наемники и союзники: к проблеме византийской терминологии в отношении иностранных наемников в середине IX–XI вв." Via in tempore. История. Политология 51.2 (2024): 344–353.
- Krekić, B. (1966). "Ана Комнина". Византијски извори за историју народа Југославије, том III. III. Византолошки институт: 367–394.
- Radojčić, B. (1966). "Нићифор Вријеније". Византијски извори за историју народа Југославије, том III. III. Византолошки институт: 235–244.
- McGeer, Eric; Nesbitt, John (2019). Byzantium in the Time of Troubles: The Continuation of the Chronicle of John Skylitzes (1057-1079). BRILL. pp. 176–77, 189–90. ISBN 978-90-04-41940-7.
- Norwich, John J. (1995). Byzantium: The Decline and Fall. Alfred A. Knopf, Inc. ISBN 978-0-679-41650-0.
