= Anna of Byzantium =

Anna of Byzantium may refer to:

- Anna of Constantinople (disambiguation)
- Anna of Savoy (1306–1365), Byzantine Empress consort
- Anna Comnena and the Alexiad
- Anna of Byzantium, the wife of Grand Prince Uroš I of Serbia
- Anna from Byzantium, a Greek noblewoman or princess who became princess of Halych
- Anna of Byzantium (novel), a 1999 novel by Tracy Barrett
