= Women in the Byzantine Empire =

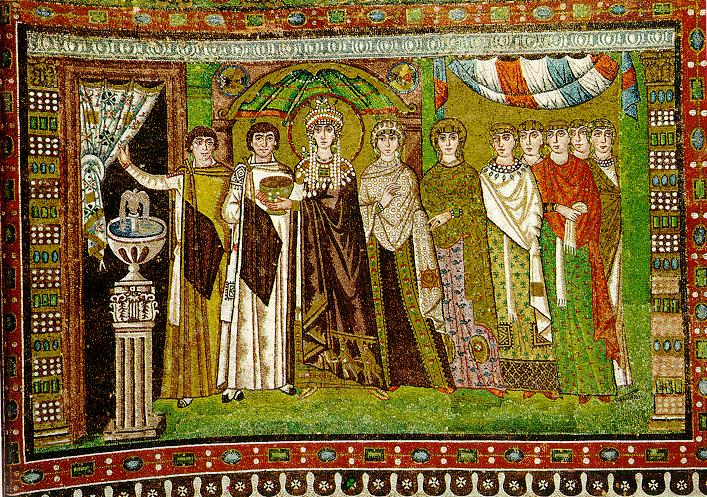
Empress Theodora with her retinue. Mosaic of the Basilica of San Vitale in Ravenna, VI century.

The situation of women in the Byzantine Empire is a subject of scientific research that encompasses all available information about women, their environments, their networks, their legal status, etc., in the Byzantine Empire.

This field of study experiences debates within it on various important questions. For a long time, the attention of historians was attracted only by individual prominent Byzantine women, mainly the Empress, especially the wife of Emperor Justinian I Theodora, who had a significant influence on the events of the first half of the 6th century. Numerous sources (chronicles, legal texts, hagiographic literature) however paint a picture of the Byzantine patriarchal society in which women in general did not have independent significance and upper class women were imprisoned in a gynaeceum.

The scientific study of the legal and economic status of women in the Byzantine Empire began in the second half of the 19th century and is currently intensively ongoing. The subject of study is both women in general and related issues of family and property law. The scarcity of surviving sources leads to diverse assessments of the place of women in Byzantine society. With the development of gender studies in the 1970s, there is a tendency to revise early views, according to which this role was not significant. The historian Ioli Kalavrezou provides a more positive description of the lives of Byzantine women. Several authors today assume that Byzantine women enjoyed significantly more privileges in comparison to women in Western Europe and the Islamic world.

== Education ==
The general view of women's education was that it was sufficient for a girl to learn domestic duties and to study the lives of the Christian saints and memorize psalms, and to learn to read so that she could study Bible scriptures – though literacy among women was sometimes discouraged because it was believed it could encourage vice. However, there were individual Byzantine women, who famed for their educational accomplishments, such as Kassia, Anna Komnene and Dobrodeia of Kiev.

== Sexuality ==
=== Marriage ===
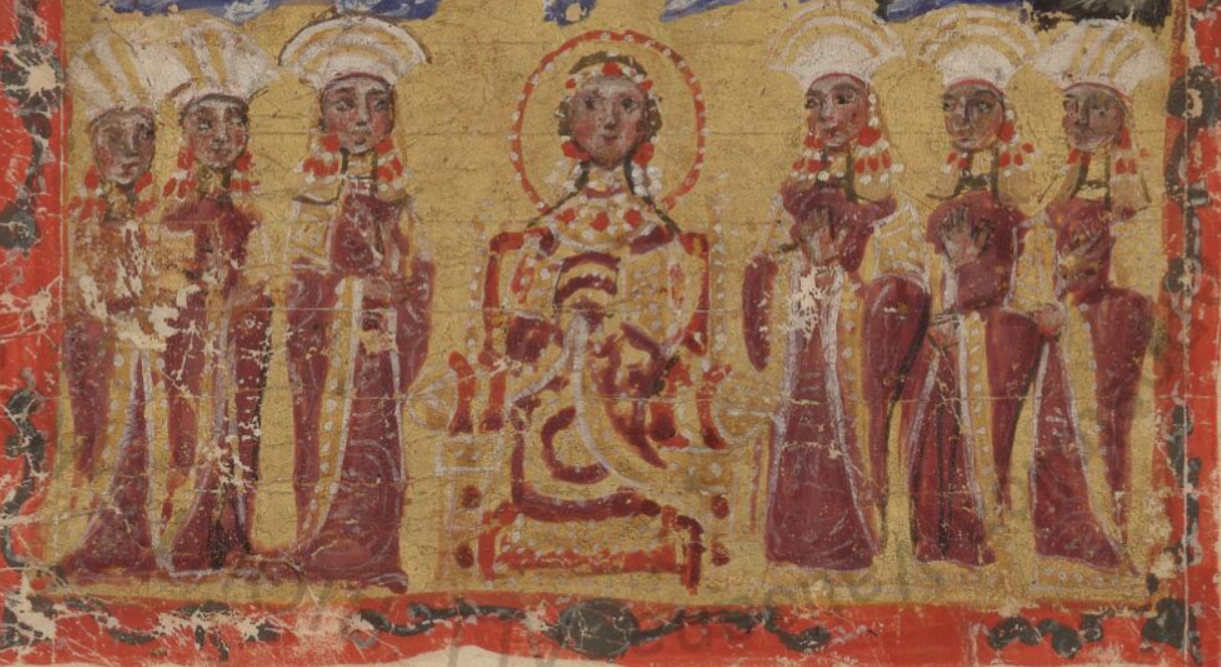
Agnes of France (aged 8) at her wedding to Alexios II Komnenos (aged 10) (Note: The identification of this figure from Vat. Gr. 1851 as Agnes of France is by Ioannis Spatharakis. Other historians variously identify her as Maria of Bulgaria or Anna of Hungary.)

Byzantine women were married usually by the age of fourteen, though some women married later, as for instance Thomais of Lesbos who married aged twenty-four. Marriage was regarded as the ideal state for a woman, and only convent life was seen as a legitimate alternative. Within marriage, sexual activity was regarded only as the means of reproduction. The Roman right to actual divorce was gradually erased after the introduction of Christianity and replaced with legal separation and annulation. A woman had the right to appear before court, but her testimony was not regarded as equal to that of a man, and could be contradicted on the basis of her sex if put against that of a man. On the other hand, women were not entirely subordinated to the will of men. According to the Early Byzantine diplomat and political thinker Priscus of Pannion, '[a]mongst the Romans it was not right to betroth a woman to a man against her will'. Theodore of Sykeon in his Life 'depicts a household of strong women, with no male head, who converge to spoil and promote the one young male child in the family. The women have some choice in their lives, they are able to make a living through the proceeds of the inn, and later, Theodore's grandmother chooses the religious life while his mother marries into a prominent family.'

=== Ascetic ideal of a woman ===
According to Judith Herrin, sexuality in the Byzantine Empire was saturated with hypocritical double standards, as in any other medieval society. On the one hand, men appreciated female charm and resorted to the services of prostitutes and mistresses, on the other hand, demanded moral purity from their relatives. Moreover, in Byzantium, the Christian church played a huge role, whose ideas about the relationship of the sexes were formed in the period Early Christianity. Christianity has inherited beliefs from Classical antiquity that women are physically and morally weaker than men, more prone to the needs and desires of their bodies, and therefore less able to understand what is good, and if they understand, to adhere to it. Finally with rare exceptions, Byzantine literature was created by men and reflects their views.

Until the 12th century, in the Byzantine Empire there was no erotic literature and erotic art in general, and the subject of expression of feelings was the attitude of ascetic to God, which implied the complete elimination of sexuality. According to the general idea, a woman was responsible for the desire arising to her in a man, and even for a monk, the best way was not to look at women. There was no general consensus on whether disgusting sexual desire is always dangerous. Some Christian authors of the 4th century agreed that the desire was given by God for the purpose of procreation, and a married person can lead a Christian life no less than one who adheres to celibacy. Some believed that a chaste man and woman could live in the same house without risk to their souls, however, the practical experience of ascetics indicated that sexual desire was almost impossible to contain. In this sense, even a mother or sister could become a reminder to the ascetic of all the other women and the rejected worldly life in general. In this regard, for an ascetic woman, it was necessary to abandon an attractive appearance, wear clothes hiding the figure, and abandon her social status. The washing was condemned, as it once again attracted attention to the rejected body.

=== Prostitution ===
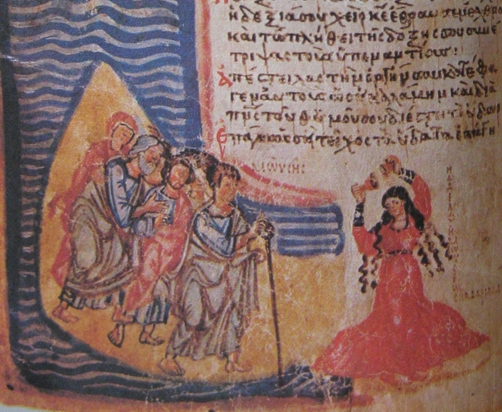
Miriam dancing with cymbals in Greek tradition. Miniature from Khludov Psalter, Byzantine Empire, mid-9th century

The prostitutes were at the bottom of the social ladder and were known by a variety of names – hetairai, "public women", "(women) from the attic" (Ancient Greek: αἱ ἐπὶ τοῦ τέγους). They are more known from hagiographic literature (where they appear under the designation "humiliated" (Ancient Greek: ταπειναί) or "miserable" (Ancient Greek: οἰκτραί)) or in civil or church law attempting to limit this phenomenon. Probably, prostitution has always been prevalent in Byzantium. However, the word Ancient Greek: πορνεία referred not only to communication with prostitutes, but to many other deviations from the recommended sexual behavior. Prostitution flourished in the capital and the largest cities of the empire – Alexandria, Antioch, Berytus and Edessa, later in Thessalonica and ports of Asia Minor.

Engaging in this activity was relatively voluntary when the daughters of actors or artisans were seduced by tales spread by the brothel holders (Ancient Greek: πορνοβοσκοί) about the luxurious life of getters; also prostitutes could become slaves and prisoners. Mistresses of brothels also went to the provinces to find suitable girls, buying them in poor families. However, such transactions were illegal, and the found father of the family was deprived of parental rights and could be sent as a punishment to the mines; for the members of the Church, the punishment was excommunication. But, obviously, these measures were applied without much success, and at least in the 12th century, prostitution was not only voluntary. Attempts to limit prostitution geographically were also futile even in Constantinople – founded even under Constantine the Great Lupanar was empty, and under the emperor Theophilos (829–843) the building was transferred to the hospital. Yet, under Justinian's reign, the empire saw a plethora of reforms directed to females working in prostitution, both to pursue rights and protection from forced work, as well as welfare efforts to encourage repentance and reformation.

Women whose activities involved the trading of their bodies also included mime artists, performers on flute, singers at weddings or banquets, and actresses on stage that were considered by audience members to be sexually available. According to the Byzantines, engaging in secular art is not befitting an honest man, and women of these professions were considered prostitutes of a separate kind. The lower class prostitutes were considered to be maidservants in taverns and xenodochiums, about which, according to the tradition dating from ancient times.

A frequent topos of Byzantine hagiographic literature was the spiritual degeneration of the “harlot," who, repenting, "acquired holiness for herself." So, for example, this happened with a saint of the 5th century Pelagia of Antioch or a saint of the 6th century Mary of Egypt. According to the suggestion of Judith Herrin, the mother of Constantine the Great Saint Helena was a prostitute in the tavern.

== Public role ==
=== Gender segregation ===
From the 6th century there was a growing ideal of gender segregation, which dictated that women should wear veils and only be seen in public when attending church, and while the ideal was never fully enforced, it influenced society. The laws of emperor Justinian I made it legal for a man to divorce his wife for attending public premises—such as theatres or public baths—without his permission, and Emperor Leo VI banned women from witnessing business contracts with the argument that it caused them to come into contact with men. In Constantinople, upper class women were increasingly expected to keep to a special women's section (gynaikonitis), and by the 8th century it was described as unacceptable for unmarried daughters to meet unrelated men. While imperial women and their ladies appeared in public alongside men, women and men at the Imperial Court attended royal banquets separately until the rise of the Comnenus dynasty in the 12th century. According to Averil Cameron, '[t]he message of the prevailing ideology' in Byzantium 'was that women should stay at home, be good mothers and confine their activity to acts of pious charity. Yet the reality was somewhat different. For example, women could inherit, the dowry system was a protection for them ... Many non-aristocratic women also found ways of exercising influence outside the home, and at lower levels, as in all agrarian societies, and in pre-industrial towns generally, their labour was essential.' The freedom of movement might have also depended upon the social status and the location; whereas Mary the Younger had to curtail her activities outside the house once she moved into a larger town from a village, the lower-born Thomais of Lesbos moved freely in Constantinople by day and night.

While it is commonly assumed that in Byzantine society modesty and shyness best suited the female nature and temperament, there is no strict consensus throughout the entire Byzantine millennia of what truly 'modest norms' stand for. For example, Byzantine women were considered 'sexually promiscuous' in the eyes of Arabs; Byzantine women, they assumed, who had no husband and choose not to marry, preferred adultery and they were free to do what they pleased.

=== Economy and professional life ===
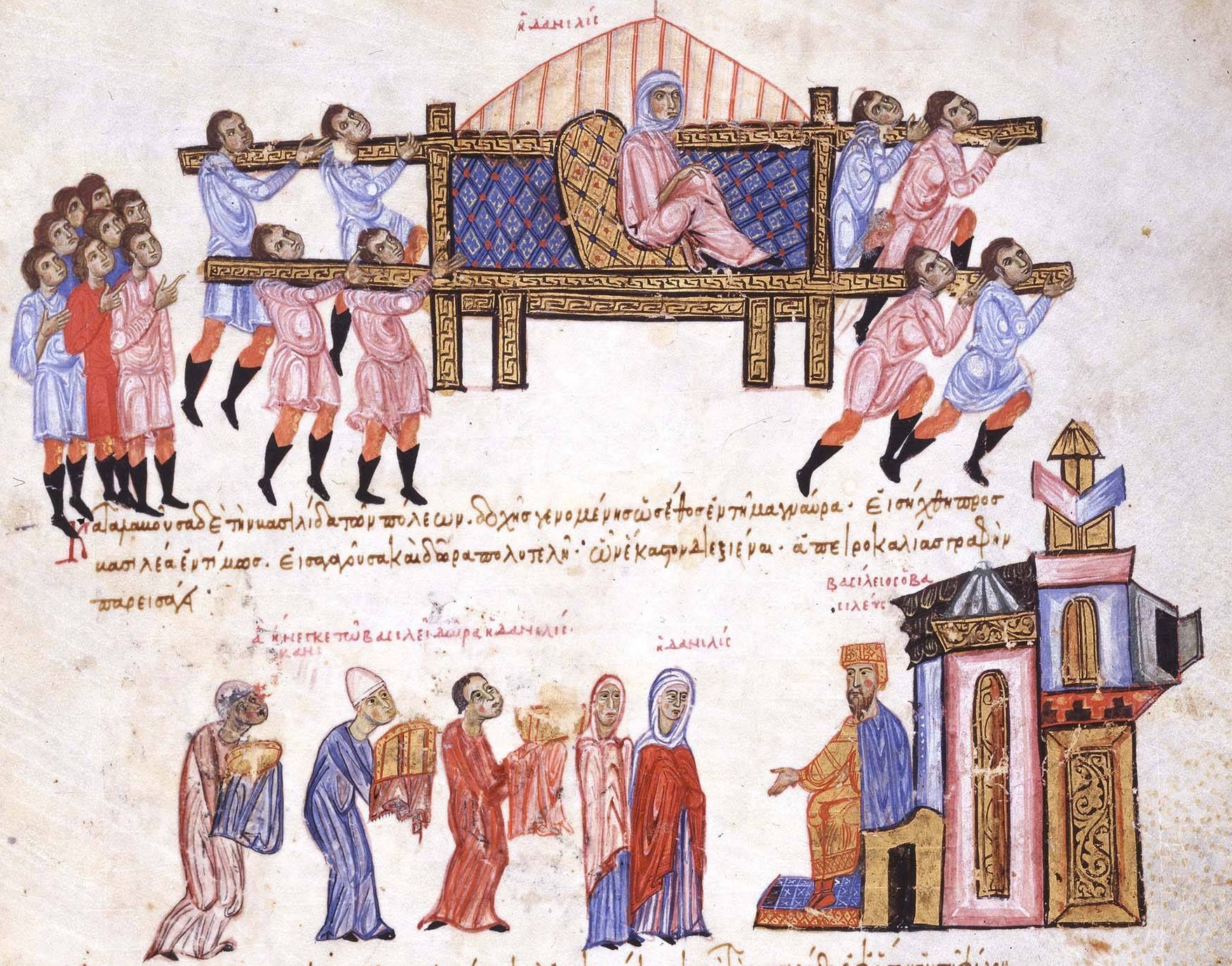
Businesswoman Danielis being carried by her slaves to Constantinople. Miniature from the chronicle of Ioannis Skylitzes, mid-13th century. Madrid Biblioteca Nacional

Eastern Roman and later Byzantine women retained the Roman woman's right to inherit, own, and manage their property and sign contracts, rights which were far superior to the rights of married women in Medieval Catholic Western Europe, as these rights included not only unmarried women and widows, but married women as well. A significant reform enabled women to reclaim their dowry and obtain an extent of financial independence.

Women's legal right to handle their own money made it possible for rich women to engage in business, however, women who actively had to find a profession to support themselves normally worked as domestics or in domestic fields such as the food or textile industries. Women could work as medical physicians and attendants of women patients and visitors at hospitals and public baths with government support.

As prostitution was rampant in the Byzantine empire due to poverty, reforms were introduced by Emperor Justinian and Empress Theodora concerning welfare and exoneration from their previous professions. This included a 'championing' of rights for sex workers rather than the common practice exile, alongside building a convent for repentance for women to escape poverty and prostitution.

After the introduction of Christianity, women could no longer become priestesses, but it became common for women to found and manage nunneries, which functioned as schools for girls as well as asylums, poor houses, hospitals, prisons and retirement homes for women, and many Byzantine women practiced social work as lay sisters and deaconesses.

=== Political participation ===
The Byzantine Empire was a monarchy, and as in many other monarchies, the royal system allowed for women to participate in politics as monarchs in their own name or as regents in place of a husband or son. Many royal women are known to have participated in politics during the centuries. Among them were female monarchs like Pulcheria, Irene of Athens and Theodora Porphyrogenita, as well as female regents such as Theodora, Theophano and Eudokia Makrembolitissa. There were also empresses who engaged in the political arena both alongside and autonomous to their husbands, most famously Theodora (wife of Justinian I), known for her cunning in court and pursuit of reform, most especially females in poverty and sex work. The royal system allowed for women to participate in politics because they were royal, but this was reserved for royal women and did not apply to women in general, nor did it signify acceptance for female participation in politics as such. At the time Irene of Athens was a sole Empress, Pope Leo III considered Irene's alleged unprecedented status as a female ruler of the Roman Empire and proclaimed Charlemagne emperor of the Holy Roman Empire on Christmas Day of 800. He assumed that a woman could not rule and so the throne of the Roman Empire was actually vacant.

In regard to the historiography of women's political activity in the Byzantine Empire, there are two main points of view. According to one of them, women were isolated from the rest of society in a gynaeceum. In this case, historians refer to the relevant statements of Michael Psellos, Kekaumenos and Michael Attaleiates. Another point of view, more common at the present time, is that the isolation of women in the sources does not reflect the real state of affairs, but the ideal idea of Byzantine men. Since the 12th century, numerous examples of the opposite have been known. Talking about how her mother accompanied Alexios I on campaigns, Anna Komnene, the first female historian of Europe, speaks not only about how she took care of the emperor’s sore legs, but also was his adviser, who helped identify the conspirators. According to the writer, "these were the reasons that overpowered the natural shame of this woman and gave her the courage to appear before the eyes of men". The wife of Emperor John VI, Irene Asanina, ruled the city of Didymoteicho during the absence of her husband during the second civil war (1341–1347). Their daughter Maria ruled the fortress of Ainos a few years later, in place of her husband Nikephoros, who was the Despotate of Epirus.

According to Angeliki Laiou, the role of Byzantine women in the political life of the country was significant in the late period of its history in connection with the consolidation of the aristocracy, whose position became dominant. Within this ruling class, women were important because they possessed significant property and had influence over their children. The importance of family ties in the Komnenos period was noted by the Soviet-American Byzantinist Alexander Kazhdan.

However, the authority of women's voices in particular can be debated when it comes to studying political letters. In an article written by historian Julia Hillner, she argues that 6th-century letters in particular are more useful to us as evidence when studied as a collective, comparing male and female language features, rather than reading single letters to gage an individual woman's feelings or ambitions. By applying her research on gender-specific language, she suggests that many surviving female letters were drafted by men, and that their "female" features reflect a male-constructed idea of how women spoke. This conflicts with previously mentioned ideas about women's political participation. Although Byzantine women could own property and royal women could rule or act as regents, their public voice was often shaped within male and court-defined norms. However, this does not mean that women had no involvement in their letters. Letter writing at high levels was a collective process which opened opportunities for imperial women to exercise power. Although, an empress' voice would only be framed as authoritative when it served the empire's interests which reflects previous ideas that royal women's political participation stemmed from their royal status and did not signal wider acceptance of women in politics.
