= John Doukas (son of Nikephoros Bryennios) =

Byzantine aristocrat and military commander

John Doukas (Greek: Ἰωάννης Δούκας, c. 1103 – after 1173) was a Byzantine aristocrat and military commander.

== Life ==
Born around 1103, John was a younger son of the general and historian Nikephoros Bryennios the Younger and Anna Komnene, the eldest daughter of Emperor Alexios I Komnenos (r. 1081–1118). In the sources, he is never referred to with the surnames "Komnenos" or "Bryennios", but always with the name "Doukas", which he inherited from his maternal grandmother, Empress Irene Doukaina. He married at the same time as his older brother, Alexios, in 1122. John too married a princess from an unnamed Caucasian principality, whose original name is not known. She had come to the Byzantine court at a young age, become a ward of Irene Doukaina and Anna Komnene, and received the name Theodora.

John was active as a military commander, but few details are known about his career. In 1138 he was away on campaign against the Seljuk Turks near the Sangarios River, when his wife died. Later, likely during the reign of Manuel I Komnenos (r. 1143–1180), John fought against the Turks in Anatolia, against the Italo-Normans, and in the Caucasus (likely against Georgia). In 1140/1142 John married a second time. The name and identity of his wife are not known, other than that she was a Byzantine noblewoman noted for her intelligence and education. The historian Konstantinos Varzos hypothesizes that she was possibly the daughter of the senior official Michael Hagiotheodorites.

In 1166, John participated in a church synod that tried the bishop of Lampe for heresy. Both Eustathius of Thessalonica and Constantine Manasses praise John's bravery in their works, as well as his erudition. John died some time after 1173.

== Issue ==
From his first marriage, John had a son, Nikephoros, who likely died at an early age, certainly before 1144.

From his second marriage, John had several children:

- Nikephoros (c. 1144–1173), he was of a scholarly inclination and a student of Eustathius of Thessalonica. He became a sebastos and epi ton deeseon. He married and had offspring, whose names are unknown.
- Andronikos (born c. 1148), became a sebastos and had a military career. Little is known about his life or his family.
- Alexios (born c. 1150), became a sebastos and had a military career. Little is known about his life or his family.
- Manuel (born c. 1160), is only mentioned on the occasion of his brother Nikephoros' death in 1173. Nothing is known about his life or his family.
- Several daughters, whose number of names are not known

== Sources ==
- Varzos, Konstantinos (1984). Η Γενεαλογία των Κομνηνών [The Genealogy of the Komnenoi] (PDF) (in Greek). Vol. A1. Thessaloniki: Centre for Byzantine Studies, University of Thessaloniki.
- Varzos, Konstantinos (1984). Η Γενεαλογία των Κομνηνών [The Genealogy of the Komnenoi] (PDF) (in Greek). Vol. B. Thessaloniki: Centre for Byzantine Studies, University of Thessaloniki.
