= Anna of Byzantium (novel) =

1999 historical novel by Tracy Barrett

- First edition cover
- Author: Tracy Barrett
- Language: English
- Genre: Historical
- Publisher: Delacorte Press Books for Young Readers
- Publication date: June 1999
- Publication place: United States
- Media type: Print (hardback & paperback)
- Pages: 209 (hardback & paperback)
- ISBN: 0-385-32626-2 (hardback edition) & ISBN 0-440-41536-5 (paperback edition)
- OCLC: 40218766
- LC Class: PZ7.B275355 An 1999

Anna of Byzantium is a historical novel by Tracy Barrett originally published in 1999. The novel tells the story of Anna Komnene, the daughter of Alexios I Komnenos.

== Plot summary ==
Born a princess of the Byzantine Empire, Anna is the eldest child of Emperor Alexius I Comnenus of the Byzantine Empire and his wife, Irene Ducas. With only one younger sister, Maria, Anna is her father's chosen successor and she is certain she will inherit the throne upon Alexius' death alongside her betrothed, Constantine Ducas. The emperor's mother and Anna's namesake, Anna Dalassena, is Alexius' most trusted adviser and strongly opposes Irene out of hatred towards the Ducas family for their intrigues. Under her manipulative grandmother, Anna learns statecraft and diplomacy, and Anna excels at all her lessons, becoming a brilliant scholar, and beginning a manuscript that will detail her father's reign.

When Anna is five, Irene gives birth to a son, John. While "barbarians" from foreign lands believe only a son should ascend to power, Anna is dismissive of their attitudes, as are Alexius and Anna Dalassena. However, as Anna matures into a young woman, her grandmother feels threatened by Anna's arrogance and intelligence, realizing that Anna will not be anyone's puppet. Her grandmother moves swiftly to support John as Alexius' successor, devastating Anna as she sees her dreams of power being taken away and given to her brother. Bitter at her grandmother's betrayal, Anna continues to assert she is the true heir to the throne and waits to avenge herself.

Anna's engagement to Constantine Ducas is broken because Constantine dies in war. She is married off to an older general, Nicephorus Bryennius. As the throne begins to grow further from her reach, Anna pours all her energy into her manuscript. When Alexius dies, John is recognized as the new emperor. Moving to seize what is rightfully hers, Anna conspires with Irene, who remains deeply opposed to Anna Dalassena, to depose John by poisoning him and to install Anna as empress. Anna is furious to find her tutor, Simon, has revealed the conspiracy to John and Anna Dalassena. Out of leniency for his sister and mother, both Anna and Irene are banished to separate convents, never to contact one another, despite Anna Dalassena's demands that both be put to death as examples to the Ducas family. When Anna Dalassena protests that John would not have gotten the throne without her influence, John thanks her for obtaining the throne for him before informing her that he no longer needs her. His words effectively dismiss Anna Dalassena from the court, leaving Anna Comnena secretly impressed that her brother will not be a puppet of their grandmother.

While she is refused most luxuries at the convent, Anna manages to bring her manuscript, which she has named the Alexiad. Though she reluctantly admits that her brother has demonstrated himself to be a capable ruler thus far, she resolves to finish the Alexiad without mentioning her brother and be remembered for what she accomplished as a scholar.
