= John Doukas =

John Doukas, Latinized as Ducas (Greek: Ἰωάννης Δούκας, romanized: Iōannēs Doúkas) is the name of several Byzantine aristocrats and their descendants. It may refer to any of the following:

- John Doukas (Caesar) (fl. 1074–1088), brother of Emperor Constantine X Doukas
- John Doukas (megas doux) (c. 1064 – before 1136), brother-in-law of Alexios I Komnenos
- John Doukas (son of Nikephoros Bryennios) (c. 1103 – after 1173), military commander, son of Anna Komnene and Nikephoros Bryennios
- John Doukas (megas hetaireiarches) (fl. 1155–1181), military commander and diplomat
- John Doukas (sebastokrator) (c. 1126 – c. 1200), uncle of Emperors Isaac II Angelos and Alexios III Angelos
- John Doukas Komnenos (1128–1176)
- John III Doukas Vatatzes (1193–1254), Emperor of Nicaea 1222–1254
- John Komnenos Doukas (d. 1244), ruler of Thessalonica and Thessaly 1237–1244
- John Doukas (son of Michael II), son of Michael II of Epirus, hostage in Constantinople
- John I Doukas of Thessaly, ruler of Thessaly 1268–1289
- John II Doukas of Thessaly, ruler of Thessaly 1303–1318
- John II Orsini (also called Doukas), ruler of Epirus 1323–1335
- John Uroš, ruler of Thessaly 1370–1373
