= Yolçatı, Silivri =

Yolçatı
- Neighbourhood
- Location in Turkey Yolçatı (Istanbul)
- Coordinates: 41.1309°N 28.1259°E
- Country: Turkey
- Province: Istanbul
- District: Silivri
- Population (2022): 398
- Time zone: UTC+3 (TRT)

Yolçatı, formerly Gelevri or Galivri, deriving from its Greek name Kalavrye or Kalabrye (Greek: Καλαβρύη), is a neighbourhood in the municipality and district of Silivri, Istanbul Province, Turkey. Its population is 398 (2022).

== History ==
The settlement exists since Late Antiquity, and was until recently known by its Greek name Kalavrye or Kalabrye (Καλαβρύη), also Galavrye/Galabrye (Γαλαβρύη), Kalabria (Καλαβρία), Kalovrye/Kalobrye (Καλοβρύη), and Kalavre (Καλαυρή). In the early 4th century it may have been the seat of a bishop, who by the end of the century moved to neighbouring Selymbria. The inhabitants of the town were involved in the Nika riots of 532 against Emperor Justinian I. The locality is next mentioned in 1078, as the site of the Battle of Kalavrye, where the forces of Emperor Nikephoros III Botaneiates, led by Alexios Komnenos, defeated the army of the rebel general Nikephoros Bryennios the Elder.

It is next mentioned by the Arab geographer al-Idrisi as Geliwrî; al-Idrisi records it simply as a locality close to Selymbria. The village was home to a Greek community (numbering 212 in 1922) until the Greco-Turkish population exchange. It was the site of a Church of the Transfiguration and of a namesake hagiasma, but both have since vanished.

== Sources ==
- Külzer, Andreas (2008). Tabula Imperii Byzantini: Band 12, Ostthrakien (Eurōpē) (in German). Vienna: Österreichische Akademie der Wissenschaften. ISBN 978-3-7001-3945-4.
