= Constantine Choirosphaktes =

Byzantine diplomat and official

Constantine Choirosphaktes (Greek: Κωνσταντίνος Χοιροσφάκτης) was a Byzantine diplomat and official active during the reigns of Nikephoros III Botaneiates (r. 1078–1081) and Alexios I Komnenos (r. 1081–1118).

== Biography ==
Constantine Choirosphaktes first appears in 1078, bearing the rank of proedros, when he was sent by Botaneiates to negotiate with the rebel general Nikephoros Bryennios the Elder. After the coming to power of Alexios Komnenos in June 1081, Constantine, now a protoproedros, was sent as ambassador to the German emperor Henry IV (r. 1084–1105), bearing proposals for an alliance between the two powers.

In 1082, Constantine participated in the synod that condemned John Italos. At the time, he held the office of protonotarios of the dromos. A few years later, in 1088, he is evidenced in a chrysobull as protoproedros and holder of the important post of epi ton deeseon, i.e. "receiver of petitions" addressed to the Byzantine emperor. In 1094, he participated in another synod, which condemned Leo of Chalcedon; on this occasion, he is recorded as holding the rank of kouropalates.

From a seal, it is known that Constantine also held the office of governor, or praetor, of the combined themes of Hellas (Central Greece and Thessaly) and the Peloponnese, but the exact date of his tenure is unknown. Basile Skoulatos hypothesized that this was between 1094 and 1105.

The historian Nikephoros Bryennios the Younger calls him a "prudent and cultivated man, and gifted with all the qualities of a wise politician", while hagiographic sources praise his piety.

== Sources ==
- Skoulatos, Basile (1980). Les personnages byzantins de l'Alexiade: Analyse prosopographique et synthèse [The Byzantine Personalities of the Alexiad: Prosopographical Analysis and Synthesis] (in French). Louvain-la-Neuve and Louvain: Bureau du Recueil Collège Érasme and Éditions Nauwelaerts. OCLC 8468871.
