= Yakov Lyubarsky =

Soviet scholar and philologist

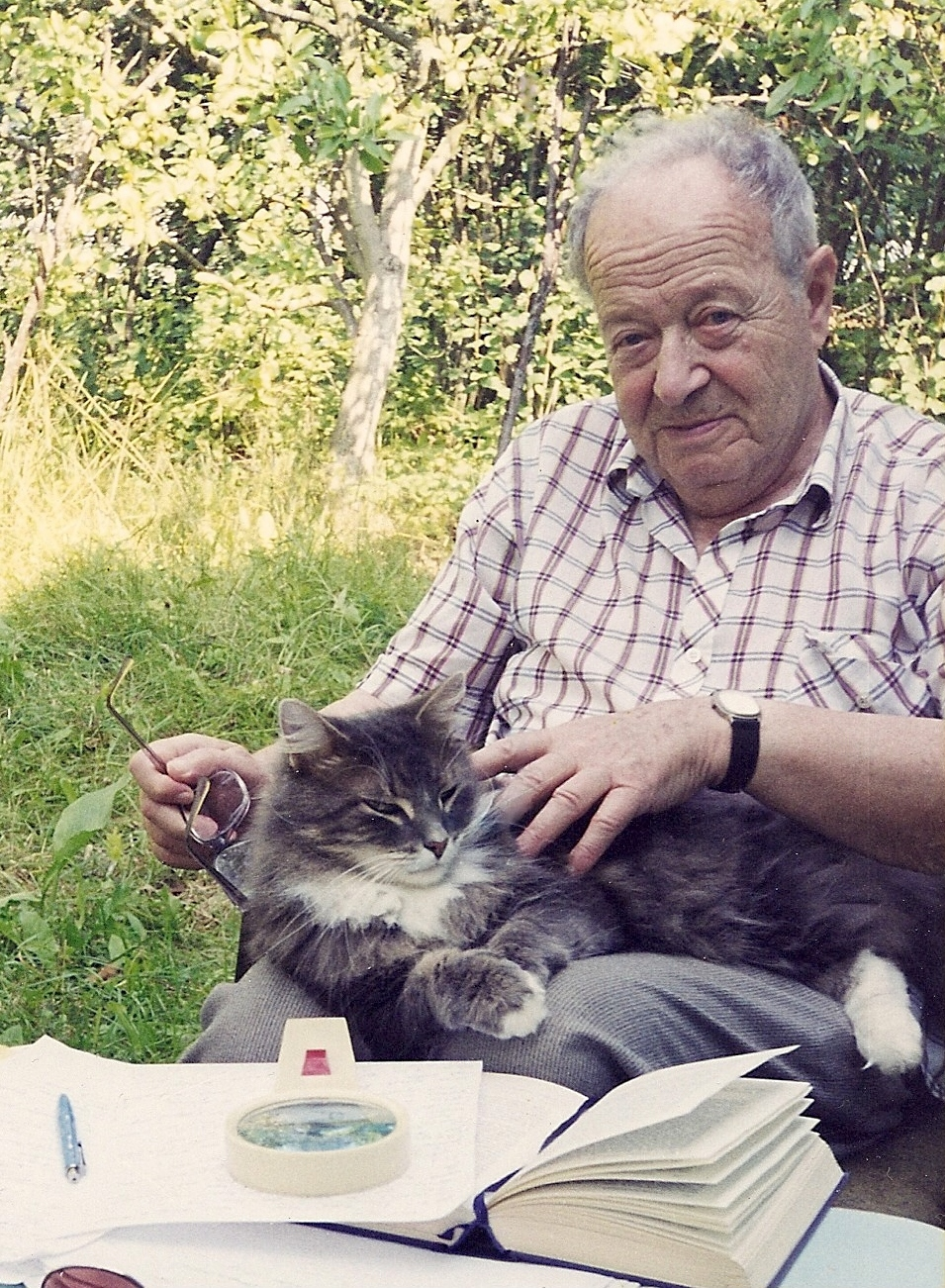
- Yakov Lyubarsky in 1990s
- Born: 7 July 1929; Kiev, Soviet Union
- Died: 30 November 2003 (aged 74); St. Petersburg, Russia
- Scientific career
- Fields: Philologist, byzantinist

Yakov Nikolayevich Lyubarsky (Russian: Яков Николаевич Люба́рский; July 7, 1929 – November 30, 2003) was a Soviet scholar, Doctor of Philology, specialist in Byzantine studies.

== Biography ==
Yakov Lyubarskiy was born in Kiev, but after his birth, the family moved to Leningrad. His father, Nikolai Yakovlevich Lyubarskiy, was a composer and conductor, who worked as a music director for 30 years at the Leningrad Bolshoi Drama Theater; his mother was a music teacher.

During WW2, Yakov Lyubarsky was evacuated from besieged Leningrad and returned to the city only at the end of the war to continue high school, which he finished with honors. In 1946, his fascination with Classical Studies brought him to the Classical Department of Leningrad State University, where among his teachers were such renowned scholars as I.I. Tolstoy, I.M. Tronskiy, O.M. Freudenberg, S.YA. Lurie, YA.M. Borovskiy. Lyubarsky graduated cum laude in 1951 with a double degree in Classical Philology and German Philology.

Recommended by the faculty to the postgraduate program (aspirantura), he however was not accepted due to his Jewish descent and for several years, worked as a German teacher at an evening school for adults.

In 1955 after completing her postgraduate studies, Lyubarsky's wife, also a literary scholar was “distributed” by the Soviet government to Velikie Luki to teach at the department of Russian and Foreign Literature of the local Pedagogical Institute. Yakov was offered a position at the same department. In the ten years that followed, he taught courses in classical and medieval literature, introduction into the history of literature, and the theory of literature and folklore. However, he never abandoned his main interest, classical studies, gradually transitioning in his research from classical antiquity to the later period in the Greek history - Byzantium. It was Alexander Kazhdan, an acclaimed Byzantine scholar and a colleague of Lyubarsky at the Pedagogical Institute in Velikie Luki, who influenced Lyubarsky's decision to change the emphasis of his studies. Kazhdan became his friend and mentor, and Byzantine studies – his livelong passion and the main subject of his research.

In 1964, Yakov Lyubarsky received a Candidate of Historical Sciences degree from the Moscow Pedagogical Institute with a dissertation “Alexiad by Anna Comnena as a Historical Source”, A. P. Kazhdan being his research advisor. In 1965, Yakov Lyubarsky wins a contest to become a docent (Associate Professor) at the department of foreign languages of a Naval College in Leningrad. Later, he was appointed a head of the department of foreign languages at the Leningrad Agricultural Institute. He would hold this position for 20 years, while continuing his research and scholarship in the field of Byzantinology. In 1977, with a thesis “Michael Psellos, Personality and Writings” Lyubarsky received a doctorate from the Leningrad State University.

Throughout the 1970s and 1980s, Yakov Lyubarsky was regularly invited to lecture on Byzantium at the Leningrad University. However, his permanent appointment as a professor within the department of Modern Greek Philology of the Leningrad University became possible only in the 1990s, with the changes in the Russian political climate. With this career change, he was finally able to devote himself entirely to Byzantinology. Profound knowledge and love for the subjects he taught, wide experience as an educator, and Lyubarsky's casual and humorous manner (“non-puffed-up”, as he himself described it) won respect and appreciation among many of his students.

In the meantime, while his worldwide fame as a scholar continues to grow, he travels to international conferences of Byzantine Studies and lectures at the universities of Bulgaria, Italy, Greece, Crete and Cyprus, England, Spain, Germany, Denmark, Sweden, and Australia. He is also offered an opportunity to do research in Paris, Münster, and Dumbarton Oaks Research Library and Collection.

Lyubarsky died on November 30, 2003, and was buried near St. Petersburg in the Komarovo cemetery, where Anna Akhmatova, Dmitry Likhachov, and many other prominent figures in Russian science and culture were buried.

== Scientific Activity ==
Lyubarsky's first publication in the area of Byzantinology, an article about the Cretan poet Stephanos Sahlikis, appeared in 1959. It was followed a year later by a translation published in Greece that brought his first international recognition. His translation of the Alexiad by Anna Comnena was published in 1965. It was the first complete Russian edition of the historical account written by the Byzantine princess about the reign of her father, Emperor Alexios I Komnenos of Byzantium (1081–1118). Lyubarsky's version became canonical in the Russian context and was later reprinted twice. In an introduction to the first edition, Lyubarsky emphasized historical value of Alexiad, while the second edition was amended to include also his analysis of the literary structure of the book.

After Alexiad, Lyubarsky turned to Michael Psellos, a famous Byzantine philosopher, chronographer, and imperial advisor. Years of research of the philosopher's writings resulted, besides Lyubarsky's doctoral thesis, in a number of publications. These included a commented translation of Psellos’ Chronographia, a monograph “Michael Psellos. Personality and Writings. On the History of pre-Humanism in Byzantium”, and over a dozen of essays analyzing different aspects of Psellos’ works. A series of these essays discuss relationships between the philosopher and his contemporaries, thus offering us a view into spiritual, ethical, and everyday life of the Byzantine society in the 11th century. In contrast to existing stereotypes, Yakov Lyubarsky rediscovers Pselloes’ worth and significance, and emphasizes previously overlooked artistic value of his work. The comprehensive approach to the writings of Psellos allowed Lyubarsky to position the author within the context of not only Byzantine, but also medieval European literature. In his subsequent articles, Lyubarsky goes further in developing his ideas about evolution and specifics of Byzantine historiography (see, for example, his articles "Man in Byzantine Historiography from John Malala to Michail Psellos"; "Noue Tendenzen in der Erforschung der byzantinischen Historiographie"). This new approach is refined in Lyubarsky's third book “The Continuatio Theophanis”, in which the translation of the manuscript is accompanied by an article “Writings by the Continuatio Theophanis. Chronicle, History, Biographies.”

As such, Lyubarsky establishes a new concept in Byzantine studies that allows to consider the Byzantine historiography a literary phenomenon rather than just a collection of historic data. This leads to a possibility of applying certain methods of contemporary literary analysis to Byzantine literature. These ideas of Yakov Lyubarsky caused debates among scholars all over the world. One of these, initiated by Lyubarsky, was a discussion about narrative structures facilitated by Symbolae Osloenses, a Norwegian Journal of Greek and Latin Studies.

Lyubarsky's fourth book “Byzantine Historians and Writers” (1999) is a collection of his own essays published in Russia and abroad along with a bibliography of his works. The second edition of this book includes works that were not published previously or were published after his death, and a complete bibliography with over 170 titles.

The significance of Lyubarsky's works cannot be overstated. His highly regarded translations made previously unknown texts accessible to a Russian reader. His research offered a new perspective in the studies of Byzantine literature and a new direction in its interpretation, thus allowing to have a broader and less biased view of Byzantium.
