= Bryennios =

Byzantine noble family

Bryennios or Bryennius (Greek: Βρυέννιος), feminine form Bryennissa (Βρυέννισσα) or Bryennaina (Βρυένναινα), was the name of a noble Byzantine family which rose to prominence in the 11th and 12th centuries, mostly as military commanders. The etymology of the name is uncertain, although E. Trapp has claimed it derives from bryo; "to abound".

Bardanes Tourkos is known to have had a son named Bryennios or Bryenes (fl. 813), and the Bryennioi may have been descended from this man. The first definite member of the family appears 30 years after Bryennios Tourkos is known to have lived; Theoktistos Bryennios, who was appointed strategos of the Peloponnese in or soon after 842 and subsequently put down a revolt by the local Slavic tribes. No members of the family are known in the 10th century, but they reappear in the mid-to-late 11th century, when they rose to high military commands and became associated with the Komnenian dynasty. Members of the family retained high positions through the 12th century, and are documented up to the 15th century.

== Notable members ==
- Alexios Bryennios, megas doux in 1156
- Joseph Bryennios (c. 1350 – 1430), Byzantine monk and writer
- Manuel Bryennios (fl. 1300), Byzantine scholar
- Nikephoros Bryennios (ethnarch) (fl. 1050s), Byzantine general
- Nikephoros Bryennios the Elder (fl. 1070s), Byzantine general, son of the ethnarch, who made an attempt on the throne of Michael VII Doukas in 1077–1078
- Nikephoros Bryennios the Younger (1062–1137), son or grandson of the preceding, Byzantine general, statesman and historian, husband of Anna Komnene
- Theoktistos Bryennios, (fl. 842), strategos of the Peloponnese

== Sources ==
- Kazhdan, Alexander, ed. (1991), Oxford Dictionary of Byzantium, Oxford University Press, pp. 328–329, ISBN 978-0-19-504652-6
- Srđan Rajković (2003). Porodica Vrijenija u XI i XII stoleću. Vizantološki institut, Srpske akademije nauka i umetnosti. ISBN 978-86-83883-03-5.
