= Alexiad =

12th-century Byzantine history by Anna Komnene

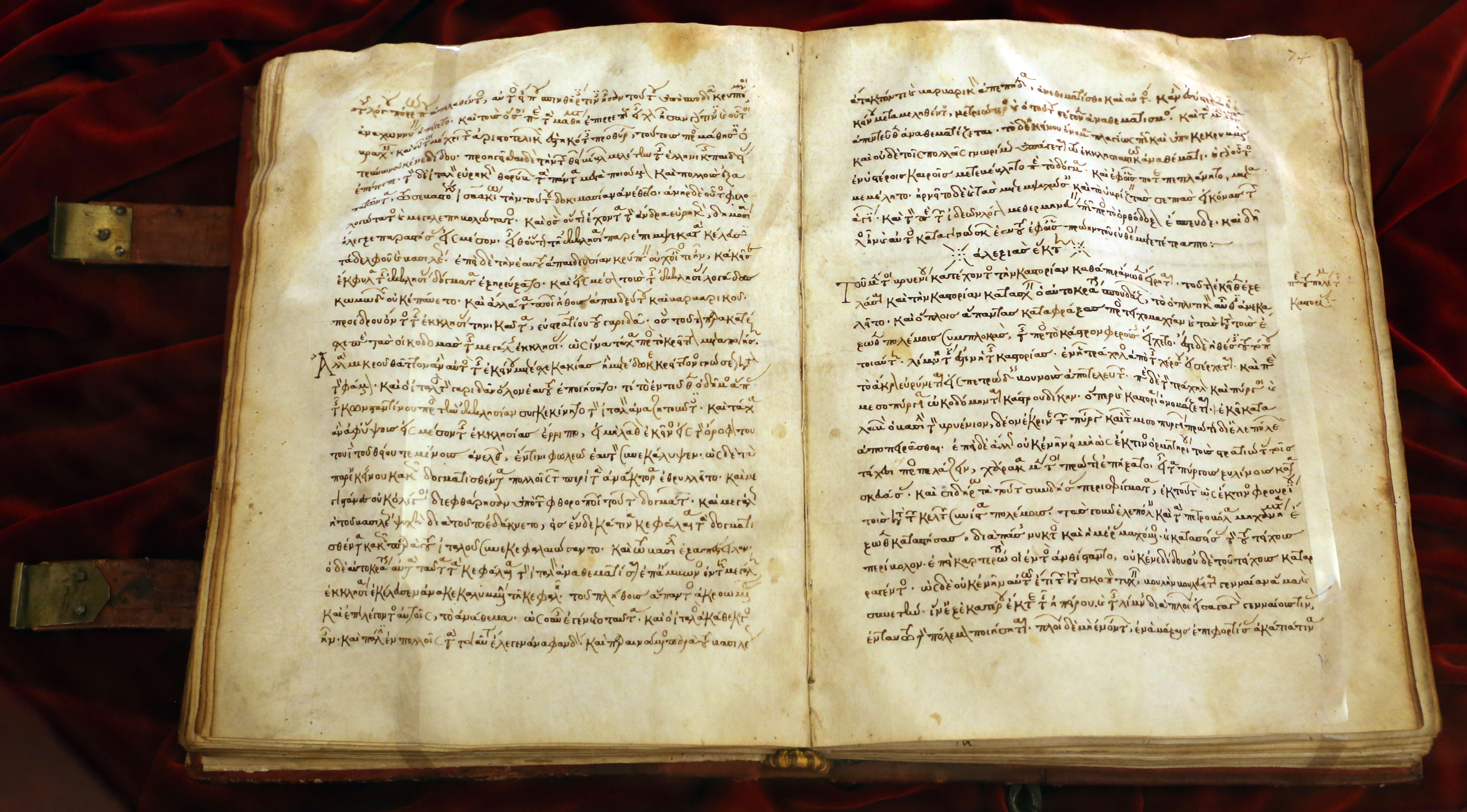
- 12th-century manuscript of the Alexiad in Biblioteca Medicea Laurenziana, Florence
- Author: Anna Komnene
- Original title: Ἀλεξιάς
- Language: Attic Greek
- Genre: Historiography, biography
- Publication place: Byzantine Empire

The Alexiad (Attic Greek: Ἀλεξιάς, romanized: Alexiás) is a medieval historical and biographical text written around the year 1148, by the Byzantine princess Anna Komnene, daughter of Emperor Alexios I Komnenos. It was written in a form of artificial Attic Greek, the literary dialect of classical Greece. Anna described the political and military history of the Byzantine Empire during the reign of her father, thus providing a significant account on the Byzantium of the High Middle Ages. Among other topics, the Alexiad documents the Byzantine Empire's interaction with the Crusades and highlights the conflicting perceptions of the East and West in the early 12th century. It does not mention the schism of 1054 – a topic which is very common in contemporary writing. It documents firsthand the decline of Byzantine cultural influence in eastern and western Europe, particularly in the West's increasing involvement in its geographic sphere. The Alexiad was paraphrased in vernacular medieval Greek in the mid-14th century to increase its readability, which testifies to the work's lasting interest.

== Structure ==
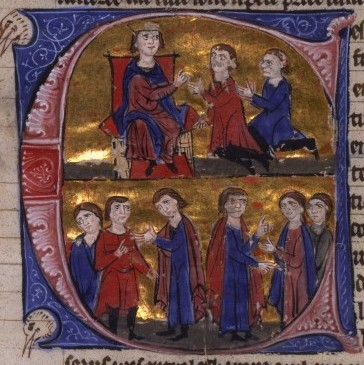
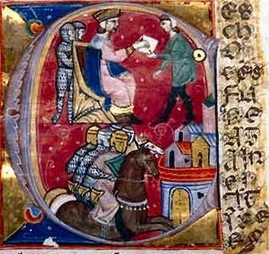
Alexios I Komnenos with Hugh the Great and the Crusaders Council, 13th century manuscript.

The book is divided into 15 books and a prologue. Its scope is limited to the duration of Alexios' reign, which it is thus able to depict in full detail, especially regarding political relations between the Byzantine Empire and western European powers.

1. Attacks against the Byzantine empire by the Normans, under their leader Robert Guiscard (Books 1–6):

Book 1 addresses Alexios' becoming general and Domestikos ton Scholon. It also discusses the Normans' preparation for their invasion. Book 2 addresses the Komnenian revolt. Book 3 addresses Alexios as Emperor (1081), the internal problems with Doukas family, and the Normans' crossing the Adriatic Sea. Book 4 addresses war against the Normans (1081–1082). Book 5 also addresses war against the Normans (1082–1083) and their first clash with the "heretics". Book 6 addresses the end of war against the Normans (1085) and the death of Robert Guiscard.

2. Byzantine relations with the Turks (Books 6–7, 9–10, and 14–15):

Book 7 addresses war against the Scythians (1087–1090). Book 9 addresses operations against Tzachas and the Dalmatians (1092–1094) and the conspiracy of Nicephorus Diogenes (1094). Book 10 addresses war against the Cumans and the beginning of the First Crusade (1094–1097). Book 14 addresses Turks, Franks, Cumans and Manicheans (1108–1115). Book 15 addresses the last expeditions — The Bogomils — Death of Alexios (1116–1118).

3. Pecheneg incursions on the northern Byzantine frontier (Books 7–8)

Book 8 addresses the end of the Scythian war (1091) and plots against the Emperor.

4. The First Crusade and Byzantine reactions to it (Books 10–11)

Book 11 also addresses the First Crusade (1097–1104).

5. Attacks on Byzantine frontiers by Robert Guiscard's son, Bohemond I of Antioch (Books 11–13)

Book 12 addresses domestic conflicts and the Norman preparation for their second invasion (1105–1107). Book 13 addresses Aaron's conspiracy and the second Norman invasion (1107–1108).

== Themes ==
The central focus of the Alexiad is the reign of Alexios Komnenos from 1081 to 1118. Anna presents an idealised portrait of her father's reign centering on his struggles with rivals such as Normans, Pechenegs, Turks, and the Latins of the First Crusade. While she acknowledges some of her father's faults and repeatedly emphasises her desire to achieve the objectivity suitable to a historian, Anna repeatedly praises him as a model ruler. His victories are credited to his guile and to divine support, while his defeats are usually softened by accounts of personal valor or of later success resulting from initial setbacks. He is often compared to figures from classical antiquity, with historians such as Leonora Neville emphasising how "the characterization of Alexios as wily sea captain steering the empire through constant storms with guile and courage strongly recalls Odysseus".

== Narrative style ==
The Alexiad was written in Greek in around 1148 and first edited by Possinus in 1651. Anna Komnene described herself in the text and openly acknowledges her feelings and opinions for some events, which goes against the typical format of historiography. She differed widely from Greek prose historians and because of this the book was initially well received; it was subjected to criticism later. The Alexiad interests many historians because Anna wrote it in a different format to the norm of the time. Anna Komnene is the only female Greek historiographer of her era and historians are keen to believe that her style of writing owes much to her being a woman. Despite including herself in the historiography and the other qualities that make her style vastly different from the typical historiography of the era, Anna Komnene's Alexiad has been seen as a "straightforward" history.

== Influences ==
Dates for the composition of the Alexiad range from the 1130s into the early 1150s, but scholars generally prefer a later composition since numerous aspects of the text seem to be critical of Manuel I Komnenos, who only took power in 1143. The Alexiad is an important source for the history of the First Crusade, but Anna wrote shortly after the Second Crusade's passage through Byzantine territory. She defended the actions of her father half a century earlier, likely in response to criticism of Alexios that sought to contrast the events to Manuel's more recent dealings with the crusaders. Similarly, her treatment of personages in the 1107-1108 Norman invasion by Bohemond makes indirect reference to the attack on the southern Balkans by Roger II in 1147. Clear parallels between the Alexiad and the Gesta Roberti Wiscardi, a Latin history of Robert Guiscard and the Normans in Italy up to the late 1090s, are indicative that Anna had access to either the text or notes by the author, but the precise chain of transmission is unclear. The relationship between the Alexiad and the work of John Zonaras is similarly not clear: John and Anna were writing at the same time and while it is possible that they saw drafts of the other's work, direct influences have been difficult to trace. The strong overlap in content between parts of the Alexiad and the Hyle Historia by Anna's husband Nikephoros Bryennios has been explained by the use of common materials as Anna directly disputes many of Bryennios’ ideas. The reception of Michael Psellos was important in the 1130s-1150s and Anna was part of the literary circle engaging with his works.

=== Bias ===
In her introduction, Anna Komnene stated her intention to record true events and to give an account of her father's deeds which "do not deserve to be consigned to forgetfulness". She is aware that in writing her father's history she may be accused of using panegyric language and often tries to remind the reader of her integrity as an impartial reporter of past events. Emphasis on Alexios as a "specifically Christian emperor", and a moral as well as politically laudable one, is pervasive. Peter Frankopan compares Alexios' treatment in the text to the techniques of the hagiographical tradition, while contrasting it with the negative portrait of or the absence of, his successors John II and Manuel I. Anna discussed the Latins (Normans and "Franks"), whom she described as barbarians. This distaste extends to the Turks and Armenians. The Alexiad also criticized John II Komnenos for his accession to the throne (in place of Anna herself) following Alexios' death. From a modern reader's point of view, the inconsistencies in the descriptions of military events and the Empire's misfortunes (partially due to these literary and especially Homeric influences) may seem exaggerated and stereotypical. Despite these issues, George Ostrogorsky emphasizes the importance of the Alexiad as a primary document.

== Questions of authorship ==
There has been some debate as to whether the Alexiad was in fact written by Anna Komnene. It is largely agreed that Anna Komnene was the author. Mentions in the text of her engagement, her role as a wife and the commentary on her female modesty that influences her writing make Anna's authorship of the Alexiad "unmistakable", according to some scholars. The predominance of military matters is argued to match Anna's choice to write history in the epic genre, reflecting the cultural influence of her family. She certainly could have written about military affairs, since she was able to accompany her father, the emperor, on military campaigns. She names her sources explicitly as "those who accompanied the emperor on campaign", as well as Alexios Komnenos and George Palaiologos, so that "[i]t is not necessary to imagine that she left out a reference to her most important source". Many scholars believe that the great detail about her father's home life and military style, combined with her experiences and mentions of femininity, provide a strong case for her authorship of the Alexiad.

The few passages in the text that can be identified as the author's subjective commentary, aside from emotionally charged references to her husband, hardly betray the author's gender or any other aspect of her background. This feature was seized on by James Howard-Johnston who argued, controversially, that the Alexiad could not have been written by a woman. Drawing attention to the extensive military sections of the Alexiad and suggesting that Anna was merely working from her husband's field notes, Howard-Johnston proposed to rename the work "Nicephoros's Alexiad". However, as Peter Frankopan pointed out, no comparable work by a woman survives from the Byzantine period and "there is no reason why this author should conform to a model set out by the reader" (i.e. to contemporary assumptions about gender).

=== Representations of emotion ===
Women of the aristocracy had more opportunities to pursue higher education, in comparison to those of humble origins, whose education was mainly learning to write and read, memorizing psalms and studying the scriptures. Some female aristocrats had an interest in literature and would be praised for their depth of knowledge by contemporary writers. Despite that, Komnene's high education and expertise in secular literature – the study of which was typically discouraged – remained exceptional.

In the Alexiad, Anna Komnene portrays the human condition with vivid imagery:

Orpheus, indeed, could move stones, trees, and all inanimate nature, by his singing; Timotheus, too, the flute-player, by piping an "orthian" tune to Alexander, incited the Macedonian thereby to snatch up his arms and sword; but the tale of my woes would not cause a movement in place, nor rouse men to arms and war, but they would move the hearer to tears, and compel sympathy from animate, and even inanimate, nature. Verily, my grief for my Cesar and his unexpected death have touched my inmost soul, and the wound has pierced to the profoundest depths of my being. All previous misfortunes compared with this insatiable calamity I count literally as a single small drop compared with this Atlantic Ocean, this turbulent Adriatic Sea of trouble: they were, methinks, but preludes to this, mere smoke and heat to forewarn me of this fiery furnace and indescribable blaze; the small daily sparks foretold this terrible conflagration. Oh! thou fire which, though unfed, dost reduce my heart to ashes! Thou burnest and art ever kept alight in secret, yet dost not consume. Though thou scorchest my heart thou givest me the outward semblance of being unburnt, though thy fingers of fire have gripped me even to the marrow of my bones, and to the dividing of my soul! However, I see that I have let my feelings carry me away from my subject, but the mention of my Caesar and my grief for him have instilled devastating sorrow into me.

Now I will wipe away my tears and recover myself from my sorrow and continue my task, and thus in the words of the tragedian: "I shall have double cause for tears, as a woman who in misfortune remembers former misfortune." To have as my object the publication of the life of so great and virtuous a King will be a reminder of his wondrous achievements, and these force me to shed warm tears, and the whole world will weep with me.

=== Writing style ===
Anna Komnene's unusual style is noteworthy in that it included a history of her father's actions during the First Crusade and her reactions to some of these events. Her opinions and commentary on particular events in an otherwise historical text have been assigned to her both positively and negatively. This interpretation of her histories is known as an "autobiographical history", meaning it is the history of Alexios and her own life in her style, which is not seen in male authors. While the English historian Edward Gibbon saw this "gendered" narrative to betray "in every page the vanity of a female author". Other scholars claim this style might be indicative of Anna's mentor, Michael Psellos. Some take this even further to suggest that Anna used Psellos' Chronographia as a model for her narration in her history and took his style even further, suggesting it was not her gender but her influences that led to her writing style.

Anna Komnene is considered unique for her time in the intensity by which she integrates her personal narrative yet does not focus on personal details. For some modern scholars it is an early example of inverted "gender roles", with a woman taking the lead of a story rather than the typical limitation as a quiet supporting role. Her style can be understood from her belief that intelligence and wisdom are far more important and so she does not view her history as overstepping gender roles, a view still finding agreement today: because, on the face of it, war, diplomacy and high politics have not been explicitly about [gendered] relationships, gender seems not to apply and so continues to be irrelevant to the thinking of historians.

== Manuscripts ==
Below is a list of manuscripts containing the complete work or its summary.

- Codex Coislinianus 311, in Fonds Coislin (Paris)
- Codex Florentinus 70,2
- Codex Vaticanus Graecus 1438
- Codex Barberinianus 235 & 236
- Codex Ottobonianus Graecus 131 & 137
- Codex Apographum Gronovii
- Codex Vaticanus Graecus 981 (prologue and summary)
- Codex Monacensis Graecus 355 (prologue and summary)
- Codex Parisinus Graecus 400 (prologue and summary)

== Published editions ==
=== Greek original ===
- Annae Comnenae Alexias, ed. Diether Reinsch (de) and Athanasios Kambylis (de) (2 vols., Berlin: De Gruyter, 2001) ISBN 3110158132 (vol. I: Prolegomena et Textus)

=== Translations ===
==== English ====
- The Alexiad of the Princess Anna Comnena: being the history of the reign of her father, Alexius I, Emperor of the Romans, 1081–1118 A.D., tr. Elizabeth Dawes (London: Kegan Paul, Trench, Trübner & Co., 1928) (Internet Medieval Sourcebook)
- The Alexiad, tr. Edgar Robert Ashton Sewter (Harmondsworth: Penguin, 1969) ISBN 9780140442151
  - revised by Peter Frankopan (London: Penguin, 2009) ISBN 9780140455274

==== Other ====
- French: Alexiade (règne de l'empereur Alexis I Comnène 1081-1118), ed. and tr. Bernard Leib, 3 vols., Paris: Les Belles Lettres, 1937–1945 (vol. I: Livres I-IV; vol. II: Livres V-X; vol. III: Livres XI-XV) (contains an edition of the Greek text no longer considered authoritative)
- Russian: Алексиада, tr. Yakov Lyubarsky (Moscow: Nauka, 1965)
- Polish: Aleksjada, tr. Oktawiusz Jurewicz (pl) (2 vols., Wrocław: Ossolineum, 1969–1972)
- Czech: Paměti byzantské princezny, tr. Růžena Dostálová (Praha: Odeon, 1996)
- Turkish: Alexiad. Malazgirt'in Sonrası, tr. Bilge Umar (Istanbul: İnkılâp, 1996) ISBN 9751011353
- German: Alexias, tr. Diether Reinsch (Cologne: DuMont, 1996)
- Italian: Alessiade, tr. Giacinto Agnello (Palermo: Palazzo Comitini edizioni, 2010) ISBN 978-88-967621-0-3
