= Leonora Neville =

Leonora Neville is the John W. and Jeanne M. Rowe Chair of Byzantine History in the Department of History at the University of Wisconsin-Madison. Her expertise extends to gender, religion, memory and history, primarily in the 9th-12th centuries CE. Her research explores the late antique and classical influences on medieval eastern Mediterranean cultures.

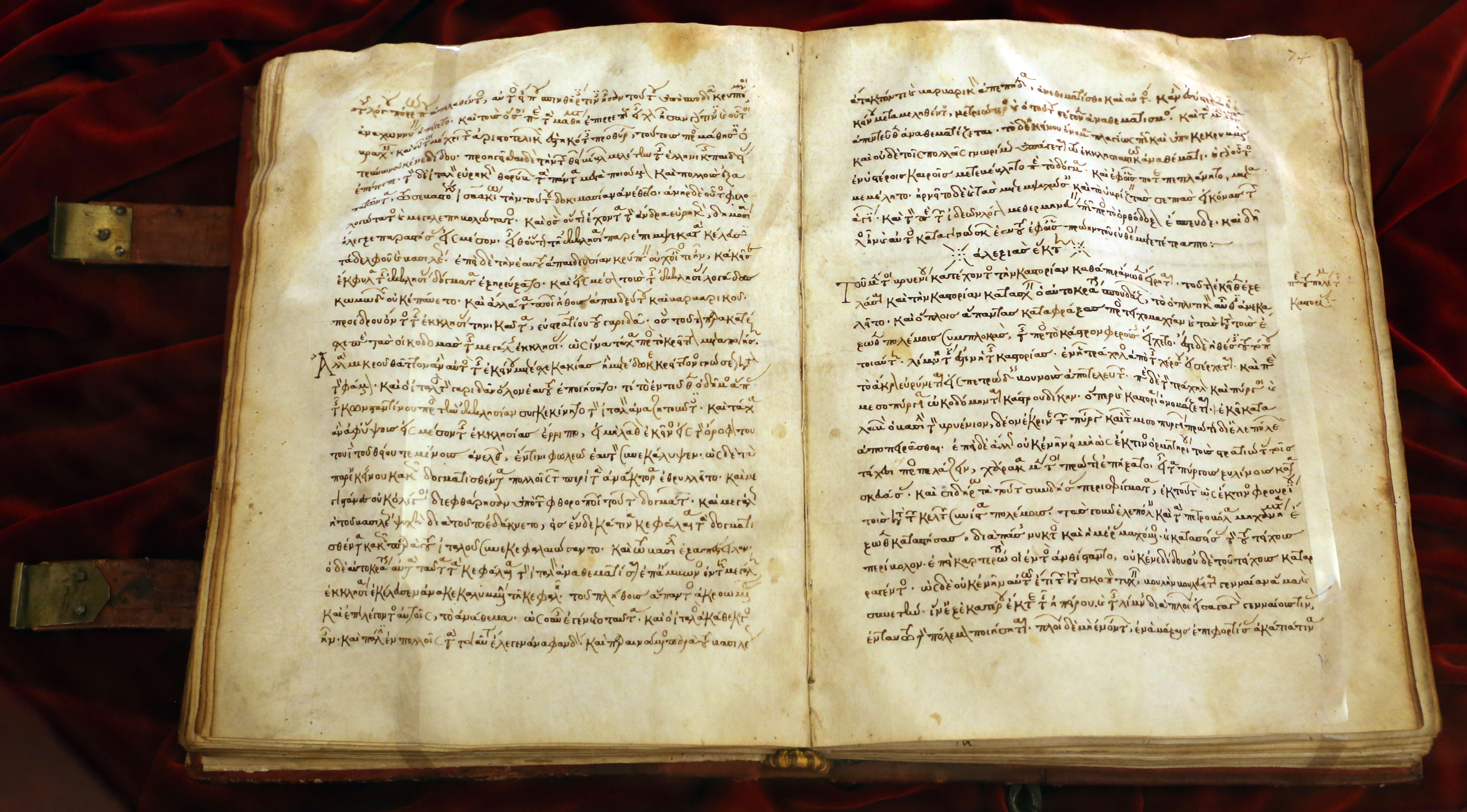
Anna Komnene's Alexiad (12th century manuscript, Laurentian Library)

== Education ==
Neville received her PhD in History from Princeton University in 1998. Her thesis was entitled Local Provincial Elites in Eleventh-Century Hellas and Peloponnese. Her doctoral supervisor was Judith Herrin. Neville was awarded a BA in History from Yale University in 1992.

== Research and career ==
From 1998-2010, Neville was Professor of History at the Catholic University of America, Washington DC. From 2010, she has held the Rowe Chair at University of Wisconsin-Madison.

Neville has published six books on Byzantine history. She is a Senior fellow at Dumbarton Oaks and an editor of several book series, including the Rethinking Byzantium series with Cambridge University Press and New Approaches to Byzantine History and Culture, published by Palgrave. She previously held a Dumbarton Oaks Junior Fellowship (1997-98) and the Dumbarton Oaks Bliss Prize Fellowship (1992-94). The Byzantine historian Alicia Walker situates Neville's work on Byzantine gender in a wider foundation context established by Alice-Mary Talbot, Angeliki Laiou, and Judith Herrin.

Neville's work to reconceive Anna Komnene (1083-1153 CE) as a Roman historian rather than the caricature of a woman 'ruthlessly plotting to seize power while lounging decadently in silk underwear' means that she routinely receives hate mail.

== Bibliography ==
- Sailing Away from Byzantium toward East Roman History, Cambridge Elements in Rethinking Byzantium (Cambridge: Cambridge University Press, 2025)
- Byzantine Gender, Arc Medieval Press: Amsterdam, Past Imperfect Series, 2019
- Guide to Byzantine Historical Writing (Cambridge: Cambridge University Press, 2018); Turkish translation by Süha Konuk, Bizans Tarihçileri ve Tarih Yazımı Rehberi, Selenge, 2021
- Anna Komnene: The Life and Work of a Medieval Historian (New York: Oxford University Press, Onassis Series in Hellenic Culture, 2016)
- Heroes and Romans in Twelfth-Century Byzantium: The Material for History of Nikephoros Bryennios (Cambridge University Press, 2012)
- Authority in Byzantine Provincial Society: 950-1100 (Cambridge: Cambridge University Press, 2004)
