= Pierre Poussines =

French Jesuit and scholar

Pierre Poussines (Latin: Petrus Possinus) (1609–1686) was a French Jesuit and scholar.

His works include the publication of Francis Xavier's Letters, in seven books, from 1667. He made editions of some classical authors, including Anna Comnena, and also a translation, Specimen Sapientiae Indorum Veterum (1666), of the Panchatantra.
