= Alicia Walker =

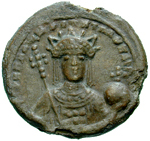
Byzantine lead seal of Eirene Doukaina, wife of Alexios I and daughter of Andronikos Doukas. Seal shows bust of Christ and bust of Eirene

Alicia Walker is Professor of History of Art at Bryn Mawr College. She is an expert on Medieval art from the ninth to the thirteenth centuries CE, and gender issues in the art and material culture of Byzantium.

== Education ==
Walker received her BA in art history from Bryn Mawr College in 1994. She completed her MA at Harvard University in 1998, and was awarded her PhD from Harvard University in 2004. Her doctoral thesis was entitled Exotic Elements in Middle Byzantine Secular Art and Aesthetics, 843-1204 C.E. Her PhD was supervised by Ioli Kalavrezou.

== Career and research ==
Walker has taught at Bryn Mawr since 2011. Before that she taught at Washington University in St Louis and Columbia University.

== Bibliography ==
- The Emperor and the World: Exotic Elements and the Imaging of Middle Byzantine Imperial Power, Ninth to Thirteenth Centuries (New York: Cambridge University Press, 2012)
- (With Heather Grossman) eds, Mechanisms of Exchange: Transmission, Scale, and Interaction in the Arts and Architecture of the Medieval Mediterranean, 1000- 1500, special issue of Medieval Encounters: Jewish, Christian and Muslim Culture in Confluence and Dialogue 18
- (With Amanda Luyster) eds, Negotiating Secular and Sacred in Medieval Art and Architecture. Christian, Islamic, Buddhist (Burlington, VT: Ashgate, 2009)
