= Tracy Barrett =

American author

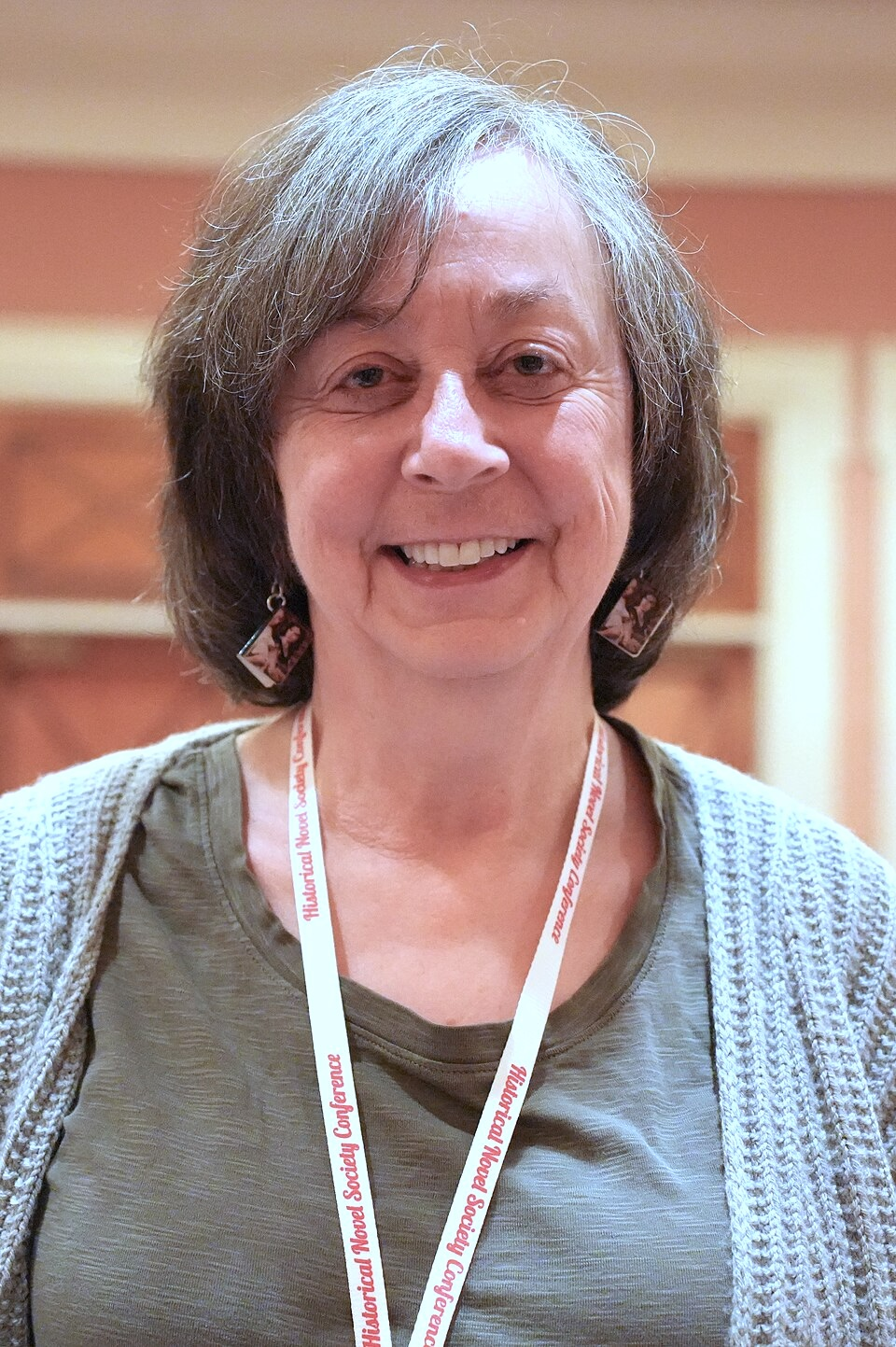
- Barrett in 2025
- Born: Cleveland, Ohio, U.S.
- Education: Brown University (BA) University of California, Berkeley (MA) (Ph.D)
- Occupations: Author, collegiate lecturer, researcher
- Writing career
- Period: 1999-present
- Genres: historical fiction, nonfiction, mystery, fantasy
- Notable works: Anna of Byzantium; The Sherlock Files
- Website: tracybarrett.com

Tracy Barrett is an American author of children’s books and young adult novels. She has published twenty-three books for young readers and one for adults.

== Early life and education ==
Tracy Barrett was born in Cleveland, Ohio, but grew up just outside New York City, New York. She holds a bachelor's degree in classics-archaeology from Brown University and a master's and PhD in Medieval Italian literature from the University of California, Berkeley.

== Career ==
Barrett served as a senior lecturer of Italian language and civilization at Vanderbilt University from 1984 to 2012.

Barrett is best known for her historical young adult novel, Anna of Byzantium, a fictionalized retelling of the life of Princess Anna Comnena in medieval Byzantium.

She is also the author of the Sherlock Files series, which follows the adventures of two young descendants of Holmes as they solve his cold cases.

== Selected works ==
- Anna of Byzantium, Laurel Leaf, 1999
- The Trail of Tears: An American Tragedy, Perfection Learning Corporation, 2000
- Cold in Summer, Henry Holt and Co., 2003
- On Etruscan Time, Henry Holt and Co., 2005
- King of Ithaka, Henry Holt and Co., 2010
- Dark of the Moon, Houghton Mifflin Harcourt, 2011
- The Stepsister's Tale, Harlequin Teen, 2014
- The Song of Orpheus, CreateSpace, 2016
- Marabel and the Book of Fate (Little, 2018)
- Freefall Summer, Charlesbridge Teen, 2018

=== The Sherlock Files ===
- The 100-Year-Old Secret, Henry Holt and Co., 2008
- The Beast of Blackslope, Henry Holt and Co., 2009
- The Case that Time Forgot, Henry Holt and Co., 2010
- The Missing Heir, Henry Holt and Co., 2011
