= Bilge Umar =

Turkish writer, researcher and jurist (1936–2023)

Bilge Umar (1936 – 8 July 2023) was a Turkish writer, researcher and jurist.

== Biography ==
Bilge Umar was born in Karşıyaka, İzmir, Turkey in 1936. He completed his studies at the Istanbul University Law School, where he also worked, after graduation in 1958, as an assistant. Umar received his doctorate degree in 1962, with a thesis entitled Annulment Suit under Turkish Enforcement-Bankruptcy Law, before becoming an associate professor in 1967. Then he moved back to İzmir and held various managerial posts in İzmir's Ege University, aside from his career as an academician. He became one of the founders of the university's Law School, where he became the deputy to the dean, and a full professor in 1970. Prof. Dr. Bilge Umar was the Head of the Department of Public Law of Yeditepe University (Istanbul) Faculty of Law and was teaching "Civil Procedure Law" and "Appeal Procedure and Arbitration".

As much as his studies in various legal matters, he came to be known in Turkey for his popular books on ancient history (particularly on ancient cities in Anatolia).

Bilge Umar died on 8 July 2023, at the age of 87.

== Books ==
- Aeolis / Bir Tarihsel Coğrafya Araştırması ve Gezi Rehberi (A historico-geographical research and a guidebook) ISBN 975-10-1714-9
- Bithynia / (A historico-geographical research and a guidebook), ISBN 975-10-2193-6
- Börklüce, ISBN 975-10-1970-2
- Ionia / (A historico-geographical research and a guidebook), ISBN 975-10-1604-5
- İlkçağda Türkiye Halkı (Prehistorical peoples in Turkey), ISBN 975-10-1426-3
- İzmir 1950-1999, ISBN 975-521-097-0
- İzmir'de Yunanlıların Son Günleri (Last days of Greeks in İzmir), 1974 Ankara, OCLC 2853264
- Karadeniz Kapadokyası Pontus (Pontus, the Cappadocia of the Black Sea), ISBN 975-10-1570-7
- Caria / (A historico-geographical research and a guidebook), ISBN 975-10-1465-4
- Cilicia / (A historico-geographical research and a guidebook), ISBN 975-10-1571-5
- Lydia / (A historico-geographical research and a guidebook), ISBN 975-10-1712-2
- Lykia / (A historico-geographical research and a guidebook), ISBN 975-10-1502-2
- Trakya (Thrace), ISBN 975-10-2008-5
- Troy / (A historico-geographical research and a guidebook), ISBN 975-10-1882-X
- Türkiye Halkının Ortaçağ Tarihi / Türkiye Türkleri Ulusunun Oluşması (History of the people of Turkey in the Middle Ages / Formation of a Turkish Nation in Turkey), ISBN 975-10-1225-2
- Türkiye'deki Tarihsel Adlar (Historical names around Turkey), ISBN 975-10-0539-6
- Türkiye'deki Tarihsel Anıtlar (Historical monuments around Turkey), ISBN 975-10-0846-8
- Yunanlıların ve Anadolu Rumlarının Anlatımıyla İzmir Savaşı (The war around İzmir as told by Greeks and Hellenic Anatolians), ISBN 975-10-1826-9
- Ege'nin Kapadokyası Bafa Gölü (Lake Bafa, the Cappadocia of the Aegean Region)

== Translations ==
- Niebelungerlied, Les chansons de Roland, Alexiades, and other.
