= Anna of Constantinople =

Anna of Constantinople may refer to:

- Anna of Constantinople (daughter of Leo VI) (888–912), daughter of Leo VI the Wise, and wife of Louis the Blind
- Anna Porphyrogenita (963–1011), sister of Basil II, and wife of Vladimir the Great
