= Růžena Dostálová =

Czech philologist and historian

- Born: 22 April 1924; Bratislava. Czechoslovakia
- Died: 18 August 2014 (aged 90); Prague
- Occupations: Historian , philologist
- Known for: Byzantine Education

Růžena Dostálová (22 April 1924 – 18 August 2014) was a Czech philologist, historian, literary historian, translator and leading Byzantine scholar.

== Life and education ==
Dostálová was born in Bratislava on 22 April 1924. Between 1945 and 1950, Dostálová studied classical philology at the Faculty of Arts of the Charles University, studying modern Greek from 1949 until 1952. In 1952, at the same university, she defended her dissertation on the Greek novel about Nino on papyrus fragments and was awarded the title of PhDr. In 1959, she was awarded a CSc.

Dostálová died in Prague on 18 August 2014.

== Career ==
After university, Dostálová worked at the Czechoslovak Academy of Sciences. In 1993, she researched Byzantine and Modern Greek philology for her habilitation at Charles University, and in 1996 she was appointed associate professor in the field of classical philology. As an author and editor she translated Byzantine literature, and wrote the Byzantine and Greek chapters of the Slovnik řeckých spisovatelů (Dictionary of Greek Writers). She is the author of the monograph Byzantine Education (published in 1990).

Dostálová lectured externally at Charles University in Prague and Masaryk University in Brno.

== Publications ==
- Byzantská vzdělanost (Byzantine Education) Prague: Vyšehrad, 1990. 415 pp. ISBN 80-7021-034-6. 2nd ed. Prague: Vyšehrad, 2003. 413 pp. ISBN 80-7021-409-0
- Il romanzo greco e i papiri (The Greek Novel and Papyri) Prague: Charles University, 1991. 103 pp. ISBN 80-7066-348-0
- Antická mystéria (Ancient Mysteries) Prague: Vyšehrad, 1997. 365 pp. ISBN 80-7021-217-9 (co-author Radislav Hošek)
- Základní kurz novořeckého jazyka (Basic course of the modern Greek language) Brno: Masaryk University, 2000. 490 pp. ISBN 80-210-2395-3. 3rd ed. Prague: Set out, 2008. 498 pp. ISBN 978-80-86277-65-3
- Řecko (Greece) Prague: Libri, 2002. 146 pp. ISBN 80-7277-110-8
- Geografie a mýty v Dionysiakách Nonna z Panopole (Geography and Myths in the Dionysiacs of Nonna of Panopole) Červený Kostelec: Pavel Mervart, 2009. 202 pp. ISBN 978-80-86818-96-2

== Achievements ==
- 2004 – Gold Medal of the Society of Greek Translators of Fine Literature (Athens)
- 2004 – UK Medal on the occasion of the 85th anniversary of ETF UK
- 2010 – State award of the Hellenic Republic 'Commandeur de l'Ordre du Phénix' , for lifetime work, presented by the Ambassador of Greece to the Czech Republic Constantinos Kokossis
- 2011 – Medal of the Learned Society of the Czech Republic

== Bibliography ==
- "Bibliografi e Růženy Dostálové" (PDF). Digitální knihovna Filozofické fakulty Masarykovy univerzity (in Czech). Brno: Masaryk University.
