= Diether Roderich Reinsch =

Diether Roderich Reinsch (born 11 February 1940) is a German Byzantinist and university professor, emeritus of the Free University of Berlin.

== Biography ==
Born in Breslau, he graduated from high school in Wuppertal and studied Classics and Byzantine studies in the universities of Cologne, Tübingen and Athens (with a scholarship in 1962/1963). He graduated in 1967 from the Free University of Berlin, specializing in Byzantine studies in 1974 and beginning to work at the Aristoteles-Archiv. In 1981 he obtained his habilitation with a thesis on the Histories of Kritoboulos of Imbros.

In 1986 he was nominated Professor of Byzantine philology and Modern Greek Studies at the University of Bochum, moving to the Free University of Berlin in 1993. He retired in 2005.

Reinsch mostly studied Byzantine prose and rhetoric, specializing in Byzantine historiography; he published critical editions of the Histories of Kritobulos (Critobulus Imbriota 1983), of Anna Komnene's Alexias (Anna Comnena 2001), of Michael Psellos's Chronographia and of Dukas's historiographical work (Michael Psellus 2014; Dukas 2020).

== Works (selection) ==
- Reinsch, Diether Roderich (1974). Die Briefe des Matthaios von Ephesos im Codex Vindobonensis Gr. 174. Berlin: Mielke.
- Harlfinger, Dieter; Moraux, Paul; Reinsch, Diether Roderich; Wiesner, Jürgen (1976). Aristoteles Graecus. Die griechischen Manuskripte des Aristoteles. Peripatoi, 8. Vol. I: Alexandrien–London. Berlin – Boston: Walter de Gruyter. ISBN 3-11-085287-X.
- Critobulus Imbriota (1983). Reinsch, Diether Roderich (ed.). Historiae. Corpus Fontium Historiae Byzantinae, 22 (Series Berolinensis). Berlin – Boston: Walter de Gruyter. ISBN 3-11-008969-6.
- Anna Comnena (2001). Kambylis, Athanasios; Reinsch, Diether Roderich (eds.). Alexias. Corpus Fontium Historiae Byzantinae, 40 (Series Berolinensis). Vol. I–II. Berlin – Boston: Walter de Gruyter. ISBN 3-11-015813-2.
- Michael Psellus (2014). Reinsch, Diether Roderich (ed.). Chronographia. Millennium-Studien, 51. Vol. I–II. Berlin – Boston: Walter de Gruyter. ISBN 978-3-11-034548-3.
- Dukas (2020). Reinsch, Diether Roderich; Reinsch–Werner, Ljuba H. (eds.). Chronographia. Byzantiner und Osmanen im Kampf um die Macht und das Überleben (1341–1462). Sammlung Tusculum. Berlin – Boston: Walter de Gruyter. ISBN 978-3-11-069764-3.
