= Alexios Komnenos (megas doux) =

Byzantine military commander

Alexios Komnenos was a Byzantine aristocrat and military commander in the mid-12th century.

== Life ==
Born around 1102, Alexios was the first son of Anna Komnene, the eldest daughter of Emperor Alexios I Komnenos (r. 1081–1118), and of the general and historian Nikephoros Bryennios the Younger. In 1118 he was betrothed Kata, a daughter of King David IV of Georgia. Their wedding took place in 1122.

At some unknown time, Alexios was appointed governor (praitor) of the joint provinces of Hellas and the Peloponnese, corresponding to southern mainland Greece. Writing in 1201/2, the Archbishop of Athens, Michael Choniates, reported that he was remembered among the locals for his kindness and justice. In 1147, Alexios participated in the Council of Blachernae that deposed Patriarch Cosmas II of Constantinople.

In early 1156 Alexios received from his cousin, Manuel I Komnenos (r. 1143–1180) the high rank of megas doux, placing him in nominal command over the entire Byzantine navy. In the same year he was sent to join John Doukas in Apulia against the Italo-Normans of the Kingdom of Sicily; he brought his fleet to Bari, but not the much-needed troops. Shortly after, the Byzantine commanders were defeated at both land and sea and captured by King William I of Sicily on 28 May 1156. The near contemporary historian John Kinnamos squarely blames both Alexios and Doukas for not being prudent enough to avoid a direct confrontation, and further for spoiling the subsequent expedition by Alexios Axouch by making, while in captivity, concessions to King William to secure their rapid release, but the historian's views may be tainted by later events.

Alexios was released after Manuel concluded peace with the Normans in 1158. He is last mentioned in 1161, as the head of an embassy sent to the Principality of Antioch to accompany Manuel I's second wife, Maria of Antioch, to Constantinople. While at Antioch, Alexios had the unpleasant task of informing King Baldwin III of Jerusalem, who had pushed for a betrothal between Manuel and Melisende of Tripoli, that the Emperor had rejected that match. Alexios probably died by 1167, when Andronikos Kontostephanos was named megas doux. Alexios was one of the Komnenoi listed in the typikon of the Monastery of Christ Philanthropos; from his commemoration, it is known that he died either on March 30 or 31.

== Family ==
From his marriage with Kata, Alexios had at least two sons, David and Andronikos. Kata and the two sons are mentioned in the context of the 1185 sack of Thessalonica by the Normans, during which David was the city's governor. His dismal conduct during the siege led to them all being imprisoned. Although they were released after the fall of Andronikos I Komnenos (r. 1183–1185), according to Michael Choniates, in 1201/2 no descendants of Alexios were still alive.

== Sources ==
- Birkenmeier, John W. (2002). The Development of the Komnenian Army: 1081–1180. Leiden: Brill. ISBN 90-04-11710-5.
- Guilland, Rodolphe (1967). "Le Drongaire de la flotte, le Grand drongaire de la flotte, le Duc de la flotte, le Mégaduc". Recherches sur les institutions byzantines [Studies on the Byzantine Institutions]. Berliner byzantinische Arbeiten 35 (in French). Vol. I. Berlin and Amsterdam: Akademie-Verlag & Adolf M. Hakkert. pp. 535–562. OCLC 878894516.
- Kouroupou, Matoula; Vannier, Jean-François (2005). "Commémoraisons des Comnènes dans le typikon liturgique du monastère du Christ Philanthrope (ms. Panaghia Kamariotissa 29)" [Commemorations of the Komnenoi in the liturgical typikon of the Monastery of Christ Philanthropos (ms. Panaghia Kamariotissa 29)]. Revue des études byzantines (in French). 63: 41–69. doi:10.3406/rebyz.2005.2305.
- Magdalino, Paul (2002) [1993]. The Empire of Manuel I Komnenos, 1143–1180 (Second ed.). Cambridge: Cambridge University Press. ISBN 9780521526531.
- Varzos, Konstantinos (1984). Η Γενεαλογία των Κομνηνών [The Genealogy of the Komnenoi] (PDF) (in Greek). Vol. A1. Thessaloniki: Centre for Byzantine Studies, University of Thessaloniki.
