= Ioli Kalavrezou =

Art historian

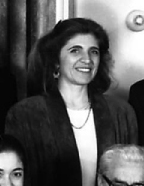
- Kalavrezou in 1992

Academic work
- Discipline: Art History
- Sub-discipline: Byzantine
- Institutions: University of California, Los Angeles, LMU Munich, Harvard University

Ioli Kalavrezou is Dumbarton Oaks Professor of Byzantine Art at Harvard University. Her research focuses on early Christian and Byzantine art.

== Career ==
Prior to joining Harvard, Kalavrezou taught at UCLA and at LMU Munich.

== "Byzantine Women" Exhibition ==
In 2002, Kalavrezou curated an exhibit at the Arthur M. Sackler Museum at Harvard called "Byzantine Women and their World," Unlike previous exhibitions focused on the high art of the Byzantine court and church, this exhibit examine the daily lives of "unexceptional" Byzantine women, challenging the notion that their existence was powerless. The culmination of a graduate seminar, the exhibit was broad in both geographic and temporal scope: its 186 objects spanned the full range of the Byzantine empire, from the fourth to the sixteenth centuries and including Italy, North Africa, the Balkans, Asia Minor, and the Holy Land. The accompanying catalogue pictures most of the exhibit's objects in color and accompanying essay, many written by students. These and the introductory essays serve a dual purpose, both the traditional function of an art catalogue as well as shedding light on the history of Byzantine women.

== Books ==
- Byzantine women and their world (2003) ISBN 9780300096989, OCLC 876738221
- Byzantine icons in steatite (1985) OCLC 888670192
- Steatite carvings of the middle Byzantine Period (1977) OCLC 633633083
