= Nikephoros Bryennios the Younger =

Byzantine general, statesman and historian (1062/82–1137)

Nikephoros Byrennios
- Kaisar
- Born: c. 1060/80; Adrianople
- Died: 1137; Constantinople
- Spouse: Anna Komnene
- Issue: Alexios Komnenos; John Doukas
- House: Bryennios
- Father: Nikephoros Bryennios the Elder(?)

Nikephoros Bryennios (or Nicephorus Bryennius; Greek: Νικηφόρος Βρυέννιος, Nikēphoros Bryennios; c. 1060 or 1080–1137) was a Byzantine general, statesman and historian. He was born at Orestias (Adrianople) in the theme of Macedonia.

== Life ==
The Bryennios family were prominent in the city of Adrianople where they were locally powerful. His father (or possibly grandfather), of the same name, the governor of the theme of Dyrrhachium, had revolted against the feeble Michael VII, but had been defeated by the future Emperor Alexios I Komnenos. The son, who was distinguished for his learning, personal beauty, and engaging qualities, gained the favour of Alexios I and the hand of his daughter Anna Komnene, receiving the titles of Caesar and panhypersebastos (one of the new dignities introduced by Alexios). The marriage of Nikephoros the Younger was probably arranged during the Cuman War of 1094, when Alexios needed the support of the Bryennios family and their abilities to mobilise the military potential of Thrace. The marriage took place two years later.

Bryennios successfully defended the walls of Constantinople against the attacks of Godfrey of Bouillon during the First Crusade (1097). This was more of a demonstration than a serious conflict, as the Byzantine defenders were ordered to shoot the Crusaders' horses, to avoid killing Christians on a holy day. He conducted the peace negotiations between Alexios and Prince Bohemond I of Antioch resulting in the Treaty of Devol of 1108. Bryennios played an important part in the defeat of Melikshah, the Seljuq Sultan of Rûm, at the Battle of Philomelion (1116), where he led a cavalry charge which almost captured the Sultan.

After the death of Alexios, he refused to enter into the conspiracy set afoot by his mother-in-law Irene Doukaina and his wife Anna to depose John II Komnenos, the son of Alexios, and raise him to the throne. His wife attributed his refusal to cowardice, but it seems from certain passages in his own work that he really regarded it as a crime to revolt against the rightful heir; the only reproach that can be brought against him is that he did not nip the conspiracy in the bud. He was on very friendly terms with the new emperor, John II, whom he accompanied, as a senior commander, on his repeated Anatolian campaigns. During the Syrian campaign (1137), he became ill and was forced to return to Constantinople, where he died in the same year.

== Birth date dispute ==
There is a dispute regarding Nikephoros Bryennios' birth date, due to disagreements on whether he was the son or grandson of Nikephoros Bryennios the Elder. If he was his son, his date of birth would be around 1060. If he was his grandson, around 1080.

The third edition of the Tusculum Lexikon, in contrast to earlier editions, moved to the grandson view. Other works, such as the Lexikon des Mittelalters and the Dictionary of the Middle Ages left the question open, as they consider that there is insufficient evidence on the subject.

Historian Diether Roderich Reinsch, in an article about the birth date dispute published by Byzantinische Zeitschrift, wrote that Bryennios the Younger was the grandson of Bryennios the Elder. He notes that if Bryennios married Anna Komnene in 1097, when she was fourteen years old, he must have been around seventeen. He supports this argument by noting that Georgios Tornikes called Bryennios a παῖς, a word meaning "youth", which wouldn't have been used for a man in his mid-thirties, but was perfectly normal for a young man.

== Family ==
By his wife Anna Komnene, the Caesar Nikephoros Bryennios had several children, including:

1. Alexios Komnenos, megas doux, c. 1102–c. 1161/1167
2. John Doukas, c. 1103–after 1173
3. Eirene Doukaina, c. 1105– after 1155
4. Maria Bryennaina Komnene, c. 1107–?

== Writings ==
At the suggestion of his mother-in-law, he wrote a history ("Material for a History", Greek: Ὕλη Ἱστορίας or Ὕλη Ἱστοριῶν) of the period from 1057 to 1081, from the victory of Isaac I Komnenos over Michael VI to the dethronement of Nikephoros III Botaneiates by Alexios I. The work has been described as a family chronicle rather than a history, the object of which was the glorification of the house of Komnenos. Part of the introduction is probably a later addition.

In addition to information derived from older contemporaries (such as his father and father-in-law), Bryennios made use of the works of Michael Psellos, John Skylitzes and Michael Attaleiates. As might be expected, his views are biased by personal considerations and his intimacy with the royal family, which at the same time, however, afforded him unusual facilities for obtaining material. His model was Xenophon, whom he imitated with a tolerable measure of success; he abstained from an excessive use of simile and metaphor, and his style was concise and simple. He has also been credited with drawing inspiration from the Greek historians of Republican Rome. He died in 1137 before finishing the work. The extent to which his wife's history, The Alexiad, draws on the second volume of Bryennios' work, is moot.

== Editions ==
- Editio princeps published by Petrus Possinus in 1661.
- Migne, Patrologia Graeca, cxxvii.
- A. Meineke (with du Cange's commentary), Corpus Scriptorum Historiae Byzantinae, Bonn, 1836. (available online)
- P. Gautier (with French translation), Corpus Fontium Historiae Byzantinae 9, Brussels, 1975.

== Bibliography ==
- Angold, Michael (1984). The Byzantine Empire, 1025–1204: A Political History. London, United Kingdom: Longman. ISBN 9780582294684.
- Chisholm, Hugh, ed. (1911). "Bryennius, Nicephorus". Encyclopædia Britannica. Vol. 4 (11th ed.). Cambridge University Press. pp. 699–700.
- Jeffreys, E. (2016) "Literary Trends in the Constantinopolitan Courts", in John II Komnenos, Emperor of Byzantium: In the Shadow of Father and Son, Bucossi, A. and Suarez, A. R. (eds.), pp. 110–120, Routledge, Abingdon and New York. ISBN 978-1-4724-6024-0
- Komnene (Comnena), Anna; Sewter, Edgar Robert Ashton (1969). The Alexiad of Anna Comnena translated by Edgar Robert Ashton Sewter. Penguin Classics. ISBN 0-14-044215-4.
- Kazhdan, Alexander, ed. (1991). The Oxford Dictionary of Byzantium. Oxford and New York: Oxford University Press. ISBN 0-19-504652-8.
- Varzos, Konstantinos (1984). Η Γενεαλογία των Κομνηνών [The Genealogy of the Komnenoi] (PDF) (in Greek). Vol. A1. Thessaloniki: Centre for Byzantine Studies, University of Thessaloniki.

Attribution:
