= Anna Komnene =

Byzantine historian (1083–1153)

- Kaisarissa
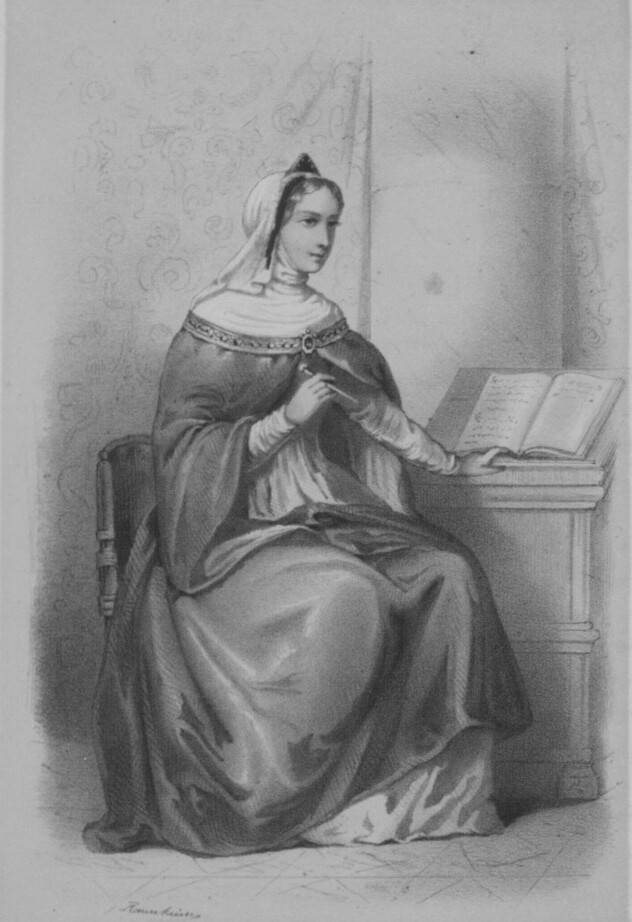
- "Anna Komnene" by Ctesse Drohojowska (1852)
- Born: 1 December 1083; Porphyra Chamber, Great Palace of Constantinople, Byzantine Empire (modern-day Istanbul, Turkey)
- Died: 1153 (aged 69–70); Kecharitomene Monastery, Constantinople, Byzantine Empire (modern-day Istanbul, Turkey)
- Spouse: Constantine Doukas; Nikephoros Bryennios the Younger
- Issue: Alexios Komnenos; John Doukas; Irene Doukaina; Maria Bryennaina Komnene
- House: House of Komnenos
- Father: Alexios I Komnenos
- Mother: Irene Doukaina

Anna Komnene (Greek: Ἄννα Κομνηνή, romanized: Ánna Komnēnḗ; 1 December 1083 – 1153), commonly Latinized as Anna Comnena, was a Byzantine Greek princess and historian. She is the author of the Alexiad, an account of the reign of her father, Byzantine emperor Alexios I Komnenos. Her work constitutes the most important primary source of Byzantine history of the late 11th and early 12th centuries, as well as of the early Crusades. Although she is best known as the author of the Alexiad, Anna played an important part in the politics of the time and attempted to depose her brother John II Komnenos as emperor in favour of her husband, Nikephoros Bryennios the Younger.

At birth, Anna was betrothed to Constantine Doukas, and she grew up in his mother's household. She was well educated in "Greek literature and history, philosophy, theology, mathematics and medicine." Anna and Constantine were next in the line to throne until Anna's younger brother, John II Komnenos, became the heir in 1092. Constantine died around 1094, and Anna married Nikephoros Bryennios in 1097. The two had several children before Nikephoros' death around 1136.

It is commonly believed that, following her father's death in 1118, Anna and her mother attempted to usurp John II Komnenos. Supposedly her husband refused to cooperate with them, and the usurpation failed. As a result, John exiled Anna to the Kecharitomene Monastery, where she spent the rest of her life, and in her confinement there she wrote the Alexiad. However, there is no contemporary evidence of Anna's involvement in any assassination attempt.

== Early life and family ==
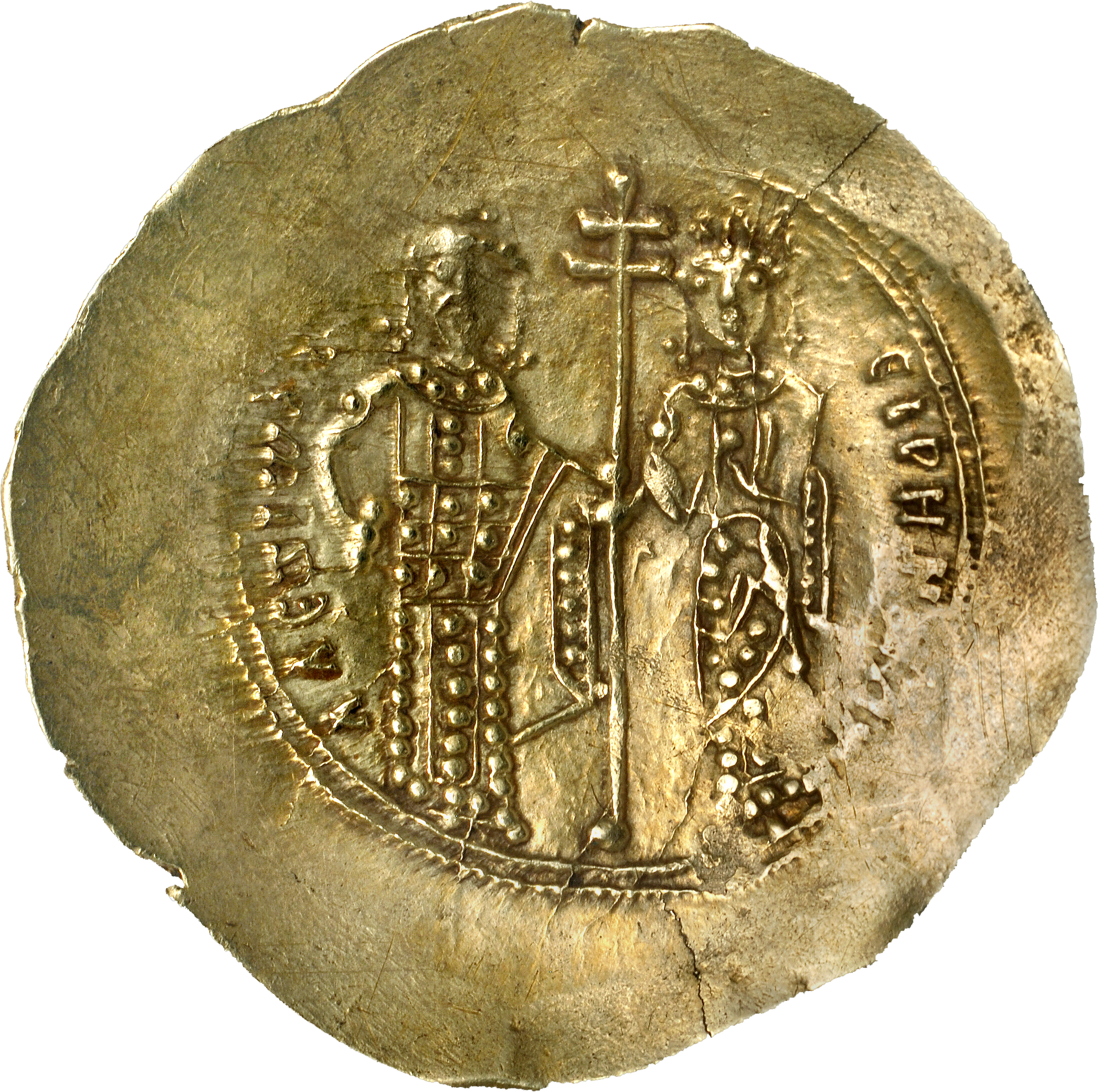
Byzantine coin depicting emperor Alexios I Komnenos and Irene Doukaina, parents of Anna Komnene, 11th century.

Anna was born on 1 December 1083 to Alexios I Komnenos and Irene Doukaina. Her father, Alexios I Komnenos, became emperor in 1081, after usurping the previous Byzantine Emperor, Nikephoros Botaneiates. Her mother, Irene Doukaina, was part of the imperial Doukas family. In the Alexiad, Anna emphasises her affection for her parents in stating her relationship to Alexios and Irene. She was the eldest of seven children; her younger siblings were (in order) Maria, John II, Andronikos, Isaac, Eudokia and Theodora.

Anna was born in the Porphyra Chamber of the imperial palace in Constantinople, making her a porphyrogenita, which underscored her imperial status. She noted this status in the Alexiad, stating that she was "born and bred in the purple." According to Anna's description in the Alexiad, her mother asked Anna to wait to be born until her father returned from war. Obediently, Anna waited until her father came home.

At birth, Anna was betrothed to Constantine Doukas, the son of Emperor Michael VII and Maria of Alania. The two were the heirs to the empire until sometime between c.1088 and 1092, after the birth of Anna's brother, John II Komnenos. Various scholars point out that the betrothal was probably a political match intended to establish the legitimacy of Anna's father, who had usurped the previous emperor.

Starting around 1090, Constantine's mother—Maria of Alania—raised Anna in her home. It was common in Byzantium for mothers-in-law to raise daughters-in-law. In 1094, Maria of Alania was implicated in an attempt to overthrow Alexios I Komnenos. Some scholars argue that Anna's betrothal to Constantine Doukas may not have ended there, as he was not implicated in the plot against Alexios, but it certainly ended when he died around 1094.

Anna's relationships to her mother-in-law Maria of Alania, her paternal grandmother Anna Dalassene, and her mother Irene Doukaina, have been noted as sources of inspiration and admiration for Anna. For example, Thalia Gouma-Peterson argues that Irene Doukaina's "maternal ability to deal with the speculative and the intellectual enables the daughter to become the highly accomplished scholar she proudly claims to be in the opening pages of the Alexiad."

== Education ==
Anna wrote at the beginning of the Alexiad about her education, highlighting her experience with literature, Greek language, rhetoric and sciences. Tutors trained her in subjects that included astronomy, medicine, history, military affairs, geography and mathematics. Anna was noted for her education by the medieval scholar, Niketas Choniates, who wrote that Anna "was ardently devoted to philosophy, the queen of all sciences, and was educated in every field." Anna's conception of her education is shown in her testament, which credited her parents for allowing her to obtain an education. This testament is in contrast to a funeral oration about Anna given by her contemporary, Georgios Tornikes. In his oration he said that she had to read ancient poetry, such as the Odyssey, in secret because her parents disapproved of its dealing with polytheism and other "dangerous exploits," which were considered "dangerous" for men and "excessively insidious" for women. Tornikes went on to say that Anna "braced the weakness of her soul" and studied the poetry "taking care not to be detected by her parents."

Anna proved to be capable not only on an intellectual level but also in practical matters. She gained considerable expertise in medicine through studying medical texts and treating her family and members of her household, and she worked with her father's physicians to treat him during his final illness. She was an expert on gout, and administered a huge hospital in Constantinople.

== Marriage ==
In roughly 1097, Anna's parents married her to Caesar Nikephoros Bryennios, a member of the Bryennios family that had held the throne before the accession of Anna's father, Alexios I. Nikephoros was a soldier and a historian.

Most scholars agree that the marriage was a political one—it created legitimacy for Anna's paternal family through Bryennios' connections to a past emperor's family. The two were an intellectual couple, and Nikephoros Bryennios tolerated and possibly encouraged Anna's scholarly interests by allowing her to participate in various scholarly circles. The couple had several children, of which many died in infancy. Of them the names of six are known: Eirene, Maria, Alexios, John, Andronikos and Constantine. Only Eirene, Maria, John and Alexios survived to adulthood.

== Claim to the throne ==
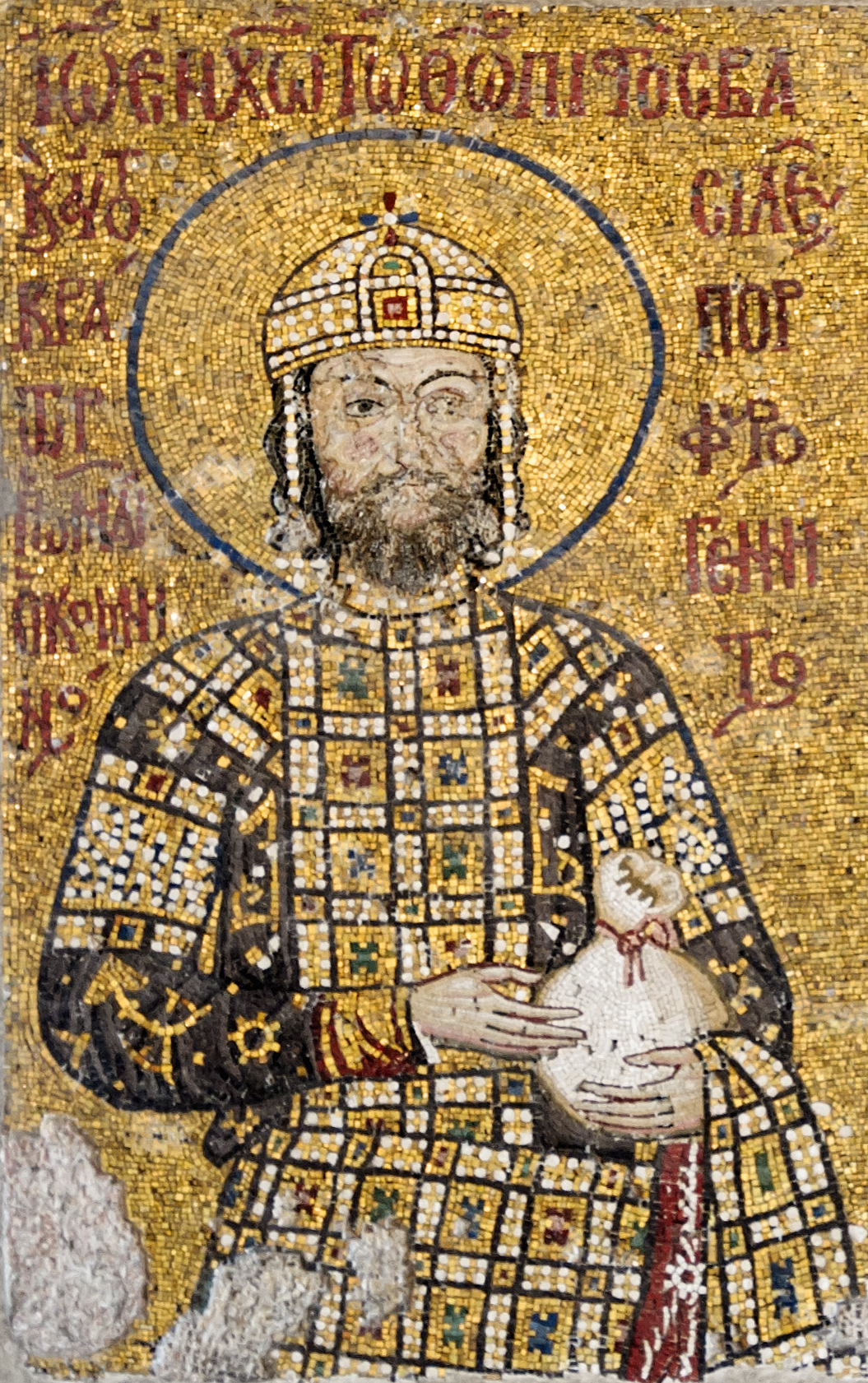
John II, Anna's brother and Alexios I's successor to the imperial throne.

In 1087, Anna's brother, John II, was born. Several years after his birth, in 1092, John was designated emperor. According to Choniates, Emperor Alexios "favoured" John and declared him emperor while the Empress Irene "threw her full influence on [Anna's] side" and "continually attempted" to persuade the emperor to designate Nikephoros Bryennios, Anna's husband, in John's place. Around 1112, Alexios fell sick with rheumatism and could not move. He therefore turned the civil government over to his wife, Irene; she in turn directed the administration to Bryennios. Choniates states that, as Emperor Alexios lay dying in his imperial bedchamber, John arrived and "secretly" took the emperor's ring from his father during an embrace "as though in mourning." Anna also worked in her husband's favour during her father's illness. In 1118, Alexios I Komnenos died. A cleric acclaimed John emperor in Hagia Sophia.

According to Dion C. Smythe, Anna "felt cheated" because she "should have inherited." Indeed, according to Anna Komnene in the Alexiad, at her birth she was presented with "a crown and imperial diadem." Anna's "main aim" in the depiction of events in the Alexiad, according to Vlada Stankovíc, was to "stress her own right" to the throne and "precedence over her brother, John."

In view of this belief, Susan C. Jarratt et al. record that Anna was "almost certainly" involved in the murder plot against John at Alexios's funeral. Indeed, Anna, according to Barbara Hill, attempted to create military forces to depose John. According to Choniates, Anna was "stimulated by ambition and revenge" to scheme for the murder of her brother. Smythe states the plots "came to nothing." Jarratt et al., record that, a short time afterward, Anna and Bryennios "organized another conspiracy." However, according to Hill, Bryennios refused to overthrow John, making Anna unable to continue with her plans. With this refusal, Anna, according to Choniates, exclaimed "that nature had mistaken their sexes, for he ought to have been the woman." According to Jarratt et al., Anna shows "a repetition of sexualized anger." Indeed, Smythe asserts that Anna's goals were "thwarted by the men in her life." Irene, however, according to Hill, had declined to participate in plans to revolt against an "established" emperor. Hill, however, points out that Choniates, whom the above sources draw upon, wrote after 1204, and accordingly was "rather far removed" from "actual" events and that his "agenda" was to "look for the causes" of the toppling of Constantinople in 1204.

In contrast, Leonora Neville argues that Anna was probably not involved in the attempted usurpation. Anna plays a minor role in most of the available medieval sources—only Choniates portrays her as a rebel. Choniates' history is from around 1204, almost a hundred years after Alexios I's death. Instead, most of the sources question whether John II Komnenos' behaviour at his father's deathbed was appropriate.

According to the account by Choniates (written after the Fourth Crusade), plots were discovered and Anna forfeited her estates. After her husband's death, she entered the convent of Kecharitomene, which had been founded by her mother. She remained there until her death.

== Historian and intellectual ==
In the seclusion of the monastery, Anna dedicated her time to studying philosophy and history. She held esteemed intellectual gatherings, including those dedicated to Aristotelian studies. Anna's intellectual genius and breadth of knowledge is evident in her few works. Among other things, she was conversant with philosophy, literature, grammar, theology, astronomy and medicine. It can be assumed because of minor errors that she may have quoted Homer and the Bible from memory when writing her most celebrated work, the Alexiad. Her contemporaries, like the metropolitan Bishop of Ephesus, Georgios Tornikes, regarded Anna as a person who had reached "the highest summit of wisdom, both secular and divine."

== The Alexiad ==
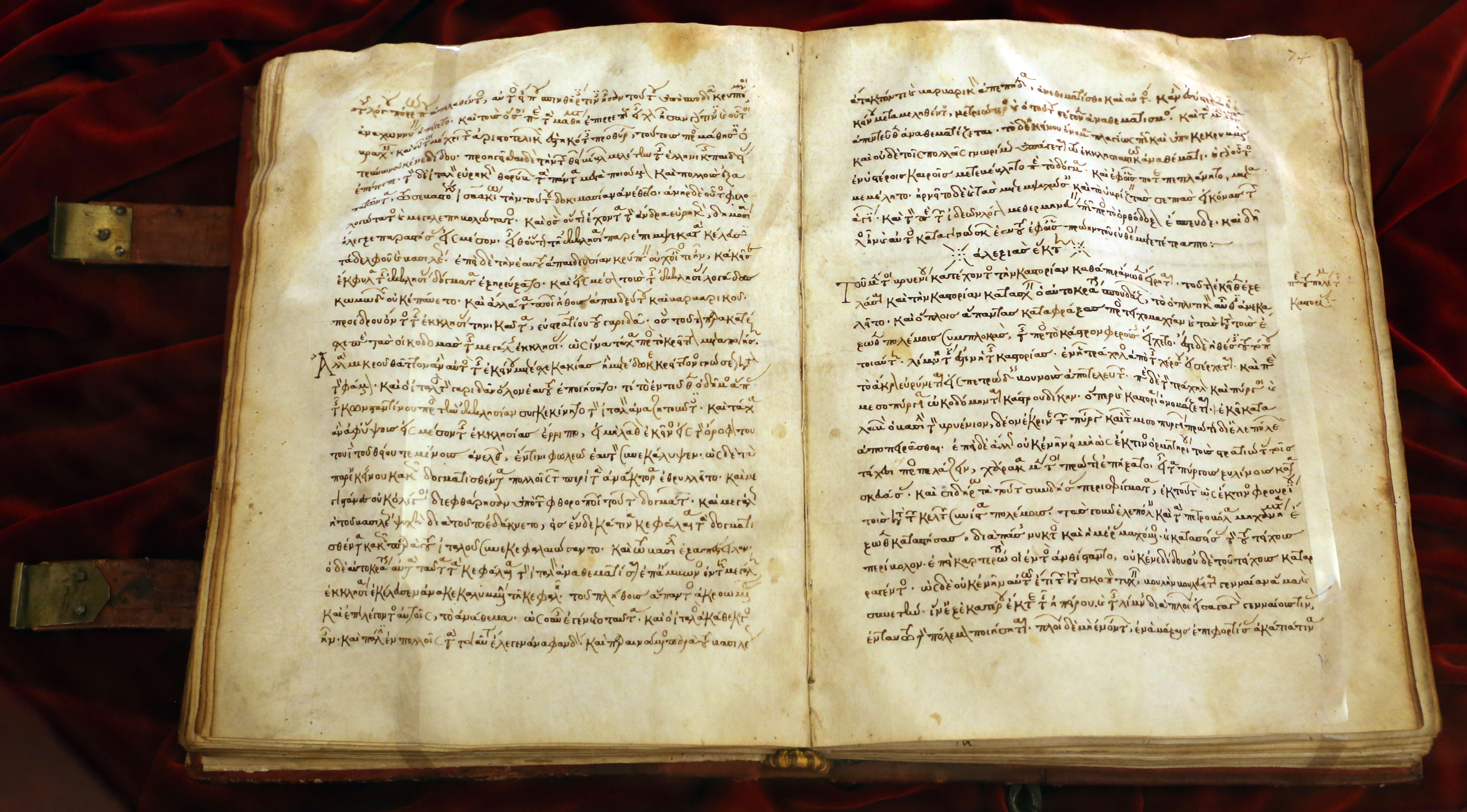
Anna Komnene's Alexiad (12th century manuscript, Laurentian Library)

Anna wrote the Alexiad in the mid-1140s or 1150s. Anna cited her husband's unfinished work as the reason why she began the Alexiad. Before his death in 1137, her husband, Nikephoros Bryennios the Younger, was working on a history, which was supposed to record the events before and during the reign of Alexios I. His death left the history unfinished after recording the events of the reign of Emperor Nikephoros Botaneiates. Ruth Macrides argues that while Bryennios' writing may have been a source of inspiration for the Alexiad, it is incorrect to suggest that the Alexiad was Bryennios' work edited by Anna (as Howard-Johnston has argued on tenuous grounds).

In a statement on how she gathered her sources for the Alexiad, Anna wrote, "My material ... has been gathered from insignificant writings, absolutely devoid of literary pretensions, and from old soldiers who were serving in the army at the time that my father seized the Roman sceptre ... I based the truth of my history on them by examining their narratives and comparing them with what I had written, and what they told me with what I had often heard, from my father in particular and from my uncles ... From all these materials the whole fabric of my history—my true history—has been woven". Beyond just eyewitness accounts from veterans or her male family members, scholars have also noted that Anna used the imperial archives, which allowed her access to official documents.

In the Alexiad, Anna provided insight on political relations and wars between Alexios I and the West. She vividly described weaponry, tactics and battles. It has been noted that she was writing about events that occurred when she was a child, so these are not eye-witness accounts. Her neutrality is compromised by the fact that she was writing to praise her father and denigrate his successors. Despite her unabashed partiality, her account of the First Crusade is of great value to history because it is the only Byzantine eyewitness account available. She had the opportunity to gather information from key figures in the Byzantine elite; her husband, Nikephorus Bryennios, had fought in the clash with crusade leader Godfrey of Bouillon outside Constantinople on Maundy Thursday 1097; and her uncle, George Palaeologos, was present at Pelekanon in June 1097 when Alexios I discussed future strategy with the crusaders. Thus, the Alexiad allows the events of the First Crusade to be seen from the Byzantine elite's perspective. It conveys the alarm felt at the scale of the western European forces proceeding through the Empire, and the dangers they might have posed to the safety of Constantinople.

Anna referred to the crusaders as "Celts", reflecting old Greek terminology for western barbarians.

The Alexiad was written in Attic Greek, and the literary style is fashioned after Thucydides, Polybius and Xenophon. Consequently, it exhibits a struggle for an Atticism characteristic of the period, whereby the resulting language is highly artificial. Peter Frankopan argues that the lapses in some of the chronology of events can in part be attributed to errors in, or lack of, source material for those events. Anna herself also addressed these lapses, explaining them as a result of memory loss and old age. But regardless of errors in chronology, her history meets the standards of her time.

Moreover, the Alexiad sheds light on Anna's emotional turmoil, including her grief over the deaths of her father, mother and husband, among other things. At the end of the Alexiad, Anna wrote "But living I died a thousand deaths ... Yet I am more grief-stricken than Niobe: after my misfortunes, great and terrible as they are, I am still alive—to experience yet more ... Let this be the end of my history, then, lest as I write of these sad events I become even more resentful."

== In popular culture ==
- Anna Komnene plays a secondary role in Sir Walter Scott's 1832 novel Count Robert of Paris.
- She is the principal character in the 1999 novel for young people Anna of Byzantium by Tracy Barrett.
- She appears prominently in the first volume of the trilogy The Crusaders by the Polish novelist Zofia Kossak-Szczucka, written in 1935.
- In Harry Turtledove's Videssos cycle of novels (1987-2005) the character Alypia Gavra is a fictionalized version of Anna Komnene.
- The 1991 novel Az, Anna Komnina (Bulgarian: Аз, Анна Комнина, lit. 'I, Anna Comnena') was written by Vera Mutafchieva, a Bulgarian writer and historian.
- In Julia Kristeva's 2004 murder mystery Murder in Byzantium, Anna Komnene is the focus of the villain's scholarly and amorous fantasy of the past. The novel includes considerable detail on Anna Komnene's life, work and historical context.
- Anna appears in Medieval II: Total War (2006) as a Byzantine princess, under the name Anna Comnenus.
- A novel written in 2008 by the Albanian writer Ben Blushi called Living on an Island mentions her.
- She is a minor character in Nan Hawthorne's novel of the Crusade of 1101, Beloved Pilgrim (2011).
- In the board game Nations (2013), Anna Komnene is an adviser in the Medieval Age.
- Anna Komnene is the main protagonist in Anna Comnena (Japanese: アンナ・コムネナ, romanized: Anna Komunena) (2021), a historical manga by Futaba Sato.
