= Amicus of Giovinazzo =

Amicus of Giovinazzo, also Amicus II (Note: Italian: Amico, French: Ami) (fl. 1063–1090), was a Norman nobleman and military leader during the Norman conquest of southern Italy. He was the count of Molfetta from 1068 until his death and of Giovinazzo from 1068 until 1073. He came from a prominent family often opposed to the rule of the Hautevilles. In 1067–68, 1072–73 and 1079–80 he took part in rebellions against the Hauteville Duke of Apulia. In 1067 and 1079 he received aid from Byzantium against the duke.

In 1074–75, Amicus invaded Croatia, more specifically Dalmatia (theme), in support of the Byzantines in a dispute with the Croatian king. He captured the king, Petar Krešimir IV and probably intended to carve out for himself a principality there, but he was defeated by the Republic of Venice and returned to Italy.

In 1081–82, Amicus participated in the invasion of Byzantium. He led the right wing at the Battle of Dyrrhachium. His bungled attack almost cost the Normans the victory, and he endeavoured to redeem himself by charging the emperor, which was nearly successful.

By 1093 he had been succeeded by his son Godfrey.

== Descent ==
Family tree of the "sons of Amicus"

Amicus II belonged to a family known to modern scholars as the "sons of Amicus". His grandfather and namesake, Amicus I, lived in Normandy before 1030. Two of the latter's sons, Walter and Peter I, arrived in Italy before 1038. Walter was the father of Amicus II and Peter of Lesina. Amicus was thus the first cousin of Peter I's sons, Geoffrey of Taranto and Peter II of Trani. The family was related—how is not known—to the Hauteville family.

== Lands ==
Amicus acquired lands in several places across southern Italy, as well as the lordships of Giovinazzo, Molfetta, Spinazzola and Terlizzi.

On 26 June 1066 in Molfetta, Amicus and his father-in-law made a donation to the Abbey of the Santissima Trinità in Venosa. He also possessed lands in Campomarino that he gave to the Abbey of Santa Maria a Mare in the Tremiti Islands.

Amicus' family was active in the conquest of Apulia. His cousin, Peter II, took Trani in 1054, and his cousin, Geoffrey, took Taranto in 1063 and Otranto in 1064. These conquests were made on their own initiative and the cities were held by them by right of conquest. According to the Anonymous Chronicle of Bari, Amicus entered the small coastal town of Giovinazzo in 1068, (Note: Et Amicetta intravit Juvenacie. (Then Amicus entered Giovinazzo.)) a euphemistic way of saying he conquered it from the Byzantines. Amicus may have been given Giovinazzo (or its tribute) as early as 1058. That he did not, however, possess it at the start of the rebellion of 1067 is suggested by the fact that the Norman chronicler Amatus of Montecassino does not refer to him by any territory, but simply as Ami de Galtier, that is, Amicus son of Walter.

Likewise in 1068, with the rebellion crushed, Amicus' father-in-law fled to Greece and Amicus took over the port city of Molfetta. Amicus' was pardoned after his failed rebellion and forfeited only some minor properties. By October 1069 he had acquired the lordship of Spinazzola, probably by ducal grant. He is called Amico de Spiencello in a charter issued by the duke's chancery. At some point in the next decade, Amicus built a wall around Spinazzola, as the chronicle William of Apulia notes when recording the duke's capture of the town in 1080. Amicus of else his son Godfrey was responsible for the Norman-era fortification of Terlizzi, of which only the square tower still stands.

Following the second failed rebellion in 1073, however, Robert Guiscard confiscated Giovinazzo (which had gone over to his allegiance during the revolt). Amicus did retain Spinazzola, Terlizzi (acquired sometime earlier) and Molfetta after 1073. On 5 September 1073, Amicus founded and made a donation to the church of Saint Michael the Archangel in Terlizzi, which later became the cathedral. (Note: Eggo Amicus gratia dei inclito comes do atque offero seu concedo pro anima mea et de ipso patri meo ipsa die, quo dedicata ipsa sancta ecclesia beati Michaelis Archangeli, que sita est intus in loco nostro Tillizo. (I, Amicus, by the grace of God illustrious count, do grant, offer and cede for my soul and that of my father, this day on which was dedicated to this holy church of the blessed Michael the Archangel, which is situated within our place of Terlizzi.)) The witnesses present were his vassals Bernard Lautard and Azo, the notary Melo and the former Byzantine tourmarches Pantaleon. The donation made no mention of Duke Robert.

Following the third and final rebellion in 1078, Amicus was deprived of Spinazzola as well as his land on Mount Serico (today Castello di Monteserico, part of Genzano di Lucania).

== Early rebellions ==
Robert had to deal with four rebellions: in 1067–68, 1072–73, 1079–80 and 1082–83. Only in the last of these did Amicus not join the rebels.

=== 1067–68 ===
There is disagreement among scholars concerning the dating of the first revolt. The Anonymous Chronicle of Bari has it beginning, under the leadership of Amicus' father-in-law Joscelin of Molfetta, in 1064, but there is little indication of military activity between that year and 1067. It is possible there were three separate but related revolts in 1064 (led by Joscelin), 1066 (Abelard) and 1067–68 (Amicus).

The revolt led by Amicus began between September and November 1067 while Guiscard was in Calabria. Among the other rebels were Joscelin, as well as Roger Toutebove and Guiscard's own disaffected nephews, Count Geoffrey of Conversano and the dispossessed Abelard. The rebellion received Byzantine financing. According to Amatus of Montecassino, Amicus himself was "lent … 100 hundredweight of gold" to spread the revolt, in exchange for which he sent a son as a hostage to Leo Perenos, the Byzantine duke of Dyrrhachium who was organizing the revolt.

Amatus stresses that Guiscard moved quickly to suppress the first challenge to his rule, campaigning in the autumn of 1067 and into 1068. The beginning of the Siege of Bari in August 1068 suggests that the revolt had collapsed early that year, to allow enough time for Guiscard to prepare a major military operation against the last Byzantine stronghold in Italy. Following their defeat, Joscelin and Roger Toutebove fled to Constantinople, while Amicus and Guiscard's nephews were pardoned, losing only a few lands. Amicus and Abelard were present with the ducal entourage soon after. As an incentive to obedience, they were offered the opportunity to recover the lands they had lost or else receive new lands. By October 1069 Amicus had acquired the new lordship of Spinazzola.

=== 1072–73 ===
The cause of the second revolt was Guiscard's order to Peter II to hand over Taranto, which he was governing on behalf of his young nephew, Richard, son of Geoffrey. Peter refused to comply and the pardoned rebels of 1067, Amicus and Abelard, supported him. The rebellion was also joined by Abelard's half-brother Herman, the Calabrian baron Robert Areng and Count Richard of Monte Sant'Angelo. Through the latter's contact, the rebels gained the support of the Prince Richard I of Capua, the main rival of the Hautevilles in Italy.

The second revolt went badly. Guiscard captured Trani on 2 February 1073 and shortly afterwards Duke Guy of Sorrento captured Peter in a skirmish outside Andria. This time Amicus was deprived of Giovinazzo, although he held onto Molfetta and was allowed to keep Spinazzola and Terlizzi. Herman was captured during the revolt, but Abelard remained defiant in Calabria and did not make peace with the duke until early 1078. Amicus never recovered Giovinazzo. After Guiscard's death (1085), it was granted to his son Bohemond as part of the succession settlement in 1086.

== Invasion of Croatia ==
Italy and the Adriatic in Amicus' time. He captured Spalato (Split) in 1074 and took part in the battle of Durazzo (Dyrrhacium).

Amicus activity in Croatia at the coastal part of the region Dalmatia, during the period from the fall of Petar Krešimir IV (d. 1074) to the coronation of Demetrius Zvonimir (1075), in the scholarship was initially explained as an involvement on the behalf of the Holy See against Petar Krešimir IV due to supposed antagonism among the local clergy towards church reforms. It has been argued that the Croatian king whom Amicus captured was not Petar Krešimir, but rather a certain Slavac, a champion of the Old Church Slavonic liturgy, who had succeeded the childless Krešimir upon the latter's death in late 1073 or early 1074, when his nephew Stephen was judged unfit and forced to enter a monastery. Pope Gregory VII allegedly encouraged the expedition of Amicus to remove Slavac and restore the Latin rite. The reign of Slavac is known only from a Renaissance source, Johannes Lucius, in fact, there was no 11th-century king of that name, but rather a 12th-century nobleman who was mistaken for a king by later generations. At the time, the papal legate to Croatia was Gerard, who, as the archbishop of Siponto, was almost a neighbour of Amicus in southern Italy. It was probably his idea to use Amicus to help place Zvonimir, considered an ally of Rome, on the throne. Having been recently deprived of his lordship of Giovinazzo, Amicus was probably easily persuaded to make his fortune in Dalmatia, promised with a land or a principality of his own as a reward. Modern historigraphy rejects such older theorizations, because Petar Krešimir IV was loyal to the Holy See and church reforms.

Guiscard, on the other hand, had been excommunicated in 1074 and Amicus would not have felt any need to seek his permission. However, Amicus lost many lands to Guiscard, to get new ones, and possibly found a new Norman-style principality, Amicus was persuaded by the Byzantine emperor Michael VII Doukas to attack Petar Krešimir IV because the Croatian king abandoned emperor's sovereignty and took in control Dalmatian cities from the Byzantines, and aided the Uprising of Georgi Voyteh against Byzantines. Formally, Amicus was invited to Dalmatia by the communes of Split, Trogir, Zadar and Biograd.

He embarked in the spring of 1074, probably from Molfetta, which was in his control, or possibly from Ancona further up the coast. By 19 March, the Normans occupied several coastal Dalmatian city-states, including Split, Trogir, Zadar and Biograd. As the next target, according to a late source, Amicus attacked the coast of the Gulf of Quarnero. Between 14 April and 9 May (Translation of Saint Nicholas), he besieged the town of Rab on the island of the same name. The Miracula Sancti Christophori of Bishop Juraj Koštica, written towards 1308, reports that "a large group of Varangians" (Note: quaedam ingens Varagorum gens.) assaulted Rab. He provides dates, but no year, although from context it appears it can refer only to the expedition of Amicus who, as a Norman, could be described as a "Varangian" (Viking).

In November 1074, Gerard held another synod at Split to reaffirm the decisions of 1060. According to a synodal document, it took place "at the time when duke Amicus took the Croatian king prisoner." Although it does not name the king, Petar Krešimir must be meant. A letter of Pope Gregory VII to Stephen II, bishop of Zadar, dated to November 1074, also mentions the capture of Petar Krešimir by Amicus. This is the last mention of Krešimir in any source. According to one source, it was while capturing the stronghold of Novalja on the island of Pag that Amicus captured the king.

While the Croatian king was in captivity, it seems that negotiations between the Papacy, the ban Zvonimir and the Norman count were ongoing. In a letter to Sweyn II of Denmark on 25 January 1075, Gregory VII writes that an unnamed Danish bishop had intimated that Sweyn might be willing to send one of his sons with an army to assist the Roman church against its vulgar and cowardly heretic enemies (Normans) in a land which Gregory does not name but which was almost certainly Croatia. By 8 February 1075, however, Amicus had been substantially defeated through Venetian intervention. He had lost control of the Dalmatian cities of Split, Trogir, Zadar and Biograd, for on that date the Venetian doge, Domenico Selvo, exacted an oath from four cities that they would never again invite the Normans in. Although Venice had been encouraged by the Byzantines to remove the Normans from Dalmatia (which Krešimir had only governed as a Byzantine province), the Venetian treaty with the Dalmatian cities made no reference to Byzantine authority: "Venice was now a fully autonomous state exercising its sovereignty without reference to any higher authority". The Danish plan by the Pope and Venetian asspirations toward Dalmatia came to nothing as Zvonimir was crowned by Abbot Gebizo with regalia gifted by the pope at Solin on 9 October 1075 after swearing an oath to the papacy.

== Third rebellion ==
In 1078, Robert provoked a third revolt when he demanded an aid (auxilium) from his barons for the dowry of his daughter Gersent, betrothed to Hugh, son of Azzo II, marquis of Este. The revolt began in early 1079, when Peter II seized Trani, which had been confiscated from him in 1073. He was soon joined by Amicus and other inveterate opponents of Guiscard: his nephews Abelard, Herman, Geoffrey and now Geoffrey's brother, Count Robert of Montescaglioso; Count Henry of Monte Sant'Angelo, brother of Richard; and a certain baron named Baldwin. Argyritzos, former leader of the pro-Norman faction in Bari, had arranged the marriage of his daughter to Abelard in 1078. He threw his support behind the rebels and negotiated aid from Byzantium. Abelard had also arranged the marriage of his sister to a certain Gradilon, probably one of the leaders of the Slavic communities in northern Apulia. Through the Count of Monte Sant'Angelo, Prince Jordan I of Capua, who had succeeded his father in 1078, lent his support to the rebels.

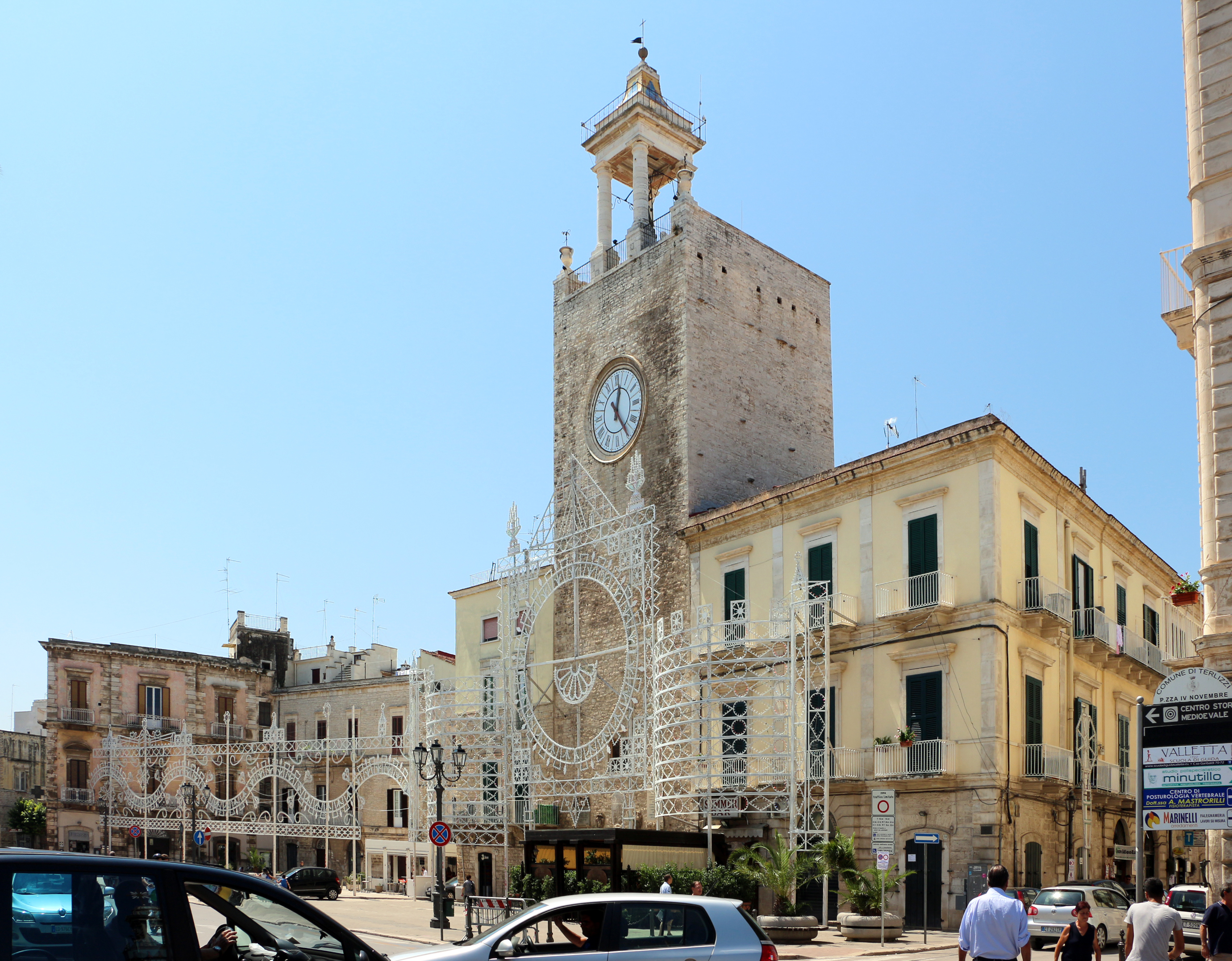
The square tower of Terlizzi, much modified over the years, was built by Amicus or his son.

Amicus appears to have been recognised as the senior rebel, since William of Apulia labels him the "most learned (experienced) count and ally". (Note: comes et sociatus Amicus doctior.) With Peter II, he marched on Giovinazzo. Defended by William, son of Ivo, the town remained loyal to Guiscard. The cousins put it to siege, but it was relieved by the arrival of a sizeable army under Guiscard's son Roger Borsa. It received an exemption from all taxes for three years in reward for its loyalty.

In the fall of 1079, Guiscard negotiated an agreement with Jordan of Capua, which destroyed the rebels' hope of outside support. Soon after Amicus made peace. In early 1080, Peter surrendered Trani and the rebellion came to an end. Even before Amicus had surrendered, Guiscard had confiscated Spinazzola and granted it to Godfrey, one of Amicus' vassals who had not joined him in revolt. Amicus' land on Mount Serico was likewise confiscated.

Between 1072 and 1080, documents survive from Terlizzi dated by the reigns of the Byzantine emperors. Amicus appears to have allowed this so as to prevent his subjects from recognising Duke Robert. His cousin Peter II followed a similar policy. In 1080 it came to an end and private documents from Amicus' domains (and Peter's) are dated from then on by the regnal year of "most invincible Lord Robert, duke of Italy, Calabria and Sicily". (Note: dominus Robertus invictissimus dux Italiae, Calabriae, Siciliae.) Also from this time Amicus was represented in Terlizzi by a viscount, Urso, perhaps delegated to enforce the new permanent peace.

== Loyal vassal ==
Having made his peace, which turned out to be permanent, Amicus took part in Robert Guiscard's attack on the Byzantine Empire in 1081, which culminated in the fall of Dyrrhachium in February 1082 after an eight-month siege. He led the right wing at the Battle of Dyrrhachium. Anna Komnene, daughter of the Emperor Alexios I Komnenos, is the primary source for the battle. She calls Amicus Amiketas. Amicus' wing faced the Byzantine wing under Gregory Pakourianos to the north. Anna records that Amicus, leading a "formation of infantry and cavalry"—his entire wing—"struck near to the extremity of the battle line of Nabites", one of the Varangian generals. The charge was repulsed, with some men fleeing towards the sea while some Byzantines, believe the battle over, plundered the Norman baggage. Seeking to redeem himself, Amicus then led a small detachment to charge at Alexios himself and his guard of cavalry. The emperor barely escaped Amicus' lance, but the disorderly behaviour of his troops had rattled the emperor's Dukljan allies, who abandoned the field. Alexios then called a retreat and the Normans were victorious.

Amicus did not take part in Guiscard's invasion of Cephalonia in 1085, during which the latter died. He remained loyal to the duke's successor, Roger Borsa. He was recorded with Roger in Calabria in May 1087.

== Marriage and issue ==
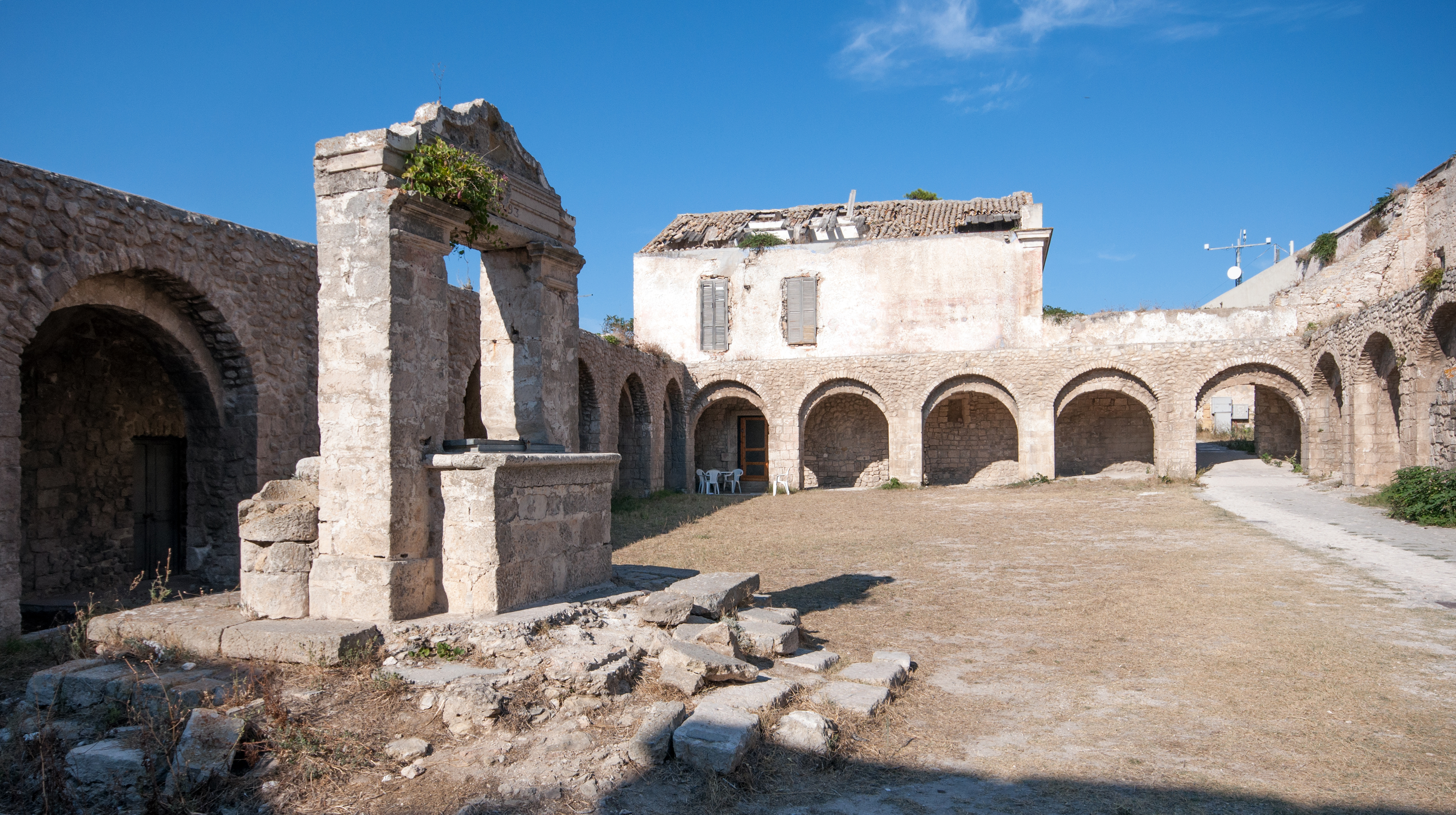
Ruins of Santa Maria a Mare today.

Amicus was married to a daughter (name unknown) of Count Joscelin of Molfetta. With her he had at least one son named Godfrey or Geoffrey (fl. 1089–1105). Having in effect acquired Molfetta through Godfrey's mother, Amicus was able to pass it on to his son despite the loss of his other lands through confiscation for rebellion. Godfrey also inherited from his father the castle of Terlizzi, a connection to Dalmatia and possibly a rebellious spirit. He was returning from Dalmatia, quite possibly from exile, when he passed through the Tremiti Islands in 1092 or 1093. In August 1093 he restored to the Abbey of Santa Maria a Mare the two properties in Campomarino that his father had donated because that God had "restored him to his power", suggesting that he had been temporarily out of power. In 1098, a document refers to Godfrey as an "imperial sebastos", suggesting a continued link with Byzantium. (Note: dominus noster Goffridus imperiali sevasto et comes, Amici comitis filius (our lord Godfrey, imperial sebastos and count, son of count Amicus).)

When his father's old ally Herman left on the First Crusade in 1097, Godfrey took control of his fief at Cannae. In the event, Herman died on crusade. Godfrey himself was dead by October 1107. Roger (fl. 1120–29), "son and heir of Count Godfrey", seems to have lost both Molfetta and the rights in Campomarino, but retained Terlizzi. Count Robert II of Loritello took control of Campomarino and Godfrey's grant of 1093 was voided, only for Robert to grant the same two properties anew to the Abbey of Santa Maria a Mare in 1111. Unlike his father and grandfather, Roger did not use the title of count, suggesting a clear diminution of his authority. A certain William, count of Cannae in 1117, may have been another son of Count Godfrey, but there is no proof.

== Sources ==
- Babudri, F. (1959). "Il Conte Amico di Giovinazzo: la sua impresa adriatica e la marineria apulo-normanna". Archivio Storico Pugliese. 12: 87–137.
- Brown, P. (2016). Mercenaries to Conquerors: Norman Warfare in the Eleventh- and Twelfth-Century Mediterranean. Pen & Sword Military.
- Budak, Neven (2018). Hrvatska povijest od 550. do 1100 [Croatian history from 550 until 1100]. Leykam international. ISBN 978-953-340-061-7.
- Burke, M. (2011). Early Rebellion and Its Links to Later Success and Conquest: Why was it that some Norman rulers profited from rebellions early in their reigns, whilst others did not? (PDF) (MA diss.). University of Chester.
- Chalandon, F. (1907). Histoire de la domination normande en Italie et en Sicile. Paris: A. Picard.
- Cowdrey, H. E. J. (1998). Pope Gregory VII, 1073–1085. Oxford: Clarendon Press.
- Curta, F. (2006). Southeastern Europe in the Middle Ages, 500–1250. Cambridge: Cambridge University Press.
- Fine, J. V. A. (1983). The Early Medieval Balkans: A Critical Survey from the Late Twelfth Century to the Ottoman Conquest. University of Michigan Press.
- Jahn, W. (1989). Untersuchungen zur normannischen Herrschaft in Suditalien (1040–1100). Peter Lang.
- Košćak, V. (1991). "Gregorio VII e la Croazia: Presupposti politico-sociali". Studi gregoriani. 14: 253–64.
- Licinio, R. (1994). Castelli medievali: Puglia e Basilicata, dai Normanni a Federico II e Carlo I d'Angiò. Bari: Edizioni Dedalo.
- Loud, G. A. (2000). The Age of Robert Guiscard: Southern Italy and the Norman Conquest. Harlow: Pearson Educational.
- Margetić, L. (1999). "The Croatian State during the Era of Rulers from the Croatian National Dynasty". In Ivan Supičić (ed.). Croatia in the Early Middle Ages: A Cultural Survey. London: Philip Wilson Publishers. pp. 197–214.
- Nicol, D. M. (1988). Byzantium and Venice: A Study in Diplomatic and Cultural Relations. Cambridge: Cambridge University Press.
- Praga, G. (1993). History of Dalmatia. Giardini.
- Spremić, M. (1991). "Gregorio VII e gli Slavi del sud". Studi gregoriani. 14: 239–43.
- Stephenson, P. (2000). Byzantium's Balkan Frontier: A Political Study of the Northern Balkans, 900–1204. Cambridge: Cambridge University Press.
- Stipišić, J. (1999). "Croatia in Diplomatic Sources up to the End of the 11th Century". In Ivan Supičić (ed.). Croatia in the Early Middle Ages: A Cultural Survey. London: Philip Wilson Publishers. pp. 285–318.
- Theotokis, G. (2014). Norman Campaigns in the Balkans, 1081–1108. Woodbridge: Boydell.
- Valente, G. (1997). Feudalesimo e feudatari in sette secoli di storia di un comune pugliese: Terlizzi, 1073–1779. Vol. 5. Mezzina.
- Zekan, Mate (1990). Kralj Zvonimir - dokumenti i spomenici [King Zvonimir - Documents and Monuments] (in Croatian and English). Zagreb: Muzej hrvatskih arheoloških spomenika Split, arheološki muzej Zagreb. pp. 12–15.
