= Loritello =

Loritello was an Italo-Norman county along the Adriatic north of the Gargano, now called Rotello, in the Molise region. It was carved out of the eastern seaboard of the Principality of Benevento following the Battle of Civitate in 1053 by members of the Hauteville family. The last Count of Loritello died in 1184 and the title was never revived.

Geoffrey of Hauteville, a younger brother of Humphrey, Count of Apulia, began the conquest of what would become Loritello when he attacked the Lombard county of Larino and captured the castle of Morrone in Samnium Guillamatum. In 1061, Geoffrey's son Robert received the title primo comiti de Loritello: first count of Loritello. Robert continued expanding his county by conquering the county of Teate (modern Chieti), with which he invested his brother Drogo, and attacking Ortona, which was to become the chief objective of the count's later career. Robert was at odds with the church, whose Papal States neighboured Loritello. In 1080, Robert counted men, both Lombard and Norman, as far as the river Pescara as his vassals and Pope Gregory VII, concluding a truce with Robert's overlord, Robert Guiscard, recognised Loritello as Robert's and requested that papal lands be treated with respect.

In the early twelfth century, Loritello was extended across the Fortore to include Bovino and Dragonara. Robert's successors, Robert II and William, allied themselves with the Church and the Empire and opposed their own overlords, for which reasons Loritello was confiscated. It remained a part of the royal demesne of the Kingdom of Sicily until William the Bad granted it to Robert of Bassunvilla in 1154.

Under Robert III, Loritello enjoined near complete autonomy from royal officials and the counts retained the right to administer justice (justiciaria). The power of the county peaked during the regency of William the Good, but afterwards declined, and when Robert III died in 1184, the county was not regranted.

== Counts of Loritello ==
Year(s)	Name	Notes
1061-1107	Robert I of Loritello	first Count of Loritello
1107-1137	Robert II of Loritello	son of Robert I
1137	William of Loritello	son of Robert II
1137-1154	none	
1154-1182/4	Robert III of Loritello (also known as Robert II of Bassunvilla)	not related to the previous counts

== See also ==
- Battle of Civitate
- Robert Guiscard
- Robert I of Loritello
- Robert II of Loritello
- Robert III of Loritello

== Sources ==
- Matthew, Donald. The Norman Kingdom of Sicily (Cambridge Medieval Textbooks), 1992.
- History of the Norman World.
