= Peter of Lesina =

Peter (fl. 1056–92) was the Norman count of Lesina in the Duchy of Apulia. He was a son of Walter of Civitate and brother of Amicus of Giovinazzo. Unlike several members of his family, including his brother, he remained loyal to Duke Robert Guiscard throughout the latter's life.

In December 1081, Peter and Count Robert I of Loritello witnessed the renunciation by Abbot Desiderius (the future Pope Victor III) of the claims of the Abbey of Montecassino over the Abbey of Santa Maria a Mare on Tremiti.

On Duke Robert's death in 1085, Peter recognised Roger Borsa as his successor and in August 1086 accompanied him on his visit to Sicily, which was then in the process of being conquered by the Normans from its Muslim rulers. He attended the ducal court again in 1092, witnessing a charter of Duke Roger, but the remoteness of Lesina in northern Apulia seems generally to have kept him out of the civil strife of the kingdom, into which his brother Amicus was frequently drawn.

Peter was succeeded as count of Lesina by a son, Rao (fl. 1099). Richard, the first count of Manoppello, may have been a son.

== Sources ==
- Loud, G. A. (2000). The Age of Robert Guiscard: Southern Italy and the Norman Conquest. Harlow: Pearson Educational.
