= Byzantine–Norman wars =

Series of Norman invasions of the Byzantine Empire between 1040 and 1189

Byzantine–Norman Wars
Date	1040–1189
Location	Balkans and southern Italy
Result	Indecisive
Territorial changes	Norman conquest of Apulia, Calabria and the Ionian Islands; Norman invasion of the Balkans defeated

Belligerents
Byzantine Empire; Republic of Venice; Holy Roman Empire	Normans; Kingdom of Sicily (after 1130); Apulia and Calabria; County of Sicily; Duchy of Naples; Lombard duchies; Empire of Cyprus (after 1184); Papal States; Duchy of Benevento; Principality of Antioch; Duklja; Grand Principality of Serbia; Kingdom of Croatia

Commanders and leaders
Alexios I Komnenos; John II Komnenos; Alexios Komnenos; Manuel I Komnenos; Michael Palaiologos; John Doukas (POW); Alexios Komnenos (POW); Robert III of Loritello; Andronikos Komnenos; Isaac II Angelos; Alexios Branas; Nikephoros Melissenos; Michael Maurex; John Doukas Andronikos Doukas Nikephoros Botaneiates; John Doukas Robert of Loritello Alexios Komnenos; Michael Dokeianos Harald Hardrada	Robert Guiscard; Bohemond of Taranto; Roussel de Bailleul; George of Antioch; William II; Constantine Bodin; Margaritus of Brindisi; William I; Count Baldwin (POW) Count Richard of Acerra (POW); William Iron Arm Rainulf Drengot

The Byzantine–Norman wars were a series of military conflicts between the Normans and the Byzantine Empire fought from c. 1040 to 1186 involving the Norman-led Kingdom of Sicily in the west, and the Principality of Antioch in the Levant. The last of the Norman invasions, though having incurred disaster upon the Romans by sacking Thessalonica in 1185, was eventually driven out and vanquished by 1186.

== History ==
=== Norman conquest of southern Italy (1040-1071) ===
The Normans' initial military involvement in southern Italy was on the side of the Lombards against the Byzantines. Eventually, some Normans, including the powerful de Hauteville brothers, served in the army of George Maniakes during the attempted Byzantine reconquest of Sicily, only to turn against their employers when the emirs proved difficult to conquer. By 1030, Rainulf became count of Aversa, marking the start of permanent Norman settlement in Italy. In 1042, William de Hauteville was made a count, taking Lombard prince Guaimar IV of Salerno as his liege. To further strengthen ties and legitimacy, Robert Guiscard also married Lombard Princess Sikelgaita in 1058. Following the death of Guaimar, the Normans were increasingly independent actors on the southern Italian scene, which brought them into direct conflict with Byzantium.

During the time that the Normans had conquered southern Italy, the Byzantine Empire was in a state of internal decay; the administration of the Empire had been wrecked, the efficient government institutions that provided Basil II with a quarter of a million troops and adequate resources by taxation had collapsed within a period of three decades. Attempts by Isaac I Komnenos and Romanos IV Diogenes to reverse the situation proved unfruitful. The premature death of the former and the overthrow of the latter led to further collapse as the Normans consolidated their conquest of Sicily and Italy.

Reggio Calabria, the capital of the tagma of Calabria, was captured by Robert Guiscard in 1060. At the time, the Byzantines held a few coastal towns in Apulia, including Bari, the capital of the catepanate of Italy. In 1067–68, they gave financial support to a rebellion against Guiscard. In 1068, the Normans besieged Otranto; in the same year, they began the siege of Bari itself. After defeating the Byzantines in a series of battles in Apulia, and after two major attempts to relieve the city had failed, the city Bari surrendered in April 1071, ending the Byzantine presence in southern Italy.

In 1079–80, the Byzantines again gave their support to a rebellion against Guiscard. This support came largely in the form of financing smaller Norman mercenary groups to assist in the rebellion.

Over a thirty-year period (1061–1091), Norman factions also completed the initial Byzantine attempt to retake Sicily. However, it would not be until 1130 that both Sicily and southern Italy were united into one kingdom, formalized by Roger II of Sicily.

=== First Norman invasion of the Balkans (1081–1085) ===
First Norman invasion of the Balkans

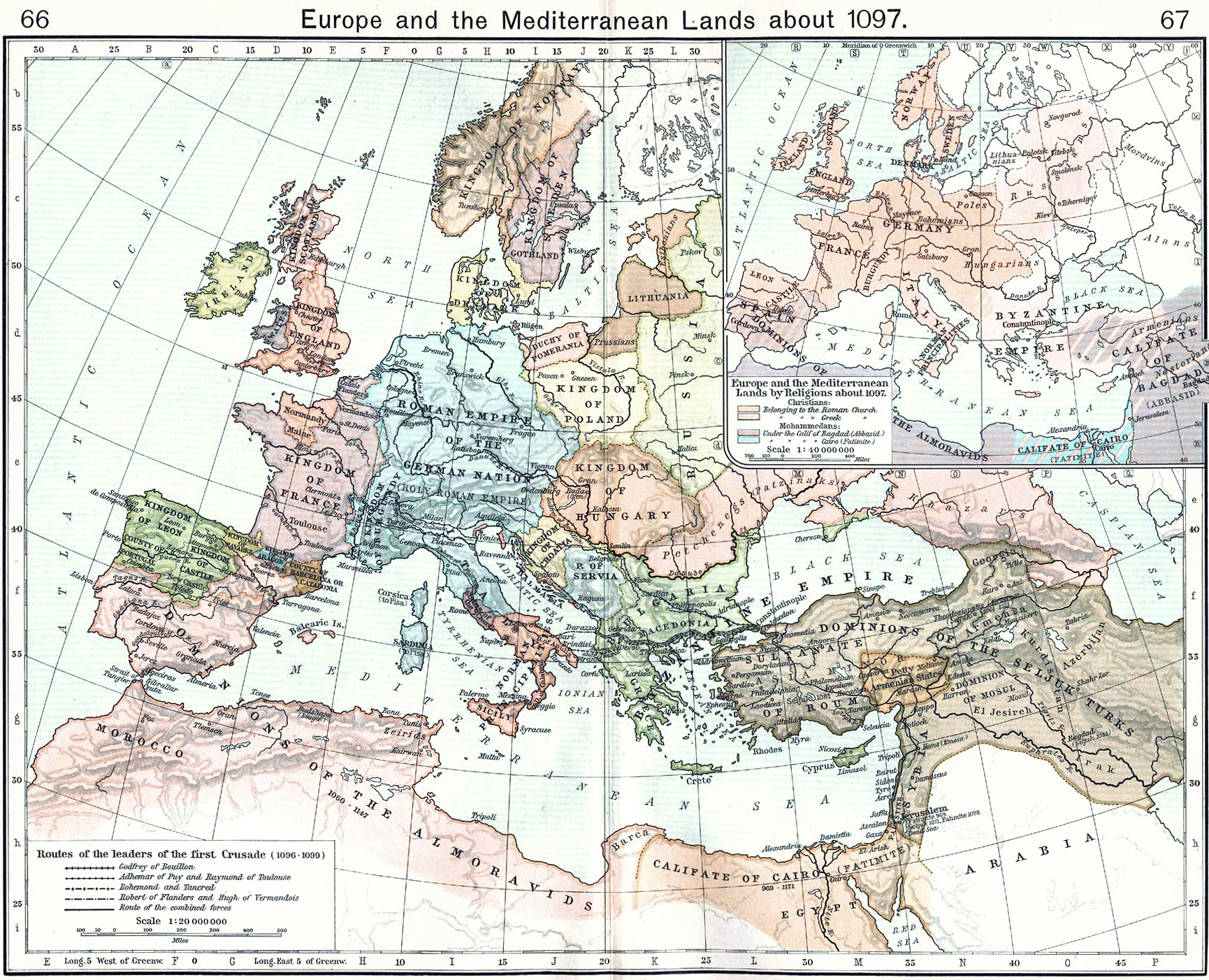
The map of Europe after the death of Robert Guiscard in 1085

Following their successful conquest of southern Italy, the Norman faction led by Robert Guiscard saw no reason to stop; Byzantium was decaying further still and looked ripe for conquest. Further pressing Norman motivation to invade was consistent support by the Byzantines for uprisings against Robert Guiscard. The Western edge of the Byzantine empire in particular was known for being a safe haven for rebel groups. When Alexios I Comnenus ascended to the throne of Byzantium, his early emergency reforms, such as requisitioning Church money—a previously unthinkable move—proved too little to stop the Normans.

Led by the formidable Robert Guiscard and his son Bohemund of Taranto (later, Bohemund I of Antioch), and aided by the naval forces of their ally, the Croatian king Demetrius Zvonimir, Norman forces landed at Dyrrhacium, and put it under siege. Alexios marched to relieve the city, and engaged the Normans on October 18, 1081. The Varangians were placed as a vanguard, but were lured by retreating Normans and destroyed. The main line of the Romans engaged the Normans, but their morale was shaky from witnessing the annihilation of the Varangians, and they were unskilled compared to the veteran Normans. Before long, they broke and were routed. Alexios himself barely managed to escape. Dyrrachium, in the long term, would prove to be as crushing a defeat as Manzikert for the Empire. (see Battle of Dyrrhachium). The Normans would soon take Dyrrhachium and Corfu, The Normans continued to take cities around Dyrrhachium, marching to and taking Castoria, and preparing to launch an attack at the second city of the empire, Thessaloncia. Alexios, desperately looking for a way to save his empire, took drastic diplomatic action. He hoped to make the Holy Roman Emperor assault the Papal States, the Normans' nominal suzerain since 1080, in order to force Guiscard to march to the pope's aid. He enhanced his offer by bribing the German king Henry IV with 360,000 gold pieces to attack the Normans as well as the papacy in Italy, which forced Guiscard to concentrate on his defenses at home in 1083–1084, and he sailed home with the majority of his force, leaving Bohemond in command of the remaining Normans in the Balkans. He also secured the alliance of Henry, Count of Monte Sant'Angelo, who controlled the Gargano peninsula and dated his charters by Alexios's reign.

Bohemond began his campaign with vigor. Instead of marching against Thessaloncia, like his father had planned, Bohemond marched south to Ioannina, the capital of Epirus. The city quickly surrendered, while Alexios had regrouped since Dyrrhachium, and, having mustered a new army, rode to retake the city. Sometime in summer 1082, Alexios and Bohemond met outside of Ioannina. Numbers are unknown, but it is estimated that Alexios slightly outnumbered the Normans. Alexios had hoped to lure Bohemond into a frontal charge, where he could then flank the Normans. However, Bohemond instead ordered his knights to charge from the flanks, surprising the Romans, who quickly routed, with most of the infantry slaughtered. Alexios fled once more to Thessalonica, where he levied a new army, paying for them mainly with Orthodox treasures from churches. Bohemond, meanwhile, continued to march south, where he besieged Arta. However, unlike Ioannina, Arta held out. Alexios once again marched to relieve the besieged cities, forcing Bohemond to lift the siege to meet Alexios's army. Before the battle, Alexios placed stakes to impale the Normans' horses, but Bohemond again outflanked the emperor with his knights, crushing Alexios's army once more. The Romans, fully demoralized from several defeats, withdrew almost instantly once they became flanked, and the front line infantry was again surrounded and slaughtered. However, unlike Dyrrhachium and Ioannina, the Romans did not fully rout, and Alexios managed to restore order among his men, and retreat. Bohemond, pressing his advantage, did not renew the siege, but instead marched north, subduing Skopje before marching back to Castoria for the winter. However, the young Norman had grown confident in his army after his victories, and, instead of wintering in warm beds, decided to besiege Larissa, the regional capital.

It was already early November by the time Bohemond reached the city and put it under siege. The cities defense was led by Leo Cephalas, a veteran soldier, and completely loyal to Alexios. Cephalas held out for six months through a grueling winter, but by spring, supplies were running out, and the city began to starve. However, during the winter, the stubborn emperor had been rallying yet another army, including 7,000 Turkish mercenaries from the Sultanate of Rum, and in spring, he marched towards Larissa. He also sent agents to sow dissent within the Norman camp, accusing high-ranking officers of treason, which undermined Bohemond's authority. Alexios reached the city in late spring, and spent several weeks drilling his men, and planning his attack. Alexios knew that his unskilled army had no chance in open battle against Bohemond's veteran, capable force, as shown at Ioannina and Arta. Instead, he used locals to teach his commanders about every detail of the land, and planned an ambush.

In July 1083, Alexios made his move. He sent the majority of his army in full view of the Normans, daring them to attack. Bohemond formed up for battle, and charged. However, the imperial army retreated, leading the Normans into the trap. Soon, the Normans, who were still chasing the imperial army, were attacked from the flank by Alexios's skirmishers and Turks. Here, Bohemond became separated from the majority of his army, as Count Brienne, one of Bohemond's commanders, peeled off his knights to attack his harassers. However, this would prove to be a disaster. The Count's heavily armored knights could not keep up with Alexios's Turks, and unable to engage their enemy, they were decimated by Turkish arrows. Brienne lost most of his force, and routed. Meanwhile, Bohemond ordered his troops to retreat back to the siege camp, wary of being outflanked. Back at the camp, he was met with the shattered remains of Brienne's forces. The next morning, the Romans, now vastly outnumbering their foes, attacked Bohemonds siege camp. Bohemond, learning from Brienne's mistakes, ordered his forces to not pursue the enemies. Alexios, instead of attacking directly, used his Turks once again to harass the Normans. Bohemond ordered his men to dismount and form a shield wall to protect themselves from the missile fire. After several hours of this harassment, arrows felling many, the Normans finally broke, and retreated back west, to Trikala. Alexios did not pursue.

Bohemond managed to restore control of his forces at Trikala. However, Alexios went all in to subdue the Norman threat. Having already sown dissent within the Norman forces prior to Larissa, Alexios bribed many soldiers handsomely to desert Bohemond. Bohemond found he could not compete with the emperor in terms of bribes, as Alexios had the wealth of the entire Eastern Roman Empire, while Bohemond was alone in enemy territory. Bohemond, fearing complete mutiny, was forced to sail back to Italy, abandoning all the gains he had made in the Balkans. Despite the several great victories Bohemond had won, in the end, it had only taken one defeat to doom his cause. In the next years, Roman armies, with the help of the Venetians, retook all the land Bohemond had taken.

The Norman danger ended for the time being with the death of Robert Guiscard in 1085, combined with a Byzantine victory and crucial Venetian aid that allowed the Byzantines to retake the Balkans. Alexios had to grant the Venetians, privileges to assure their support, something that eventually led to them controlling a substantial amount of the empire's financial sector.

=== Rebellion of Antioch (1104–1140) ===
During the time of the First Crusade, the Byzantines were able to utilize, to some extent, Norman mercenaries to defeat the Seljuk Turks in numerous battles. These Norman mercenaries were instrumental in the capture of multiple cities. It is speculated that, in exchange for an oath of loyalty, Alexios promised land around the city of Antioch to Bohemond in order to create a buffer vassal state and simultaneously keep Bohemond away from Italy. However, when Antioch fell the Normans refused to hand it over, although in time Byzantine domination was established. Out of fear that this signaled Byzantine intentions to reconquer southern Italy and remove his suzerainty over the Normans, Pope Innocent II declared the emperor excommunicated, and threatened any Latin Christian who served in his army with the same consequence. With the death of John Comnenus the Norman Principality of Antioch rebelled once again, invading Cilicia (which would also rebel), and sacking much of Cyprus. The quick and energetic response of Manuel Komnenus allowed the Byzantines to extract an even more favorable modus vivendi with Antioch (in 1145 being forced to provide Byzantium with a contingent of troops and allow a Byzantine garrison in the city). However, the city was given guarantees of protection against Turkic attack and Nur ad-Din Zangi abstained from attacking the northern parts of the Crusader states as a result.

=== Second Norman invasion of the Balkans (1147–1149) ===
Southern Italy in 1112, at the time of Roger II's coming of age, showing the major states and cities. The border of the Kingdom of Sicily in 1154, at the time of Roger's death, is shown by a thicker black line encircling most of southern Italy.

In 1147 the Byzantine empire under Manuel I Comnenus was faced with war by Roger II of Sicily, whose fleet had captured the Byzantine island of Corfu and plundered Thebes and Corinth. However, despite being distracted by a Cuman attack in the Balkans, in 1148 Manuel enlisted the alliance of Conrad III of Germany, and the help of the Venetians, who quickly defeated Roger with their powerful fleet. In c. 1148, the political situation in the Balkans was divided by two sides, one being the alliance of the Byzantines and Venice, the other the Normans and Hungarians. The Normans were sure of the danger that the battlefield would move from the Balkans to their area in Italy. The Serbs, Hungarians and Normans exchanged envoys, being in the interest of the Normans to stop Manuel's plans to recover Italy. In 1149, Manuel recovered Corfu and prepared to take the offensive against the Normans, while Roger II sent George of Antioch with a fleet of 40 ships to pillage Constantinople's suburbs. Manuel had already agreed with Conrad on a joint invasion and partition of southern Italy and Sicily. The renewal of the German alliance remained the principal orientation of Manuel's foreign policy for the rest of his reign, despite the gradual divergence of interests between the two empires after Conrad's death. However, while Manuel was in Valona planning the offensive across the Adriatic, the Serbs revolted, posing a danger to the Byzantine Adriatic bases.

=== Manuel I's intervention in southern Italy (1155–1156) ===
The death of Roger in February 1154, who was succeeded by William I, combined with the widespread rebellions against the rule of the new King in Sicily and Apulia, the presence of Apulian refugees at the Byzantine court, and Frederick Barbarossa's (Conrad's successor) failure to deal with the Normans encouraged Manuel to take advantage of the multiple instabilities that existed in the Italian Peninsula. He sent Michael Palaiologos and John Doukas, both of whom held the high imperial rank of sebastos, with Byzantine troops, 10 Byzantine ships, and large quantities of gold to Apulia (1155). The two generals were instructed to enlist the support of Frederick Barbarossa, since he was hostile to the Normans of Sicily and was south of the Alps at the time, but he declined because his demoralised army longed to get back north of the Alps as soon as possible. Nevertheless, with the help of disaffected local barons including Count Robert of Loritello, Manuel's expedition achieved astonishingly rapid progress as the whole of southern Italy rose up in rebellion against the Sicilian Crown, and the untried William I. There followed a string of spectacular successes as numerous strongholds yielded either to force or the lure of gold.

William and his army landed on the peninsula and destroyed the Greek fleet (4 ships) and army at Brindisi on May 28, 1156, and recovered Bari. Pope Adrian IV came to terms at Benevento on June 18, 1156, where he and William signed the Treaty of Benevento, abandoning the rebels and confirming William as king. During the summer of 1157, he sent a fleet of 164 ships carrying 10,000 men to sack Euboea and Almira. In 1158 William made peace with the Romans.

=== Third Norman invasion of the Balkans (1185–1186) ===
Although the last invasions and last large scale conflict between the two powers lasted less than two years, the third Norman invasions came closer still to taking Constantinople. Then Byzantine Emperor Andronikos I Komnenos had allowed the Normans to go relatively unchecked towards Thessalonica. While David Komnenos had made some preparations in anticipation of the encroaching Normans, such as ordering reinforcement of the cities walls' and assigning four divisions to the cities' defense, these precautions proved insufficient. Only one of the four divisions actually engaged the Normans, resulting in the city being captured with relative ease by Norman forces. Upon gaining control of the city Norman forces sacked Thessalonica. The following panic resulted in a revolt placing Isaac II Angelos on the throne. In the aftermath of the fall of Andronikos, a reinforced Byzantine field army under Alexios Branas decisively defeated the Normans at the Battle of Demetritzes. Following this battle Thessalonica was speedily recovered and the Normans were pushed back to Italy. The exception was the County palatine of Cephalonia and Zakynthos, which remained in the hands of the Norman admiral Margaritus of Brindisi and his successors under the Kingdom of Sicily for three centuries until 1479, when it was captured by the Ottomans and later divided between the Ottomans and Republic of Venice.

== Aftermath ==
With the Normans unable to take the Balkans, they turned their attention to European affairs. The Byzantines meanwhile had not possessed the will or the resources for any Italian invasion since the days of Manuel Comnenus. After the third invasion, the survival of the Empire became more important to the Byzantines than a mere province on the other side of the Adriatic Sea. The death of William II, who was without an heir, threw the kingdom into instability and upheaval, and by 1194 the Hohenstaufen had taken power, themselves being replaced in 1266 by the Angevins. The successive Sicilian rulers would eventually continue the Norman policy of domination over post-Byzantine states in the Ionian Sea and Greece, attempting to assert suzerainty over Corfu, finally conquered in 1260, the County palatine of Cephalonia and Zakynthos, the Despotate of Epirus and other territories.

== General and cited sources ==
=== Primary ===
- Anna Comnena, translated by E. R. A. Sewter (1969). The Alexiad. London: Penguin Books. ISBN 0-14-044215-4.

=== Secondary ===
- Birkenmeier, John W. (2002). "The Campaigns of Manuel I Komnenos". The Development of the Komnenian Army: 1081–1180. Brill Academic Publishers. ISBN 90-04-11710-5.
- Brooke, Zachary Nugent (2004). "East and West:1155–1198". A History of Europe, from 911 to 1198. Routledge (UK). ISBN 0-415-22126-9.
- Charanis, Peter (1952). "Aims of the Medieval Crusades and How They Were Viewed by Byzantium". Church History. 21 (2). Cambridge University Press: 123–134. doi:10.2307/3161078. ISSN 0009-6407.
- Davis-Secord, Sarah C. (2017). Where three worlds met: Sicily in the early medieval Mediterranean. Ithaca (N.Y.): Cornell University Press. ISBN 978-1-5017-1259-3.
- Duggan, Anne J. (2003). "The Pope and the Princes". In Bolton, Brenda; Duggan, Anne J. (eds.). Adrian IV, the English Pope, 1154–1159: Studies and Texts. Ashgate Publishing, Ltd. ISBN 0-7546-0708-9.
- Fine, John V. A. Jr. (1991) [1983]. The Early Medieval Balkans: A Critical Survey from the Sixth to the Late Twelfth Century. Ann Arbor: University of Michigan Press. ISBN 0-472-08149-7.
- Loud, G. (1999). "Article. Coinage, wealth and plunder in the age of Robert Guiscard". The English Historical Review. 114 (458): 815–843. doi:10.1093/ehr/114.458.815. ISSN 0013-8266.
- Magdalino, Paul (2002). The Empire of Manuel I Komnenos, 1143–1180. Cambridge University Press. ISBN 0-521-52653-1.
- Magdalino, Paul (2004). "The Byzantine Empire (1118–1204)". In Luscombe, David; Riley-Smith, Jonathan (eds.). The New Cambridge Medieval History, Volume 4, c.1024–c.1198, Part 2. Cambridge: Cambridge University Press. pp. 611–643. ISBN 978-1-13905403-4.
- McQueen, William (1986). "Relations Between the Normans and Byzantium 1071–1112". Byzantion. 56: 427–490. JSTOR 44161007.
- Morris, Rosemary (1988). "Northern Europe Invades the Mediterranean, 900–1200". In Holmes, George (ed.). The Oxford Illustrated History of Medieval Europe. Oxford: Oxford University Press . pp. 175–234. ISBN 0192854356 – via Internet Archive.
- Norwich, John Julius (1995). Byzantium: The Decline and Fall. London: Viking. ISBN 0-670-82377-5.
- Rowe, John Gordon (1959). "The Papacy and the Greeks (1122-1153)". Church History. 28 (2). Cambridge University Press: 115–130. doi:10.2307/3161452. ISSN 0009-6407. JSTOR 3161452.
- Shepard, Jonathan (1973). "The English and Byzantium: A Study of Their Role in the Byzantine Army in the Later Eleventh Century". Traditio. 29: 53–92. JSTOR 27830955.
- Živković, Vojislav (2025). "About the First Contacts of Serbs and Normans: Archiriz of Bari, Father-in-law of King Constantine Bodin". Vizantijsko-slovenska čtenija. 8: 151–164.
