= Geoffrey of Hauteville (disambiguation) =

Geoffrey of Hauteville may refer to:

- Geoffrey of Hauteville, Count of the Capitanate
- Geoffrey of Hauteville, leper son of Roger I
- Geoffrey, Count of Ragusa
- Geoffrey of Hauteville, Count of Catanzaro
