= Robert of Loritello =

Robert of Loritello may refer to:

- Robert I of Loritello (died 1107), Italo-Norman nobleman, first count of Loritello (1061–1107)
- Robert II of Loritello (died 1134 or 1137), count of Loritello (1107-1137), son of Robert I
- Robert III of Loritello (died 1182), count of Loritello (1154–1182) and Conversano (1138–1182), not related to the others
