= Robert of Hauteville =

Robert of Hauteville may refer to:

- Robert Guiscard
- Robert Scalio
- Robert I of Loritello
- Robert II of Loritello
- Robert III of Loritello
