= Trani (disambiguation) =

Trani, Apulia is a comune in Italy.

Trani may also refer to:

== People ==
- Trani (surname), Italian surname
- Geoffrey of Trani (died 1245), Italian jurist
- Isaiah di Trani
- Isaiah di Trani the Younger
- Peter I of Trani
- Peter II of Trani

== Other ==
- Trani stone
- Trani Cup
- U.S. Calcio Trani
