= Miriarcha =

Miriarcha is the name given in the Chronicon breve normannicum to the Byzantine general who led the defence of the Catapanate of Italy in 1060–1062. The anonymous chronicler has, however, misinterpreted the Greek title merarches (commander of a division, merarch) as a name. The actual name of the general is unknown, and since the rank of merarches is not otherwise clearly attested in southern Italy his exact function is not known either. Probably the office was immediately below that of the catapan.

In the spring and summer of 1060, the Normans under Duke Robert Guiscard with his brothers Mauger and Roger conquered several cities in Byzantine Apulia and expelled the last Byzantine garrisons from Calabria. In response, the new Byzantine emperor Constantine X dispatched reinforcements under the command of a merarch. They arrived in Bari in October 1060.

Although his title implies that he had command of only a small army, the merarch managed to retake the cities of Taranto, Brindisi, Oria and Otranto. These were the first Byzantine victories over the Normans since the latter's arrival in southern Italy. In 1061, the merarch advanced north into Norman territory, laying siege to the walled town of Melfi in the heart of the Norman county. He was aided in this by the revolt of the city of Troia, which Guiscard had to besiege before he could turn his attention to the Byzantines.

In January 1061, reinforced by troops that had been fighting with Roger in Muslim Sicily, Guiscard took the Byzantine city of Acerenza and Roger took Manduria. Joining forces, they forced the merarch to raise the siege of Melfi. By February, the situation had been stabilized and Roger returned to Sicily. The merarch did not undertake any further offensive operations in 1061. That year, Constantine sent a new catapan, Maruli, the first to set foot in Italy since 1058. Overall command thus passed to the catapan and the position of the merarch was downgraded. In 1062, the Normans took the offensive, capturing Brindisi and Oria. The merarch was captured in the fighting at Brindisi. The annalist Lupus Protospatharius mentions this in his account of 1062.

The merarch has sometimes been identified with Abulchares, who was appointed catapan in 1064 according to the Anonymus Barensis. This identification is based on John Skylitzes, who makes Abulchares the Byzantine commander in 1061. In fact, the latter's dating is off and he is clearly referring to the same man as the Anonymus under 1064 and not to the merarch who arrived in 1060.
