= Peter of Trani =

Peter of Trani may refer to:

- Peter I of Trani (r. 1042 – 1057x1064)
- Peter II of Trani (r. 1064x1057 – 1081)
