= Abulchares =

11th Century Byzantine General

Abulchares (Greek: Αβουλχαρέ, Latin: Apochara; died 1068), also known as Abou-l-Khareg, was a Byzantine general who served as the catepan of Italy (Note: The Anonymi Barensis Chronicon refers to him as catepan, while the Skylitzes Continuatus uses "duke of Italy".) from 1064 until his death. The chief sources for his catapanate are Skylitzes Continuatus and Anonymi Barensis Chronicon. Skylitzes Continuatus records that Abulchares was also duke (doux) of Dyrrhachium across the Adriatic, but this is chronologically impossible, since Perenos is recorded as duke at this time. (Note: The Skylitzes Continuatus names Perenos as Abulchares' successor as duke of Dyrrhachium and Italy. More likely, Perenos was Abulchares' superior; both leaders negotiated with the Normans.) François Lenormant described Abulchares as either a Maronite or Mardaite. Vera von Falkenhausen argued that he was an Arab, interpreting the name Abulchares as the Greek version of Al-Hasan. (Note: von Falkenhausen 1967, p. 94: "A. war wahrscheinlich arabischer Herkunft, denn Abulchares (Kedr. II 359) bzw. Bulchiasenes (Chron. Siculo-Sarac. 41) ist die griechische Namensform für das Emir Al-Hasan, der die Byzantiner 952 bei Gerace schlug." [A. was probably of Arab origin, since Abulchares (Kedr. II 359), or Bulchiasenes (Chron. Sicula-Sarac. 41), is the Greek form of the name of the Emir al-Hasan, who defeated the Byzantines in 952 at Gerace.])

Abulchares arrived in southern Italy in 1064, when the Normans were in control of much of the former Catepanate. His task was to travel about Apulia shoring up the defences of the scattered towns still loyal to the Byzantines. In 1064, he took Herman of Hauteville as a hostage for the loyalty of his brother, Abelard of Hauteville, who had rebelled with Byzantine support against their uncle, Duke Robert Guiscard, over a disputed inheritance. The rebellion was quickly put down. In 1066 an army was sent to Italy under Maurex and by 1067 he had recaptured the Norman-occupied cities of Brindisi and Taranto. Abulchares appointed strategoi equipped with reinforcements to defend the towns. Nikephoros Karantenos, the strategos who defended Brindisi from the Normans in 1070, may have been one of Abulchares' appointees. By 1068, Otranto had also been recovered.

Abulchares died in 1068, the same year as the former catepan Argyrus. Their deaths were a blow to the Byzantines. After his death, Bari, which he had resupplied, was besieged and taken by the Normans under Robert Guiscard. Perenos was appointed catepan, but was unable to cross the sea. According to Amatus of Montecassino, a catepan named Avartutele came to Bari in 1069 and sent for a relief force. There is no other record of a catepan of this name, and it may be an error for Abulchares, who was already dead when the siege began.

== Sources ==
- Chalandon, Ferdinand (1907). Histoire de la domination normande en Italie et en Sicilie. Vol. 1. Paris: Alphonse Picard et fils.
- Dickert, Christopher Henry (2014). Byzantium, Political Agency, and the City: A Case Study in Urban Autonomy During the Norman Conquest of Southern Italy (MA thesis). Simon Fraser University.
- Gay, Jules (1904). L'Italie méridionale et l'Empire byzantin depuis l'avènement de Basile 1^{er} jusqu'à la prise de Bari par les Normands (867–1071). Paris: Albert Fontemoing.
- Lenormant, François (1883). À travers l'Apulie et la Lucanie. A. Lévy.
- Manselli, Raoul (1960). "Altavilla, Ermanno d'". Dizionario Biografico degli Italiani. Vol. 2. Rome: Istituto dell'Enciclopedia Italiana.
- von Falkenhausen, Vera (1967). Untersuchungen über die byzantinische Herrschaft in Süditalien vom 9. bis ins 11. Jahrhundert. O. Harrassowitz.

Preceded by Sirianus	Catepan of Italy; 1064–1068	Succeeded by Perenos
