= Joscelin of Molfetta =

Norman count of Molfetta

Joscelin (or Jocelyn) was a Norman count of Molfetta on the Adriatic coast of southern Italy. He rejected the leadership of Duke Robert Guiscard and rebelled, perhaps as early as 1064, certainly by 1067. Defeated, he went over the Byzantines in 1068.

There is some evidence Joscelin was given a command in Greece. In 1071, he led a fleet to relieve the Norman siege of Bari but was intercepted and captured. He ended his life in captivity. Through his daughter, name unknown, his descendants continued to rule Molfetta into the next century.

== Early career ==
The Old French translator of Amatus of Montecassino calls him Gazoline de la Blace. Geoffrey Malaterra calls him Gocelinus de Orencho, which may mean that he belonged to the Hareng family. He has even been identified with a certain Joscelin de Hareng, who prevented a young Robert Guiscard from physically attacking his elder brother, Count Humphrey of Apulia, during a heated argument in the early 1050s.

On 26 June 1066 in Molfetta, Joscelin and his son-in-law, Amicus, made a donation to the monastery of the Santissima Trinità in Venosa. The charter refers to Joscelin as a count. (Note: Gozzulino comite de Molfetta) Besides the port city of Molfetta, he also received from Duke Robert the lordship of Barletta, which had belonged to Count Peter I of Trani until the latter's death (before 1064).

== Revolt ==
The Anonymous Chronicle of Bari records that in 1064 Leo Perenos, the Byzantine governor of Dyrrhachium across the Adriatic, began luring Norman nobles into Byzantine allegiance with "rewards". The most prominent among them was Joscelin. According to the Chronicle, he then led a fleet in an engagement with a Norman fleet sent from Calabria (where Duke Robert was at the time), setting fire to a chelandion. This has traditionally been regarded as the beginning of the first revolt against Robert Guiscard's rule, but it has more recently been argued that the Chronicle mis-dates the events of 1067 to 1064. An alternative interpretation sees the events of 1064 as not directly related to the rebellion that broke out three years later.

Joscelin was certainly involved in the revolt of 1067–68, in which his son-in-law joined, as well as Count Geoffrey of Conversano and Abelard, Count Humphre's son and thus Duke Robert's nephew. Joscelin is reported to have given two of his sons to Perenos as hostages for his loyalty in exchange for money to finance the revolt. By early 1068 Duke Robert had defeated the rebels and Joscelin, along with another leader, Roger Toutebove, fled to Constantinople, capital of the Byzantine empire. His son-in-law, however, was pardoned and apparently able to maintain control of Molfetta.

== In Byzantine service ==
According to Malaterra, Joscelin was a favourite of the Emperor Romanos IV Diogenes "because he was resolute in arms and versed in strategy". When narrating the events of 1071, Malaterra calls him Joscelin "of Corinth", (Note: Gozelinus de Corintho) suggesting perhaps that he had been given a command in Hellas by the emperor. Later Italian chronicles give him the title duke.

In February 1071, Joscelin led a last-ditch effort to relieve the Siege of Bari, which Robert Guiscard had begun in August 1068 after crushing the Apulian rebellion. According to Amatus, Joscelin was carrying lots of gold and other valuables with which to bribe the besiegers. His fleet of twenty ships embarked from Dyrrhachium intending to run the Norman blockade of Bari. Spotted at night by the two lanterns on Joscelin's flagship, it was intercepted by the fleet of Count Roger I of Sicily and defeated in the rare case of a battle at sea fought at night. Joscelin's flagship was captured in the action and another ship was sunk. Amatus records nine vessels captured in total. What was not sunk or captured limped into Bari's harbour. This was the first Norman naval victory in the Mediterranean. According to William of Apulia, "the Norman race had up to this point known nothing of naval warfare. But by thus returning victorious they very much enhanced their leader's confidence..." Following the defeat of the relief squadron, Bari surrendered in April 1071. According to Geoffrey Malaterra, Joscelin was "attired wonderfully in the Greek style" at the time of his capture and thus was he paraded before the besieging troops.

According to William of Apulia, following his capture "Joscelin led an unhappy life shut up in prison for a long time; he went through many travails and his sufferings continued until the end of his life."

== Sources ==
- Amatus of Montecassino (2004). Prescott Dunbar, trans.; Graham Loud (eds.). The History of the Normans. Boydell.
- Brown, Gordon S. (2003). The Norman Conquest of Southern Italy and Sicily. McFarland.
- Brown, Paul (2013). "Perceptions of Byzantine Virtus in Southern Italy, from the Eighth to Eleventh Centuries". In Bronwen Neil; Lynda Garland (eds.). Questions of Gender in Byzantine Society. Ashgate. pp. 11–28.
- Brown, Paul (2016). Mercenaries to Conquerors: Norman Warfare in the Eleventh- and Twelfth-Century Mediterranean. Pen & Sword Military.
- Chalandon, Ferdinand (1907). Histoire de la domination normande en Italie et en Sicile (in French). Vol. 2 vols. Paris: A. Picard.
- Jahn, Wolfgang (1989). Untersuchungen zur normannischen Herrschaft in Suditalien (1040–1100) (in German). Peter Lang.
- Loud, Graham (2000). The Age of Robert Guiscard: Southern Italy and the Norman Conquest. Harlow: Pearson Educational.
- Stanton, Charles (2011). Norman Naval Operations in the Mediterranean. Boydell & Brewer.
- Stanton, Charles (2015). Medieval Maritime Warfare. Pen & Sword Maritime.
