= Constantine the Philosopher =

Constantine the Philosopher may refer to:

- Cyril, born Constantine, of Saints Cyril and Methodius, 9th-century Byzantine scholar born in Thessaloniki
- Constantine of Nicaea, 12th-century Byzantine philosopher
- Constantine of Kostenets (died after 1431), Bulgarian historian and biographer of Stefan Lazarević
