= Sirianus =

Sirianus was the Byzantine catapan of Italy, the second appointed by the Emperor Constantine X Doukas. He arrived in Bari, the seat of the catapanate, in 1061 or 1062, replacing Marules, who had been appointed the previous year. Constantine was the last emperor who took an interest in recovering ground in Italy, but Sirianus was on the defensive against the Norman state and recovered no territory. According to the annals of Lupus Protospatharius, the Norman duke Robert Guiscard captured Oria and Brindisi in the year of his appointment and Taranto in the following year. He was succeeded in 1064 by Abulchares.

The date of Sirianus's arrival in Bari can be placed between 1 September 1061 and 31 August 1062 because the only source, the Latin Anonymous Chronicle of Bari, uses the Byzantine calendar. The name Sirianus is a Latinization of the Italianized form Siriano found in the chronicle. It is uncertain whether it represents the Byzantine Greek name Syrianos (Συριανός) or Syrgiannes (Συργιάννης).

Preceded by Marules	Catepan of Italy; 1061/1062	Succeeded by Abulchares
