= Michael Maurex =

11th century naval commander

Maurex or Maurikas (Greek: Μαύρηξ/Μαυρίκας) was a Byzantine naval commander active in the latter half of the 11th century, chiefly in the Byzantine–Norman Wars. His identity is not certain, as several different people are habitually identified as the same person: a "Maurex" who was a wealthy sailor and magnate from Heraclea Pontica, an admiral called in Latin sources Mambrita or Mambrica who was active against the Normans in the 1060s and 1080s, and Michael Maurex, a general and governor known through his seals.

According to Nikephoros Bryennios, Maurex was of humble origin, a native of Heraclea Pontica, and extremely experienced in naval matters. This made him, in Bryennios's words, "indispensable" to the Byzantine Empire, and he was given many gifts by the emperors, amassing a huge fortune. The general Michael Maurex is first attested in c. 1050 as carrying the lowly dignity of ostiarios, and a number of seals trace his gradual advancement, to hypatos and patrikios, vestes and strategos of Chios, vestarches and katepano of Dyrrhachium, magistros, proedros and doux of the Bucellarian Theme, to kouropalates and doux of Antioch.

In the Oxford Dictionary of Byzantium, Alexander Kazhdan accepts the identity of the magnate Maurex and the admiral, but considers the equation with Michael Maurex doubtful as the former is not recorded as bearing any of the latter's titles. Similarly, Michael Hendy doubts the identification of the magnate Maurex, "a private person", with any of the military commanders identified as him, but considers the general Michael Maurex and the naval commander as the same person.

In 1066, according to the Breve chronicon Northmannicum, Maurex (Mambrica/Mambrita) commanded a fleet that stopped an attempted invasion of the Balkans by Count Geoffrey of Taranto, and in the next year, at the head of a Byzantine army he landed in Apulia and took Bari, Taranto and Castellaneta from the Normans. He could not prevent the Normans from besieging Bari again in 1068, however, and in 1070, he is recorded as fighting against Geoffrey and Robert Guiscard.

Around 1076, according to Bryennios, Maurex hosted the future emperor Alexios I Komnenos at his estate in Heraclea. Alexios was then still a general campaigning against the Seljuk Turks, and Maurex provided him with many troops drawn from his large personal armed retinue and his servants.

Maurex is next recorded by Anna Komnene, without further comment, as leading a joint Byzantine-Venetian fleet to victory over the Normans in spring 1082. He appears for the last time in 1084, when he is briefly mentioned (dux Mabrica) by William of Apulia as commander of the Byzantine fleet stationed at Corfu.

== Sources ==
- Hendy, Michael F. (2008) [1985]. Studies in the Byzantine Monetary Economy c. 300-1450. Cambridge: Cambridge University Press. ISBN 978-0-521-08852-7.
- Kazhdan, Alexander (1991). "Maurex". In Kazhdan, Alexander (ed.). The Oxford Dictionary of Byzantium. Oxford and New York: Oxford University Press. pp. 1317–1318. ISBN 0-19-504652-8.
- Skoulatos, Basile (1980). Les personnages byzantins de l'Alexiade: Analyse prosopographique et synthèse [The Byzantine Personalities of the Alexiad: Prosopographical Analysis and Synthesis] (in French). Louvain-la-Neuve and Louvain: Bureau du Recueil Collège Érasme and Éditions Nauwelaerts.
- Stephenson, Paul (2000). Byzantium's Balkan Frontier: A Political Study of the Northern Balkans, 900–1204. Cambridge: Cambridge University Press. ISBN 0-521-77017-3.

Preceded by Isaac Komnenos	Doux of Antioch; 1078 (?)	Succeeded by Vasak Pahlavouni
