= Trani (surname) =

Trani is a surname. Notable people with the surname include:

- Andrea Trani (born 1977), Italian yacht racer
- Barisano da Trani, Italian sculptor
- Bruno Trani (1928–2022), Italian sailor
- Eugene P. Trani (born 1939), American historian and educator
- Fabiana Trani (born 1963), Italian harpist
- Guillaume Trani (born 1997), French soccer player
- John Trani, American executive
- Joseph Trani, Talmudist of the latter part of the 16th century who lived in Greece
- Leon Trani (1920–1966), Filipino boxer
- Luciano Trani (born 1966), Australian soccer player
- Vincenzo Trani (born 1974), Italian businessman

== See also ==
- Trani (disambiguation)
