= Punta del Diavolo Lighthouse =

Lighthouse in Italy

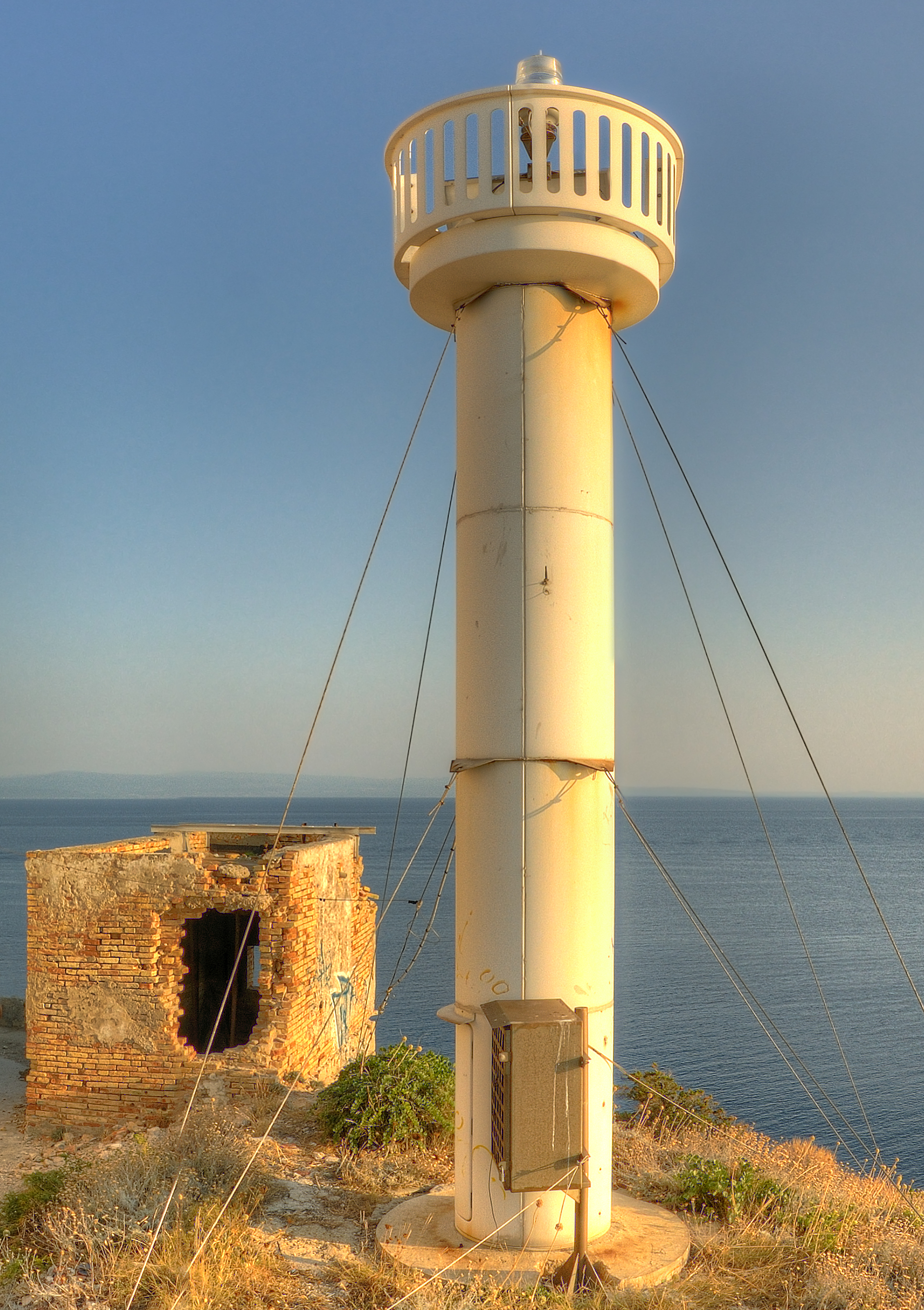
- Location: Tremiti Islands, Italy
- Coordinates: 42°06′23″N 15°28′38″E

Tower
- Construction: concrete (foundation), fiberglass (tower)
- Height: 4 m (13 ft)
- Shape: cylinder
- Markings: White
- Power source: solar power
- Operator: Italian Navy

Light
- First lit: 1990s
- Focal height: 48 m (157 ft)
- Range: 11 nmi (20 km; 13 mi)
- Characteristic: Fl(3) W 10s
- Original light
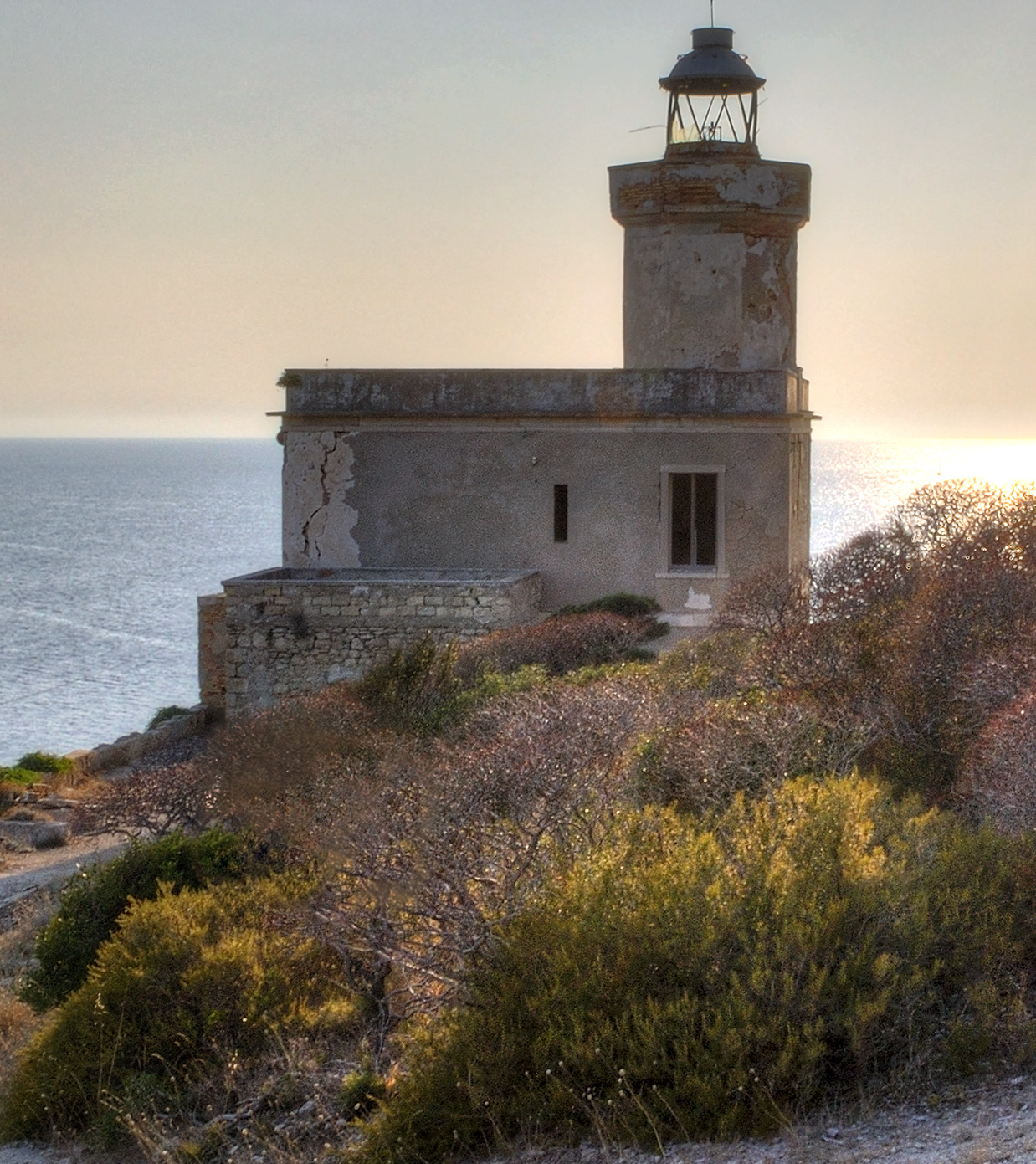
- Constructed: 1905
- Construction: stone
- Height: 9 m (30 ft)
- Shape: octagonal prism
- Markings: White (tower), grey (dome)
- Deactivated: 1987

Punta del Diavolo Lighthouse (Italian: Faro di Punta del Diavolo) is an active lighthouse located on the western point of Isola San Domino, one of the Tremiti in Apulia on the Adriatic Sea.

== Description ==
The first lighthouse was built in 1905 and consists of a white octagonal prism stone tower, 9 feet (2.7 m) high, with balcony and lantern, rising from a 2-storey white keeper's house. On November 8, 1987, a mysterious explosion damaged the lighthouse, but the keeper, Domenico Calabrese, was off duty and survived. The lighthouse remained inactive until the 1990s. when a new white cylindrical fibreglass tower, 4 metres (13 ft) high, with light and gallery was established. The lantern, positioned at 48 metres (157 ft) above sea level, emits three white flashes in a 10 seconds period, visible up to a distance of 11 nautical miles (20 km; 13 mi). The lighthouse is completely automated, powered by a solar unit and is managed by the Marina Militare with the identification code number 3844 E.F.

== See also ==
- List of lighthouses in Italy
- Tremiti
