= Geoffrey of Hauteville, Count of the Capitanate =

Norman military leader and Noble

Geoffrey of Hauteville
- Count of the Capitanate
- Predecessor: Mauger
- Noble family: Hauteville
- Spouses: Unnamed (1), Theodora (2)
- Issue: see below
- Father: Tancred
- Mother: Muriella

Geoffrey of Hauteville (died between 1059 and 1071) was a Norman military leader and Count of the Capitanate, son of Tancred of Hauteville by his first wife Muriella.

== Birth order ==
Goffredo Malaterra lists Geoffrey as Tancred's fourth son by Muriella. The Annales of Romuald Guarna, instead, show him as the second son. Orderic Vitalis, finally, records that Geoffrey was the one that inherited his father's possessions, suggesting that he was the oldest son. This looks like an error from Orderic's part, as it was Serlo, not Geoffrey, that stayed in Normandy and inherited Tancred's possessions. Orderic's record, however, could denote a possible last-minute change of plan, due to a murder that forced Serlo to flee to Brittany, making him unable to inherit his father's lands and making Geoffrey the next in line. If this is the case, then Geoffrey is indeed Tancred's second son by Muriella as recorded by Romuald Guarna.

== Life ==
Geoffrey arrived in Southern Italy around 1053, together with his half-brothers Mauger and William of the Principate. When Mauger died, his fiefs passed to William, who in turn gifted them to Geoffrey. In this way, Geoffrey became Count of the Capitanate.

In 1059 Geoffrey asked his younger brother, Robert Guiscard, to help him suppress a rebellion that arose in the region of “Tetium” (in Abruzzi). Robert in turn asked their younger brother, Roger of Sicily, to also help them; together, Robert and Roger mobilized their armies and helped Geoffrey in capturing the fortress of Guilmi (Guillimacum). They succeeded and took as prisoner the commander of the fortress, a certain Walter, together with his sister. Walter's eyes were gauged out to prevent him from rebelling again.

Goffredo Malaterra records that after taking the fortress of Guilmi, Geoffrey died in battle near Chieti. The Breve Chronicon Northmannicum records that a “count Geoffrey” died in 1063. However, this information is not reliable as there were different counts named Geoffrey in that period, so we can't know for sure of which of these the chronicon is talking about. It is certain that Geoffrey of Hauteville died before 1071.

== Marriage and issue ==
From a marriage that occurred in Normandy, Geoffrey had four sons:

- Robert I, Count of Loritello
- Ralph, Count of Catanzaro
- Drogo (nicknamed Tasso)
- William, from whom the Rosso (family) descends

In southern Italy, Geoffrey married a niece of Guaimar IV of Salerno (and daughter of Pandulf of Capaccio), named Theodora. This second marriage produced a son:

- Tancred.

Different sources also claim that from “Geoffrey, one of Tancred’s sons” descends the Guarna / Avarna family. However, Geoffrey's sons in these sources are described as Counts of Marsico. It is thus probable that the sources are mistaken when they talk about a son of Tancred, and that they're actually referring to Geoffrey, Count of Ragusa, and not this Geoffrey, as the ancestor of the Avarna family.

== Sources ==
- Chalandon, Ferdinand. Histoire de la domination normande en Italie et en Sicile. Paris, 1907.
- Norwich, John Julius. The Normans in the South 1016-1130. Longmans: London, 1967.
