= Marules =

Marules (also spelled Marolos or Maruli) was the Byzantine catepan of Italy in 1060/1061. Appointed by the Emperor Constantine X, he arrived in Bari between 1 September 1060 and 31 August 1061, according to the Anonymous Chronicle of Bari. He was the first catepan appointed after Argyros left Italy in 1058. He had been preceded in 1060 by a merarches, but the latter's offensive against the Normans had peaked before his arrival and he adopted a defensive posture.

Marules was succeeded by Sirianus, who arrived in Bari between 1 September 1061 and 31 August 1062.

Preceded by Argyros	Catepan of Italy; 1060/1061	Succeeded by Sirianus
