= Geoffrey of Taranto =

Italo-Norman military leader and the first Count of Taranto

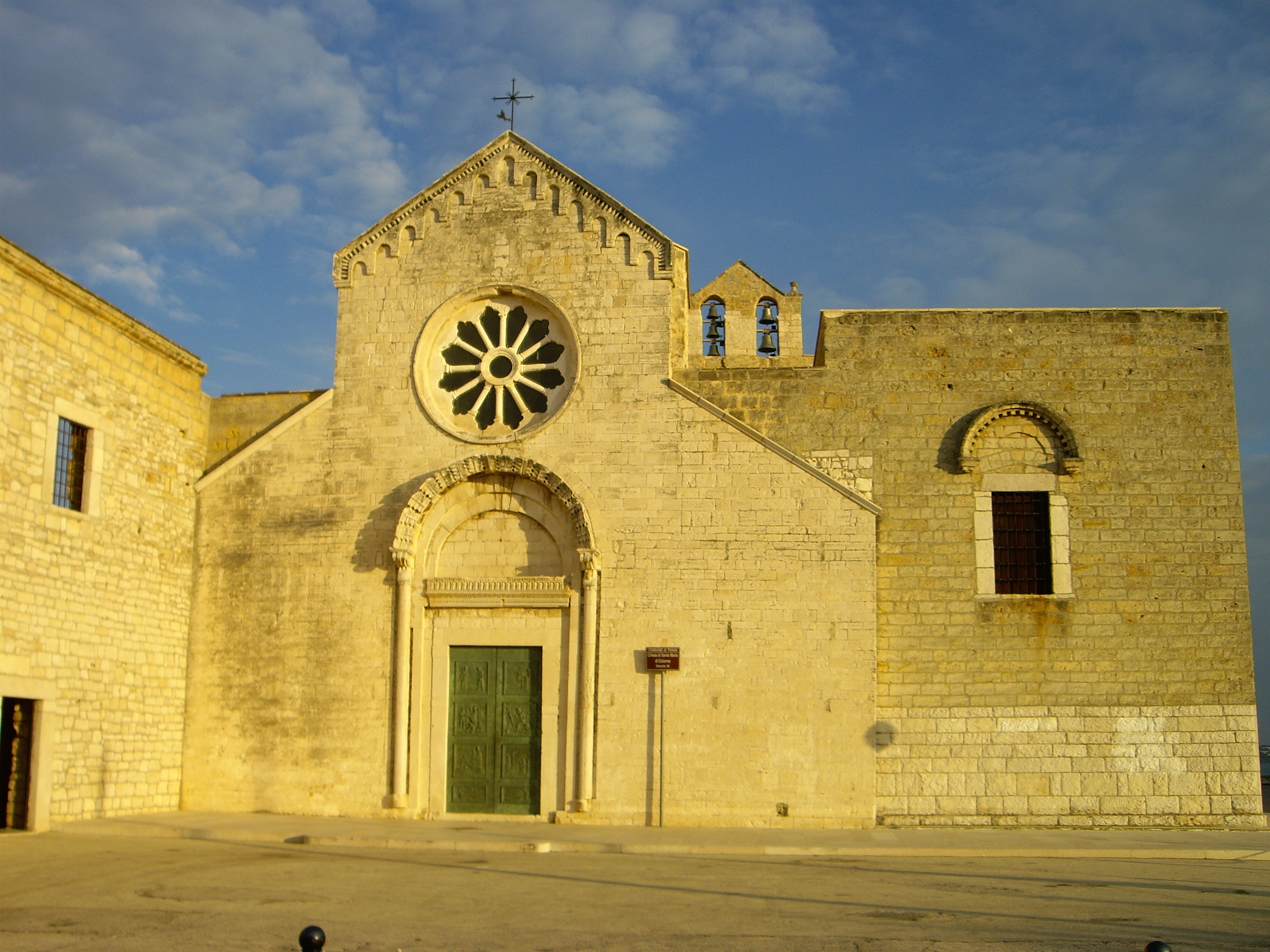
The Romanesque monastery of Santa Maria di Colonna in Trani, founded by Geoffrey.

Geoffrey, Godfrey, or Goffredo (died 1068x1072), called Lofredus in Latin, was an Italo-Norman military leader and the first Count of Taranto. He was the second son of Peter I of Trani, though of his elder brother, Amicus, nothing is known. He succeeded his father in the territory of Trani and was in control of it in 1064, though the city itself remained with the Byzantine Empire. His younger brother, Peter II, took the city from the Byzantines in 1054 and, taking advantage of Geoffrey's absence, took control of the patrimony. Geoffrey married a daughter of Drogo, lord of Mottola and Castellaneta.

When Count Drogo of Apulia was assassinated in 1051, Geoffrey was put in charge of his young son, Richard. Geoffrey founded, probably on the site of an existing hermitage, the monastery of Santa Maria di Colonna, populating it with Cassinese monks and building it a defensive tower that still stands.

In May 1063 Geoffrey conquered Taranto, which he eventually made his chief city. He took the title comes (Greek κόμης), as recorded in Lupus Protospatharius (LIX.34, 38–9) and the Strategikon of Kekaumenos (116.3). In 1064, according to the Anonymus Barensis (§152), he took Otranto (Idrontum) through a ruse after several failed attempts to take it by force. The city was being defended by Malapetzes (Malapezza) with an army of Varangians and Rus'. His niece lived in an old house against the city walls. Geoffrey got in contact with this niece, sent her gifts, and promised to marry her if she allowed his Normans to enter the city through her house. Using ropes during the night, she helped the enemy troops in. On finding the city lost, Malapetzes fled by sea, leaving behind his wife and children.

In 1066 Geoffrey made the first Norman attempt on the Balkans (Romania). Assembling a large army for the task he was met near Bari and stopped by Michael Maurikas, who had come by ship with a Varangian army (Wolff, 19–20).

On account of the rivalry between Peter II and Robert Guiscard, Geoffrey returned to Trani and took charge of it. He died there not long after, probably in 1068. He left a son, Richard, as his heir, but Peter quickly dispossessed him of Trani, leaving him only Andria.

In Amatus of Montecassino there is a reference to Peter II's brother Falgutce, but this must be a copyist's error, as no such brother is otherwise known and the event with which he is associated occurred after Geoffrey's death.
