= Michael Palaiologos Doukas =

Byzantine aristocrat (??–1156)

Michael Palaiologos Doukas (Greek: Μιχαήλ Παλαιολόγος Δούκας, died 1156) was an early member of the family of the Palaiologoi, which later ruled the Byzantine Empire.

Michael has often been identified as a son of the dynasty's ancestor, George Palaiologos, and his wife Anna Doukaina, a sister-in-law of Emperor Alexios I Komnenos, but his late chronology militates against this view. In all likelihood he was one of their grandsons, likely a son of Nikephoros Palaiologos, the eldest son of George Palaiologos and Anna Doukaina. It is from his grandmother that Michael derived his second surname, "Doukas".

According to the historian John Kinnamos, Michael for an unknown reason fell into disfavour with his cousin, Emperor John II Komnenos (r. 1118–1143) and was exiled, being recalled only after the accession of Manuel I Komnenos (r. 1143–1180). Michael may have lived in southern Greece or have possessed property there, as he is known to have come into conflict with the local governor, Joseph Balsamon, in the 1140s. By 1147, Michael held the high court rank of sebastos and was sent as an envoy, along with the chartoularios (secretary) Basil Tzintziloukes, to secure the supply for the forces of the Second Crusade near Sardica, and welcome King Louis VII of France.

In spring 1155, Michael and another sebastos, John Doukas, were put in charge of an expedition to attempt the reconquest of southern Italy, formerly a Byzantine province, from the Italo-Normans. Initially the two Byzantines were to attempt to conclude an alliance with the Holy Roman Emperor, Frederick I Barbarossa, but if the latter refused—as indeed transpired—to use the considerable funds they had brought with them to raise mercenaries locally and recover Apulia. The two Byzantines found local allies in the persons of disgruntled Norman lords, Count Robert III of Loritello and the former Count of Gravina, Alexander of Conversano. With Ancona as their base of operations, Palaiologos and Doukas captured Vieste, Bari, Trani, and Giovinazzo in summer 1155. Palaiologos defeated a Norman army under Asclettin of Andria near Barletta, after which Andria surrendered. In October of the same year, Palaiologos carried out negotiations with the Republic of Genoa.

In spring 1156, Michael fell ill. He was tonsured a monk with the monastic name of Moses, a few days before his death at Bari. John Doukas assumed command of the Imperial forces in Apulia.

== Sources ==
- Birkenmeier, John W. (2002). The Development of the Komnenian Army: 1081–1180. Leiden: Brill. ISBN 90-04-11710-5.
- Polemis, Demetrios I. (1968). The Doukai: A Contribution to Byzantine Prosopography. London: The Athlone Press.
- Vannier, Jean-François (1986). "Les premiers Paléologues. Étude généalogique et prosopographique" [The First Palaiologoi. Genealogical and Prosopographical Study]. In Cheynet, Jean-Claude; Vannier, Jean-François (eds.). Études Prosopographiques [Prosopographic Studies] (in French). Paris: Publications de la Sorbonne. pp. 123–186. ISBN 978-2-85944-110-4. OCLC 575241198.
