= Constantine of Nicaea =

Byzantine philosopher

Constantine of Nicaea or Constantine the Philosopher was a Neoplatonic philosopher in the Byzantine Empire during the reign of Manuel I (1143–1180).

Only two of Constantine's works survive, both written in Greek and preserved in the 13th-century codex Escorialensis graecus 256 (olim Y.II.10). One is a consolatory oration addressed to the megas hetaireiarches John Doukas on the death of his wife. Doukas took office between 1166 and 1170 and left it in 1182. Constantine praises Doukas' wife for her ascetic virtues, which he calls "real philosophy", as opposed to the academic kind he pursues.

Constantine's other work is a short philosophical treatise or logos (λόγος). Constantine demonstrates a certain originality of thought in his use of philosophical terms not attested elsewhere: εὐμεταδοσία (eumetadosia, generosity) and ἀλληλοδοσία (allelodosia, reciprocity). As he was writing at the time of an anti-Neoplatonist reaction, he may have been seeking a more Orthodox terminology than that condemned at the Council of Blachernae in 1157. His central claim is that, in the words of Merle Eisenberg and David Jenkins, "reciprocated generosity is the fundamental principle at work in Nature."

All the biographical data on Constantine is what can be derived from his surviving works. He was evidently well educated and in touch with the highest levels of Byzantine society. John Doukas was possibly a patron and he may have belonged to the school of adherents of Proclus attacked by Nicholas of Methone in the 1150s. Robert Browning identified Constantine of Nicaea as the subject of the anonymous epigram "To Constantine the Consul of Philosophers", but a more likely identification is with Michael Psellos, who became consul of the philosophers in 1047 while still known by his birth name, Constantine.
