= William of Loritello =

William (Guglielmo di Loritello) has been the 3rd Count of Loritello (today Rotello). The Loritello's counts had become so mighty that they used to call themselves Count of Counts; as the first son of Count Robert II° he succeeded his father in 1137. About his brief ruling they have few news. Immediately after his investiture, the Emperor Lothair II descended to Italy to thwart the pretensions of Roger II of Sicily who wanted to subdue the southern Italy. On the river Tronto, William did homage to Lothair and opened his countdom, along with the strategic town of Termoli, to the Imperial Army. In this he joined Count Hugh II of Molise. Lothair, after an easy victory against King Roger, came back to Germany at once, but died while crossing Alps Mountains. Roger, then, gathered a larger army and invaded southern Italy again, this time succeeding in his campaign. Nothing more was heard of William, disappeared from History, literally. Twenty years later the countdom of Loritello was given to the family Bassunvilla.

== Sources ==
- Molise in the Norman period.

Preceded by Robert II	Count of Loritello; 1137	Succeeded by Robert III
