= Battle of Gerace =

Battle of Gerace (952)
- Part of the Arab–Byzantine wars and the Muslim conquest of Sicily
Date	7 May 952
Location	Gerace, Calabria in Italy
Result	Fatimid victory

Belligerents
Byzantine Empire	Fatimid Caliphate; Emirate of Sicily

Commanders and leaders
Patrician Malakinos †; Strategos Paschalios	Al-Hasan ibn Ali al-Kalbi; Faraj Muhaddad

Strength
Large	7,000 cavalry 5,000 infantry

Casualties and losses
Heavy	Unknown

The Battle of Gerace was a military engagement between the Fatimid-Sicilian army and the Byzantine empire near the city of Gerace. The Arabs routed the Byzantines who launched a campaign against Sicily.

== Background ==
In the 10th century, the Fatimid Caliphate faced unrest. In Africa, the revolt of Abu Yazid in Africa and the unrest in Sicily prevented them from undertaking any campaigns against the Byzantine Empire. Many rebels escaped to Agrigento, where they took refuge. When the unrest in Sicily and the rebellion of Abu Yazid were over, Caliph al-Mansur Billah (or his governor of Sicily) sent a request to the emperor seeking the surrender of the deserters and the resumption of tribute payments. The Byzantine emperor, Constantine VII, refused this request; thus, hostilities were resumed.

It was the Byzantines who first initiated a campaign against the Arabs, sending an army to Italy that landed at Otranto. The commander of this army was the patrician Malakinos, and the fleet was led by Makroïoannis. The governor of Sicily, Al-Hasan ibn Ali al-Kalbi, having received news of the Byzantine landing, sent a request for reinforcements to the Caliph, who dispatched a fleet carrying 7,000 cavalry and 5,000 infantry led by Faraj Muhaddad.

== Prelude ==
On the 2nd of July, 951, the Fatimid reinforcements arrived in Palermo, and by the 12th, the combined Fatimid-Sicilian army, under the overall command of Hasan, had set out for Messina. Then, crossing the Strait, it approached Reggio Calabria, whose inhabitants had already abandoned the city at the approach of the combined army. After ravaging the surrounding regions, the combined army marched towards the cities of Gerace and Cassano all'Ionio, securing money and hostages from them. The Fatimids then retreated to Messina to spend the winter.

== Battle ==
In the spring of 952, the Fatimids, on the Caliph's orders, crossed back into Italy, where, on the 7th of May, a fierce and decisive battle took place before the city of Gerace. Although the Byzantines outnumbered the Fatimid-Sicilian army, they suffered a complete rout; the Fatimids pursued them until nightfall, killing and capturing many prisoners; a large quantity of weapons, horses, and baggage fell in the hands of the Arabs; the patrician Malakinos himself fell in the battle, and the other leaders narrowly escaped capture; Paschalios, strategos of Calabria, barely managed to flee. The heads of the dead were sent to Sicily and Africa. Many senior officers were captured.

== Aftermath ==
After the Byzantine defeat, the emperor requested a truce with the emir of Sicily. The tribute payments were continued. Before the Fatimids left Calabria to spend the winter in Messina, they built a mosque in Reggio and imposed a condition on the Byzantines: they should not prevent the Muslims from using it. Any Muslim prisoner of war who escaped to the mosque was to enjoy asylum. Should the Byzantines dare to attack it, all churches in Sicily would be demolished. The Byzantines accepted.

== Sources ==
- Alexander Vasiliev (1968), Byzantium and the Arabs, Vol. 2: Political relations between Byzantines and Arabs during the Macedonian Dynasty (In French).
- John Wortley (2010), John Skylitzes: A Synopsis of Byzantine History, 811–1057.
- Heinz Halm (1996), The Empire of the Mahdi, The Rise of the Fatimids.
