= Robert, Count of Montescaglioso =

Robert (died July 1080) was the first Norman count of Montescaglioso.

Robert had a brother, Geoffrey of Conversano. Their mother was a sister of Duke Robert Guiscard.

Along with his brother Geoffrey and his cousins, Abelard and Herman, Robert was constantly in rebellion against his uncle the duke. In April 1064, Robert joined Abelard, Geoffrey, and Joscelin, Lord of Molfetta, in rebellion against Robert, who had just left for Sicily. They received the aid, financial and military, of Perenos, the Byzantine duke of Durazzo. Between 1 September 1065 and 31 August 1066, Byzantine troops landed at Bari. The rebels held out for several years, neither making headway against Robert nor he against them. On 1 January 1068, Romanus Diogenes was acclaimed emperor in Constantinople and the Greeks transferred their military attention to the Seljuk threat to their east. The rebellion fell apart and by February Robert had surrendered.

In 1071, with Abelard, and in 1078, with his cousin Prince Jordan I of Capua, Robert was in rebellion again. Robert and his brother and cousins continued in rebellion after the 1079 peace between Jordan and the Guiscard. Robert was one of the first to cease revolting: he died in July 1080. He left a son, Rudolf, who succeeded him.

== Sources ==
- Lexikon de Mittelalters.
- Norwich, John Julius. The Normans in the South 1016-1130. Longmans: London, 1967.
