= Geoffrey (leper son of Roger I) =

11th-century Italian noble

Geoffrey the Leper was a son of Roger I, Count of Sicily, by either his first wife Judith of Évreux, or his second wife Eremburga of Mortain. Geoffrey Malaterra records that he suffered from leprosy (“morbus elephantinus”). Secluded, he lived in isolation in a remote monastery. Malaterra also records that in 1089 he and his brother Jordan were betrothed to two sisters of Adelaide del Vasto, their father's third wife, but that Geoffrey died before the marriage could take place.

This Geoffrey is not to be mistaken with his illegitimate brother, Geoffrey of Ragusa, who was granted a county, married and had offspring.
