= Tremiti Islands =

Tremiti Islands Isole Tremiti (Italian)
- Comune
- Comune di Isole Tremiti
- A view of San Nicola island from the nearby San Domino island, with the Abbey of Santa Maria a Mare fortified complex.

- Coat of arms

- Tremiti within the Province of Foggia

- Location within Italy Location within Apulia
- Coordinates: 42°07′N 15°30′E
- Country: Italy
- Region: Apulia
- Province: Foggia (FG)
- Frazioni: Isola San Nicola, Isola San Domino

Government
  - Mayor: Antonio Fentini

Area
  - Total: 3.18 km^{2} (1.23 sq mi)
- Elevation: 70 m (230 ft)

Population (2026)
  - Total: 470
  - Density: 150/km^{2} (380/sq mi)
- Demonym: Tremitesi
- Time zone: UTC+1 (CET)
  - Summer (DST): UTC+2 (CEST)
- Postal code: 71051
- Dialing code: 0882
- ISTAT code: 071026
- Patron saint: Our Lady of Assumption
- Saint day: 15 August
- Website: Official website

The Tremiti Islands (Italian: Isole Tremiti, Italian pronunciation: [ˈiːzole ˈtrɛːmiti]), also literarily known as Isole Diomedee ("Diomedean Islands", from Greek Διομήδεες Diomédees), are an archipelago in the Adriatic Sea, some 10 miles (16 km) offshore to the north of the Gargano Peninsula. They constitute a comune (municipality) of Italy's Province of Foggia in the region of Apulia and form part of the Gargano national park. The archipelago is composed of 5 islands: San Domino, San Nicola, Capraia, Cretaccio, and Pianosa. They have 470 inhabitants.

The islands were used for the internment of political prisoners during Benito Mussolini's Fascist regime. It was also the prison of Julia the Younger, the granddaughter of Augustus.

The islands are now an important tourist attraction because of the clear waters surrounding them. Up to 100,000 visitors come to the islands in the summer season. Ferry services from the mainland operate from Termoli, Vieste, Rodi Garganico and Capoiale, while Alidaunia offers flights from San Domino Heliport to Foggia and Vieste.

== Etymology ==
The origin of the name of the islands is uncertain. Some of the theories include:

- it may relate to the seismic hazard of the area, which has a long history of earthquakes (from Latin tremor)
- it may date back to the times of Augustus, who exiled his granddaughter Julia the Younger to one of these islands, and then named Trimerus in Latin, maybe from Greek Τρίμερος Trímeros, meaning "three places" or "three islands").
- it may be due to the three-peak hill on the main island described by the cleric Basilio Sereno in an epigram written to Celso Bishop of Vercelli

== Islands ==
- San Domino is where most of the population resides. It is the most developed island for tourism and has the only sand beach in the archipelago.
- San Nicola is the site of a monastery where a monk named Nicolò was buried. Legend has it that every time someone tried to move his corpse off the island, a violent storm would break out, preventing navigation around the island.
- Capraia (or Capperaia) is deserted.
- Cretaccio is a large block of clay and thus uninhabited.
- Pianosa is a small, uninhabited island. Its maximum elevation is 15 metres (49 ft). Sometimes, during storms, the waves cover it.

== History ==
Inhabited since late Iron Age times (4th-3rd centuries BC), the Tremiti Islands have been a place of confinement since ancient times. Roman emperor Augustus had his granddaughter Julia the Younger transferred here, where she died after 20 years. In the Middle Ages, the archipelago was ruled by the Abbey of Santa Maria a Mare ("Holy Mary on the Sea") at San Nicola island, apparently founded here in the 9th century by Benedictine monks from Montecassino.

In the 13th century, the abbey had gained its autonomy from the father monastery, and owned lands from the Biferno to Trani on the Apulian mainland. After an alleged period of moral decadence, in 1237 the Benedictines were replaced by the Cistercian order. In 1334 the abbey was sacked by Dalmatian pirates from Omiš.

In 1412 the Lateran Canons took ownership of the islands and restored the abbey with cisterns and fortifications which withstood the assault of Ottoman ships in 1567. The abbey was suppressed in 1783 by King Ferdinand IV of Naples, who set up a penal colony.

During the Napoleonic age the islands were a stronghold of Joachim Murat's supporters, who resisted a British fleet in 1809. In 1843, to repopulate the islands, King Ferdinand II of Two Sicilies moved a number of people from Naples' slums to the islands, who mostly became fishermen.

In 1911, about 1,300 Libyans who had resisted Italian colonial rule were confined to Tremiti. After a year, around one-third of them had died, mainly from typhus.

=== 1930s ===
During the Fascist era, the archipelago continued to perform its function of confinement, detaining, among others, Amerigo Dumini, and future president of the Republic, Sandro Pertini.

Mussolini had hundreds of homosexuals deported to San Domino, in 1938. No law prohibited homosexuality at the time, and Mussolini also denied its existence, saying, "In Italy, there are only real men". However, suspected or reported homosexuals were rounded up and deported. San Domino had the distinction of being the only internment camp in which all the prisoners were gay. The conditions on the island were very difficult, and a few died.

The dormitories were spartan, with no electricity or running water. A bell would ring at 8 p.m. each day, signaling that the men were no longer allowed to be outside. For the remainder of the night, they were locked in their dorm rooms, under police supervision.

The internment camp closed in 1939, as Italy became enmeshed in the beginnings of World War II.

=== Modern era ===
In May 2012, the provincial government caused a scandal by attempting to sell off blocks of land on two of the islands for development for a reported €4m. Local environmental groups campaigned vigorously, and in the event, there were no bidders.

In August 2025, Alice Walton's $300 million yacht Kaos was seen sailing through the islands. The 360-foot Oceanco masterpiece ranks among the largest superyachts ever to visit the Tremiti Islands.

== Demographics ==
As of 2026, the population is 470, of which 57.2% are male, and 42.8% are female. Minors make up 8.7% of the population, and seniors make up 26.4%.

Historical population

| Year | Pop. | ±% |
|---|---|---|
| 1861 | 422 | — |
| 1871 | 434 | +2.8% |
| 1881 | 462 | +6.5% |
| 1901 | 817 | +76.8% |
| 1911 | 526 | −35.6% |
| 1921 | 428 | −18.6% |
| 1931 | 385 | −10.0% |
| 1936 | 407 | +5.7% |

| Year | Pop. | ±% |
|---|---|---|
| 1951 | 401 | −1.5% |
| 1961 | 349 | −13.0% |
| 1971 | 346 | −0.9% |
| 1981 | 334 | −3.5% |
| 1991 | 364 | +9.0% |
| 2001 | 367 | +0.8% |
| 2011 | 455 | +24.0% |
| 2021 | 464 | +2.0% |

Source: ISTAT

=== Immigration ===
As of 2025, immigrants make up 13.2% of the population. The 5 largest foreign countries of birth are Romania, Poland, Slovakia, Colombia, and Albania.

== See also ==
- List of islands of Italy
- Punta del Diavolo Lighthouse

== Sources ==
- Mancini, Enzo (1979). Isole Tremiti, sassi di Diomede: natura, storia, arte, turismo. Milan: Mursia.
