= Robert III of Loritello =

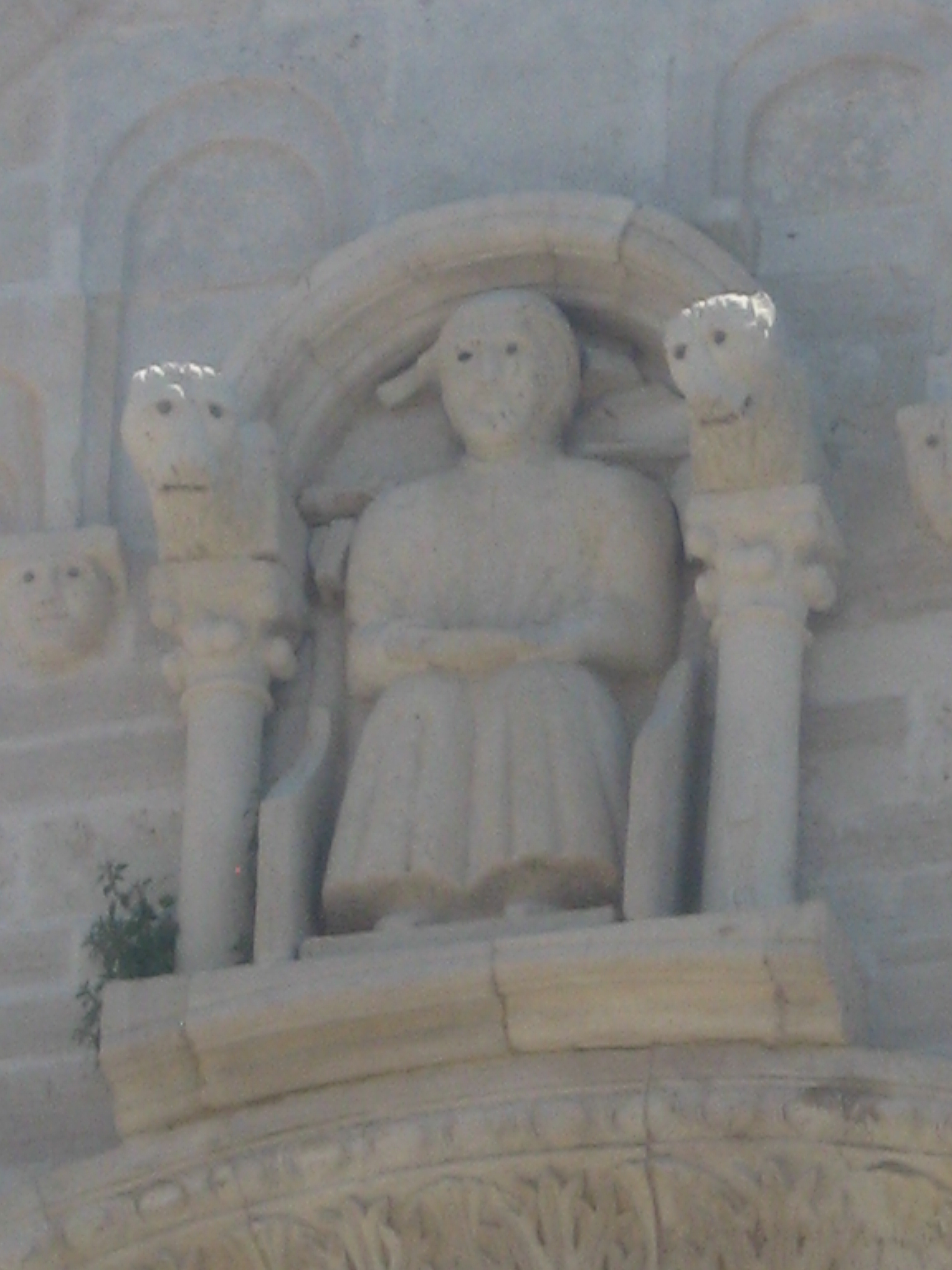
The statue of il Sedente (the sitting one) on Ruvo Cathedral may depict its founder, Robert of Loritello.

Robert of Bassunvilla (also Basunvilla and Bassonville) (c. 1125 – died 15 September 1182) was the count of Conversano (from 1138) and Loritello (from 1154, as Robert III). His family had a long history in Vassonville, near Dieppe.

Robert (II) was the son of Robert I of Bassunvilla, who had been granted Conversano by Roger II. Robert inherited this possession on his father's death. Roger II had cause later to confiscate the county of Loritello from William, his own relative. On his deathbed, he asked his son William I to appoint Robert count of Loritello, a quasi-autonomous post. Soon however, he was implicated (truly or falsely) in rebellion and fled first to the Holy Roman imperial court of Frederick Barbarossa and then the Byzantine imperial court of Manuel I Comnenus. He may have laid claim to the throne, on the basis of a forged will. He had the assistance of John Ducas when he returned to lead the revolt of 1155–1156, but the Byzantine general Michael Palaeologus died at Bari and William defeated the imperial troops.

By the Treaty of Benevento of 1156, Pope Adrian IV guaranteed Robert's right to leave the kingdom peacefully, but he renewed instead his designs on the land of the diocese of Penne. In 1157 he was encouraged in his rebellious efforts by a new emissary of Manuel I. This was Alexius Axuch, the son of Manuel's chief advisor John Axuch. Though his constable, Richard of Mandra, was captured, he evaded the royal army and continued in defiance of William I's authority. In 1161, he conquered much territory to the south. William responded by chasing him from Taranto and almost razing Salerno. In 1163, however, he was forced to flee again to Barbarossa.

In 1167, he was with the army of Rainald of Dassel at the Battle of Monte Porzio on 29 May, when a great Roman army was defeated.

In 1169, Margaret of Navarre, regent of William II and widow of William I, and her council of advisors restored Robert to all his former possessions. His widow Adelisa, daughter of Roger II, inherited Conversano.

== Sources ==
- Lexikon des Mittelalters.
- Molise in the Norman period.
- Norwich, John Julius. The Kingdom in the Sun 1130-1194. Longman: London, 1970.
- Norwich, John Julius. Byzantium: The Decline and Fall. New York: Alfred A. Knopf, 1996.
- Matthew, Donald. The Norman Kingdom of Sicily. Cambridge University Press: 1992.
- Houben, Hubert. Roger II of Sicily: A Ruler between East and West. Trans. G. A. Loud and Diane Milbourne. Cambridge University Press: 2002.

Preceded by William	Count of Loritello; 1154–1182	Succeeded by Richard de Say
Preceded by Robert I of Bassunville	Count of Conversano; 1138–1182	Succeeded by Adelisa
