= Peter II of Trani =

Peter II (French: Pierron; Italian: Pietrone; Latin: Petronius) (died 1081) was the third Italo-Norman count of Trani. He was the youngest of three sons of Peter I; his elder brothers were Amico and Geoffrey.

Peter was on good terms with his overlord Drogo, Count of Apulia, who had been his father's enemy. Peter continued his father's attempts to secure Trani, still a Byzantine possession at the time of the latter's death. Peter II also strengthened the fortifications of Bisceglie, constructing several towers. In 1073 he began the Cathedral of Bisceglie (finished 1295), which he dedicated to his namesake, Saint Peter.

In 1054 Peter finally captured Trani. He also took Canosa and "other cities" dominated by the Saracens, according to the Cronaca Cavese. In 1059 he legislated laws for his new principality. In 1057 he began receiving those Normans disaffected by the rise of Robert Guiscard after the death of Count Humphrey, whose young sons, Abelard and Herman, were pushed aside. According to William of Apulia, Peter began strengthening the walls of Trani and preparing the city to resist an attack. By 1068 Trani was in the hands of Peter's brother Geoffrey, who was loyal to Guiscard. Geoffrey died later that year and Peter returned to power, still opposed to Guiscard. Peter also acted as regent of the County of Taranto for Geoffrey's young son Richard.

Peter then sought the support of the Byzantine emperor Michael VII. He was recognised as a Greek vassal and granted the title imperialis vestis. In 1077 a local presbyter, Maraldus, donated a house to the church of San Eustachio in Corato in the presence of Erberto, Goffredo, and Guarino, who witnessed the charter as "faithful vassals" (fideles) of the imperialis vestis et comitis normannorum (imperial vestes and count of the Normans). At a congress of Norman leaders at Melfi in 1072 Peter refused to acknowledge Guiscard, then campaigning in Sicily, as Duke of Apulia. According to Amatus of Montecassino Peter then accepted the leadership of Richard I of Capua. Abelard, son of Humphrey, and Robert Arenga also joined the opposition to Guiscard, led by Richard. In the ensuing war—which Amatus places before Guiscard's return from Sicily and which William dates to after his return—Peter, with Abelard's brother Herman, took the duke's castles in Apulia and ravaged his lands, collecting a large booty. Abelard and Robert, enfeoffed in Calabria, ravaged Guiscard's lands there while Richard guarded Canne. After Guiscard returned from Sicily (according to Amatus) he immediately laid siege to Trani, which was surrendered by the citizens in less than a month, on 2 February 1073. Peter was forced into exile, first to Corato, which Guiscard besieged with ditches, siege towers, and the trebuchets and other engines used at Trani. When Peter and Herman tried to intercept the engines coming up from Trani they were met by Guiscard's brother-in-law, Guy, Duke of Sorrento, who imprisoned them, Herman in Rapolla, Peter in Trani. When Richard left Canne for Capua, Guiscard marched on his cities, taking Andria after a brief siege and forcing the surrender of Cisterna, where he had Peter tied to a timber screen and exposed so that the defenders, who were his vassals, could not counterattack without injuring or killing him. At Peter's insistence they surrendered.

Peter was later freed and forced to swear an oath of fealty to Guiscard and promise to fight in his service. His county, save Trani itself, was restored to him on the condition that he lead an expedition into the Balkans (1073). Unlike Peter's brother Geoffrey's attempted expedition against Byzantine lands in the Balkans, this campaign was directed against the Dalmatian lands of the Kingdom of Croatia. Peter's cousin, Amico, son of Walter of Giovinazzo, attacked Rab on 14 April and took Cres on 9 May, taking the Croatian king, Peter Kresimir IV, captive. The king was ransomed for a large sum by the Bishop of Cres and died shortly thereafter, being buried in the church of Saint Stephen in the fortress of Klis.

In 1080 Peter was again in control of Trani and in rebellion. Guiscard left the siege of the place under the watch of his wife, Sichelgaita, with some Bariot reinforcements, and himself besieged Taranto, which Peter had been ruling for his nephew, by land and sea. Peter was forced to surrender and seek forgiveness. He died in 1081 in Epirus in battle against the Byzantines while taking part in Guiscard's expedition against Durazzo.
