= Leo Perenos =

11th-century Byzantine governor

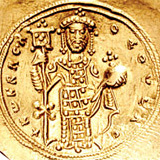

Leo Perenos (Greek: Λέων Περενός) was a Byzantine governor (doux) of Dyrrhachium, and the penultimate Catepan of Italy.

In April 1064, as the doux of Dyrrhachium, Perenos provided military and financial aid to Robert, the Norman Count of Mentescaglioso, who was revolting against his uncle, Duke Robert Guiscard of the Apulia and Calabria.

In 1068, the incumbent Catepan of Italy, Abulchares, died. Perenos was appointed as his replacement. The capital of the Catepanate, Bari, had been besieged by the Normans. However, Perenos could not provide a relief mission, as he was unable to cross the sea.

== Sources ==
- Leon (20276) Perenos, doux of Italy. Prosopography of the Byzantine World.
- Dickert, Christopher Henry (2014). Byzantium, Political Agency, and the City: A Case Study in Urban Autonomy During the Norman Conquest of Southern Italy (PDF) (MA thesis). Simon Fraser University.

| Preceded by Abulchares | Catepan of Italy; 1068–1071 | Succeeded by Stephen Pateranos |
