= Abelard of Hauteville =

Member of the Hauteville family

Abelard of Hauteville (c. 1044 – 1081) was the eldest son of Humphrey, count of Apulia and Calabria (1051–1057), and his Lombard wife, Gaitelgrima of Salerno, also known as Altrude. He was supposed to inherit his father's lands, but Robert Guiscard, his uncle and guardian, who was elected count on Humphrey's death, confiscated them.

In April 1064, Abelard joined three discontented barons (Geoffrey I of Conversano; Joscelin, Lord of Molfetta; and Robert, Count of Montescaglioso) in rebellion against Robert, who had just left for Sicily. They received the aid, financial and military, of Perenos, the Byzantine duke of Durazzo, and held out for several years, neither making headway against Robert nor he against them. On 1 January 1068, Romanus Diogenes was acclaimed emperor in Constantinople and the Greeks transferred their military attention to the Seljuk threat to their east. The rebellion fell apart and by February only Geoffrey remained. Abelard was exiled, but Robert forgave him and gave him cities.

Abelard was again at the head of a revolt later in December 1071. Then, he recruited not only the Byzantines, but his brother Herman, whose inheritance had also been confiscated by his guardian Guiscard at the same time, and the lords of Giovinazzo and Trani. To their aid came the prince of Capua, Richard Drengot, and the prince of Salerno, Gisulf II, both of whom feared the ascendancy of Robert Guiscard. Robert, however, did not leave the siege of Palermo. He preferred to ignore the insurrection, then spreading to Calabria, in favour of speeding up events in Sicily.

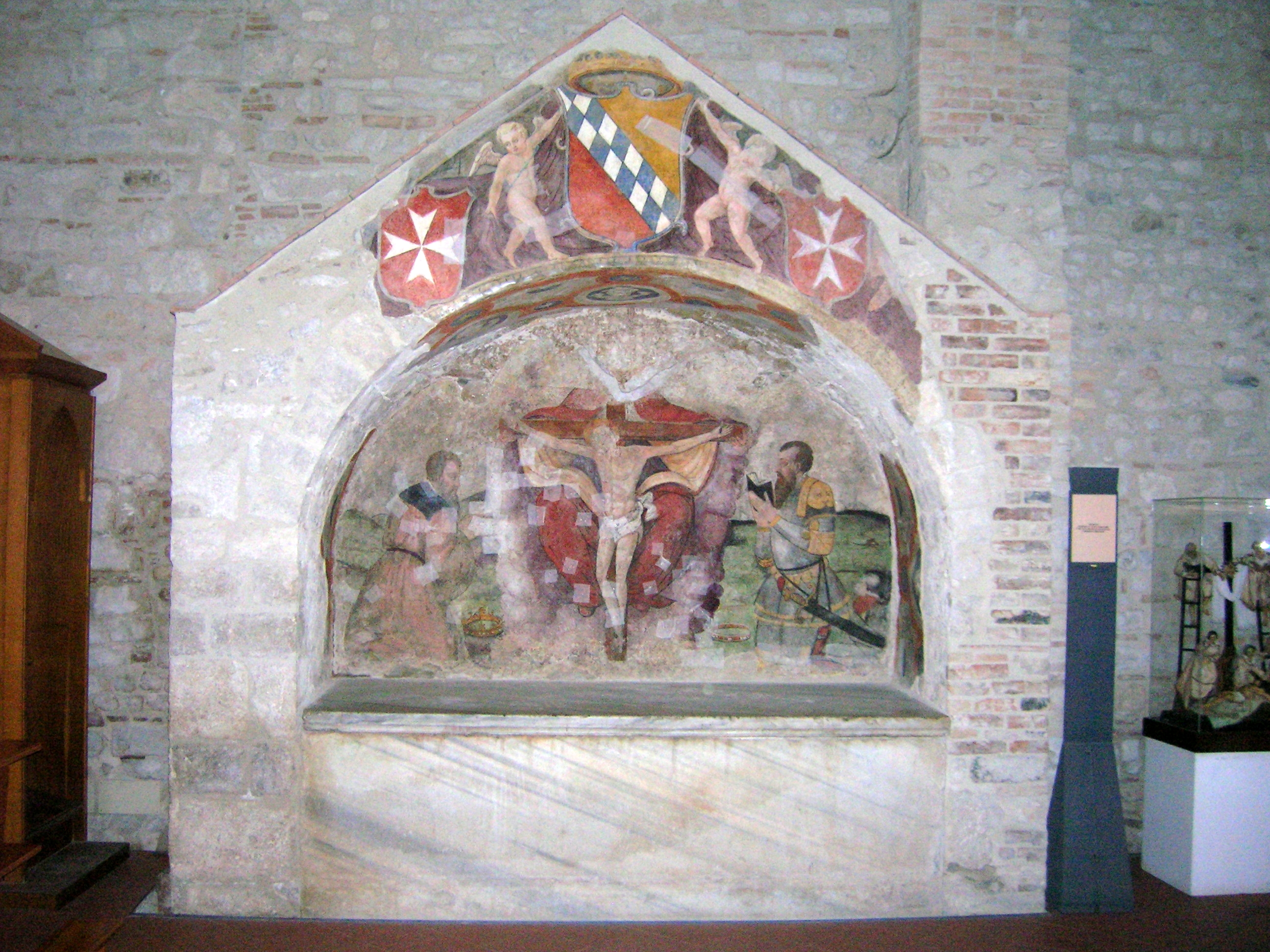
Family grave of the Hauteville, Abbey of the Santissima Trinità, Venosa

Palermo fell in 1072 and Robert returned to the peninsula the next year, easily putting down most of the rebels. However, he fell ill at Trani and was taken to Bari, where Sichelgaita, his wife, had the barons proclaim her son Roger Borsa his heir. Abelard was the only baron to dissent from the election of Roger, claiming that he was the rightful heir to the duchy. He rebelled yet again in 1078, with Geoffrey and Peter II of Trani again, and with the support of Jordan, Prince of Capua, Richard's son. He also married a daughter of the Bariot leader Argyritzos. A separate peace was made with Jordan and the rebellion, which was originally very well-organised, fell apart in 1079. Abelard was exiled in 1080. He travelled to Constantinople with his brother, where he was welcomed cordially by the Emperor Alexius I Comnenus. He died, perhaps assassinated, probably in Illyria, in 1081, around April. He was buried in Greece and never brought back to Venosa, where most of his family lies to this day.
