= Robert I of Loritello =

Italo-Norman nobleman

Robert I (died 1107) was an Italo-Norman nobleman, the eldest son of Geoffrey of Hauteville, one of the elder sons of Tancred of Hauteville. He was the first count of Loritello in 1061.

Like his father, he began his military conquests in the Abruzzi, encroaching on lands held by the Roman pontiff. He advanced as far as Ortona in 1070, a year before his father's death. Unsurprisingly, he was excommunicated (February 1075). Pope Gregory VII speaks of his "Godless insolence." Where Duke Robert Guiscard and Prince Richard of Capua had failed to expand northwards, Robert of Loritello and Richard's son Jordan had success. By 1075, Robert was making his seat at Chieti. While Jordan advanced in the district around Lake Fucino, Robert advanced up the Adriatic coast. He made his brother Drogo count of Chieti (or Teate). In 1076, Ortona finally fell with the assistance of troops from Robert Guiscard. The local Lombard nobility, as far as the Pescara, did homage to him. He had five hundred knights under his command. In return for his uncle's help, he sent a contingent of his own men to assist in the defeat of his cousin Abelard in Sant'Agata di Puglia.

In June 1080, pope Gregory VII recognised the Norman conquests of Robert and Jordan up to Fermo. In June 1083, besieged in the Castel Sant'Angelo by the Emperor Henry IV, the pope begged the assistance of the duke. The two Roberts, uncle and nephew, came to his rescue. Robert took part in the second Byzantine expedition of his uncle's in 1084–1085. He was at the Guiscard's deathbed and remained loyal to his uncle's chosen heir, Roger Borsa, whose guardian he had been.

He continued his conquests and before his death had made it beyond the Fortore and as far as the Tronto. He ruled from Bovino (conquered 1100) to Ascoli Piceno. He may have even ruled Dragonara. By the end of his life, he had taken the titles comes Dei gratia (count by the grace of God) and comes comitorum (count of counts). He was succeeded by his son, Robert II of Loritello.

== Sources ==
- Chalandon, Ferdinand (1907). Histoire de la domination normande en Italie et en Sicile. Paris.
- Norwich, John Julius (1967). The Normans in the South 1016-1130. London: Longmans.

Preceded by New creation	Count of Loritello; 1061–1107	Succeeded by Robert II
