= John Doukas (megas hetaireiarches) =

John Doukas (Greek: Ἰωάννης Δούκας, romanized: Iōannēs Doúkas; fl. 1155/6–1181) was a senior Byzantine military commander and diplomat under Manuel I Komnenos, serving in southern Italy, Hungary, Asia Minor, and the Holy Land. He rose to the rank of sebastos and the office of megas hetaireiarches. Several of his seals bearing these titles are extant.

Demetrios Polemis erroneously identified him with his contemporary, the Eparch of the City John Kamateros, as "John Doukas Kamateros". This has been corrected by other scholars since. Patricia Karlin-Hayter notably decomposed Polemis' composite figure into six or seven different people, of which John Doukas was assigned the bulk of the military and diplomatic career of Polemis' figure.

The first activity which can be more or less securely attributed to John Doukas is an embassy to the Holy Roman Emperor Frederick I Barbarossa in 1155, followed by the ultimately failed attempt to recover Apulia against the Italo-Normans of the Kingdom of Sicily. Based at Ancona, Doukas and Michael Palaiologos initially scored some successes, including the capture of the old capital of Byzantine southern Italy, Bari. After Palaiologos died in spring 1156, Doukas assumed sole command of the campaign and captured Brindisi. Although Manuel I sent his cousin Alexios Komnenos with ships to Bari, no land troops arrived, so that the Byzantine commanders were defeated and captured by King William I of Sicily in May 1156. The near contemporary historian John Kinnamos aquarely blames both Alexios and Doukas for not being prudent enough to avoid a direct confrontation, and further for spoiling the subsequent expedition by Alexios Axouch by making, while in captivity, promises to King William, but the historian's views may be tainted by later events.

Doukas then commanded an expedition in Dalmatia in 1164, and against the Hungarians in 1166. He is first attested as megas hetaireiarches in 1170, when he attended the synod at Constantinople that condemned John Eirenikos. In 1177, he led an embassy to Baldwin IV of Jerusalem. In 1179, he paid a visit to Thessalonica and was the object of an oration by the scholar and archbishop Eustathius of Thessalonica, who praises his interest in theology. He is known to have corresponded with Michael Glykas concerning theological matters. Eustathius further mentions that he fought unspecified campaigns in Asia Minor. Another scholar, the philosopher Constantine of Nicaea, wrote a consolatio on the death of John's wife, praising her interest in "real philosophy" (ascetic virtue).

John supported the accession of Alexios II Komnenos in 1180. He may be the John Doukas that Niketas Choniates has him defending Nicaea unsuccessfully against Andronikos Komnenos in 1182. This identification is uncertain, since Choniates does not give him a title. If he still was megas hetaireiarches, he was replaced by Andronikos.

== Sources ==
- Birkenmeier, John W. (2002). The Development of the Komnenian Army: 1081–1180. Leiden: Brill. ISBN 90-04-11710-5.
- Eisenberg, Merle; Jenkins, David (2021). "The Philosophy of Constantine the Philosopher of Nicaea". Byzantinische Zeitschrift. 114 (1): 139–162. doi:10.1515/bz-2021-9006. S2CID 233328315.
- Karlin-Hayter, Patricia (1972). "99. Jean Doukas". Byzantion (in French). 42 (1): 259–266. JSTOR 44170347.
- Kazhdan, A. P. (1969). "John Doukas – an attempt at de-identification". Le Parole e le Idee. 11: 242–247.
- Polemis, Demetrios I. (1968). The Doukai: A Contribution to Byzantine Prosopography. London: The Athlone Press. OCLC 299868377.
- Magdalino, Paul (2002) [1993]. The Empire of Manuel I Komnenos, 1143–1180. Cambridge: Cambridge University Press. ISBN 0-521-52653-1.
- Stone, Andrew F. (1999). "The 'Grand Hetaireiarch' John Doukas: The Career of a Twelfth-Century Soldier and Diplomat". Byzantion. 69 (1): 145–164. JSTOR 44172159.
