= Abbey of Santa Maria a Mare =

Former monastery in Isole Tremiti, Italy

Coordinates: 42.1215°N 15.5049°E

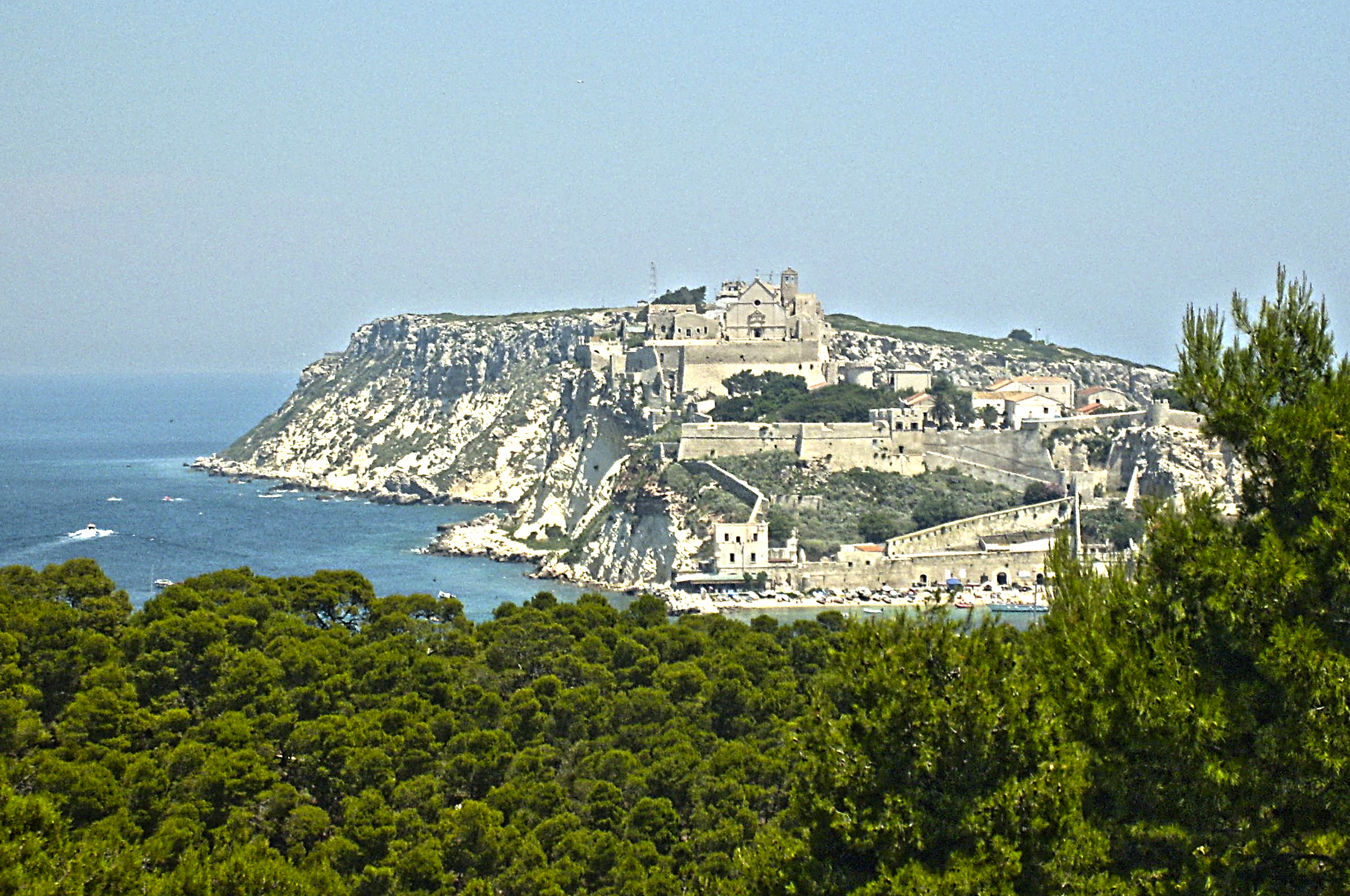
The ruins of the monastery dominate the island of San Nicola. They form a monument to the Adriatic Early Romanesque style, which integrated the Western European tradition with those of Byzantium and the Mediterranean.

The Abbey of Santa Maria a Mare was a monastery on the island of San Nicola in the Tremiti Islands off the northern coast of the Gargano Peninsula in Italy from the 9th century until 1782.

== Founding and early history ==
According to Cardinal Leo Marsicanus, the 11th-century historian of the Abbey of Monte Cassino, a monk of Monte Cassino named Monecaus served as provost in a "cell" (cella) dedicated to Saint James in the Tremiti Islands during the abbacy of Bertharius (856–83). Leo reports that in his day many charters from the time of Monecaus were still in the archives of Monte Cassino. For some reason, Leo later erased this information from his chronicle. None of the charters he mentions survive. In 883, a band of Saracens sacked Monte Cassino and the monks went into exile for over half a century. This period must have severed relations between it and its provostries, including Tremiti.

Originally the abbey was dedicated to James the Greater and its associated with the Virgin Mary developed gradually in the early 11th century. The earliest document referring to the abbey on San Nicola is a record of a land-grant of Bishop Landenulf of Lucera dated to November 1005. In it the abbey is called the "monastery of the Blessed James the Apostle which is in Tremiti island". (Note: monasterium Beati Iacobi apostoli qui est in Tremiti insula) Mary was associated with the abbey for the first time in a document of 1014, where it is called the "church of Saint Mary and Saint James the Apostle which are [sic] constructed in the place that is called Tremiti". (Note: ecclesia S. Mariae et S. Iacobi apostoli que constructe sunt in loco qui Tremiti vocatur) This dual association with James and Mary is a constant in the documentation from 1026 (Note: monasterium Beate Dei genitricis et virginis Mariae et S. Iacobi apostoli quod situm est in insula que dicitur Tremiti: "monastery of the Blessed Mother of God and Virgin Mary and Saint James the Apostle that is situated in the island that is called Tremiti") until 1059, although reference to James was dropped in a charter dated to 1023. (Note: cenobium Beate Marie in insula quae Tremiti dicitur: "monastery of the Blessed Mary in the island that is called Tremiti") After 1059 there is no further reference to Saint James.

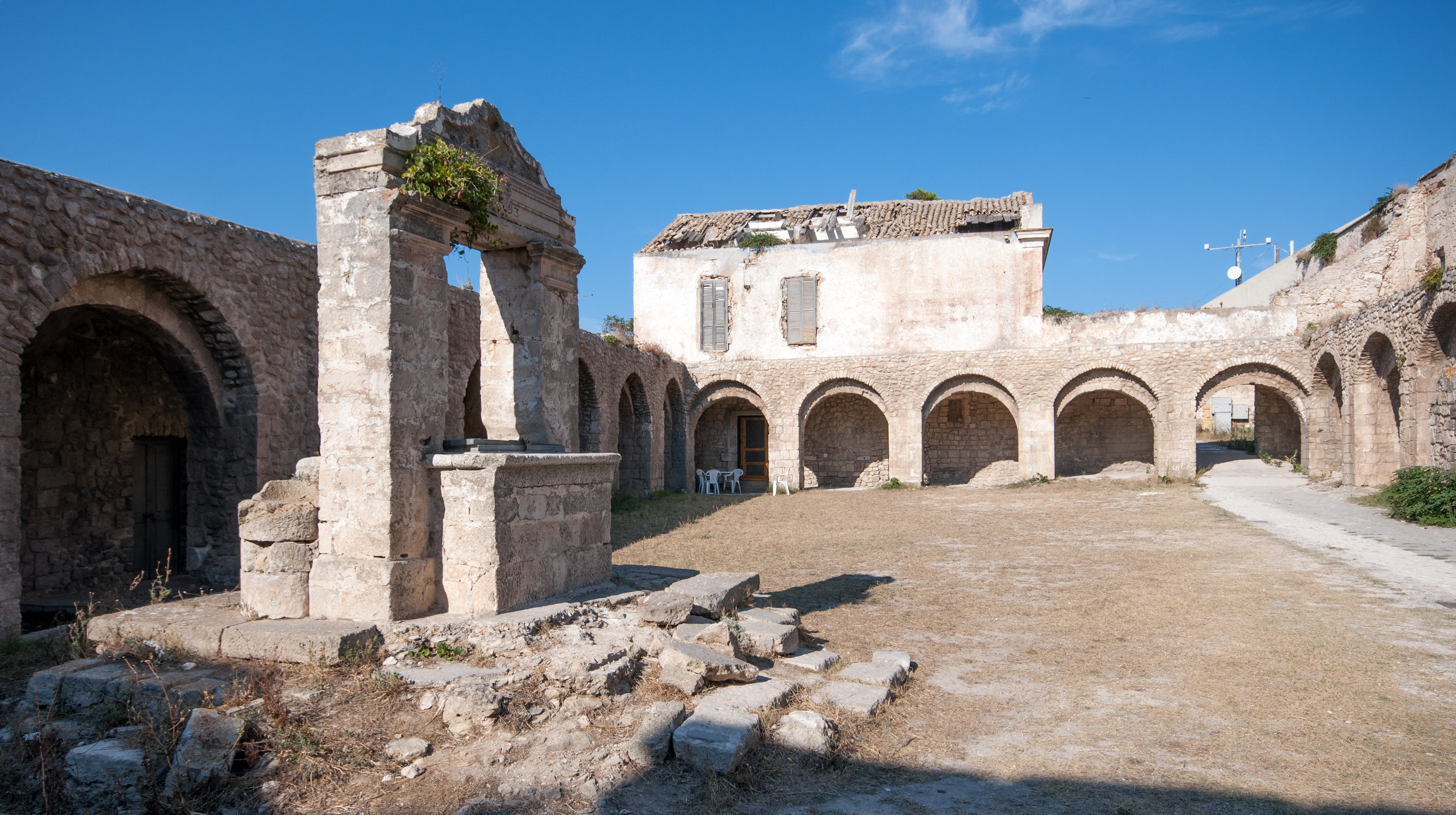
Courtyard of the ruined monastery

== Threats to independence ==
Abbot Desiderius of Monte Cassino, supported by Duke Robert Guiscard of Apulia, tried to enforce his abbey's old rights over Santa Maria, but in a dramatic series of events in 1071–73 was forced to back down. In 1081 he formally admitted his sin and acknowledged Santa Maria's independence. The abbot he tried to remove, Ferrus, outlived him and the abbot whose election he engineered, Ungrellus, is never heard of again. Nevertheless, papal privileges continued to list the monastery of Tremiti as a Cassinese possession down to the time of Anastasius IV (1153/4), and an imperial privilege of Lothair II in 1137 did likewise.

== Decline ==
By the thirteenth century, the abbey of Santa Maria a Mare was in decline. In 1237 it was granted to the Cistercian Order. Sometime between 1334 and 1343 it was reduced to commendatory status. The Canons Regular of the Lateran took over in 1412 and put it under a prior, who was raised to an abbot again in 1482. In the sixteenth century the monastery was renovated, but in the following century it again went into decline. In 1674 the Tremiti Islands were occupied by the Kingdom of Naples.

== Suppression ==
The islands became part of the royal domain in 1737 and the monastery was suppressed by royal decree in 1782. The monastic archives were transferred to the Archivio Grande in Naples. They were lost to fire in 1943 during World War II. The medieval cartulary, however, survives and was published in 1960.
