= Geoffrey, Count of Ragusa =

Siculo-Norman count

Geoffrey of Ragusa was a son of Roger I, Count of Sicily. He was likely illegitimate. It is not possible for this Geoffrey to be the same as his brother, also named Geoffrey, as this other Geoffrey was born by Roger I's first or second marriage and is recorded as being a leper by Goffredo Malaterra. In 1091, Geoffrey was granted the County of Ragusa by his father.

== Children ==
Geoffrey married a woman named Rogalia, and had five children with her:

- Bartholomew
- Silvester I, Count of Marsico
- Geoffrey
- Roger
- Airolda (mistress of King Roger II, her uncle)

Different sources also claim that from “Geoffrey, one of Tancred’s sons” descends the Guarna / Avarna family. These sources also describe said Geoffrey's sons as Counts of Marsico. It is thus probable that the sources are mistaken when they talk about a son of Tancred, and that they're actually referring to this Geoffrey, the Count of Ragusa, as the ancestor of the Avarna family.

== Sources ==
- Hayes, Dawn Marie "The Case of Geoffrey of Hauteville, Count of Ragusa: A Story of Leprosy and Legitimacy from Norman Sicily". Speculum 98 (2023): 86–121.
- Houben, Hubert (translated by Graham A. Loud and Diane Milburn). Roger II of Sicily: Ruler between East and West. Cambridge University Press, 2002.
- Curtis, Edmund. Roger of Sicily and the Normans in Lower Italy 1016-1154. G.P. Putnam's Sons: London, 1912.
