= Breve chronicon Northmannicum =

Chronicle of the Norman invasion of Italy

The Breve chronicon Northmannicum or Little Norman Chronicle is a short, anonymous Latin chronicle of the Norman conquest of southern Italy, probably written in Apulia in the early twelfth-century. It covers the years from the first Norman "invasion" of Apulia in 1041 to the death of Robert Guiscard in 1085. Though once treated as an important source, its reliability and authenticity have been called into question by André Jacob, who showed that it is probably an eighteenth-century forgery by Pietro Polidori. According to John France, who seems unaware of Jacob's argument, it was based mainly on an oral tradition and was subsequently used as a source for both the Chronicon Amalfitanum and Romuald Guarna.

The first edition of the Chronicon was published by Ludovico Antonio Muratori in the fifth volume of his Rerum italicarum scriptores (1724) under the long title Breve chronicon Northmannicum de rebus in Iapygia et Apulia gestis contra Graecos. The text he used was preserved in a twelfth- or thirteenth-century codex borrowed from Pietro Polidori, as well as a copy of c.1530, both now lost. Only one authentic copy remains, though a forgery of G. Guerrieri also exists. In 1971 a new edition was published by Errico Cuozzo in the Bollettino dell'Istituto storico italiano per il Medioevo.
