= Peter I of Trani =

Peter I (died c. 1060), also known as Petronius (French: Pierron and Italian: Petrone or Pietrone), was the first Norman count of Trani. He was one of the most prominent of the twelve leaders of the Norman mercenaries serving Guaimar IV of Salerno. Though it had not yet been conquered from the Byzantine Empire, Peter received Trani in the Normans' division of Apulia made at Melfi in 1042. In that same division his brother Walter received Civitate.

Peter probably arrived in southern Italy around 1035. It is unknown if Peter was in fact from Normandy; he may have been a Breton or a Frenchman. His father, Amicus (Amico), may have been a relative of the Hautevilles or married to one. In 1038 Peter participated in the Byzantine campaign led by George Maniakes against the Emirate of Sicily. In battle he was usually found beside William Iron Arm, the leader and first count of the Normans of Melfi. After the division of 1042 Peter fortified the region around Trani, building new cities at Andria and Corato and re-fortifying Bisceglie and Barletta, as recorded by the chronicler William of Apulia (book II, lines 30–32):

Ditior his Petrus consanguinitate propinquus
Edidit hic Andrum fabricavit et inde Coretum
Buxilias, Barolum maris aedificavit in oris.

In 1046 he made his first assault on Trani, succeeding in capturing the suburbs and environs but not the city itself, which was defended by Argyrus, a former Norman ally. The Tranesi themselves were Byzantine partisans, with no sympathy for the Normans.

In 1046 Peter was also a candidate to succeed William. According to William of Apulia, though he was the wealthier candidate he was confronted at Melfi by William's brothers Humphrey and Drogo, who supposedly mortally wounded him in a duel. More likely he was just taken captive, since he and Humphrey jointly led a Norman army against Argyrus in 1053. Argyrus had travelled with his troops by ship to Siponto. There he was defeated, suffering heavy losses and, being severely wounded himself, barely escaped to Vieste, according to the Anonymus Barensis (§152).

Peter is recorded by Amatus of Montecassino as entering Melfi again in 1057 to dispute the succession with Drogo's younger brother Robert Guiscard. According to the same source the Melfitans rebelled against him and he fled to Cisterna. Peter and Guiscard must have made peace, however, as Amatus records that the former's two daughters were found wealthy husbands by the latter.

In 1064, Peter's second son Geoffrey refers to his father as magni comitis Petroni in an act donating one ship to the monastery of the Santissima Trinità in Venosa for fishing on the Mar Piccolo, the bay of Taranto. Peter's youngest son, Peter II, likewise confirmed this donation pro remedio anime (ejus) ("for the health of [their father's] soul"). Peter I had not taken Trani by the time of his death. He is sometimes confused with his son Peter. The "count Petrone" who defeated Argyrus in 1053 has an entry in the Prosopography of the Byzantine World and is identified there with the son of Amicus, that is, Peter I, though other source believe the Petronius of 1053 was Peter II. "Petronius" is an augmentative of Peter, and indicates greatness (probably of stature). Peter I's relationship to his son Geoffrey is mentioned in Lupus Protospatharius. Peter's eldest son, Amicus, is barely known.
