= Robert II of Loritello =

Robert II (died 1134 or 1137) was the son and successor of Count Robert I of Loritello. His father died in 1107. He married his second cousin Adelaide, a daughter of Roger II of Sicily and Elvira of Castile. They had a son, named William, who succeeded him.

Robert was a friend of the Church. He took part in the council of Troia (1115) of Pope Paschal II and that of 1120 of Callixtus II.

== Sources ==
- Lexikon des Mittelalters.
- Molise in the Norman period.

Preceded by Robert I	Count of Loritello; 1107-1137	Succeeded by William
