= Opprandino Arrivabene =

Italian noble and journalist (1807–1887)

- Opprandino Arrivabene c. 1870
- Born: 11 September 1807; Mantua, Italy
- Died: 2 January 1887 (aged 79); Rome, Italy
- Occupation: Journalist

Opprandino Arrivabene (11 September 1807 – 2 January 1887) was an Italian journalist and patriot. A native of Mantua, he led a peripatetic life, living in Milan, Naples, Genoa, Turin, Florence and finally Rome where he died at the age of 79. He was a lifelong friend of the composer Giuseppe Verdi with whom he had a correspondence of over 200 letters spanning 50 years.

== Life and career ==
Arrivabene was born in Mantua to the junior branch of a noble family descended from the Byzantine Komnenos dynasty with later ties to the House of Gonzaga. His father was Count Ferdinando Arrivabene (1770–1834), a lawyer and Dante scholar. His mother was Carolina Lamberti, a Florentine noblewoman. Arrivabene was educated at the Benedictine college in Parma and then returned to Mantua where, like his uncles and father, he was active in the liberal movement and the early struggle for Italian independence. In 1830, when the Austrian authorities became suspicious of his political activities in Mantua, he left for Milan. There he pursued an intense career as a journalist over the next decade, writing for L'Indicatore Lombardo, Corriere delle dame, Il Foletto, L'Antologia, Il Giovedì, and Figaro and serving as editor-in-chief of La Strenna Italiana. He was also a prominent member of Clara Maffei's salon where his friendship with Verdi began.

In 1839 he went to Naples as the private secretary to the marchese Filippo Ala Ponzone, who like Arrivabene was a fervent supporter of the Risorgimento, and continued working as a journalist there. He later moved to Genoa in the company of Ala Ponzone and then to Turin in 1855 where he was one of the editors of l'Opinione and founded La Staffetta which later became La Gazzetta di Torino. Arrivabene left Turin for Florence in 1865 when the capital of the Kingdom of Italy shifted from Turin to Florence. He finally settled in Rome in 1871 when the capital shifted to that city. He lived there for the rest of his life and continued to write for L'Opinione.

According to his obituary in the Gazzetta Piemontese, Arrivabene lived in Rome's Piazza Lucina and was a well-known figure in the cafes of the Via del Corso, always dressed in black with a broad-brimmed shepherd's hat and a long white beard. He never married. When his health began to fail in 1885 he was looked after by his cousin Giovanni Arrivabene and his nephew Silvio who were with him when he died of heart failure in 1887 at the age of 79.

== Friendship with Verdi ==
A close friend and confidante of Giuseppe Verdi, Arrivabene exchanged over 200 letters with the composer in the course of their life-time. The earliest surviving letter dates from 1846 but indicated an already well-established friendship. Shortly before his death in 1887, Arrivabene asked his nephew Silvio to send his gold watch to Verdi accompanied by a poem:

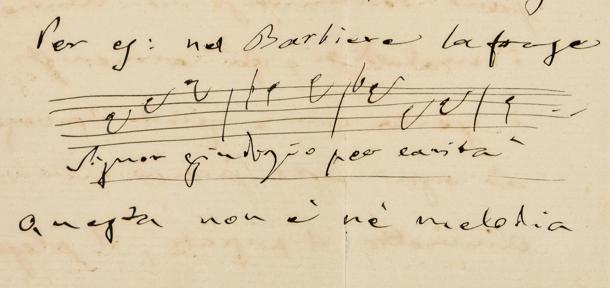
Part of a letter from Verdi to Arrivabene dated 17 March 1882 in which he comments on Figaro's phrase "Signor giudizio, per carità" from The Barber of Seville: "This is neither melody nor harmony; it is the word, declaimed, exact and true; and it is music."

Oh, the dearest of my dearest friends,
I give you this indicator of hours
To mark a century of happy hours. (Note: Original Italian: "Oh il più caro tra i miei più cari amici, Ti possa questo indicator dell' ore, Un secolo segnar d'ore felici.")

Verdi wrote back to Silvio:

I am deeply moved to receive this memento from my poor Opprandino, made even more precious by the poem and words that accompanied it. The sincere, loyal friendship of almost half a century and the many vicissitudes and memories that we shared make this loss deeply painful, irreparable. (Note: Original Italian: "Profondamente commosso, ricevo il ricordo legatomi dal mio povero Opprandino. Questo ricordo mi è ancora più prezioso pe' versi e le parole che lo accompagnano. L'amicizia di quasi mezzo secolo, sincera, leale, le molte vicende ed infinite ricordanze comuni ad ambedue mi rendono questa perdita dolorosissima, irreparabile.")

Arrivabene's friendships with the literary and musical figures of the day and his work as a critic for the prominent theatrical journal Figaro had been a great help to Verdi at the beginning of his career, and he later advised the composer on plays that might be suitable for his operas. However, their correspondence ranged far wider than artistic subjects. They wrote to each other on everything from gastronomy to politics (where both adhered to the liberalism of Cavour). Some of their letters were written in the names of their dogs, Verdi's Blach and Arrivabene's Ron-Ron, who gossiped to each other about their respective owners.

Although many of the letters have been lost, some of them are held in Yale University's Beinecke Library and a further 82 are held in the Casa di Riposo per Musicisti which Verdi founded in 1896. Alessandro Luzio published a selection of Verdi's letters held by the Arrivabene family in the Corriere della Sera's literary magazine, La Lettura in 1904. A more extensive collection of the Arrivabene–Verdi correspondence, edited and annotated by Annibale Alberti with a preface by Luzio, was published in 1931 under the title Verdi intimo: Carteggio di Giuseppe Verdi con il conte Opprandino Arrivabene.
