= Arienti =

Arienti is an Italian surname. Notable people with the surname include:

- Luigi Arienti, (1937-), Italian race cyclist.
- Stefano Arienti, (1961-), Italian artist.
- Héctor Arienti, (1957- ) Argentine Scientific
- Carlo Arienti (1800–1873), Italian painter.
- Zenón Arienti, (1879–1949), Swiss. Builder, entrepreneur in Argentina
- Luis Alberto Arienti, Argentine medical doctor
- Carolina Arienti Lattanzi, (1771–1818), Italian writer, journalist, poet, and early figure in the Italian feminist movement.
- Guido Novak von Arienti (1859–1928), Austro-Hungarian lieutenant field marshal.
- Sabadino degli Arienti, (1445–1510), Italian humanist, author, poet and prose writer.
