= Byzantine Empire under the Doukas dynasty =

Period of Byzantine history from 1059 to 1081

Byzantine Empire: Βασιλεία Ῥωμαίων (Ancient Greek); Imperium Romanum (Latin)
- 1059–1081
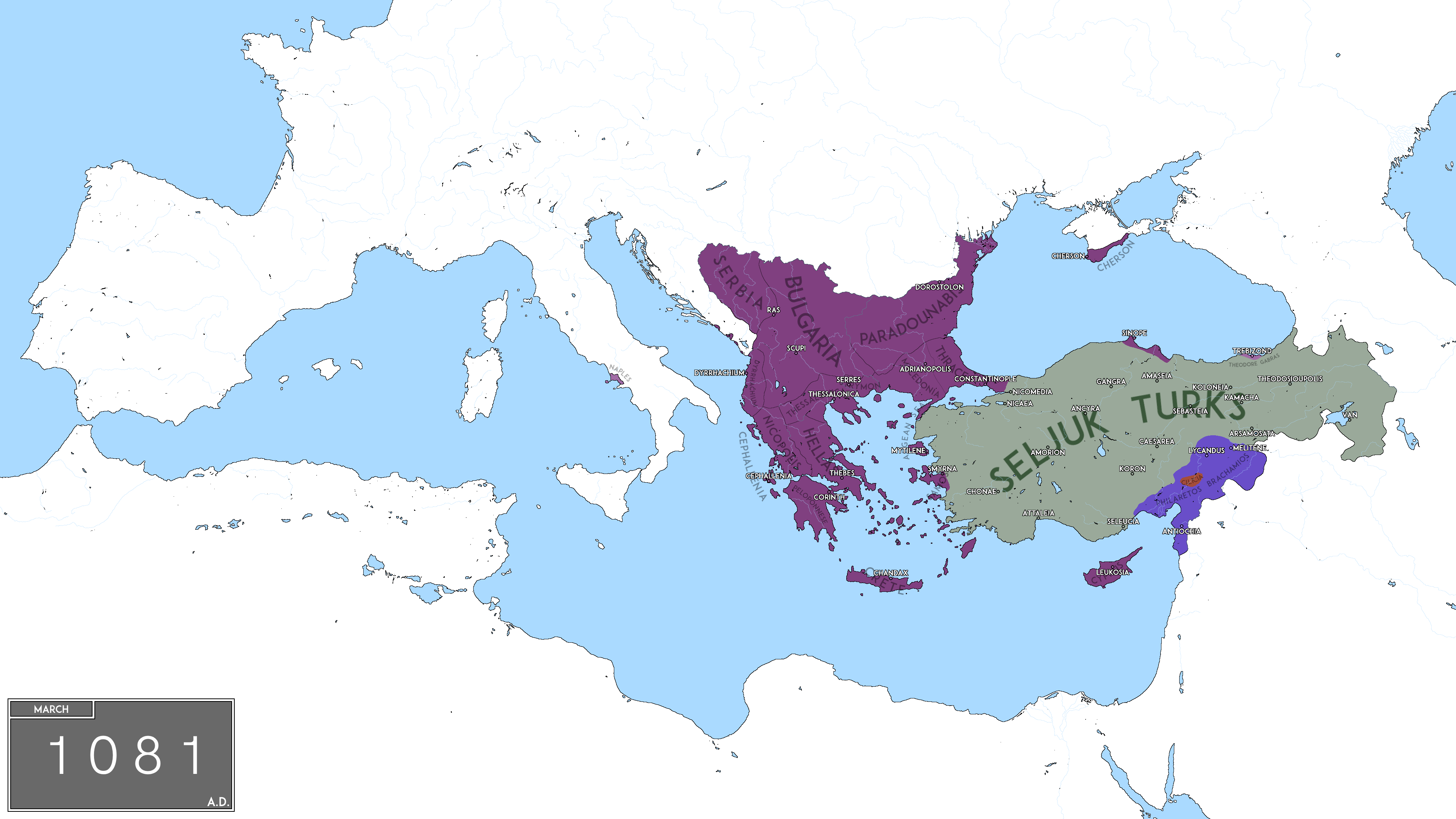
- The Byzantine Empire in 1081 before the coronation of Alexios I
- Capital: Constantinople
- Common languages: Greek, Armenian, Aromanian, Old Bulgarian, South Slavic languages
- Religion: Greek Orthodox Church
- Government: Bureaucratic semi-elective monarchy
- Emperor
  - 1059–1067: Constantine X Doukas
  - 1071–1078: Michael VII Doukas
- History
  - Abdication of Isaac I Komnenos: 1059
  - Coronation of Alexios I: 1081
Preceded by
Byzantine Empire under the Macedonian dynasty
Succeeded by
Byzantine Empire under the Komnenos dynasty
Sultanate of Rum
Danishmendids
Armenian Kingdom of Cilicia
Grand Principality of Serbia

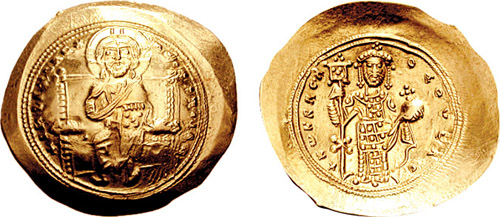
Gold histamenon of Emperor Constantine X Doukas (r. 1059–1067).

The Byzantine Empire was ruled by emperors of the Doukas dynasty between 1059 and 1081. There are six emperors and co-emperors of this period: the dynasty's founder, Emperor Constantine X Doukas (r. 1059–1067), his brother John Doukas, katepano and later Caesar, Romanos IV Diogenes (r. 1068–1071), Constantine's son Michael VII Doukas (r. 1071–1078), Michael's son and co-emperor Constantine Doukas, and finally Nikephoros III Botaneiates (r. 7 January 1078 – 1 April 1081), who claimed descent from the Phokas family.

Under the rule of the Doukids, Byzantium was fighting a losing battle against the Seljuk Turks, losing most of its remaining possessions in Asia Minor following the catastrophic defeat at the Battle of Manzikert in 1071 and the following civil war after the death of Romanos IV Diogenes. Byzantium also incurred substantial loss of territory in the Balkans, to the Serbs, as well as losing its final foothold in Italy, to the Normans.

Although the Komnenai temporarily restored the Empire during the 12th century with help from the Crusades, the empire crumbled again under the succeeding Angeloi, leading to the sacking of Constantinople during the Fourth Crusade. The empire never recovered fully from this blow and the fragmentation it brought, and entered a terminal decline under the Palaiologoi, marked by civil war and constant warfare with neighbouring states. The remnants were then gradually conquered by the Ottomans in the late medieval period, ending with the capture of Constantinople in 1453.

In 1077, Alexios Komnenos, then a general, married Irene Doukaina, the great-niece of Constantine X. His marriage to a Doukaina made him senior to his elder brother Isaac, and it was Doukai financial and political support that largely facilitated the successful coup that brought him to the throne.

== Constantine X ==
The Doukai of the 11th century provided several generals, governors. They seem to have come from Paphlagonia, and were exceedingly wealthy, possessing extensive estates in Anatolia. The relationship of this group with the Doukai of the 9th and 10th centuries is unclear; the contemporary writers Michael Psellos and Nicholas Kallikles affirm such a relationship, but Zonaras openly questioned it. Before becoming emperor, Constantine X had married into the powerful Dalassenoi family, and took as a second wife Eudokia Makrembolitissa, niece of the Patriarch Michael Keroularios. Further dynastic matches were made with the clans of the Anatolian military aristocracy, including the Palaiologoi and the Pegonitai.

Constantine Doukas gained influence after he married, as his second wife, Eudokia Makrembolitissa, a niece of Patriarch Michael Keroularios. In 1057, Constantine supported the usurpation of Isaac I Komnenos, gradually siding with the court bureaucracy against the new emperor's reforms. In spite of this tacit opposition, Constantine was chosen as successor by the ailing Isaac in November 1059, under the influence of Michael Psellos. Isaac abdicated, and on November 24, 1059, Constantine X Doukas was crowned emperor.

The new emperor quickly associated two of his young sons in power, Michael VII Doukas and Konstantios Doukas, appointed his brother John Doukas as kaisar (Caesar), and embarked on a policy favorable to the interests of the court bureaucracy and the church. Severely undercutting the training and financial support for the armed forces, Constantine X fatally weakened Byzantine defences by disbanding the Armenian local militia of 50,000 men at a crucial point of time, coinciding with the westward advance of the Seljuk Turks and their Turcoman allies. Undoing many of the necessary reforms of Isaac I, he bloated the military bureaucracy with highly paid court officials and crowded the Senate with his supporters.

Constantine lost most of Byzantine Italy to the Normans under Robert Guiscard, except for the territory around Bari, though a resurgence of interest in retaining Apulia occurred under his reign, and he appointed at least four catepans of Italy: Miriarch, Maruli, Sirianus, and Mabrica. He also suffered invasions by Alp Arslan in Asia Minor in 1064, resulting in the loss of the Armenian capital, and by the Oghuz Turks in the Balkans in 1065, while Belgrade was lost to the Hungarians.

Already old and unhealthy when he came to power, Constantine died on May 22, 1067. His final act was to demand that only his sons succeed him, forcing his wife Eudokia Makrembolitissa to take a vow not to remarry.

== Romanos Diogenes ==
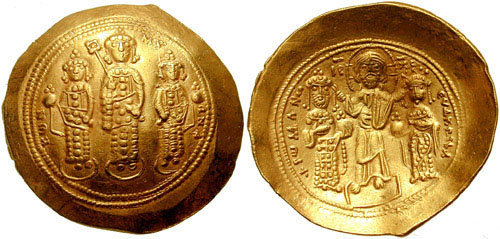
Gold histamenon of Romanos IV: Michael VII Doukas flanked by his brothers Andronikos and Konstantios on the obverse, Romanos IV and Eudokia Makrembolitissa crowned by Christ on the reverse

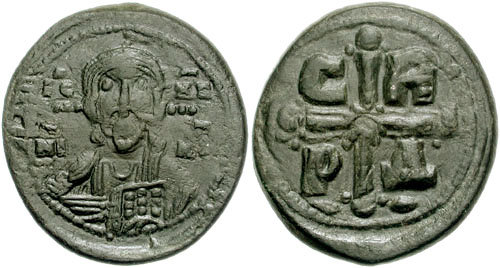
Copper follis of Romanos IV. The obverse shows Christ Pantokrator, while the reverse depicts a cross quartered with the letters ϹΒΡΔ for the motto Σταυρὲ σου βοήθει Ρωμανόν δεσπότην ("Thy Cross aid the Lord Romanos").

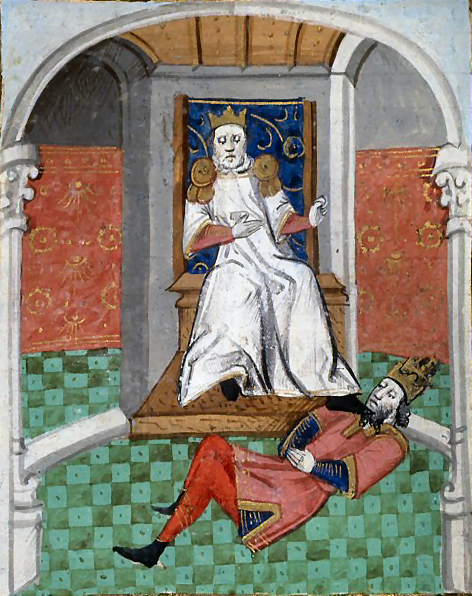
Alp Arslan humiliating Emperor Romanos IV. From a 15th-century illustrated French translation of Boccaccio's De Casibus Virorum Illustrium.

Romanos Diogenes was convicted of attempting to usurp the throne of the sons of Constantine X Doukas in 1067, but he was pardoned by the regent Eudokia Makrembolitissa, who chose him to be her husband and the guardian of her sons as emperor. Eudokia's decision was approved of by Patriarch John Xiphilinos, as due to the Seljuk threat, the army needed to be placed under the command of an able and energetic general. The Senate agreed, and on January 1, 1068, Romanos married the empress and was crowned Emperor of the Romans. Romanos IV was now the senior emperor and guardian of his stepsons and junior co-emperors, Michael VII, Konstantios Doukas, and Andronikos Doukas.

The first military operations of Romanos took place in 1068 and did achieve a measure of success, although the Byzantine province of Syria came under threat by the Saracens of Aleppo who established themselves at Antioch. Plans for the campaign season of 1069 were initially thrown into chaos by a rebellion by one of Romanos' Norman mercenaries, Robert Crispin, whose Frankish troops ravaged the Armeniac Theme even after Cripsin was captured and exiled to Abydos. At the same time, the land around Caesarea was again overrun by the Turks, forcing Romanos to spend precious time and energy in expelling the Turks from Cappadocia. Romanos managed to pacify the province, and marched towards the Euphrates via Melitene, crossing at Romanopolis, in the hope of retaking Akhlat on Lake Van to protect the Armenian frontier. The Turks were hemmed in within the mountains of Cilicia, but they managed to escape to Aleppo after abandoning their plunder. Romanos returned to Constantinople without the great victory he was hoping for.

In 1070, Romanos was detained in Constantinople by administrative issues, and was unable to go on campaign himself. General Manuel Komnenos, nephew of the former emperor Isaac I, and elder brother to the future emperor Alexios was defeated and taken prisoner by a Turkish general named Khroudj. Manuel convinced Khroudj to go to Constantinople and see Romanos in person to conclude an alliance. This triggered an attack on the part of the Seljuk Sultan Alp Arslan, who managed to capture Manzikert and Archesh.

Even while Romanos negotiated with Alp Arslan over the return of Manzikert, he marched at the head of a large army with the intent of recovering the fortress. This led to the fateful Battle of Manzikert of 26 August 1071. Romanos decided to divide his army, dispatching a part to attack Akhlat, while continuing to advance on Manzikert with the main body of the army. He did manage to recapture Manzikert, but became aware of the Seljuk army rapidly approaching. Romanos ordered the forces attacking Akhlat to rejoin him, but these unexpectedly came across another large Turkish army, forcing them to retreat back into Mesopotamia.

Facing a superior force, Romanos was further weakened by his Uzes mercenaries deserting to the enemy. Arslan proposed a peace treaty with favourable terms for Romanos, but the emperor declined, hoping for a decisive military victory. The battle lasted all day without either side gaining any decisive advantage, but as the emperor ordered a part of his centre to return to camp, the order was misunderstood and confusion ensued, which was taken advantage of by Andronikos Doukas, who commanded the reserves, and was the son of Caesar John Doukas, to betray Romanos. Claiming that the emperor was dead, Andronikos marched away from the battle with some 30,000 men who were supposed to cover the army's retreat.

When Romanos became aware of what had happened, he tried to recover the situation by making a defiant stand, fighting valiantly even after his horse had been killed under him, but he was wounded in the hand, which prevented him from wielding a sword, and was soon taken prisoner. Arslan released the emperor against the substantial ransom of 1,500,000 nomismata, with a further 360,000 nomismata to be paid annually.

In the meantime, the opposition faction scheming against Romanos IV decided to exploit the situation. The Caesar John Doukas and Michael Psellos forced Eudokia to retire to a monastery, and they prevailed upon Michael VII to declare Romanos IV deposed. They then refused to honor the agreement made between Arslan and the former emperor. As Romanos returned from captivity, he fought a battle against the Doukas family at Dokeia, but was defeated. He retreated to the fortress of Tyropoion, and from there to Adana in Cilicia. Pursued by Andronikos, he was eventually forced to surrender by the garrison at Adana upon receiving assurances of his personal safety. John Doukas reneged on the agreement and sent men to have Romanos cruelly blinded on June 29, 1072, before sending him into exile to Prote in the Sea of Marmara. Without medical assistance, his wound became infected, and he soon endured a painfully lingering death.

== Michael VII ==
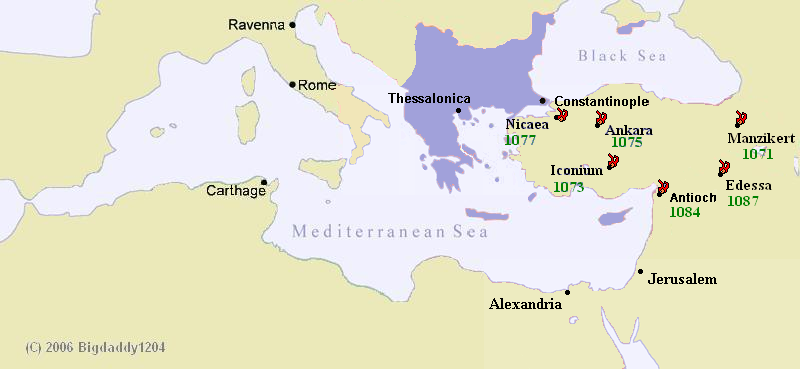
The Seljuq invasion of Anatolia after Manzikert

When Romanos IV was defeated and captured, Michael VII remained in the background, while the initiative was taken by his uncle John Doukas and his tutor Michael Psellos. They conspired to keep Romanos from regaining power after his release from captivity, while Michael felt no obligation to honor the agreement that Romanos struck with the Sultan. After the dispatch of Eudokia to a monastery, Michael VII was crowned again on October 24, 1071, as senior emperor.

Although still advised by Michael Psellos and John Doukas, Michael VII became increasingly reliant on his finance minister Nikephoritzes. The emperor's chief interests, shaped by Psellos, were in academic pursuits, and he allowed Nikephoritzes to increase both taxation and luxury spending without properly financing the army. As an emperor he was incompetent, surrounded by sycophantic court officials, and blind to the empire collapsing around him. The underpaid army tended to mutiny, and the Byzantines lost Bari, their last possession in Italy, to the Normans of Robert Guiscard in 1071. Simultaneously, they faced a serious revolt in the Balkans, where they faced an attempt for the restoration of the Bulgarian state. Although this revolt was suppressed by the general Nikephoros Bryennios, the Byzantine Empire was unable to recover its losses in Asia Minor.

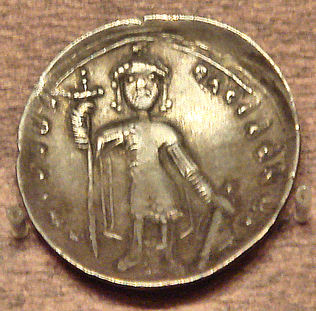
Miliaresion of Michael VII Doukas.

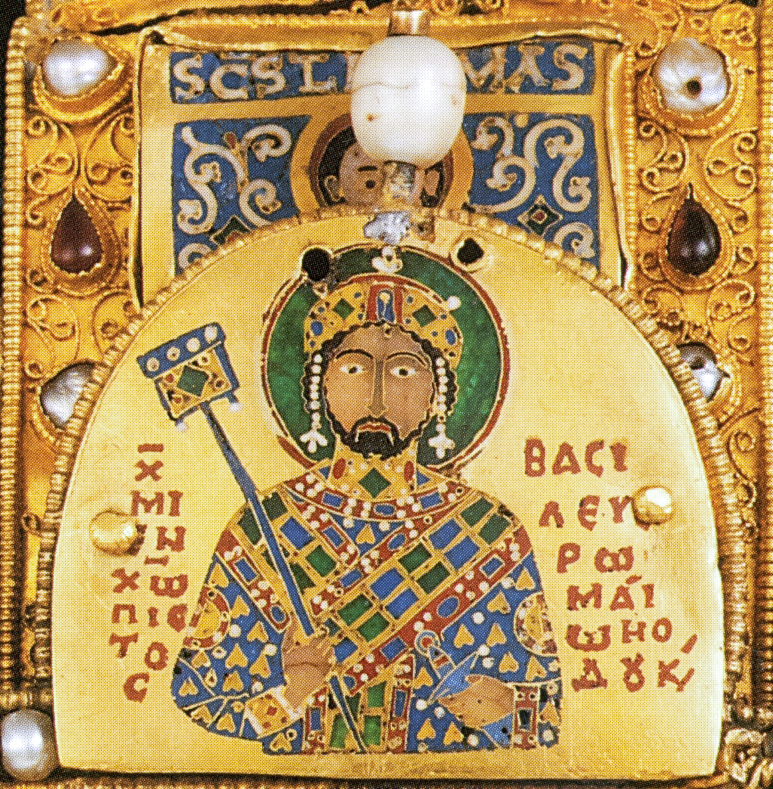
Depiction of Michael VII Doukas on the back of the Holy Crown of Hungary.

After Manzikert, the Byzantine government sent a new army to contain the Seljuk Turks under Isaac Komnenos, a brother of the future emperor Alexios I Komnenos, but this army was defeated and its commander captured in 1073. The problem was made worse by the desertion of the Byzantines' western mercenaries, who became the object of the next military expedition in the area, led by the Caesar John Doukas. This campaign also ended in failure, and its commander was likewise captured by the enemy. The victorious mercenaries now forced John Doukas to stand as pretender to the throne. The government of Michael VII was forced to recognize the conquests of the Seljuks in Asia Minor in 1074, and to seek their support. A new army under Alexios Komnenos, reinforced by Seljuk troops sent by Malik Shah I, finally defeated the mercenaries and captured John Doukas in 1074.

These misfortunes caused widespread dissatisfaction, exacerbated by the devaluation of the currency, which gave the emperor his nickname Parapinakēs, "minus a quarter".

== Nikephoros III ==
In 1078 two generals, Nikephoros Bryennios and Nikephoros Botaneiates, simultaneously revolted in the Balkans and Anatolia, respectively. Botaneiates gained the support of the Seljuk Turks, and he reached Constantinople first.

Nikephoros Botaneiates marched upon Nicaea, where he proclaimed himself emperor. In the face of the threat posed by Nikephoros Bryennios, his election was ratified by the aristocracy and clergy, while Michael VII resigned the throne with hardly a struggle on 31 March 1078 and retired into the Monastery of Stoudios. (Note: Michael VII later became metropolitan of Ephesus and died in Constantinople in c. 1090.)

On 24 March 1078, Nikephoros III Botaneiates entered Constantinople in triumph and was crowned by Patriarch Kosmas I of Constantinople. With the help of his general Alexios Komnenos, he defeated Nikephoros Bryennios and other rivals at Kalavrye but failed to clear the invading Turks out of Asia Minor.

Alexios was ordered to march against his brother-in-law Nikephoros Melissenos in Asia Minor but refused to fight his kinsman. This did not, however, lead to a demotion, as Alexios was needed to counter the expected invasion of the Normans of Southern Italy, led by Robert Guiscard. The Doukas faction at court approached Alexios and convinced him to join a conspiracy against Nikephoros III. The mother of Alexios, Anna Dalassena, was to play a prominent role in this coup d'état of 1081, along with the current empress, Maria of Alania. To aid the conspiracy Maria adopted Alexios as her son, though she was only five years older than he. Alexios and Constantine, Maria's son, were now adoptive brothers, and both Isaac and Alexios took an oath that they would safeguard his rights as emperor.

Isaac and Alexios left Constantinople in mid-February 1081 to raise an army against Botaneiates. After bribing the Western troops guarding the city, Isaac and Alexios Komnenos entered the capital victoriously on 1 April 1081. Alexios was crowned emperor, establishing the Komnenos dynasty.

== See also ==
- Doukas Dynasty and related family tree
- Family trees of the Byzantine imperial dynasties
- Byzantine–Seljuk wars
- Uprising of Georgi Voiteh
- Decline of the Byzantine Empire
- Byzantine Empire under the Justinian dynasty
- Byzantine Empire under the Heraclian dynasty
- Byzantine Empire under the Isaurian dynasty
- Byzantine Empire under the Macedonian dynasty
- Byzantine Empire under the Angelos dynasty
- Byzantine Empire under the Palaiologos dynasty
