= Silvio Arrivabene Valenti Gonzaga =

Italian agronomist and politician

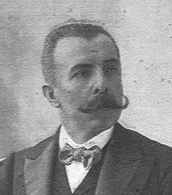
- Born: 5 December 1844; Mantua, Italy
- Died: 11 March 1913 (aged 68); Florence, Italy
- Occupation(s): Politician, agronomist

Silvio Arrivabene Valenti Gonzaga (5 December 1844 – 11 March 1913) was an Italian agronomist and politician. He was born in Mantua to an ancient noble family, many of whose members were active in the Italian Risorgimento, including his father Carlo Arrivabene Valenti Gonzaga, his great-uncle Giovanni Arrivabene, and his uncle Opprandino Arrivabene.

As a young man, he had been jailed for opposing the Austrian response leading to the Belfiore martyrs. During the war for Italian independence, he served in Garibaldi's army and received the Medal of Military Valor for his actions during the siege of Capua. He later served in the Italian Chamber of Deputies from 1890 to 1892 and was made a Senator in 1900. He died suddenly in Florence at the age of 68. His son Giberto Arrivabene Valenti Gonzaga (1872–1933) also served in the Italian Chamber of Deputies and Senate.
