= Decline of the Byzantine Empire =

Sequence of historical events

The Byzantine Empire experienced cycles of growth and decay over the course of nearly a thousand years. After the fall of the Western Roman Empire to Germanic invaders, the emperor Justinian I pursued an ambitious policy of reconquest, resulting in the restoration of Roman rule over much of the Mediterranean, although Britain, Gaul and much of the Iberian Peninsula remained unrecovered. Apart from military conquests, his reign also saw the codification of Roman law and a large construction boom. However, his reign encountered several challenges and crises towards the end of his reign, which included conflicts with the Sasanian Empire and a major plague, as well as religious tensions. His successors were increasingly forced onto the defensive, first against the Sasanians following the deposition of Emperor Maurice in 602 and later against the Islamic expansion (which occurred shortly after Emperor Heraclius' prryhic victory in the final Byzantine Sassanid war), which resulted in the loss of the Levant, Egypt and Africa during the 7th century. At the same time, the Roman Empire lost control over much of Italy to the Lombards, while Slavic peoples settled the Balkans as far south as the Peloponnese and the Avars conducted raids deep into Byzantine territory, which effectively reduced Byzantine control in the Balkans to the coastal areas. In the aftermath, the empire found itself in a near-constant struggle for survival on multiple fronts, with frequent setbacks suffered especially against the Muslim Caliphates and the newly established First Bulgarian Empire, the latter of which conquered much of the remaining possessions on the Balkans from the empire during the 9th and 10th centuries. The empire stabilised under the Isaurian dynasty, when emperors such as Leo III managed to fend off attacks by the Islamic caliphates and other enemy states, which led to the empire experiencing some measure of prosperity.

During the Macedonian period, the Byzantine Empire saw renewed territorial expansion, culminating with the conquest of Bulgaria under the reign of Basil II. Toward the end of the 11th century, however, the empire experienced a catastrophic loss of its heartland territories in Anatolia to the Seljuks following the Battle of Manzikert in 1071 and the ensuing civil war, leading to a migration of Turkic peoples into Anatolia. At the same time, the empire lost its last territory in Italy to the Norman Kingdom of Sicily, and faced repeated attacks on its territory in the Balkans. These events created the context for Emperor Alexios I Komnenos to call to the West for help, which led to the First Crusade and a partial recovery of Anatolia. Alexios and his successors John II and Manuel I Komnenos campaigned successfully in Anatolia and the Balkans, restoring much of the empire's power and prestige. However, the following turmoil and ensuing tensions with the West led to the Sack of Constantinople by the forces of the Fourth Crusade in 1204 and the dismemberment of the empire.

Although a number of small Byzantine successor states survived, one of which eventually reclaimed Constantinople in 1261, the empire had been severely weakened. Under the Palaiologoi, the empire was faced with near constant warfare with the Bulgarian and Serbian Empires, coupled with internal instability, frequent civil wars, and financial difficulties due to trade concessions to the Italian Republics of Venice and Genoa. This led to a growing negligence of the Anatolian frontier, and a gradual loss of territory to the Anatolian Beyliks, most prominently to the Ottomans. The early history of the eventual rise of Ottoman power remains shrouded in obscurity. One Byzantine chronicle refers to a skirmish between "Othman" and Byzantine forces in 1302 in the Marmara region near present day Yalova. By the early 1330s the Ottomans had taken Prusa (Bursa), Nicaea (Iznik), and Nicomedia (Izmit), while the last Byzantine city in Anatolia was taken in 1390.

Constantinople was left isolated as the Islamic empire gained a foothold in the Balkans under the leadership of Orhan Gazi and his son Murad I. They rapidly conquered the Byzantine European heartland over the course of the 14th century, leading to the Fall of Constantinople and the Fall of Trebizond by the army of Sultan Mehmed the Conqueror in the 15th century. Despite continued internal struggles between the Ottomans and the other Turkish rulers in Anatolia, Ottomans managed to conquer Despotate of Morea and Trebizond, the last truly Roman vestiges in Peloponnese and Anatolia respectively. The Ottomans thereafter mostly ignored the conflicts at home to focus on westward expansion into the Christian lands of southeastern Europe.

== Timeline of decline ==
The most significant events generally agreed by historians to have played a role in the decline of the Byzantine Empire are summarised below:

- The Battle of Manzikert in 1071, which saw emperor Romanos IV Diogenes captured by the army of Seljuk Sultan Alp Arslan. The defeat led to a Byzantine civil war lasting ten years, in which eight different revolts took place. The damage was increased by the use of Turkish mercenaries by the various factions, which in some cases led to Turkish occupation of entire cities and regions. A notable example is the revolt of Nikephoros Melissenos in 1080, in which the towns he had occupied and garrisoned with Turkish soldiers in Ionia, Phrygia, Galatia, and Bithynia remained in their hands even after the revolt ended, including Nicaea, which for a time became the capital of the Seljuk Sultanate of Rum.
- The Battle of Myriokephalon in 1176, in which an army led by emperor Manuel I Komnenos attempted to capture the Seljuk capital at Konya, but was ambushed in a narrow mountain pass and defeated by the army of Sultan Kilij Arslan II. The battle is generally considered significant both because it put an end to Byzantine plans to recover central Anatolia, and because of the psychological effect it had both on the emperor himself, and the empire's international reputation. In the years after Manuel's death in 1180, the Seljuks built on their victory by expanding their control at the expense of the Byzantines, while Manuel's teenage successor Alexios II was overthrown in a coup.
- The Sack of Constantinople in 1204 saw the weakened empire partitioned between the Republic of Venice and a Crusader army led by Boniface I, Marquess of Montferrat. A new Latin Empire was established, led by Baldwin I, Latin Emperor. Although Byzantine successor states emerged in Nicaea, Trebizond and Epirus, and went on to reclaim the capital in 1261, many historians cite the loss of the capital as a fatal blow to the Byzantine Empire. Furthermore, Latin Empire claimants continued to harass the Byzantine Empire in the hundred years following the 1261 reconquest.
- The Byzantine civil wars of the 14th century, including the Byzantine civil war of 1321–1328 and the Byzantine civil war of 1341–1347, caused unnecessary infighting which delayed the empire from responding to its nearby powerful neighbors and further destabilized the empire.
- The Fall of Gallipoli in 1354 saw the Ottoman Turks cross into Europe, while the empire was powerless to stop them. This event has been seen by modern historians such as Donald M. Nicol to be the point of no return for the Byzantine Empire, after which its fall was virtually inevitable.

== Causes of the decline ==
=== Political Instability ===
==== Civil wars ====
The period from 1071 to 1081 saw eight revolts:

- 1071–1072: The civil war between Romanos IV Diogenes and Andronikos Doukas.
- 1072: Uprising of Georgi Voiteh
- 1073–1074: Revolt of Roussel de Bailleul proclaims Caesar John Doukas Emperor.
- 1077–1078: Revolt and successful usurpation by Nikephoros III Botaneiates.
- 1077–1078: Revolt of Nikephoros Bryennios the Elder against Michael VII Doukas and Nikephoros III, defeated at the Battle of Kalavrye.
- 1078: Revolt of Philaretos Brachamios against Michael VII Doukas.
- 1078: Revolt of Nikephoros Basilakes against Nikephoros III.
- 1080–1081: Revolt of Nikephoros Melissenos against Nikephoros III.
- 1081: Revolt and successful usurpation by Alexios I Komnenos.

This was followed by a period of secure dynastic rule by the Komnenos dynasty, under Alexios I (1081–1118), John II Komnenos (1118–43) and Manuel I Komnenos (1143–1180). Cumulatively, these three emperors were able to partially restore the empire's fortunes, but they were never able to fully undo the damage caused by the instability at the end of the 11th century, nor return the empire's frontiers to those prior of 1071.

The second period of civil war and collapse took place after Manuel's death in 1180. Manuel's son, Alexios II Komnenos was overthrown in 1183 by Andronikos I Komnenos, whose reign of terror destabilised the empire internally and led to his overthrow and death in Constantinople in 1185. The Angelos dynasty which ruled Byzantium from 1185 to 1204 has been considered one of the most unsuccessful and ineffectual administrations in the empire's history. During this period, Bulgaria and Serbia broke away from the empire, further land was lost to the Seljuk Turks. In 1203, the imprisoned former emperor Alexios IV Angelos escaped jail and fled to the West, where he promised the leaders of the Fourth Crusade generous payment if they would help him regain the throne. These promises later proved to be impossible to keep; in the event, the dynastic squabbling between the weak and ineffectual members of the Angelid dynasty brought about the Sack of Constantinople; Constantinople was burned, pillaged and destroyed, thousands of its citizens were killed, many of the surviving inhabitants fled, and much of the city became a depopulated ruin. The damage to Byzantium was incalculable; many historians point to this moment as a fatal blow in the empire's history. Although the empire was reformed in 1261 by the recapture of the city by forces from the Empire of Nicaea, the damage was never reversed and the empire never returned to anywhere near its former territorial extent, wealth and military power.

The third period of civil war took place in the 14th century. Two separate periods of civil war, again making extensive use of Turkish, Serbian and even Catalan troops, often operating independently under their own commanders, and often raiding and destroying Byzantine lands in the process, ruined the domestic economy and left the state virtually powerless and overrun by its enemies. Conflicts between Andronikos II and Andronikos III, and then later between John VI Kantakouzenos and John V Palaiologos, marked the final ruin of Byzantium. The Byzantine civil war of 1321–1328 allowed the Turks to make notable gains in Anatolia and set up their capital in Prusa 100 kilometers from Constantinople. The civil war of 1341–1347 saw exploitation of the Byzantine Empire by the Serbs, whose ruler took advantage of the chaos to proclaim himself emperor of the Serbs and Greeks. The Serbian king Stefan Uroš IV Dušan made significant territorial gains in Byzantine Macedonia in 1345 and conquered large swathes of Thessaly and Epirus in 1348. In order to secure his authority during the civil war, Kantakouzenos hired Turkish mercenaries. Although these mercenaries were of some use to the Empire, by the time of Byzantine civil war of 1352–1357, Byzantines no longer had any control over them. In 1354 they seized Gallipoli after Tzympe from the Byzantines. By 1354, the empire's territory consisted only of city of Constantinople and Thrace, the city of Thessalonica, and some territory in the Morea. “At that time,” writes Nicephorus Gregoras, “the inhabitants of Constaninople, as well as the population of most of the Byzantine towns of Thrace, suffered from a lack of victuals. While civil war was exhausting Byzantium, the Turks conducted frequent naval incursions from Asia with the help of monemes and triremes galley ships, making their way with impunity into Thrace, especially during harvest season, seizing livestock, carrying off women and children into slavery, and causing such evils that these regions afterward remained depopulated and uncultivated. That was one of the reasons for the famine that the Byzantines had to endure.”

==== Loss of control over revenue ====
Economic concessions to the Italian Republics of Venice and Genoa weakened the empire's control over its finances, especially from the ascension of Michael VIII Palaiologos in the 13th century onward. At this time, it was common for emperors to seek sponsorship from Venice, Genoa, and the Turks. This led to a series of disastrous trade deals with the Italian states; drying up one of the empire's final sources of revenue. This further led to competition between Venice and Genoa to get emperors on the throne who supported their respective trade agenda to the detriment of the other, adding another level of instability to the Byzantine political process.

By the time of the Byzantine–Genoese War (1348–49), only thirteen percent of custom dues passing through the Bosporus strait were going to the Empire. The remaining 87 percent was collected by the Genoese from their colony of Galata. Genoa collected 200,000 hyperpyra from annual custom revenues from Galata, while Constantinople collected a mere 30,000. The loss of control over its revenue sources drastically weakened the Byzantine Empire, hastening its decline. At the same time, the system of Pronoia (land grants in exchange for military service), became increasingly corrupt and dysfunctional by the later empire, and by the 14th century many of the empire's nobles were not paying any tax, nor were they serving in the empire's armies. This further undermined the financial basis of the state and placed further reliance on unreliable mercenaries, which only hasted the empire's demise.

=== Religious strife ===
==== The failed Union of the Churches ====
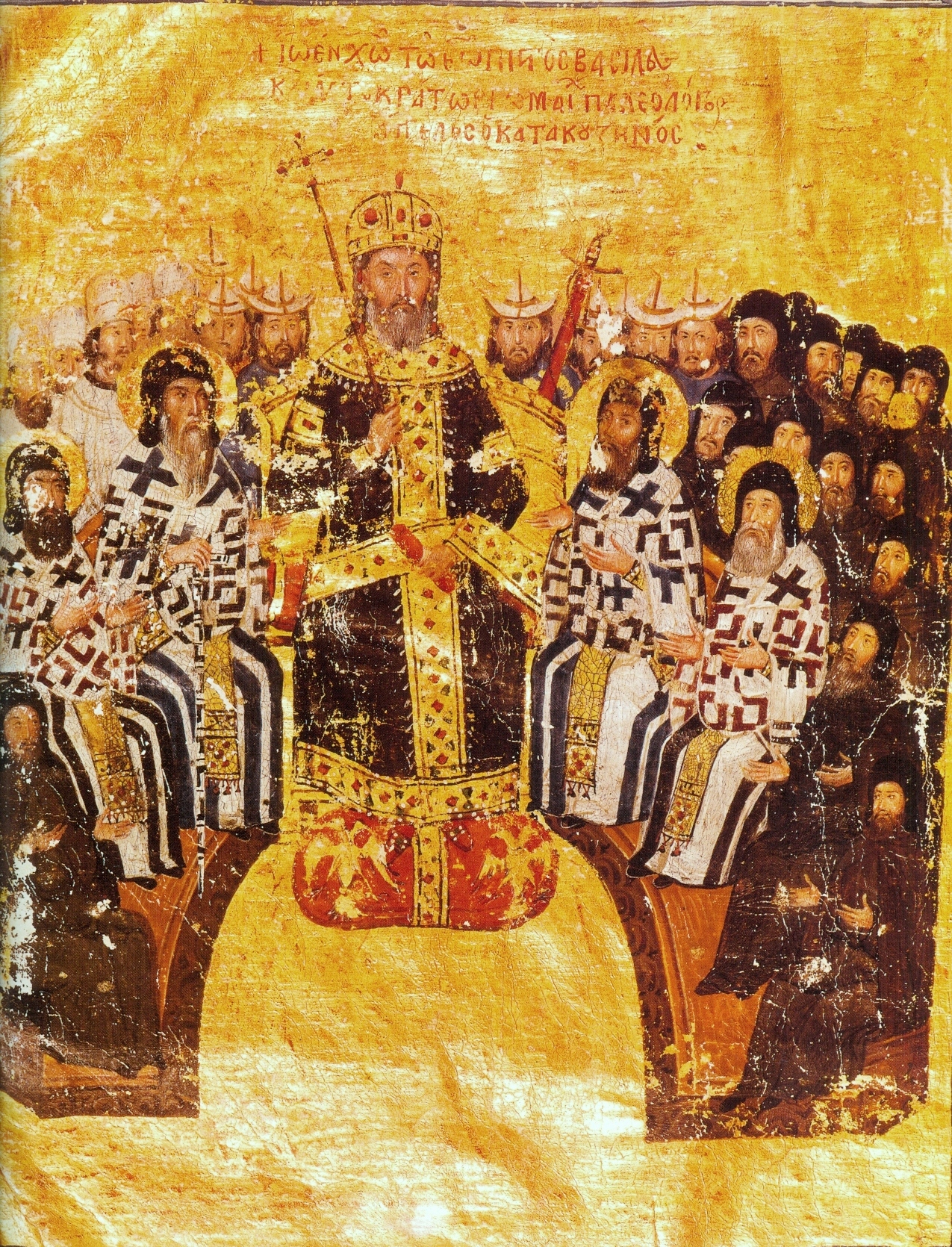
John VI Kantakouzenos presiding over a synod of Orthodox clergy in 1351. Despite the repudiation of Unionism after 1282, Byzantium was unable to restore religious harmony. John VI abdicated in 1354 after the civil war with John V Palaiologos weakened the empire

Emperor Michael VIII Palaiologos signed a union with the Catholic church in the 13th century in the hope of staving off the Western attack, but the policy had mixed results. The empire's Western enemies attempted to reclaim the Latin Empire in spite of the union, while the social divisions the deeply unpopular union created inside the empire were damaging to Byzantine society.

Byzantine envoys presented themselves at the Second Council of Lyons on 24 June 1274. On the fourth session of the Council the formal act of union was performed, However with Pope Gregory's death (January 1276), the hoped-for gains did not materialize.

While the union was opposed at all levels of society, it was especially opposed by the greater populace, led by the monks and the adherents of the deposed Patriarch Arsenios, known as the Arsenites. One of the chief anti-unionist leaders was Michael's sister Eulogia (aka Irene), who fled to the court of her daughter Maria Palaiologina Kantakouzene, Tsarina of the Bulgars, from where she intrigued unsuccessfully against Michael. More serious was the opposition of the sons of Michael of Epirus, Nikephoros I Komnenos Doukas and his half-brother John the Bastard: they posed as the defenders of Orthodoxy and gave support to the anti-unionists fleeing Constantinople. Michael at first responded with comparative leniency, hoping to win the anti-unionists through persuasion, but eventually, the virulence of the protests led him to resort to force. Many anti-unionists were blinded or exiled. Two prominent monks, Meletios and Ignatios, were punished: the first had his tongue cut out, and the second was blinded. Even imperial officials were harshly treated, and the death penalty was decreed even for simply reading or possessing pamphlets directed against the Emperor. "From the intensity of these disorders, tantamount almost to civil wars," concludes Geanakoplos, "it might appear that too great a price had been paid for the sake of union."

The religious situation only worsened for Michael. The Arsenite party found widespread support amongst the discontented in the Anatolian provinces, and Michael responded there with similar viciousness: according to Vryonis, "These elements were either removed from the armies or else, alienated, they deserted to the Turks". Another attempt to clear the encroaching Turkmen from the Meaender valley in 1278 found limited success, but Antioch on the Maeander was irretrievably lost as were Tralles and Nyssa four years later.

On 1 May 1277, John the Bastard convoked a synod at Neopatras that anathematized the Emperor, Patriarch, and Pope as heretics. In response, a synod was convoked at the Hagia Sophia on 16 July where both Nikephoros and John were anathematized in return. John called a final synod at Neopatras in December 1277, where an anti-unionist council of eight bishops, a few abbots, and one hundred monks, again anathematized the Emperor, Patriarch, and Pope.

==== Persecution of the Armenians ====
The Armenians were persecuted due to their belief in Monophysite Christology which the Byzantines saw as a heresy. The persecution of Armenians had enormous consequences for the eastern defenses of the Byzantine empire. The conquests of the Seljuk Turks was made much easier than it otherwise would have been due to the Christian peoples fighting among themselves. Byzantine Emperor Constantine IX Monomachos was frustrated with the continued resistance of the Armenians and so secretly contacted the Seljuk sultan Tugrul Beg in 1044 and urged him to attack the Armenian capital of Ani, in an effort to destabilise them.

When the Turks invaded their land, the Armenians doggedly resisted and likely would have continued to defend themselves, but in 1045 Emperor Constantine IX Monomachos, believing that this mountainous region would serve as an effective barrier against any eastern powers, decided to annex and disarmed significant areas of their kingdom, and took much of its wealth back to Constantinople. An Armenian Chronicler explains that in this manner, “the sterile, effeminate and ignoble nation the Greeks, delivered up Armenia to the Turks,” In the middle of the eleventh century, The Armenian historian Aristakes Lastivertsi recounts the Byzantine campaigns in Armenia:

In these days Byzantine armies entered the land of Armenia four times in succession until they had rendered the whole country uninhabited through sword, fire, and captive-taking. When I think about these calamities my senses take leave of me, my brain becomes befuddled, and terror makes my hands tremble so that I cannot continue my composition. For it is a bitter narration, worthy of copious tears.

The persecution that the Armenians suffered at the hands of the Byzantine government became so bad that many Armenian troops upon which the Byzantines were relying to man the border defenses deserted their posts, leading Lastivertsi to lament: “The cavalry wanders about lordlessly, some in Persia, some in Greece, some in Georgia.” Some Armenians even joined the Seljuks in their jihad raids into Byzantine territory.

While all of this was happening, a portion of the Byzantine army rebelled against the emperor Michael VI. The Turks were well aware of the infighting among the Christians and took full advantage of the situation. Lastivertsi says: “As soon as the Persians [Turks] realized that [the Byzantine nobles] were fighting and opposing one another, they boldly arose and came against us, ceaselessly raiding, destructively ravaging.”

Since the 10th century the Byzantine Empire had followed a policy of removing prominent nakharars (Armenian lords) from their native lands, absorbing those lands in the structure of the empire, and giving the nakharars in exchange lands and titles elsewhere. The Byzantine policy of removing important lords from their Armenian lands and settling them elsewhere (principally on imperial territory, in Cappadocia and northern Mesopotamia) proved to be extremely shortsighted in two ways. First, it left eastern Asia Minor devoid of its native defenders. Second, it worsened the ethnic tensions between the Greeks and the Armenians due to the introduction of thousands of Armenian newcomers into Cappadocia. Constantine X worsened this error by disbanding a 50,000-man local Armenian army, ostensibly to save money. As a result, the land was left defenseless as well as leaderless in the face of the Turkish invasions that came soon after.

The second wave of Armenians that moved westwards was after the battle of Manzikert (to flee the brutal Turkic raids). After severe persecutions of the Armenian and Syriac Monophysite non-Calcedonian communities, several Armenian royal families, which included Adom and Abucahl of Vaspuracan and Gagik of Ani, used the opportunity provided by the invasion of the Seljuk Turks to seek vengeance upon the local Greek Orthodox population. This included the pillage of wealthy estates and the torture and assassination of the Orthodox metropolitan bishop of Caesarea. Gagik was eventually killed by the local Greek landowners.

The Annexation of Armenia ultimately proved to be a strategic disaster for the Byzantines. The Armenian Princes provided a secure buffer zone on the Byzantines eastern border. The overextended Byzantines had found themselves sharing a wide border with a large and powerful empire of nomadic horse archers whose style of fighting they were not used to, and they could no longer rely on the Armenians (who they had disarmed and persecuted) for assistance.

=== Dwindling military institutions ===
==== Fall of the theme system ====
The disintegration of the Byzantine Empire's traditional military organization, the theme system, played a role in its decline. Under this arrangement, which was in its heyday from about 650 to 1025, the empire was divided into several regions which contributed locally raised troops to the imperial armies. The system provided an effective means of cheaply mobilizing large numbers of men, and the result was a comparatively large and powerful force – the army of the theme of Thrakesion alone had provided about 9,600 men in the period 902–936, for example. But from the 11th century onwards, the theme system was allowed to decay. This played a major role in the loss of Anatolia to the Turks at the end of that century.

In the 12th century, the Komnenian dynasty re-established an effective military force. Manuel I Komnenos, for example, was able to muster an army of over 40,000 men. However, the theme system was never replaced by a viable long-term alternative, and the result was an empire that depended more than ever before on the strengths of each individual emperor or dynasty. The collapse of imperial power and authority after 1180 revealed the inadequacy of this approach. After the deposition of Andronikos I Komnenos in 1185, the dynasty of the Angeloi oversaw a period of military decline. From 1185 onwards, Byzantine emperors found it increasingly difficult to muster and pay for sufficient military forces, while the failure of their efforts to sustain their empire exposed the limitations of the entire Byzantine military system, dependent as it was on competent personal direction from the emperor.

Despite the restoration under the Palaiologoi, Byzantium never reached the heights of its pre-1204 past. By the 13th century, the imperial army numbered a mere 6,000 men. As one of the main institutional strengths of the Byzantine state, the demise of the theme system left the empire lacking in underlying structural strengths.

==== Excessive reliance on mercenaries ====
As far back as the Justinian reconquest of Africa by the general Belisarius, foreign soldiers were used in war. While the foreign military intervention was not an altogether new occurrence, the reliance on it, and its ability to damage political, social, and economic institutions were dramatically increased in the 11th, 13th, 14th, and 15th centuries. The 11th century saw increasing tensions between courtly and military factions. Until the 11th century, the empire had long been under the control of the military factions with leaders such as Basil II, and John I Tzimiskes, however, the crisis of Basil II's succession led to increasing uncertainty in the future of politics. The army demanded Constantine VIII's daughters ascend to the throne of their relation to Basil II, leading several marriages, and increasing power for the courtly faction. This culminated after the failed Battle of Manzikert. As civil wars broke out, and tensions between courtly and military factions reached a zenith, the demand for soldiers led to the hiring of Turkish mercenaries. These mercenaries aided in the Byzantine loss of Anatolia by drawing more Turkish soldiers into the interior of the empire, and by giving the Turks an increasing presence in Byzantine politics. These interventions also led to further destabilization of the political system.

Reliance on foreign military intervention, and sponsorship for political motives, continued even during the Komnenian Restoration, Alexius I used Turkish mercenaries in the civil wars he participated in with Nikephoros III Botaneiates. In 1204, Alexios IV Angelos relied on Latin soldiers to claim the throne of Byzantium, leading to the sack of Constantinople, and the creation of the successor states.

==== Degeneration of the standing army ====
After a century of successful expansions due to the competent Emperors between Basil I and Basil II, a false sense of security seemed to have prevailed among the new Byzantine leadership. According to J.F.C. Fuller, rule “passed into the hands of a series of dotards, sensualists and courtesans—female rule once again predominated.” During her 29-year reign Empress Zoe Porphyrogenita married and divorced (often by blinding or murdering) several men. Concern for the frontier and its defence was largely dropped; the empire's resources were spent on the luxuries of the civil bureaucracy, which came to dominate the byzantine government and ruled in all but name.

While Armenia was being ravaged by the Seljuks, Byzantine rulers showed little interest in what was happening along its eastern borders. The indifferent and “squanderous” lifestyle of Empress Zoe Porphyrogenita was the beginning of the "utter decline in our national affairs and the cause of our subsequent humiliation,” says Michael Psellus. Her successors were not much better. Alfred Friendly reports that "Neither Constantine IX nor his advisers gave any evidence that they appreciated at the time the danger of the Seljuk raids, mounting in frequency, extent and success during his reign.” The most they did was make treaties with Sultan Tughril; and when roaming bands of Turks broke the treaty by raiding and pillaging Byzantine territory, and Constantinople objected, Sultan Tughril feigned innocence by claiming he was unable to control these “lone wolves,” even as they continued raiding deeper and deeper into western Anatolia.

During this time, recruitment of the Anatolian peasants whom the Byzantines relied on for many centuries drastically fell; “indifferent foreigners were enlisted, arms, artillery and warlike stores neglected, and castles and fortresses allowed to fall in ruin.” In short, “the legacy of the civilian bureaucrats and of the emperors who were their nominees and puppets—profligate spenders on their own ostentations and miserly providers for their armies—was a defenseless Asia Minor. Turks raided at will, ever further to the west.”

=== Foreign threats ===
==== Compromised borders ====
In the years following the Arab conquests of the Middle-East, Byzantium entered a period of dealing with a powerful and organized enemy on its eastern frontier, while also dealing with less organized but persistent raiding on its western and Italian frontiers. Eventually, the Muslim threat would begin to fracture and wane while Byzantium itself rebuilt strength and was able to tame its western frontiers, absorbing Bulgaria and vassalizing countries such as Croatia. This led to a brief window of Byzantine hegemony in Eastern Europe and Anatolia. However, in the later parts of the 11th century, new threats would emerge from both sides. The most famous of these new opponents was the arrival of the Seljuk Turks upon the Anatolian plateau. Certainly, this threat proved dire, but other threats also emerged on the western, northern, and Italian flanks. In the west and in Italy, the Normans proved a strong opponent in areas once thought secure. The Normans proved to be more than a match for Byzantine arms, inflicting a severe defeat at the Battle of Dyrrachium and establishing a foothold in Greece. They would drive Byzantium out of Italy, conquering the last Byzantine city of Bari in 1071. While Byzantium had dealt with western threats before, the Normans' level of organization and military strength made them a new challenge: an existential threat from the West that could conquer Byzantine territory, as demonstrated by Roussel de Bailleul's attempt to create a realm in Anatolia for himself. In the north, new tribes of nomadic raiders such as the Uzes, Pechenegs, and Cumans would begin to raid across the Danube, creating a third front for the Imperial armies to deal with, in addition to both Norman and Turkish wars. While the empire would initially survive this crisis, the new demands on Byzantine martial strength would greatly drain the Empire of critical resources, and the new reality Byzantium found itself in would persist until the final fall of the Empire in 1453.

The Norman menace to the Empire would continue until 1185 and the failed Norman expedition that managed to sack Thessalonica before being defeated. However, they would be replaced newly risen western powers such as Venice. Even following the reestablishment of the Empire following the Fourth Crusade, the Byzantines would be under constant threat of invasion from actors such as Charles of Anjou who sought to restore the fallen Latin Empire or impose papal supremacy on the Eastern Orthodox Church. More regionally, Serbia would prove to be a very challenging foe in the fourteenth century, seizing much land in the Byzantine civil war of 1341–1347 that only proved to further weaken the Empire. In the north, Bulgaria would rise again in 1185 and have friction with the Empire for the next two hundred years, at several times taking forts or territory in periods of imperial weakness. In the east, the Seljuk Turks would constantly raid Byzantine territories on the frontier. These would be replaced by the Turkish beyliks and eventually the Ottoman Turks in the late thirteenth to fourteenth centuries.

The cumulative result of perpetually insecure borders was a mostly gradual, though at times dire, inability to respond to major threats simultaneously and a continual drain on fiscal and military resources. Throughout the 1040s and onward, Byzantium's defensive wars would prove a constant strain on the budget. And if the main imperial army was in one location, that would come at the cost of not being able to respond to another location. When in the 1050s to 1080s three new fronts opened at the same time, Byzantium was unable to field sufficient resources to meet all three effectively. These fronts never totally closed, only compounding the problem and leaving Byzantium ripe for damage from a powerful opponent, as it would suffer in the 1080s to the Seljuks and 1204 to the fourth crusade.

==== Latin Crusaders ====
Though the Crusades assisted Byzantium in driving back some of the Turks, they went far beyond the military assistance envisaged by Alexios I. Instead of following the strategic necessities of the war against the Turks, the Crusaders were focused on the quest of re-conquering Jerusalem, and instead of returning territory to Byzantium, the Crusaders established their own principalities, becoming a territorial rival to Byzantine interests in their own right.

This was true already during the Third Crusade, which induced emperor Isaac II Angelos to make a secret alliance with Saladin to impede the progress of Frederick Barbarossa, but open conflict between Crusaders and Byzantium erupted in the Fourth Crusade, resulting in the Sack of Constantinople in 1204. Constantinople was now itself a Crusader state, known as the Latin Empire in historiography, but from the Greek perspective as Frankokratia or "rule of the Franks". Vestiges of imperial power were preserved in regional realms, the Nicaean Empire, Trebizond and Epirus. Much of the Nicaean Emperors' efforts now went into combating the Latins, and even after Constantinople was returned to Byzantine rule under the Palaiologoi in 1261, the Empire exerted much of its efforts into defeating its Latin neighbours, contributing to the eventual failure of the Crusades by 1291. However, Crusaders themselves relocated to Byzantine territory by forcibly conquered Rhodes in 1310.

==== Rise of the Seljuks and Ottomans ====
No emperor after the Komnenian period was in a position to expel the Turks from Asia Minor, while the preoccupation of the Nicaean emperors with the attempt to recover Constantinople meant that resources were diverted away from Asia Minor and towards the west. The result was a weakening of the Byzantine defenses in the region, which, when combined with insufficient resources, alienating policy, and incompetent leadership, led to the complete loss of all the empire's Asian territory to the Turks by 1338.

The disintegration of the Seljuk Turks led to the rise of the Ottoman Turks. Their first important leader was Osman I Bey, who attracted Ghazi warriors and carved out a domain in north-western Asia Minor. Attempts by the Byzantine Emperors to drive back the Ottomans were unsuccessful, and ceased in 1329 with the Battle of Pelekanon. Following a number of civil disputes in the Byzantine Empire, the Ottomans subjugated the Byzantines as vassal state in 1371 and attempts to relieve this vassal status culminated in the Fall of Constantinople in 1453.

===== Turkic devastation of Anatolia =====
Apostolos Vakalopoulos Describes the Devastation the Seljuk raids had on Anatolia:

At the beginning of the eleventh century, the Seljuk Turks forced their way into Armenia and there crushed the armies of several petty Armenian states. No fewer than forty thousand souls fled before the organized pillage of the Seljuk host to the western part of Asia Minor…. From the middle of the eleventh century, and especially after the battle of Malazgirt [Manzikurt] (1071), the Seljuks spread throughout the whole Asia Minor peninsula, leaving terror, panic and destruction in their wake. Byzantine, Turkish and other contemporary sources are unanimous in their agreement on the extent of havoc wrought and the protracted anguish of the local population…evidence as we have proves that the Hellenic population of Asia Minor, whose very vigor had so long sustained the Empire and might indeed be said to have constituted its greatest strength, succumbed so rapidly to Turkish pressure that by the fourteenth century, it was confined to a few limited areas. By that time, Asia Minor was already being called Turkey…one after another, bishoprics and metropolitan sees which once throbbed with Christian vitality became vacant and ecclesiastical buildings fell into ruins. The metropolitan see of Chalcedon, for example, disappeared in the fourteenth century, and the sees of Laodicea, Kotyaeon (now Kutahya) and Synada in the fifteenth…. With the extermination of local populations or their precipitate flight, entire villages, cities, and sometimes whole provinces fell into decay. There were some fertile districts like the valley of the Maeander River, once stocked with thousands of sheep and cattle, which were laid waste and thereafter ceased to be in any way productive. Other districts were literally transformed into wildernesses. Impenetrable thickets sprang up in places where once there had been luxuriant fields and pastures. This is what happened to the district of Sangarius, for example, which Michael VIII Palaeologus had known formerly as a prosperous, cultivated land, but whose utter desolation he afterwards surveyed in utmost despair…. The mountainous region between Nicaea and Nicomedia, opposite Constantinople, once clustered with castles, cities, and villages, was depopulated. A few towns escaped total destruction—Laodicea, Iconium, Bursa (then Prusa), and Sinope, for example—but the extent of devastation elsewhere was such as to make a profound impression on visitors for may years to come. The fate of Antioch provides a graphic illustration of the kind of havoc wrought by the Turkish invaders: in 1432, only three hundred dwellings could be counted inside its walls, and its predominantly Turkish or Arab inhabitants subsisted by raising camels, goats, cattle, and sheep. Other cities in the southeastern part of Asia Minor fell into similar decay.

Quoting contemporary authorities, J. Laurent writes: “It is difficult even to imagine the complete ruin the Turks left behind them. Whatever they could reach, men or crops, nothing remained alive; and a week was sufficient under dread of famine to force them to abandon the most prosperous areas. On their departure all that was left were devastated fields, trees cut down, mutilated corpses and towns driven mad by fear or in flames.’”’ At Armorium, it is said, 100,000 people perished, and at Touch 120,000 were massacred and 150,000 sold into slavery—thus the destruction went on. Whole districts were depopulated. ‘When the Turks had passed by, such as were left alive feared to return...trusting in neither the walls of their cities, nor the crags of the mountains, they crowded into Constantinople where they were decimated by plague. In a few years Cappadocia, Phrygia, Bithynia, and Paphlagonia lost the greater part of their Greek population.” J. Laurent writes further:“In brief, the population of Asia Minor vanished before the Turks. The people fled far away, or shut themselves up in their Cities, or sought refuge in the mountains which border the central plateau of the peninsula. The valleys and the plains which stretch from Caesarea and Sebaste to Nicaea and Sardes remained all but empty. And as they fell fallow, the Turks with their tents and their flocks wandered over them contentedly, as they had done in the deserts out of which they had come"

Demetrios Cydones on the Turkish depredations in Anatolia:

They took from us all the lands which we enjoyed from the Hellespont eastward to the mountains of Armenia. The cities they razed to the ground, pillaged the religious sanctuaries, broke open the graves, and filled all with blood and corpses. They outraged the souls of the inhabitants, forcing them to deny God and giving to them their own defiled mysteries. They abused their [Christians’] souls, alas, with wanton outrage! Denuding them of all property and their freedom, they left the [Christians as] weak images of slaves, exploiting the remaining strength of the wretched ones for their own prosperity.

According to Speros Vryonis:

The conquest, or should I say the conquests of Asia Minor were in operation over a period of four centuries. Thus the Christian societies of Asia Minor were submitted to extensive periods of intense warfare, incursions, and destructions which undermined the existence of the Christian church. In the first century of Turkish conquests and invasions from the mid-eleventh to the late twelfth century, the sources reveal that some 63 towns and villages were destroyed. The inhabitants of other towns and villages were enslaved and taken off to the Muslim slave markets.

Byzantine princess Anna Komnene says:

And since the succession of Diogenes the barbarians tread upon the boundaries of the empire of the Rhomaioi…the barbarian hand was not restricted until the reign of my father. Swords and spears were whetted against the Christians, and also battles, wars, and massacres. Cities were obliterated, lands were plundered, and the whole land of the Rhomaioi was stained by blood of Christians. Some fell piteously [the victims] of arrows and spears, other being driven away from their homes were carried off captive to the cities of Persia. Terror reigned over all and they hastened to hide in the caves, forests, mountains, and hills. Among them some cried aloud in horror at those things which they suffered, being led off to Persia; and others who yet survived (if some did remain within the Rhomaic boundaries), lamenting, cried, the one for his son, the other for his daughter. One bewailed his brother, another his cousin who had died previously, and like women shed hot tears. And there was at that time not one relationship which was without tears and without sadness.

A Letter written by Manuel II Palaiologos in 1391 to Demetrios Kydones makes specific reference to the Turkish threat to the Byzantine Empire, noting how the Greek Christian inhabitants of Anatolia "have fled to the clefts in the rocks, to the forests, and to the mountain heights in an effort to escape a death from which there is no escape, a very cruel and inhuman death without any semblance of justice…. Nobody is spared, neither very young children nor defenseless women. For those whom old age or illness prevents from running away there is no hope of escaping the murderous blade."

Historian Warren Treadgold gives a summary on the historical background highlighting the cumulative effects of the relentless Turkish depredations against the Byzantine Empire in its Anatolian heartland by the late 14th century:

As the Turks raided and conquered, they enslaved many Christians, selling some in other Muslim regions and hindering the rest from practicing their faith. Conversions [to islam], Turkish migration, and Greek outmigration increasingly endangered the Greek minority in central Asia Minor. When the Turks overran Western Anatolia, they occupied the countryside first, driving the Greeks into the cities, or away to Europe, or the islands. By the time the Anatolian cities fell, the land around them was already largely Turkish.

In contrast, the Ottoman beylik of Osman, whose territory faced the Sea of Bosporus facing Constantinople, used a strategy of accommodation and incorporation. The Byzantine inhabitants of Asia Minor were tolerated by the Ottomans, many of which would rather accept Ottoman security over the militarily declining Byzantine Empire.

== See also ==
- Succession to the Byzantine Empire
- Byzantine Dark Ages in the 7th–8th centuries
- Byzantine-Lombard wars
- Byzantine–Seljuq wars
- Byzantine Empire under the Doukas dynasty
- Byzantine Empire under the Angelos dynasty
- Byzantine Empire under the Palaiologos dynasty
- List of Byzantine revolts and civil wars

== Bibliography ==
- Angold, Michael (1997). The Byzantine Empire, 1025–1204. Longman. ISBN 0-582-29468-1.
- Haldon, John (2002). Byzantium – A History. Tempus. ISBN 0-7524-2343-6.
- Harris, Jonathan (2003). Byzantium and the Crusades. Hambledon and London. ISBN 1-85285-298-4.
- Alan Harvey, "Economic expansion in the Byzantine empire, 900–1200"
- John Haldon, "The Byzantine Wars"
- J.W. Birkenmeier, The Development of the Komnenian Army 1081–1180
- Magdalino, Paul, The empire of Manuel I Komnenos 1143–1180
- Norwich, John Julius (1998). A Short History of Byzantium. Penguin. ISBN 0-14-025960-0.
- Runciman, Steven. The Fall of Constantinople 1453. Cambridge: Cambridge University Press, 1965.
- Vryonis, Speros. The Decline of Medieval Hellenism in Asia Minor and the Process of Islamization from the Eleventh through the Fifteenth Century. Berkeley: University of California Press, 1971.
