= Byzantine Dark Ages =

Era of the Byzantine Empire in the 7th and 8th centuries

Byzantine Dark Ages is a historiographical term for the period in the history of the Eastern Roman (Byzantine) Empire, from around c. 630 to the 760s, which marks the transition between the late antique early Byzantine period and the "medieval" middle Byzantine era. The "Dark Ages" are characterized by widespread upheavals and transformation of the Byzantine state and society, resulting in a paucity of primary historical sources.

== Collapse ==
The 7th century was a watershed in the history of the Byzantine Empire. At its beginning, the Eastern Roman Empire still controlled most of the Mediterranean Basin's shores and faced the Sassanian Empire as its main eastern rival. The Fall of the Western Roman Empire had eroded this traditional order, and despite Emperor Justinian I's wars of reconquest in the 6th century, many of his gains in Italy and Spain were quickly undone. But it was still recognizably the late antique world dominated by the Roman Empire, with the Mediterranean mare nostrum as its center of gravity and cities as the main social and economic unit.

The final Byzantine-Sassanid War weakened this world, but the Muslim conquests of the 7th century shattered it for good. The emergent caliphate was not only far more powerful and threatening than Persia had ever been, but it also shattered the political unity of the Mediterranean world and moved the center of power east, first to Damascus and then to Baghdad. Byzantium was left territorially crippled, reduced to the status of a peripheral power, and on a permanent defensive against invaders from all sides.

== Transformation ==
This crisis led to a profound transformation in the nature and culture of the Byzantine state, that was not completed until the 9th century, when the Muslim pressure on the Empire slackened. The Byzantine state that emerged "was an empire and culture focused on emperor and capital." It was also much more militarized: The civilian late-antiquity administrative structure, put in place by Diocletian and his successors, was replaced by the themes, each governed by a military commander (strategos, "general"). The rigid distinction between civilian and military hierarchies, which was a hallmark of the late antique system, was thus abolished. With the territorial losses reducing the Empire to its core territories in Anatolia and parts of the Balkans, the administration was streamlined, with the central government essentially absorbing the old provincial administration of the praetorian prefectures into a centralized, court-centered hierarchy. In the process, the handful of great departments of late antiquity were replaced by a series of smaller, more narrowly focused fiscal bureaus, all of roughly equal status. Another change was that Greek also finally replaced Latin as the language of administration during this period.

The Muslim conquests, coupled with the Slavic migrations to the Balkans around the same time, resulted in the breakdown of the late-antiquity social order. In some instances, cities were reduced to small fortified settlements, notable mainly as defensive bastions and market centers; the Byzantine capital, Constantinople, remained highly populated. The provincial aristocracy declined; offices such as the decurions of the cities disappeared and with them the political functions of the landed aristocracy. The great landholders of late antiquity were ruined by the constant invasions, and those who survived appear to have left the cities to fortified country estates. Many of the provincial aristocracy during this period managed to retain — or gain — their positions through holding offices in the themes, and gradually, they too became militarized.

Education suffered a severe blow during this period. Some form of higher education was still available in the capital; albeit, there too few figures of prominence are known, and private education was still available for the wealthy, but acquiring it was much more difficult. In particular, education in Roman law, which had been the basis for a public career, suffered an abrupt decline, aided by the fact that legal teaching had traditionally been in the hands of a small group of mostly pagan professors. The numerical and qualitative decline of the educated classes had, as a result, the decline in the number of philological works produced, as the remaining audience for such works was small and diminishing with every passing year. Art and architecture followed suit, with many quarries being abandoned. Apart from fortifications —often quite hastily executed — almost all building activity ceased during this period.

== Historical sources ==
Examining this crucial period in Byzantine history has posed many difficulties to modern scholars, as the Byzantine historical sources about it are few and mostly originated later than the period itself. No Byzantine historical source is known from the end of the last great Byzantine–Sassanid war around 630 until the late 8th century, when Patriarch Nikephoros I of Constantinople wrote his Brief History, followed a few decades later by the Chronicle of Theophanes the Confessor. Administrative and legal sources are also scarce, with the "Farmer's Law" and the "Rhodian Sea Law" the only exceptions. Much of the information for this period is thus derived from non-Byzantine sources, such as the Arab historians, as well as Armenian and Syriac sources from the Empire's periphery, although many of them are of a later date as well.

Theological works are an exception to this scarcity of sources, but again, due to the decline of the educated classes in Byzantium itself, most of these were written in the Empire's periphery or indeed in lands controlled by the caliphate, while works from Constantinople are almost entirely absent. Active theologians include Maximus the Confessor and Germanus I of Constantinople, while scholars such as John of Damascus were active in Syria after the early Muslim conquests.

== See also ==
- Dark Ages (historiography)
- Byzantine Iconoclasm
- Macedonian Renaissance
- Decline of the Byzantine Empire in the Late Middle Ages
