= Byzantine Empire under the Komnenos dynasty =

Period of Byzantine history from 1081 to 1185

Byzantine Empire: Βασιλεία Ῥωμαίων (Ancient Greek); Imperium Romanum (Latin)
- 1081–1185
- The Byzantine Empire at the death of Manuel I Komnenos in 1180.
- Capital: Constantinople
- Common languages: Greek, Armenian, Aromanian, Old Bulgarian, Old Anatolian Turkish and other South Slavic languages
- Religion: Eastern Orthodox Church
- Government: Semi-feudal monarchy
- Emperor
  - 1081–1118: Alexios I
  - 1118–1143: John II
  - 1143–1180: Manuel I
  - 1180–1183: Alexios II
  - 1183–1185: Andronikos I
- History
  - Battle of Manzikert: 26 August 1071
  - Coronation of Alexios I: 4 April 1081
  - The First Crusade is declared: 27 November 1095
  - Battle of Myriokephalon: 17 September 1176
  - Deposition of Andronikos I: 12 September 1185
Preceded by
Byzantine Empire under the Doukas dynasty
Succeeded by
Byzantine Empire under the Angelos dynasty
Second Bulgarian Empire
Kingdom of Duklja

The Byzantine Empire was ruled by emperors of the Komnenos dynasty for a period of 104 years, from 1081 to about 1185. The Komnenian (also spelled Comnenian) period comprises the reigns of five emperors, Alexios I, John II, Manuel I, Alexios II and Andronikos I. It was a period of sustained, though ultimately incomplete, restoration of the military, territorial, economic and political position of the Byzantine Empire.

Byzantium under the Komnenoi played a key role in the history of the Crusades in the Holy Land, while also exerting enormous cultural and political influence in Europe, the Near East, and the lands around the Mediterranean Sea. The Komnenian emperors, particularly John and Manuel, exerted great influence over the Crusader states of Outremer, whilst Alexios I played a key role in the course of the First Crusade, which he helped bring about.

Moreover, it was during the Komnenian period that contact between Byzantium and the 'Latin' Christian West, including the Crusader states, was at its most crucial stage. Venetian and other Italian traders became resident in Constantinople and the empire in large numbers (60–80,000 'Latins' in Constantinople alone), and their presence together with the numerous Latin mercenaries who were employed by Manuel in particular helped to spread Byzantine technology, art, literature and culture throughout the Roman Catholic west. Above all, the cultural impact of Byzantine art on the west at this period was enormous and of long lasting significance.

The Komnenoi also made a significant contribution to the history of Asia Minor. By reconquering much of the region, the Komnenoi set back the advance of the Turks in Anatolia by more than two centuries. In the process, they planted the foundations of the Byzantine successor states of Nicaea, Epirus and Trebizond. Meanwhile, their extensive programme of fortifications has left an enduring mark upon the Anatolian landscape, which can still be appreciated today.

== Crisis and fragmentation ==
The Komnenian era was born out of a period of great difficulty and strife for the Byzantine Empire. Following a period of relative success and expansion under the Macedonian dynasty (c. 867–c. 1056), Byzantium experienced several decades of stagnation and decline, which culminated in a vast deterioration in the military, territorial, economic and political situation of the Byzantine Empire by the accession of Alexios I Komnenos in 1081.

The problems the empire faced were partially caused by the growing influence and power of the aristocracy, which weakened the empire's military structure by undermining the theme system that trained and administered its armies. Beginning with the death of the successful soldier-emperor Basil II in 1025, a long series of weak rulers had disbanded the large armies which had been defending the eastern provinces from attack; instead, gold was stockpiled in Constantinople, ostensibly in order to hire mercenaries should troubles arise. In fact, most of the money was given away in the form of gifts to favourites of the emperor, extravagant court banquets, and luxuries for the imperial family.

Meanwhile, the remnants of the once-formidable armed forces were allowed to decay, to the point where they were no longer capable of functioning as an army. Elderly men with ill-maintained equipment mixed with new recruits who had never participated in a training exercise.

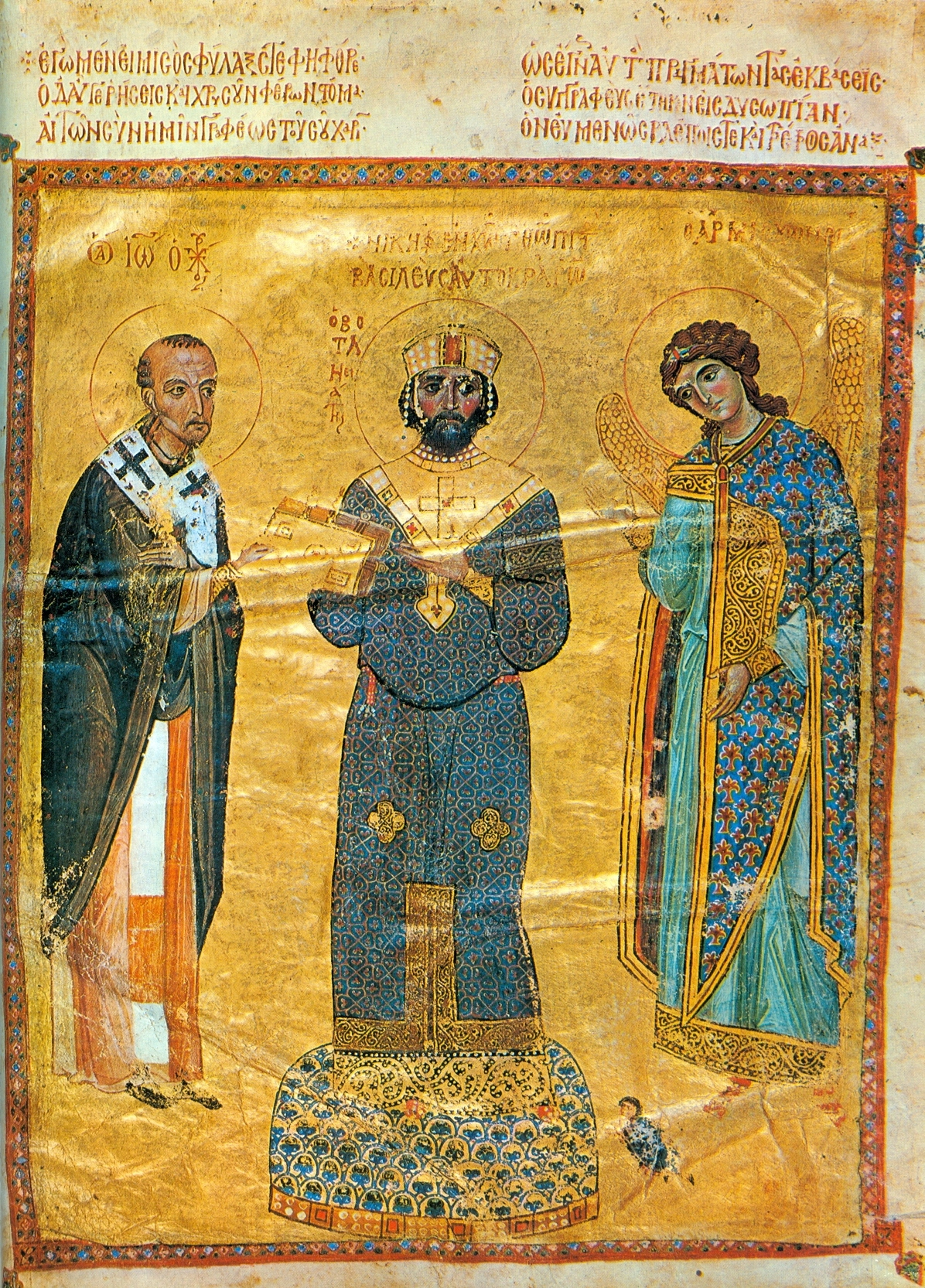
Nikephoros III Botaneiates (r. 1078–1081)

The simultaneous arrival of aggressive new enemies – Turks in the east and Normans in the west – was another contributory factor. In 1040, the Normans, originally landless mercenaries from northern parts of Europe in search of plunder, began attacking Byzantine strongholds in southern Italy. In order to deal with them, a mixed force of mercenaries and conscripts under the formidable George Maniakes was sent to Italy in 1042. Maniakes and his army conducted a brutally successful campaign, but before it could be concluded he was recalled to Constantinople. Angered by a series of outrages against his wife and property by one of his rivals, he was proclaimed emperor by his troops, and led them across the Adriatic to victory against a loyalist army. However, a mortal wound led to his death shortly afterwards. With opposition thus absent in the Balkans, the Normans were able to complete the expulsion of the Byzantines from Italy by 1071.

Despite the seriousness of this loss, it was in Asia Minor that the empire's greatest disaster would take place. The Seljuk Turks, although mainly concerned with defeating the Fatimids of Egypt, nevertheless conducted a series of damaging raids into Armenia and eastern Anatolia – the main recruiting ground for Byzantine armies. With imperial armies weakened by years of insufficient funding and civil warfare, Emperor Romanos Diogenes realised that a time of re-structuring and re-equipment was necessary. Consequently, he attempted to lead a defensive campaign in the east until his forces had recovered enough to defeat the Seljuks. However, he suffered a surprise defeat at the hands of Alp Arslan (Sultan of the Seljuk Turks) at the Battle of Manzikert in 1071. Romanos was captured, and although the Sultan's peace terms were fairly lenient, the battle in the long term resulted in the total loss of Byzantine Anatolia.

On his release, Romanos found that his enemies had conspired against him to place their own candidate on the throne in his absence. After two defeats in battle against the rebels, Romanos surrendered and suffered a horrific death by torture. The new ruler, Michael Doukas, refused to honour the treaty that had been signed by Romanos. In response, the Turks began to move into Anatolia in 1073; the collapse of the old defensive system meant that they met no opposition. To make matters worse, chaos reigned as the empire's remaining resources were squandered in a series of disastrous civil wars. Thousands of Turkoman tribesmen crossed the unguarded frontier and moved into Anatolia. By 1080, an area of 30,000 square miles (78,000 km^{2}) had been lost to the empire.

== Alexios I Komnenos ==
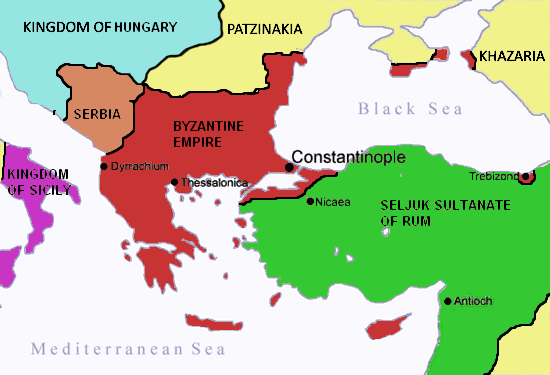
The Byzantine Empire at the accession of Alexios I Komnenos, c. 1081.

After Manzikert, a partial recovery was made possible due to the efforts of the Komnenian dynasty. This is sometimes referred to as the Komnenian restoration. The first emperor of this royal line was Alexios I Komnenos (whose life and policies would be described by his daughter Anna Komnene in the Alexiad). Alexios's long reign of nearly 37 years was full of struggle. At his accession in 1081, the Byzantine Empire was in chaos after a prolonged period of civil war resulting from the defeat at Manzikert.

At the very outset of his reign, Alexios had to meet the formidable threat of the Normans under Robert Guiscard and his son Bohemond of Taranto, who took Dyrrhachium and Corfu, and laid siege to Larissa in Thessaly (see Battle of Dyrrhachium). Alexios led his forces in person against the Normans, yet despite his best efforts his army was destroyed in the field. Alexios himself was wounded, but the death of Robert Guiscard in 1085 led to the Norman danger receding for a time.

However, Alexios's problems were only just beginning. At a time when the Emperor urgently needed to raise as much revenue as possible from his shattered empire, taxation and the economy were in complete disarray. Inflation was spiralling out of control, the coinage was heavily debased, the fiscal system was confused (there were six different nomismata in circulation), and the imperial treasury was empty. In desperation, Alexios had been forced to finance his campaign against the Normans by using the wealth of the Eastern Orthodox Church, which had been put at his disposal by the Patriarch of Constantinople.

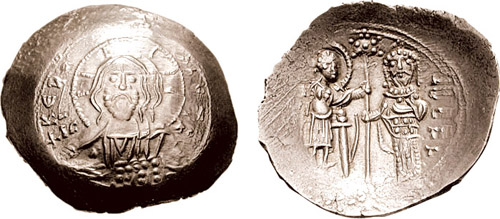
This electrum histamenon was struck by Alexios during his war against Robert Guiscard. The catastrophic financial situation of the Empire after 1071 had led to large-scale debasement of its coinage.

In 1087, Alexios faced a new invasion. This time the invaders consisted of a horde of 80,000 Pechenegs from north of the Danube, and they were heading for Constantinople. Without enough troops to repel this new threat, Alexios used diplomacy to achieve a victory against the odds. Having bribed the Cumans, another barbarian tribe, to come to his aid, he advanced against the Pechenegs, who were caught by surprise and annihilated at the Battle of Levounion on 28 April 1091.

With stability at last achieved in the west, Alexios now had a chance to begin solving his severe economic difficulties and the disintegration of the empire's traditional defences. In order to reestablish the army, Alexios began to build a new force on the basis of feudal grants (próniai) and prepared to advance against the Seljuks, who had conquered Asia Minor and were now established at Nicaea.

Despite his improvements, Alexios did not have enough manpower to recover the lost territories in Asia Minor. Having been impressed by the abilities of the Norman cavalry at Dyrrhachium, he sent ambassadors west to ask for reinforcements from Europe. This mission was deftly accomplished – at the Council of Piacenza in 1095, Pope Urban II was impressed by Alexios's appeal for help, which spoke of the suffering of the Christians of the east and hinted at a possible union of the eastern and western churches. Pope Urban was concerned with increasing restlessness of the martial nobility in Western Europe, who, currently deprived of major enemies, were causing chaos throughout the countryside. Alexios's appeal offered a means not only to redirect the energy of the knights to benefit the Church, but also to consolidate the authority of the Pope over all Christendom and to gain the east for the See of Rome.

=== First Crusade ===
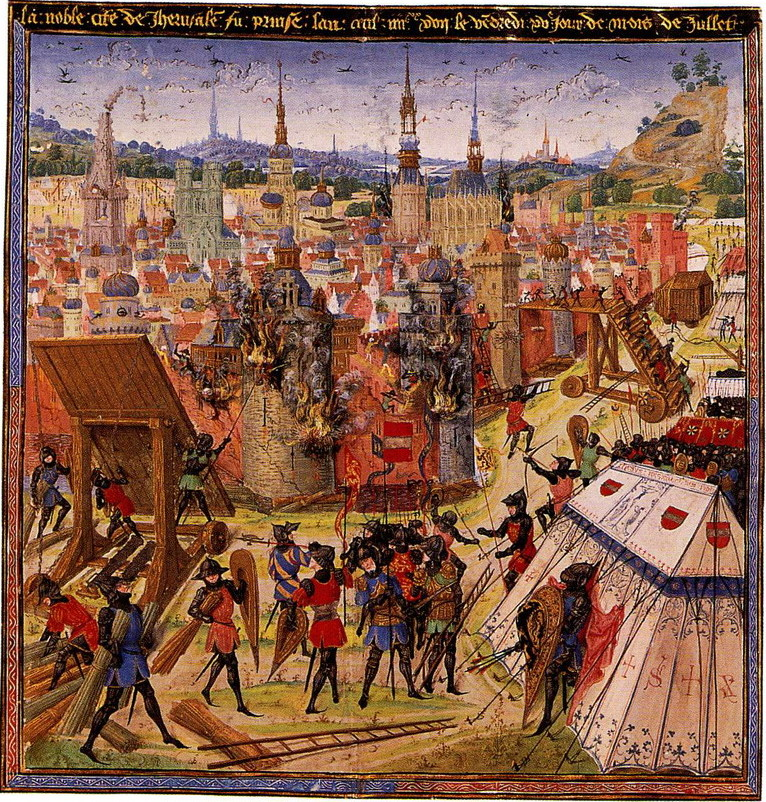
Medieval manuscript depicting the Capture of Jerusalem during the First Crusade.

On 27 November 1095, Urban II called together the Council of Clermont in France. There, amid a crowd of thousands who had come to hear his words, he urged all present to take up arms under the banner of the Cross and launch a holy war to recover Jerusalem and the east from the 'infidel' Muslims. Indulgences were to be granted to all those who took part in the great enterprise. Many promised to carry out the Pope's command, and word of the Crusade soon spread across western Europe.

Alexios had anticipated help in the form of mercenary forces from the West, and was totally unprepared for the immense and undisciplined hosts which soon arrived, to his consternation and embarrassment. The first group, under Peter the Hermit, he sent to Asia Minor, ordering them to stay close to the coast and await reinforcements. However, the unruly crusaders refused to listen and began looting and pillaging the local Christian inhabitants. As they marched on Nicaea in 1096, they were caught by the Turks and massacred almost to the man.

The second, "official" host of knights, led by Godfrey of Bouillon, Alexios also sent into Asia, promising to supply them with provisions in return for an oath of loyalty. They were accompanied by the Byzantine general Tatikios. By their victories, Alexios was able to recover for the Byzantine Empire a number of important cities and islands: Nicaea, Chios, Rhodes, Smyrna, Ephesus, Philadelphia, Sardis, and in fact much of western Asia Minor (1097–1099). This is ascribed by his daughter Anna to his policy and diplomacy, but good relations were not to last. The crusaders believed their oaths were made invalid when Alexios did not help them during the siege of Antioch (he had in fact set out on the road to Antioch, but had been persuaded to turn back by Stephen of Blois, who assured him that all was lost and that the expedition had already failed). Bohemund, who had set himself up as Prince of Antioch, briefly went to war with Alexios, but agreed to become Alexios's vassal under the Treaty of Devol in 1108.

=== Recovery ===
Despite his many successes, during the last twenty years of his life Alexios lost much of his popularity. This was largely due to the harsh measures he was forced to take in order to save the embattled empire. Conscription was introduced, causing resentment among the peasantry, despite the pressing need for new recruits to the imperial army. In order to restore the imperial treasury, Alexios took measures to tax the aristocracy heavily; he also cancelled many of the exemptions from taxation that the church had previously enjoyed. In order to ensure that all taxes were paid in full, and to halt the cycle of debasement and inflation, he completely reformed the coinage, issuing a new gold hyperpyron (highly refined) coin for the purpose. By 1109, he had managed to restore order by working out a proper rate of exchange for the whole coinage. His new hyperpyron would be the standard Byzantine coin for the next two hundred years.

Alexios delegated his son, John, as his heir whereas his wife Irene threw her full influence on the side of Anna. The final years of Alexios's reign were marked by persecution of the followers of the Paulician and Bogomil heresies—one of his last acts was to burn at the stake the Bogomil leader, Basil the Physician, with whom he had engaged in a theological controversy; by renewed struggles with the Turks (1110–1117); and by anxieties as to the succession, which his wife Irene wished to alter in favour of her daughter Anna's husband Nikephorus Bryennios, for whose benefit the special title panhypersebastos ("honored above all") was created; Alexios, who struggled with rheumatism, got to the point where he could not manage the empire and therefore delegated the responsibilities to his wife who in turn directed all affairs to Anna's husband instead of John. This intrigue disturbed even his dying hours.

Nevertheless, despite the unpopularity of some of his measures, Alexios's efforts had been vital to the survival of the empire. Financially and militarily bankrupt, and facing wave after wave of foreign invasion, the empire he inherited had been on the point of collapse. His long struggle to protect and restore the strength of the empire had been exhausting, but Alexios's successors inherited a viable state with both the internal stability and the military restoration but also a lot of financial resources, to expand in the future.

== Restoration under John II Komnenos ==
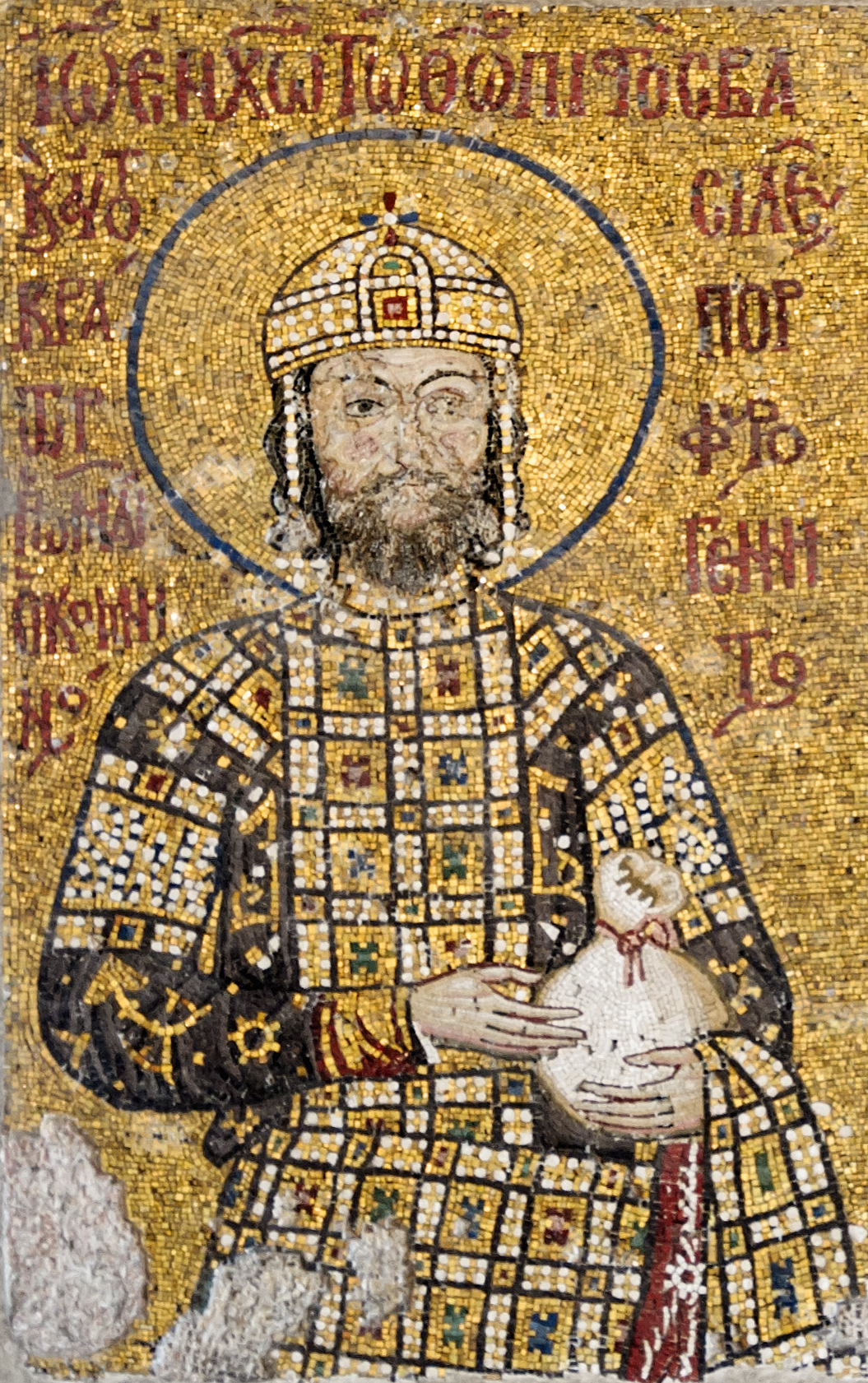
Emperor John II Komnenos. During his reign (1118–1143) he earned near universal respect, even from the Crusaders, for his courage, dedication and piety.

Alexios's son John II Komnenos succeeded him in 1118, and was to rule until 1143. On account of his mild and just reign, he has been called the Byzantine Marcus Aurelius. John was unusual for his lack of cruelty—despite his long reign, he never had anyone killed or blinded. He was loved by his subjects, who gave him the name 'John the Good'. He was also an energetic campaigner, spending much of his life in army camps and personally supervising sieges.

During John's reign, Byzantium faced many difficulties: enemies confronted the empire on all sides. An invasion of nomadic horsemen from the north threatened Byzantine control in the Balkans, and the Turks were harassing Byzantine territory in Asia Minor. However, John soon proved himself just as determined and energetic as his predecessor. At the Battle of Beroia, John personally led the imperial armies against the Pecheneg invaders. With the aid of the emperor's elite troops, the Varangian Guard, the tribal horsemen were decisively crushed. The emperor's victory was so emphatic that the Pechenegs soon disappeared as an independent people.

John's marriage to the Hungarian princess Piroska involved him in the dynastic struggles of the Kingdom of Hungary. In giving asylum to Álmos, a blinded claimant to the Hungarian throne, John aroused the suspicion of the Hungarians. The Hungarians, led by Stephen II, then invaded Byzantium's Balkan provinces in 1127, with hostilities lasting until 1129 The Hungarians attacked Belgrade, Nish and Sofia; John, who was near Philippopolis in Thrace, counterattacked, supported by a naval flotilla operating on the Danube. After a challenging campaign, the details of which are obscure, the emperor managed to defeat the Hungarians and their Serbian allies at the fortress of Haram or Chramon, which is the modern Nova Palanka. Following this the Hungarians renewed hostilities by attacking Braničevo, which was immediately rebuilt by John. Further Byzantine military successes, Choniates mentions several engagements, resulted in a restoration of peace. The Danube frontier had been definitively secured.

John was then able to concentrate on Asia Minor, which became the focus of his attention for most of his reign. The Turks were pressing forward against the Byzantine frontier, and John was determined to drive them back. Thanks to John's energetic campaigning, Turkish attempts at expansion in Asia Minor were halted, and John prepared to take the fight to the enemy. In order to restore the region to Byzantine control, John led a series of campaigns against the Turks, one of which resulted in the reconquest of the ancestral home of the Komneni at Kastamonu. He quickly earned a formidable reputation as a wall-breaker, taking stronghold after stronghold from his enemies. Regions which had been lost to the empire in the aftermath of Manzikert were recovered and garrisoned. Yet resistance, particularly from the Danishmends of the north-east, was strong, and the difficult nature of holding down the new conquests is illustrated by the fact that Kastamonu was recaptured by the Turks whilst John was back in Constantinople celebrating its return to Byzantine rule. John persevered, and Kastamonu soon changed hands once more. He advanced into north-eastern Anatolia, provoking the Turks to attack his army. Unlike Romanos Diogenes, John's forces were able to maintain their cohesion, and the Turkish attempt to inflict a second Manzikert on the emperor's army backfired when the Sultan, discredited by his failure, was murdered by his own people.

John, like Basil II before him, was a slow but steady campaigner. His armies made careful, measured gains over time, rarely exposing themselves to excessive risks, but nevertheless advancing inexorably towards their objectives. However, the Turks were resilient, and they did not allow themselves to be decisively defeated in any one engagement. They knew that it was difficult for the emperor to remain in one theatre of war for a long time, as events elsewhere often intervened that required his attention.

John consolidated his conquests and the existing Byzantine holdings in Asia by the building of a series of forts. Historian Paul Magdalino explains this process in his book The empire of Manuel Komnenos by placing it in the context of the Komnenian restoration of the Byzantine empire as a whole; he points out that while John's father Alexios had fortified places on the coast, John now expanded Byzantine control into the interior by fortifying places such as Lopadion, Achyraous and Laodicea, which guarded the approaches to the valleys and coastlands of Asia Minor. This restoration of order under John enabled agricultural prosperity to begin a recovery that would eventually restore these war torn regions to their former status as a productive and valuable part of the Byzantine empire.

Towards the end of his reign, John made a concerted effort to secure Antioch. On the way, he captured the southern coast of Asia Minor and Cilicia. He advanced into Syria at the head of his veteran army, which had been seasoned by a lifetime of campaigning. Although John fought hard for the Christian cause in the campaign in Syria, there was a famous incident where his allies, Prince Raymond of Antioch and Count Joscelin II of Edessa, sat around playing dice while John pressed the Siege of Shaizar. These Crusader Princes were suspicious of each other and of John, and neither wanted the other to gain from participating in the campaign, while Raymond also wanted to hold on to Antioch which he had agreed to hand over to John if the campaign was successful. Ultimately, Joscelin and Raymond conspired to keep John out of Antioch, and while he was preparing to lead a pilgrimage to Jerusalem and a further campaign, he accidentally grazed his hand on a poison arrow while out hunting. The poison set in and shortly afterwards he died.

Historian J. Birkenmeier has recently argued that John's reign was the most successful of the Komnenian period. In "The development of the Komnenian army 1081–1180", he stresses the wisdom of John's approach to warfare, which focused on siege warfare rather than risky pitched battles. Birkenmeier argues that John's strategy of launching annual campaigns with limited, realistic objectives was a more sensible one than that followed by his son Manuel I. According to this view, John's campaigns benefited the Byzantine Empire because they protected the empire's heartland from attack while gradually extending its territory in Asia Minor. The Turks were forced onto the defensive, while John kept his diplomatic situation relatively simple by allying with the Western Emperor against the Normans of Sicily.

Overall, John II Komnenos left the empire a great deal better off than he had found it. Substantial territories had been recovered, and his successes against the invading Petchenegs, Serbs and Seljuk Turks, along with his attempts to establish Byzantine suzerainty over the Crusader States in Antioch and Edessa, did much to restore the reputation of his empire. His careful, methodical approach to warfare had protected the empire from the risk of sudden defeats, while his determination and skill had allowed him to rack up a long list of successful sieges and assaults against enemy strongholds. By the time of his death, he had earned near universal respect, even from the Crusaders, for his courage, dedication and piety. His early death meant his work went unfinished; historian Zoe Oldenbourg speculates that his last campaign might well have resulted in real gains for Byzantium and the Christian cause.

== Manuel I Komnenos ==
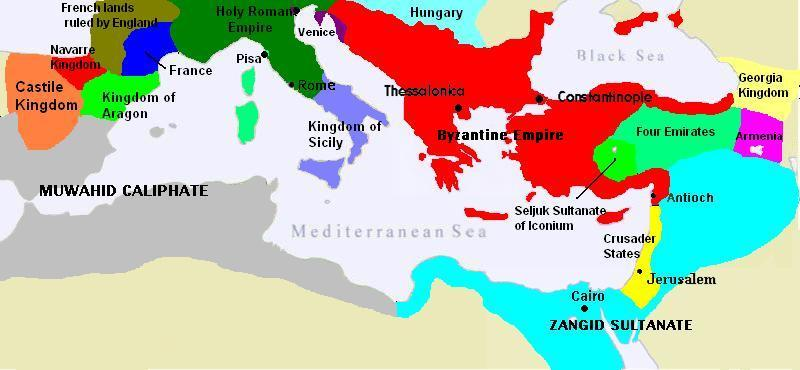
Map of the Byzantine Empire under Manuel Komnenos, c. 1170. By this time, the empire was once again the most powerful state in the Mediterranean, with client states stretching from Hungary to the Kingdom of Jerusalem, and a network of allies and diplomatic contacts stretching from Aragon, France, Germany, Pisa, Genoa and Rome in the west, to Antioch, Jerusalem, Konya and Damascus in the east.

John's chosen heir was his fourth son, Manuel I Komnenos. According to Niketas Choniates, a historian of Byzantium, Manuel was chosen over his elder surviving brother because of his ability to listen carefully to advice. Manuel was known for his lively and charismatic personality; he was known for his love for all things from Western Europe. Manuel arranged jousting matches, even participating in them, an unusual experience for the Byzantines. Manuel himself is generally considered the most brilliant of the four emperors of the Komnenos dynasty; unusual for a Byzantine ruler, his reputation was particularly good in the west and the Crusader states, especially after his death. The Latin historian William of Tyre described Manuel as "beloved of God... a great-souled man of incomparable energy", [whose] "memory will ever be held in benediction". Manuel was further extolled by Robert of Clari as a "generous and worthy man".

Manuel dedicated himself to restore the glory of his empire and to regaining superpower status. His foreign policy was both ambitious and expansive, reaching out to all corners of the Mediterranean world. He made several alliances with the Pope and Western Christian kingdoms, and successfully handled the passage of the potentially dangerous Second Crusade through his empire, establishing a Byzantine protectorate over the Crusader kingdoms of Outremer.

Manuel campaigned aggressively against his neighbours both in the west and in the east; facing Muslims in Palestine, he allied himself with the Crusader Kingdom of Jerusalem and sent a large fleet to participate in a combined invasion of Fatimid Egypt. In an effort to restore Byzantine control over the ports of southern Italy, he sent an expedition to invade Italy in 1155. Operating as part of a coalition of Byzantine, rebel, and Papal forces, Manuel's armies achieved initial success. However, disputes within the coalition led to the expedition's eventual failure. Despite this military setback Manuel was undeterred, and his armies successfully invaded the Kingdom of Hungary in 1167, defeating the Hungarians at the Battle of Sirmium. He was highly successful in the Balkans and Hungary; historian Paul Magdalino argues that no emperor had dominated the region so effectively since Late Antiquity.

In the east, however, Manuel's achievements are more ambiguous. He suffered a major defeat at the Battle of Myriokephalon in 1176 against the Turks. Manuel was marching against Konya, the Turkish capital, when his forces were ambushed; the ensuing defeat has since entered the popular imagination as a legendary disaster. Exaggerated accounts of the battle often describe the destruction of the entire Byzantine army, and with it the end of Byzantine power and influence. However, the modern consensus among Byzantine historians is that, while the Battle of Myriokephalon was a serious humiliation for the emperor, it was certainly not a catastrophe. Nor was it in any way equivalent to the Battle of Manzikert over a century earlier. In fact, much of the emperor's army emerged from the battle without serious damage. Units involved in the battle are well documented as campaigning in Asia Minor the following year. The imperial frontier remained unmoved for the remainder of Manuel's reign, a clear indication that the Turks were unable to gain any advantage from their victory. In 1177, the Byzantines inflicted a major defeat on a large Turkish force at Hyelion and Leimocheir in the Meander valley.

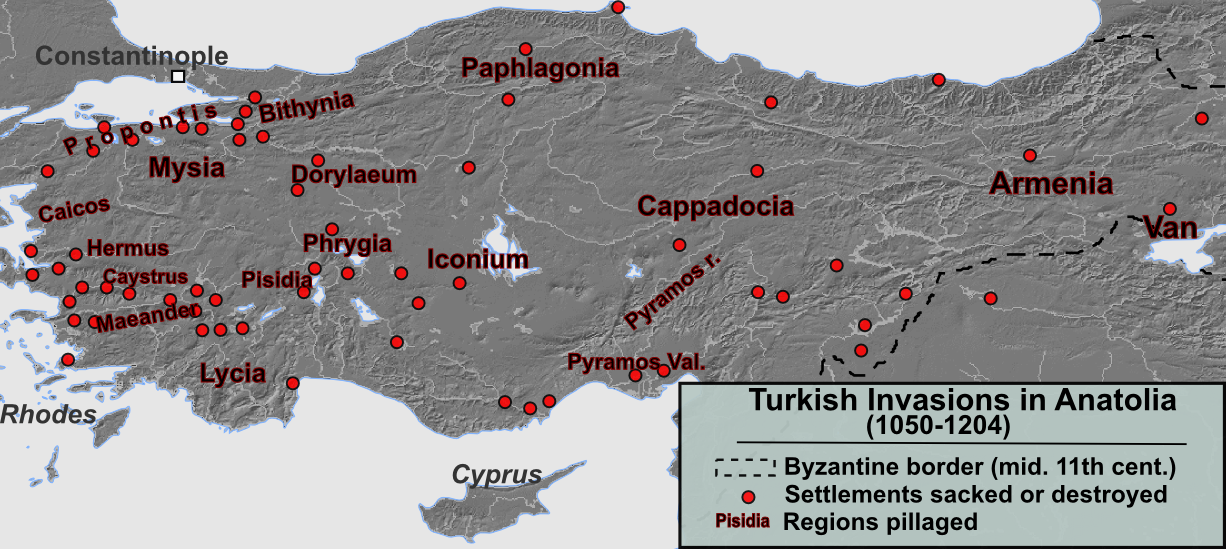
Settlements and regions affected during the first wave of Turkish invasions in Asia Minor (1050–1204).

Manuel's programme of fortification in Byzantine Asia, for which he was praised by Byzantine historian Niketas Choniates, is largely regarded as an important success. Manuel demanded tribute from the Turkmen of the Anatolian interior for the winter pasture in Imperial territory; he also improved the defenses of many cities and towns, and established new garrisons and fortresses across the region. As a result of the cumulative efforts of all three Komnenian emperors, Manuel's domination of Asia Minor was more effective than that of any emperor since before Manzikert. As historian Paul Magdalino makes clear, "by the end of Manuel's reign, the Byzantines controlled all the rich agricultural lowlands of the peninsula, leaving only the less hospitable mountain and plateau areas to the Turks."

In the religious sphere, disputes between the Roman Catholic Church and the Eastern Orthodox Church occasionally harmed efforts at cooperation with the Latins; however, Manuel was almost certainly the Byzantine emperor who came closest to healing the breach between the two churches. Pope Innocent III clearly had a positive view of Manuel when he told Alexios III that he should imitate "your outstanding predecessor of famous memory the emperor Manuel... in devotion to the Apostolic See, both in words and in works".

Manuel was very successful in expanding his influence, particularly over the Crusader states. As an example, he participated in the building and decorating of many of the basilicas and Greek monasteries in the Holy Land, including the Church of the Holy Sepulchre in Jerusalem where due to his efforts the Byzantine clergy were allowed to perform the Greek liturgy each day. All this reinforced his position as overlord of the Crusader states, with his hegemony over Antioch and Jerusalem secured by agreement with Raynald, Prince of Antioch, and Amalric, King of Jerusalem. This success in gaining influence and allies among the western states and the Pope is regarded one of the most impressive achievements of Manuel Komnenos's reign.

== Military reform ==
At the beginning of the Komnenian period in 1081, the Byzantine Empire had been reduced to the smallest territorial extent in its history. Surrounded by enemies, and financially ruined by a long period of civil war, the empire's prospects had looked grim. Yet, through a combination of determination, military reform, and years of campaigning, Alexios I Komnenos, John II Komnenos and Manuel I Komnenos managed to restore the power of the Byzantine Empire. An important factor in the success of the Komnenoi was their establishment of a reconstructed Byzantine army. The new military system which they created is known as the Komnenian army. From c. 1081 to c. 1180, the Komnenian army played an important role in providing the empire with a period of security that enabled Byzantine civilization to flourish.

The new force was both professional and disciplined. It contained formidable guards units such as the Varangian Guard, the 'Immortals' (a unit of heavy cavalry) stationed in Constantinople and the Archontopouloi, recruited by Alexios from the sons of dead Byzantine officers, and also levies from the provinces. These levies included Kataphraktoi cavalry from Macedonia, Thessaly and Thrace, and various other provincial forces such as Trebizond Archers from the Black Sea coast of Asia Minor and the Vardariots, a cavalry unit recruited from Christianised Magyars from the Vardar valley. Alongside troops raised and paid for directly by the state, the Komnenian army included the armed followers of members of the wider imperial family and its extensive connections. In this can be seen the beginnings of the feudalisation of the Byzantine military. The granting of pronoia holdings, where land was held in return for military obligations, was beginning to become a notable element in the military infrastructure towards the end of the Komnenian period, though it became much more important subsequently. In 1097, the Byzantine Army numbered around 70,000 men altogether. By the closing years of the 1180-era, and the death of Manuel Komnenos, whose frequent campaigns had been on a grand scale the army was probably considerably larger. During the reign of Alexius I, the field army numbered around 20,000 men which was increased to about 30,000 men in John II's reign. By the end of Manuel I's reign the Byzantine field army had risen to 40,000 men.

Under John II, a Macedonian division was maintained, and new native Byzantine troops were recruited from the provinces. As Byzantine Asia Minor began to prosper under John and Manuel, more soldiers were raised from the Asiatic provinces of Neokastra, Paphlagonia and even Seleucia (in the south east). Soldiers were also drawn from defeated peoples, such as the Pechenegs (cavalry archers), and the Serbs, who were used as settlers stationed at Nicomedia. Native troops were organised into regular units and stationed in both the Asian and European provinces. Komnenian armies were also often reinforced by allied contingents from Antioch, Serbia and Hungary, yet even so they generally consisted of about two-thirds Byzantine troops to one-third foreigners. Units of archers, infantry and cavalry were grouped together so as to provide combined arms support to each other. The emperor Manuel I was heavily influenced by Westerners (both of his queens were 'Franks') and at the beginning of his reign he re-equipped and retrained his native Byzantine heavy cavalry along Western lines. It is inferred that Manuel introduced the couched lance technique, the close order charge and increased the use of heavier armour. Manuel personally took part in 'knightly' tournaments in the Western fashion, where his considerable prowess impressed Western observers. Permanent military camps were established in the Balkans and in Anatolia, these are first described during the reign of John II. The main Anatolian camp was near Lopadion on the Rhyndakos River near the Sea of Marmora, the European equivalent was at Kypsella in Thrace, others were at Sofia (Serdica) and at Pelagonia, west of Thessalonica. These great military camps seem to have been an innovation of the Komnenian emperors and may have played an important part in the improvement in the effectiveness of the Byzantine forces seen in the period. The camps were used as transit stations for the movement of troops, as concentration points for field armies, for the training of troops and for the preparation of armies for the rigours of campaign.

== Twelfth century 'Renaissance' ==
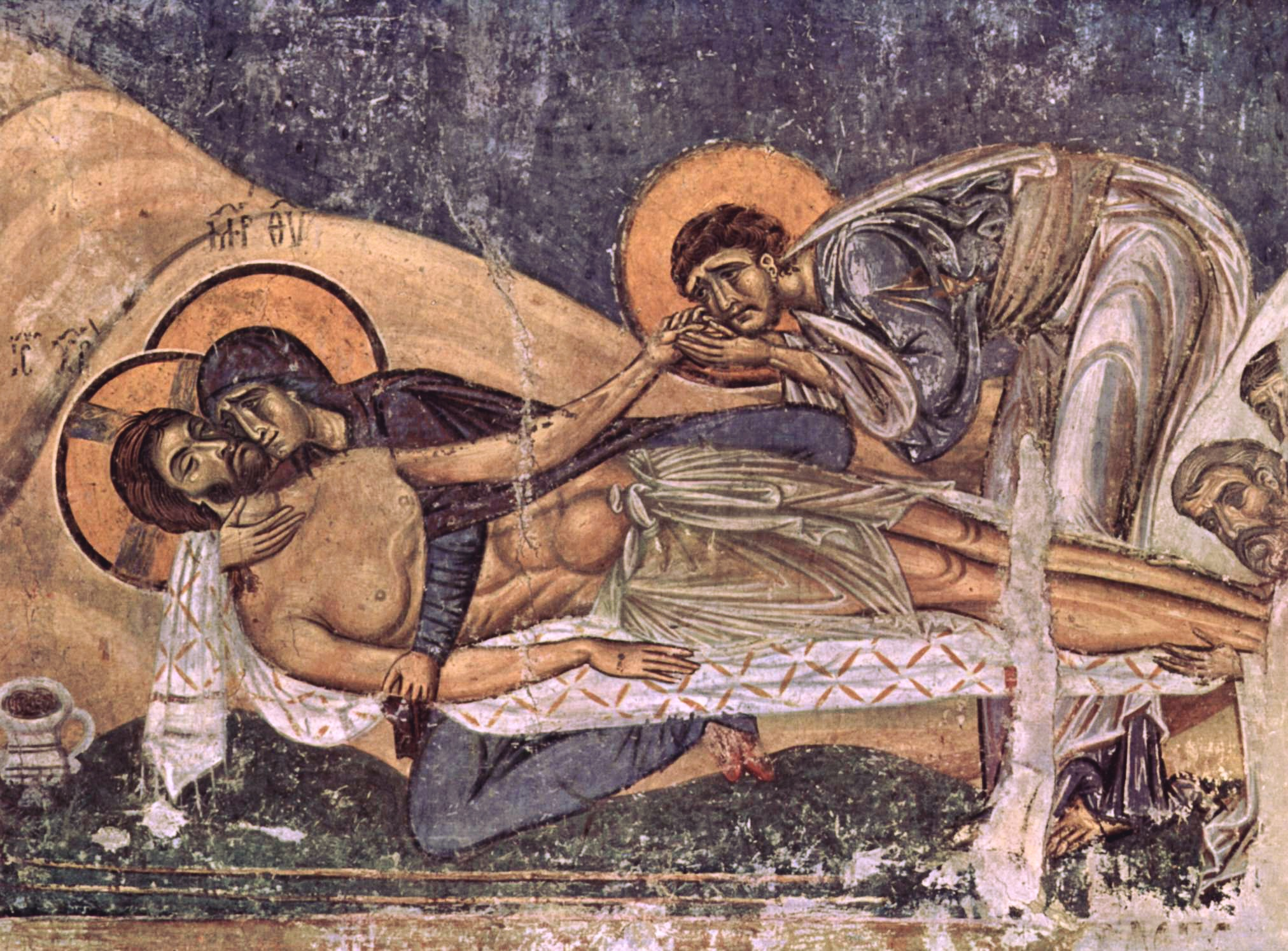
'The Lamentation of Christ' (1164), a fresco from the church of Saint Panteleimon in Nerezi near Skopje, in North Macedonia. It is considered a superb example of 12th century Komnenian art.

It has recently been argued that a '12th century renaissance' occurred in Byzantium. Although the term does not enjoy widespread usage, it is beyond doubt that 12th century Byzantium witnessed major cultural developments, which were largely underpinned by rapid economic expansion.

The 12th century was a time of significant growth in the Byzantine economy, with rising population levels and extensive tracts of new agricultural land being brought into production. Archaeological evidence from both Europe and Asia Minor shows a considerable increase in the size of urban settlements, together with a 'notable upsurge' in new towns. In Athens the medieval town experienced a period of rapid and sustained growth, starting in the eleventh century and continuing until the end of the twelfth century. Thessaloniki, the second city of the Empire, hosted a famous summer fair which attracted traders from across the Balkans and even further afield to its bustling market stalls. In Corinth, silk production fuelled a thriving economy. In Asia Minor, some areas had become depopulated due to Turkish raiding in the late eleventh century. Yet as the Komnenian emperors built up extensive fortifications in rural areas during the twelfth century, repopulation of the countryside took place.

Overall, given that both population and prosperity increased substantially in this period, economic recovery in Byzantium appears to have been strengthening the economic basis of the state. This helps to explain how the Komnenian emperors, Manuel Komnenos in particular, were able to project their power and influence so widely at this time.

The new wealth being generated during this period had a positive impact on Byzantine cultural life. In artistic terms, the twelfth century was a very productive period in Byzantine history. There was a revival in the mosaic art, and regional schools of Architecture began producing many distinctive styles that drew on a range of cultural influences.

According to N. H. Baynes in Byzantium, An Introduction to East Roman Civilization,

Such was the influence of Byzantine art in the twelfth century, that Russia, Venice, southern Italy and Sicily all virtually became provincial centres dedicated to its production.

== Andronikos I Komnenos and the fall of the Komnenoi ==
Manuel's death on 24 September 1180, marked a turning point in the fortunes of the Byzantine Empire. When Manuel died, he was succeeded by his young son Alexios II Komnenos, who was under the guardianship of the empress Maria. Her conduct excited popular indignation, and the consequent disorders, amounting almost to civil war, gave an opportunity to the ambition of Manuel's estranged cousin, Andronikos I Komnenos (r. 1183–1185), son of Isaac Komnenos. Andronikos left his retirement in 1182, and marched on Constantinople with an army that (according to non-Byzantine sources) included Muslim contingents. His arrival was soon followed by a massacre of the Latin inhabitants, which was focused on the Venetian merchants who were settled in some numbers in Constantinople. He was believed to have arranged the poisoning of Alexios II's elder sister Maria the Porphyrogenita and her husband Renier of Montferrat, although Maria herself had encouraged him to intervene. The poisoner was said to be the eunuch Pterygeonites. Soon afterwards he had the empress Maria imprisoned and then killed, by Pterygeonites and the hetaireiarches Constantine Tripsychos. Alexios II was compelled to acknowledge Andronikos as colleague in the empire, but was then put to death; the killing was carried out by Tripsychos, Theodore Dadibrenos and Stephen Hagiochristophorites. Andronikos, by 1183 sole emperor, married Agnes of France, a child twelve years of age who had been formerly betrothed to Alexios II. Agnes was a daughter of King Louis VII of France and his third wife Adèle of Champagne. By November 1183, Andronikos associated his younger legitimate son John Komnenos on the throne.

Andronikos Komnenos was known as a man of contrasting personalities. Contempory sources labled him as handsome and eloquent, the new emperor was at the same time known for his licentious exploits. He was said to be energetic and determined, but also capable of terrifying brutality, violence and cruelty.

Andronikos began his reign well; in particular, the measures he took to reform the government of the empire have been praised by historians. In the provinces, Andronikos' reforms produced a speedy and marked improvement. Andronikos's fierce determination to root out corruption and many other abuses was admirable; under Andronikos, the sale of offices ceased; selection was based on merit, rather than favouritism; officials were paid an adequate salary so as to reduce the temptation of bribery. Every form of corruption was eliminated with ferocious zeal.

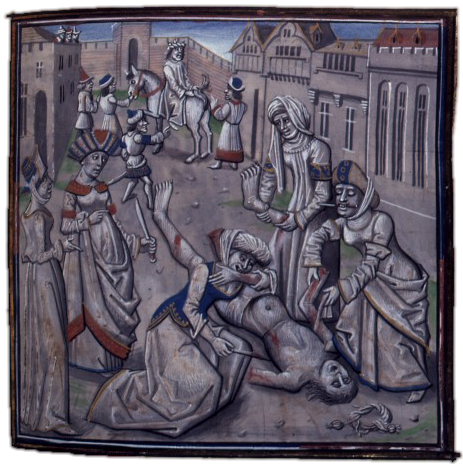
A medieval depiction of the death of Andronikos. Original in the Bibliothèque Nationale, France.

The people, who felt the severity of his laws, at the same time acknowledged their justice, and found themselves protected from the rapacity of their superiors. Andronikos's energetic efforts to rein in the oppressive tax collectors and officials of the empire did much to alleviate the lot of the peasantry. However, his efforts to check the power of the nobility were considerably more problematic. The aristocrats were infuriated with him, and to make matters worse, Andronikos seems to have become increasingly deranged; executions and violence became increasingly common, and his reign turned into a reign of terror. Andronikos seemed almost to seek the extermination of the aristocracy as a whole. The struggle against the aristocracy turned into wholesale slaughter, as the emperor resorted to ever more ruthless measures to shore up his regime.

There were several revolts, leading to an invasion by King William II of Sicily. On September 11, 1185, during his absence from the capital, Stephen Hagiochristophorites moved to arrest Isaac Angelos, whose loyalty was suspect. Isaac killed Hagiochristophorites and took refuge in the church of Hagia Sophia. He appealed to the populace, and a tumult arose which spread rapidly over the whole city.

When Andronikos arrived, he found that his authority was overthrown: Isaac had been proclaimed emperor. The deposed Emperor attempted to escape in a boat with his wife Agnes and his mistress, but was captured. Isaac handed him over to the city mob and for three days he was exposed to their fury and resentment. His right hand was cut off, his teeth and hair were pulled out, one of his eyes was gouged out, and, among many other sufferings, boiling water was thrown in his face. At last, led to the Hippodrome of Constantinople, he was hung up by the feet between two pillars, and two Latin soldiers competed as to whose sword would penetrate his body more deeply. He died on September 12, 1185. At the news of the emperor's death, his son and co-emperor, John, was murdered by his own troops in Thrace.

Andronikos I was the last of the Komnenoi to rule Constantinople, although his grandsons Alexios and David founded the Empire of Trebizond in 1204. Nevertheless, Andronikos's role in the collapse of the empire is controversial; historians disagree over the extent to which his brief reign influenced events after his death. Andonikos's coup, together with his violent death, had weakened the dynastic continuity and solidarity on which the strength of the Byzantine state had come to rely. Furthermore, his so-called 'anti-Latin' policy has been criticised by some historians as a failure, in view of the increasing hostility it caused towards Byzantium in the west. In particular, Andonikos's failure to prevent the massacre of Latins in Constantinople in 1182 has been seen as especially significant, since henceforth Byzantine foreign policy was invariably perceived as sinister and anti-Latin in the west. It has even been argued that Andronikos's attempts to crush the aristocracy were damaging to the empire's military power, since the aristocracy had become indispensable to the defences of the state. On the other hand, his reforms in the provinces were both wise and beneficial to the internal health and prosperity of the empire.

With the death of Andronikos, the Komnenian dynasty, having lasted 104 years, had finally come to an end. The Komnenian period was followed by the dynasty of the Angeloi, who oversaw perhaps the most crucial period in the Decline of the Byzantine Empire. The next quarter of a century would see Constantinople fall to an invading force for the first time in its history, and the final loss of the empire's 'great power' status.

== See also ==
- Byzantine Empire under the Angelos dynasty
- Komnenos dynasty and related family tree
- Family trees of the Byzantine imperial dynasties
- Byzantine army (Komnenian era)
- Renaissance of the 12th century
- Komnenian restoration
- Byzantine civilisation in the 12th century
- List of Trapezuntine emperors
- Empire of Trebizond

== Bibliography ==
- Angold, Michael (1984). The Byzantine Empire, 1025–1204: A Political History (First ed.). London and New York: Longman. ISBN 0-582-49060-X.
- J. Birkenmeier, The Development of the Komnenian Army, 1081–1180
- F. Chalandon, Les Comnènes Vol. I and II, Paris (1912; reprinted 1960 (in French)
- Anna Comnena, The Alexiad, trans. E. R. A Sewter, Penguin Classics (1969).
- Choniates, Niketas (1984). O City of Byzantium: Annals of Niketas Choniates. transl. by H. Magoulias. Detroit. ISBN 0-8143-1764-2.
- John Haldon, The Byzantine Wars. Stroud: The History Press, 2008. ISBN 978-0752445656.
- John Haldon, Byzantium at War: AD 600–1453. Oxford: Osprey Publishing, 2002. ISBN 978-1841763606.
- John Kinnamos, The Deeds of John and Manuel Comnenus, trans. Charles M. Brand. Columbia University Press New York (1976).
- Angus Konstam, Historical Atlas of the Crusades
- Magdalino, Paul (2002) [1993]. The Empire of Manuel I Komnenos, 1143–1180 (Second ed.). Cambridge: Cambridge University Press. ISBN 9780521526531.
- George Ostrogorsky, History of the Byzantine State, New Brunswick: Rutgers University Press, 1969. ISBN 978-0813511986.
