= Corriere delle dame =

Italian fashion and women's magazine (1804–1875)

- Categories: Fashion magazine; Women's magazine
- Frequency: Weekly
- Founder: Carolina Arienti
- Founded: 1804
- Final issue: July 1875
- Country: Italy
- Based in: Milan
- Language: Italian

Corriere delle dame was a weekly Italian language fashion magazine published in Milan, Italy, between 1804 and July 1875. The magazine is one of the pioneers in women's emancipation in Italy.

== History and profile ==
Corriere delle dame was established in 1804. The founder was Carolina Arienti (also known as Carolina Lattanzi), who was married to Giuseppe Lattanzi. She edited the magazine, which included articles about literature and theatre of France and Italy. It targeted men, women and children. However, it was mostly read by women from higher social classes. The magazine is the origin of the Lombard costume.

The magazine was published on a weekly basis. The headquarters of Corriere delle dame was in Milan. In 1811 the number of subscribers was 700. The magazine existed until July 1875.
