= Isaac I =

Isaac I may refer to:

- Isaac I Komnenos, Byzantine emperor (1057–1059)
- Isaac I of Antioch (r. 755–756), Syriac Orthodox patriarch
- Isaac I of Optina (1810–1894), superior of Optina Monastery

== See also ==
- Isaac II
