= Carolina Arienti Lattanzi =

Italian writer and feminist (1771–1818)

- Born: 1771; Tuscany
- Died: 1818 (aged 46–47)
- Occupations: journalist, poet, writer
- Spouse: Giuseppe Lattanzi (married 1797-1818)

Carolina Arienti Lattanzi (1771–1818) was a writer, journalist, poet, and early figure in the Italian feminist movement. She delivered a famous lecture, "The Slavery of Women," calling for more rights for women and drawing attention to the societal and legal obstacles that kept women from achieving gender equality. In 1804, with her husband, Giuseppe Lattanzi, she founded Corriere delle dame, one of the first Italian periodicals targeted to a female audience, which covered women's fashion, as well as current events.

== Biography ==
Carolina Arienti was born in Tuscany, to a middle-class family. In 1788, she married writer and politician Giuseppe Lattanzi, and they moved to Mantua. In May 1797, Lattanzi was admitted to the Academy of Public Education in Mantua as a member without voting rights. In July 1797, Lattanzi delivered a lecture at the Academy called "Della schiavitù delle donne" (The Slavery of Women), which was later published as a pamphlet dedicated to Josephine Beauharnais, who was married to Napoleon Bonaparte. In her lecture, Lattanzi called for more rights for women and denounced the "triple slavery" of women: fathers force daughters into arranged marriage or convents; husbands are often authoritarian and cruel; and "despots" deny women the rights of divorce and inheritance, as well as access to education and public office. Lattanzi declared that women could take on equal roles as men in society, but this was not possible because of their lack of education. She also directed much of her speech to women, encouraging them to act on their own behalf.

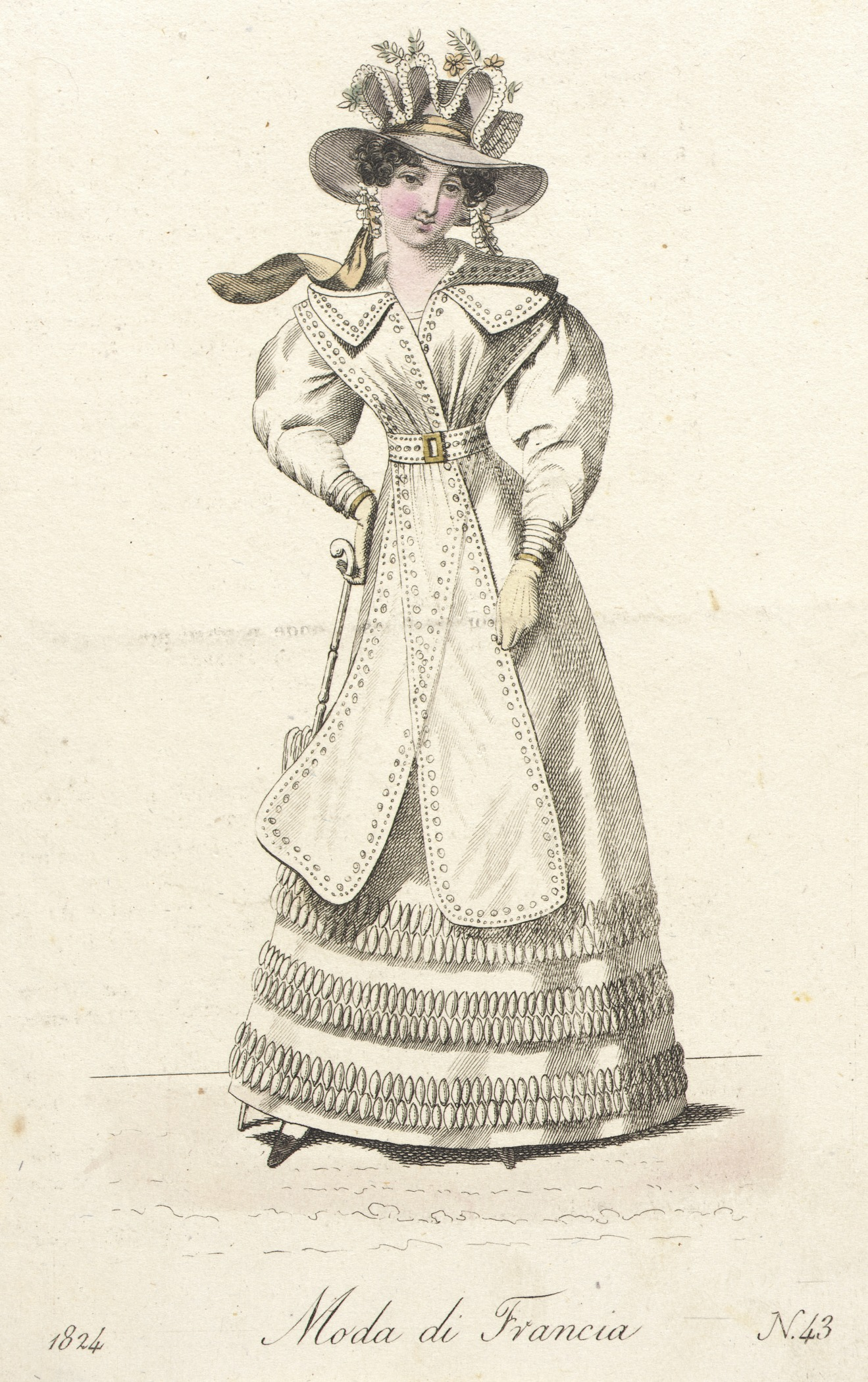
Fashion plate from Corriere delle Dame, circa 1824 (Los Angeles County Museum of Art)

In 1804, in Milan, the Lattanzis co-founded Corriere delle Dame (Ladies' Courier), one of the first Italian periodicals targeted to a female audience, which covered women's fashion, literature, current events, practical advice, and theatrical reviews. It was among the first periodicals that included illustrations of fashions. Lattanzi chose to launch the periodical in the year before Bonaparte would be crowned King of Italy, anticipating the balls that would take place, at which Milanese high society would want to be dressed fashionably. With this publicity and advertisements that targeted Napoleon's Milanese court, Lattanzi had about 700 subscribers by 1811. In addition to its fashion-oriented content, Corriere delle Dame published a supplement called "Termometro Politico" (Political Thermometer), which covered political issues. It also published musical scores, such as the cavatina for guitar by Nicola Moretti, and pamphlets, such as l’Elogio storico della Contessa Paolina Secco-Suardo-Grismondi tra le Pastorelle d’Arcadia Lesbia Cidonia. After Lattanzi's death in 1818, the editorship passed to another woman, Giuditta Lampugnani. It continued to be published until 1875.

In addition to her writings for the Corriere, three of Lattanzi's canticles were published in the 1810 anthology Omaggio poetico di vari autori per l'Imeneo di Napoleone con Maria Luigia d'Austria (Poetic Homage by Various Authors for the Marriage of Napoleon and Mary Louise of Austria). In 1815, shortly before she fell ill, Lattanzi published some of her poetry in Diario poetico (Poetic Diary), which was sent to all the Corriere's subscribers.
