= Byzantine–Pecheneg War (1046–1047) =

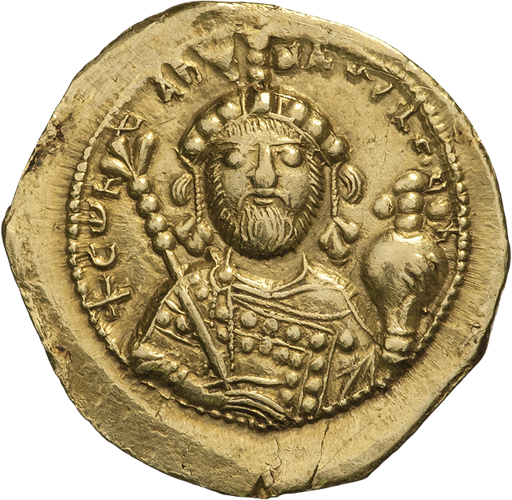
- Gold tetarteron coin with a bust of Constantine IX Monomachos
Date	15 December 1046 – Late January 1047
Location	Thrace, Macedonia, Paristrion and Bulgaria, Byzantine Empire
Result	Byzantine victory

Belligerents
Byzantine Empire	Pechenegs

Commanders and leaders
Constantine IX Monomachos; Kegen; Constantine Arianites; Michael; Basil	Tyrach

Strength
Fewer than the Pechenegs	80,000 warriors

Casualties and losses
Unknown	Very heavy Up to 100,000 (including non-combatants) captured

The Byzantine–Pecheneg War was a conflict fought between the Byzantine Empire and migrating Pechenegs in 1046-1047. After sustaining heavy losses and several defeats, as well as a plague that struck their armies, the Pechenegs were forced to surrender and settle under terms set by the Emperor Constantine IX Monomachos.

== Background ==
The historian John Skylitzes records that shortly after the Rus'-Byzantine War of 1043, the Byzantines became aware of the movement of a large host of Pechenegs towards the Danube, and of strife between two factions amongst them, one led by Tyrach and the other led by Kegen. Kegen had gained distinction in a war the Pechenegs had fought against another nomadic people, the Uzes, and sought to use this reputation to challenge and overthrow Tyrach. However, Kegen was defeated by Tyrach when the two fought a battle, with the former forced to go into exile.

Kegen was forced to flee with his remaining followers to Byzantine territory. At Dristra, he was received by the local commander Michael, who informed Emperor Constantine of his arrival, and arranged a baptism for the Pecheneg warlord. After his conversion to Christianity, Kegen received citizenship as a patrikios, and was appointed commander of Byzantine units and three fortresses along the Danube frontier, while what was left of the two renegade Pecheneg tribes that had fled with him, were permitted to settle within Imperial borders.

From his newfound position as a Byzantine commander, Kegen began to launch raids across the frozen Danube against his rival Tyrach, and the Pechenegs under him. Tyrach responded to this affront by appealing to Constantine to halt the incursions by Byzantine forces, but the Emperor made no effort to reign in Kegen. Consequently, Tyrach attacked the Empire, crossing the frozen Danube with his people into Paristrion. Tyrach had around 80,000 warriors and a larger number of non-combatants with him, among the 11 tribes under his command. With such a large force behind him, Tyrach dispatched bands of Pechenegs to raid and pillage the surrounding Imperial territory.

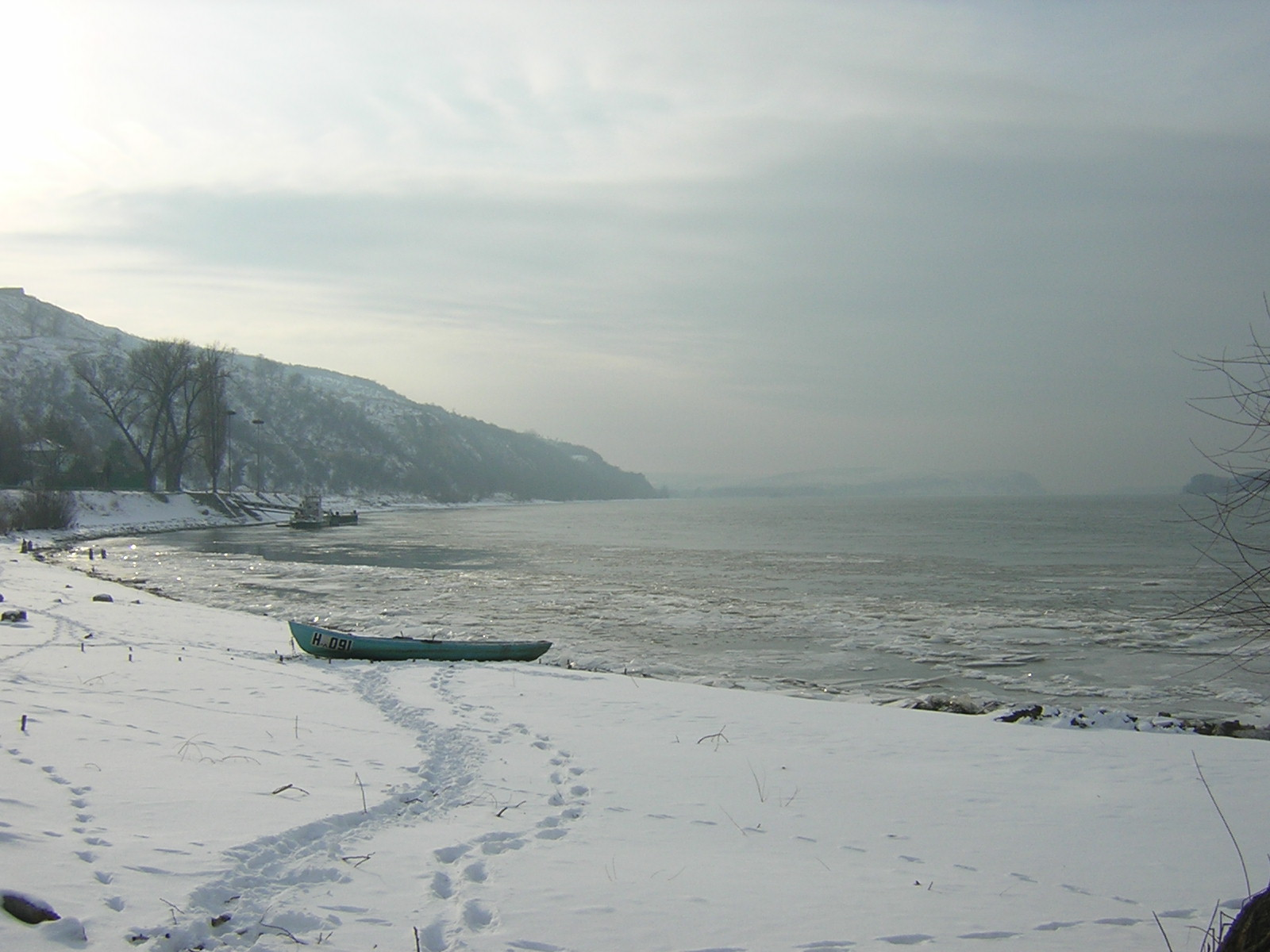
Modern view of the Danube in winter at Nikopol, Bulgaria. This area formed part of the northern frontier of Byzantine Paristrion

== The War in winter ==
In response to Tyrach's invasion, Constantine Monomachos ordered that large numbers of troops be dispatched to oppose the incursion of the Pechenegs, placing them under the command of Kegen. This army consisted of men from Bulgaria led by a former monk named Basil, men from Paristrion, troops drawn from Thrace under Constantine Arianites, as well as auxiliaries in the form of remnants of Kegen's men. Kegen initially opted not to engage the massive army of his kinsmen in a direct confrontation, but rather engaged in minor battles and skirmishes against separate raiding columns of Pecheneg horsemen, while harassing the larger bodies of the nomadic force. The Byzantines were victorious in these engagements, dealing significant losses and degrading the enemy morale. Around that time, an outbreak of plague broke amongst the Pecheneg camps, further eroding their fighting ability. Having thus depleted the Pecheneg morale with this strategy, Kegen committed his army against them in pitched battle on January 13th 1047. In a full scale assault, the Byzantines defeated the already wavering army of the combined Pecheneg tribes, routing their cavalry and pursuing them to their camp. Lacking the will to endure a blockade of their camp, the nomads threw down their arms and surrendered.

After the victory over the Pechenegs, Kegen advised the Byzantine commanders to exterminate the captive nomads, the number of which may have reached or exceeded 100,000, including non-combatant women and children. (Note: Paroń (p.230) reasons that this was more likely a plea to execute the elites of the Pecheneg tribes, so that Kegen could assume leadership over the rest of the people.) However, the Byzantine commanders refused to enact this policy, as they considered such an extreme measure to be barbaric. Consequently, the defeated Pechenegs were dispersed and settled in small groups across the Balkans, on the condition that adult male members of their communities serve as foederati in the Byzantine army.

== Aftermath ==
In late 1048, the Emperor Constantine IX saw opportunity to dispatch a contingent of Pecheneg foederati to reinforce the eastern frontier, where Byzantium had engaged in warfare against large Seljuk armies. Due to their qualities as nomadic horsemen, the Pechenegs were considered useful in countering the similar fighting styles of the Turkomans. Consequently, in early 1049, a Pecheneg force of 15,000 men was dispatched East, but after reaching the Bosporus these men mutinied and turned back to Thrace. At Serdica, they were reinforced by other groups of Pechenegs who had settled in Byzantium, which resulted in a large full-scale revolt. After four years of conflict with heavy losses on both sides, this conflict was ended in negotiated settlement, largely returning to the status quo before the outbreak of the revolt.

== Bibliography ==
- Gilmer, James (2012). Lazarus Rising: Nikephoros Phokas and the Tenth Century Byzantine Military Rennaissance. Charles Town, West Virginia.
- Paroń, Aleksander (2021). The Pechenegs: Nomads in the Political and Cultural Landscape of Medieval Europe. Translated by Anessi, Thomas. Leiden, Boston: Brill. ISBN 978-90-04-44109-5.
- Stephenson, Paul (2008). Byzantium's Balkan Frontier: A Political Study of the Northern Balkans, 900-1204. Cambridge University Press. ISBN 978-0190253226.
- Wortley, John, ed. (2010). John Skylitzes: A Synopsis of Byzantine History, 811–1057. Cambridge: Cambridge University Press. ISBN 978-0-521-76705-7.
- Brunet de Presle, Wladimir; Bekker, Immanuel, eds. (1853). Corpus scriptorum historiae Byzantinae: Michaelis Attaliotae historia (in Ancient Greek and Latin). Weber.
