= Botaneiates =

Byzantine aristocratic family

Botaneiates Βοτανειάτης
- Noble family
- Country: Byzantine Empire
- Origin: Anatolic Theme, Asia Minor
- Founded: 9th century
- Founder: Andrew Botaneiates (first known)
- Titles: Strategos, Doux, Byzantine emperor
- Members: Theophylact Botaneiates, Nikephoros III Botaneiates
- Connected families: Doukas
- Dissolution: 12th century

The Botaneiates (Greek: Βοτανειάτης, (Note: Greek pronunciation: [votaˈɲa.tis]) pl. Botaneiatai, Greek: Βοτανειάται) or Botaniates was a Byzantine aristocratic family that produced several generals and one Byzantine Emperor during the 11th and 12th centuries. The earliest attestation of the name occurred in the 6th and 9th centuries and it originated from Asia Minor. The family remained obscure until the 11th century when the first prominent member, Theophylact Botaneiates, is mentioned holding the title of doux in Thessalonica. The family reached their heyday under Nikephoros III Botaneiates who held high military offices before ruling as Emperor between 1078 and 1081. During the Komnenian period, the Botaneiatai continued to hold important titles thanks to their ties with the Komnenos dynasty. The status of the family begun to decline from the late 12th century onwards.

== History ==
=== Origins and early history ===
The Botaneiates family is believed to have originated from the village of Botane (Greek: Βοτάνη, lit. 'pasture'), near Synnada, in the Anatolic Theme of Asia Minor. The surname was acquired from the name of the village, with the Greek suffix -ates indicating provenance. Sources from subsequent periods incidate that the family continued to maintain its ties with the region for several generations. The earliest attestation of the name Botaniates occurred in the 6th century and was associated with the village of Botane. The seal of a certain Andrew Botaneiates is dated to the 9th century, during which time the family is still little known. The Botaneiatai would not be mentioned again in the Byzantine sources until the 11th century, when the family begun to ascend. Some Botaneiatai are known to have lived under Basil II holding the titles of strategos. The first one, Theophylact Botaneiates, is mentioned by John Skylitzes as the doux of Thessalonica in 1014. He participated in the wars against Samuel of Bulgaria and was killed soon after the Battle of Kleidion. Theophylact's son, Michael, served in Thessalonica and participated in the operations against Bulgaria along his father. Theophylact is sometimes identified with "Nikephoros", also father of a Michael, and grandfather of the future emperor Nikephoros III, according to the genealogy of Michael Attaleiates. The accounts of Attaleiates held that Nikephoros III was associated with the prestigious Phokas clan. Although uncertain, this information was used to add legitimacy to the rule of the emperor. In contrast, Michael Psellos held that the family was of modest background and was elevated to higher status by Michael VII Doukas. Until the 12th century, the Botaneiatai were military commanders and landowners related to the Komnenos and Doukas families.The exact relation of the other Botaneiatai to Emperor Nikephoros III is not clearly established.

=== Ascension of Nikephoros III ===
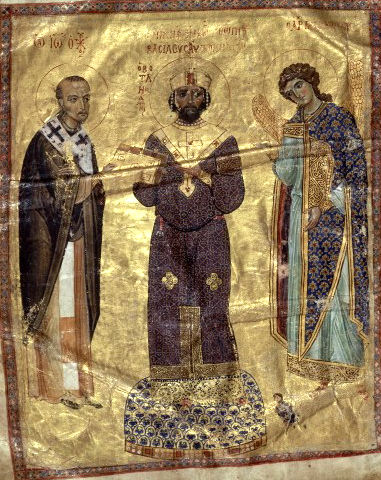
Emperor Nikephoros III with John Chrysostom and Michael the archangel. Bibliothèque nationale de France

The most distinguished member of the family was Nikephoros III Botaneiates, who had a long and successful career in the army before ascending to the Byzantine throne. Nikephoros became a general during the reign of Byzantine Emperor Constantine IX Monomachos, serving in the Pecheneg revolt of 1048–1053, after which he likely received the title of magistros as a reward. In 1057 Nikephoros served in the revolt of Isaac I Komnenos against the Byzantine Emperor Michael VI Bringas which helped him ascend to high military offices. Under the Emperor Constantine X Doukas, he held the titles of doux of Thessalonica (c. 1061) and later doux of Antioch (c. 1066). When Constantine X died in 1067, his wife, Empress Eudokia Makrembolitissa, considered taking Nikephoros as husband and emperor, but she eventually chose Romanos IV Diogenes instead. Romanos exiled Nikephoros to his holdings in the Anatolic Theme, where he remained until he was brought out of retirement by the Emperor Michael VII and made kouropalates and governor of the Anatolic Theme. In October 1077, when Nikephoros Bryennios rebelled in the Balkans, Botaneiates started his struggle for the throne in Anatolia and came into conflict with Michael in 1078. Nikephoros managed to gather strong support and was recognized by the Byzantine Senate as emperor in early 1078. About a year later, he married his second wife, Maria of Alania. During his reign, Nikephoros was preoccupied with the rebellions of Bryennios, Nikephoros Basilakes, Nikephoros Melissenos, and the Komnenoi. He reigned until 1081, when Alexios Komnenos (r. 1081–1118) overthrew him and confined him to the Peribleptos monastery, where he died a few months later.

=== Komnenian period ===
During the Komnenian period, the Botaneiatai continued to hold prominent positions in the Empire thanks to their ties to the Komnenos and Synadenos families. The family became related to the Komnenoi in c. 1085 when a grandson of Nikephoros III married the daughter of Manuel Komnenos, brother of Alexios I. In c. 1110-1112, their alliance was strengthened and Nikephoros Botaneiates was awarded the title of sebastos after his marriage to Eudokia, daughter of sebastokrator Isaac Komnenos. More 12th century members of the family were awarded the title sebastos, indicating that they likely held important positions in the imperial court; these are Manuel, who married Eirene Synadene, and George, who married Zoe Doukaina. Their status significantly changed from the late 12th century onwards; while the name continues to be attested during the 13th and 14th centuries, members of the family do not appear to hold any significant titles.

== See also ==
- Byzantine Empire under the Doukas dynasty

== Sources ==
- Belke, Klaus; Mersisch, Norbert (1990). Tabula Imperii Byzantini, Band 7: Phrygien und Pisidien (in German). Vienna: Verlag der Österreichischen Akademie der Wissenschaften. ISBN 978-3-7001-1698-1.
- Kazhdan, Alexander, ed. (1991). The Oxford Dictionary of Byzantium. Oxford and New York: Oxford University Press. ISBN 0-19-504652-8.
- Krsmanović, Bojana (2003). "Botaneiates family". Encyclopaedia of the Hellenic World, Asia Minor. Foundation of the Hellenic World.
- Leidholm, Nathan (2018). "Nikephoros III Botaneiates, the Phokades, and the Fabii: embellished genealogies and contested kinship in eleventh-century Byzantium". Byzantine and Modern Greek Studies. 42 (2). Cambridge University Press: 185–201. doi:10.1017/byz.2018.4.
- Maynard, Daniel R. F. (20 June 2018). "Nikephoros III Botaniates (A.D. 1078–1081)". De Imperatoribus Romanis. Archived from the original on 3 August 2019.
- American Society of Genealogists, ed. (1980). The Genealogist. 1–2. Organization for the Promotion of Scholarship in Genealogy https://books.google.com/books?id=J7pnAAAAMAAJ.
