= Arianites =

Arianites may refer to:

- David Arianites, strategos autokrator of Bulgaria (fl. 1016–1027)
- Constantine Arianites, magistros and doux of Adrianople
- Constantine Arianiti or Constantine Komnenos Arianites
- George Aryaniti or George Arianites, Lord of Albania (fl. 1434–1461)
- Arianiti family
- Arianites (ammonite), an extinct genus
