= Vestarches =

Byzantine honorific title

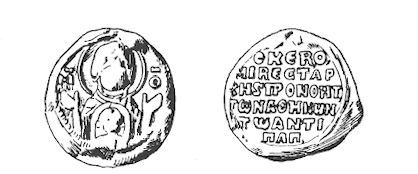
Seal of Michael Antipapos, vestarches and pronoetes of Athens

Vestarches (Greek: βεστάρχης) was a senior Byzantine honorific dignity in use from the late 10th to early 12th centuries.

The term vestarches means 'master of the vestai', another group of high court dignitaries. Etymologically, these terms are related to the vestiarion, the imperial wardrobe, but despite earlier attempts (cf. Bréhier) to connect the vestai or vestarches with the officials of the vestiarion, no such relation appears to have existed.

It is first mentioned in the Escorial Taktikon, a list of offices and court titles and their precedence compiled in the 970s. Initially, it was restricted to senior court eunuchs, but came to be awarded to senior officers as well after the mid-11th century. Its holders included famed generals such as Michael Bourtzes, Nikephoros Melissenos, and possibly also the future Byzantine emperors Nikephoros Botaneiates and Romanos Diogenes, but also some senior judicial officials of Constantinople. In the palace hierarchy, it came between the title of magistros and that of vestes, but was devalued with the general inflation of awards during the latter decades of the 11th century: by the turn of the century, the new title of protovestarches (Greek: πρωτοβεστάρχης, lit. 'first vestarches') is attested as being awarded to judges and notaries. Both titles are in evidence in the early 12th century, but apparently fell completely out of use soon after.

== Sources ==
- Bréhier, Louis (2000) [1949]. Les institutions de l'Empire byzantin (in French). Paris: Albin Michel. ISBN 978-2-226-04722-9.
- Kazhdan, Alexander (1991). "Vestarches". In Kazhdan, Alexander (ed.). The Oxford Dictionary of Byzantium. Oxford and New York: Oxford University Press. p. 2162. ISBN 0-19-504652-8.
- Oikonomides, Nicolas (1972). Les listes de préséance byzantines des IXe et Xe siècles (in French). Paris: Éditions du Centre National de la Recherche Scientifique.
