= Battle of Zygos Pass =

Ambush by the Pechenegs against the Byzantine Empire

- Part of the Pecheneg revolt
Date	1053
Location	Zygos Pass
Result	Pecheneg victory

Belligerents
Byzantine Empire	Pechenegs

Commanders and leaders
Michael Akolouthos; Basil the Synkellos †; Nikephoros Botaneiates	Tyrach

Casualties and losses
Heavy	Unknown

The Battle of Zygos Pass was a successful ambush by the Pechenegs against the Byzantine Empire during the Pecheneg revolt. The nomads dealt heavy losses to the Byzantines; however, a large number of the imperial cavalry managed to escape due to the actions of Nikephoros Botaneiates.

== Prelude ==
By 1053 the Byzantine Emperor Constantine IX had secured the lands south of the Haemus Mountains, and the Byzantines had organised a force to combat the Pechenegs under Tyrach. Constantine IX sent an army under the command of Michael Akolouthos, the Doux of Bulgaria Basil the Synkellos, and Nikephoros Botaneiates, to besiege a Pecheneg encampment near Preslav. However, after the Pechenegs withstood the attack behind their palisade, and after supplies began to run out, the Byzantines lifted the siege and withdrew. As they were heading back to their station, the nomads under Tyrach marched out, circumvented the imperial forces, and prepared an ambush along their route of march at the Zygos Pass.

== Battle and Aftermath ==
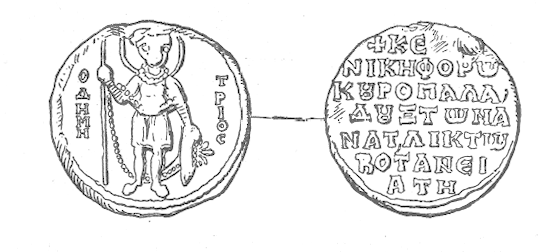
Seal of Nikephoros Botaneiates as kouropalates and doux of the Anatolic Theme

The Pechenegs ambushed imperial forces and inflicted heavy casualties. Basil the Synkellos was among the dead. Nikephoros Botaneiates managed to rally the Byzantine horsemen and fought his way out of the trap with them. While maintaining a tight formation to defend against attacks from the Pecheneg horse archers, he withdrew and encamped his army at a nearby river bank. He also deployed scouts to prevent any further ambushes.

He managed to lead the survivors of the ambush in a 12-day fighting retreat towards Adrianople. During the march, the Pechenegs shot the Byzantine horses, forcing them to continue on foot. The nomads launched several attacks to break the Byzantines, but these were repulsed with heavy losses by Nikephoros. They also unsuccessfully tried to persuade the Byzantines to surrender. One Byzantine soldier offered Nikephoros a horse to escape on, however Nikephoros refused the offer. Once the Byzantine army arrived at the city, the Pechenegs fled. Because of Nikephoros's actions during the battle, Constantine IX awarded him the title of Magistros.

== Sources ==
- Brunet de Presle, Wladimir; Bekker, Immanuel, eds. (1853). Corpus scriptorum historiae Byzantinae: Michaelis Attaliotae historia (in Ancient Greek and Latin). Weber.
- Kaldellis, Anthony (2017). Streams of Gold, Rivers of Blood: The Rise and Fall of Byzantium, 955 A.D. to the First Crusade. Oxford University Press. ISBN 978-0190253226.
- Maynard, Daniel (2018). The Last Bringer of Victory: Nikephoros III Botaneiates AD1078-1081.
- Paroń, Aleksander (2021). The Pechenegs: Nomads in the Political and Cultural Landscape of Medieval Europe. Translated by Anessi, Thomas. Leiden, Boston: Brill. ISBN 978-90-04-44109-5.
