= Hervé Frangopoulos =

11th century Norman mercenary

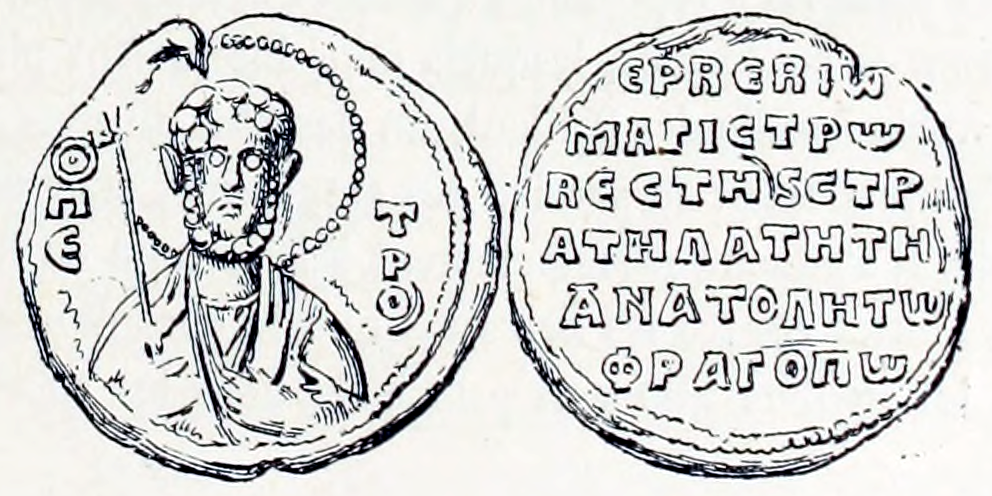
Seal of Frankopoulos with St. Peter on the obverse and his titles of magistros, vestes, and stratelates of the East on the reverse

Hervé (Greek: Ἑρβέβιος, Ervevios or Erbebios; Italian: Erveo), called Frankopoulos or Phrangopoulos (Greek: Φραγκόπουλος, "Son of a Frank"), was a Norman mercenary general in Byzantine service during the 1050s.

== Biography ==
According to Amatus of Montecassino, Hervé and other Norman mercenaries fought for the Byzantine Empire under George Maniakes against the Muslims in Sicily from 1038 to 1040. Between 1040 and 1043, he took part in the campaign against the Greeks of Apulia and received some villages around Avellino (1042/3). At about 1050, he appears as the leader of the Norman mercenaries under Nikephoros Bryennios the Elder and one of the Greek's two chief lieutenants. In the same year, he and Katakalon Kekaumenos were defeated by the Pechenegs near the Danube during the Pecheneg revolt.

In 1056, he demanded the high court title of magistros from Emperor Michael VI Stratiotikos. Refused, he withdrew to his estate in the Armeniac theme. From there, he gathered a following of 300 Normans, and in the spring of 1057 he marched into eastern Asia Minor, around Lake Van. There, he possibly aimed to set up a state for himself and entered into wars with the Armenians and the Seljuk Turks. After initial success, he was captured by a ruse by the emir of Ahlat, Abu Nasr.

Hervé was shipped back to Constantinople in chains, but there he was apparently reconciled to the Byzantine emperor: a surviving seal records his having received the title of magistros, and the positions of vestiarites and stratelates of the East in the army of Emperor Isaac I Komnenos. Around 1063, however, Matthew of Edessa records that the Seljuks who had occupied Amida bribed a certain "Frankabol" to avoid battle. While leading Byzantine forces back from Amida, he and the Doux of Edessa, Diabatenos, met a column of the Seljuk army which was attempting to retreat. Near Theodosiopolis, they annihilated them in a pitched battle, recovered the plunder they had taken, and killed a certain emir Yusuf. However Hervé was executed by Emperor Constantine X Doukas for taking bribes from the Seljuks and for allowing the death of Diabatenos in battle.

He was possibly the founder of the late Byzantine Phrangopoulos family.

== Sources ==
- Gravett, Christopher; Nicolle, David (2006). The Normans: Warrior Knights and their Castles. Oxford, United Kingdom: Osprey Publishing Limited. ISBN 1-84603-218-0.
- Kazhdan, Alexander Petrovich, ed. (1991). Oxford Dictionary of Byzantium. New York, New York and Oxford, United Kingdom: Oxford University Press. ISBN 978-0-19-504652-6.
- Kaldellis, Anthony (2017). Streams of Gold, Rivers of Blood: The Rise and Fall of Byzantium, 955 A.D. to the First Crusade. Oxford University Press. ISBN 978-0190253226.
- Theotokis, Georgios; Mesko, Marek (2020). War in Eleventh-Century Byzantium. Taylor & Francis. ISBN 9780429576881.

== See also ==
- Roussel de Bailleul
