= Stratelates =

Greek term designating a general

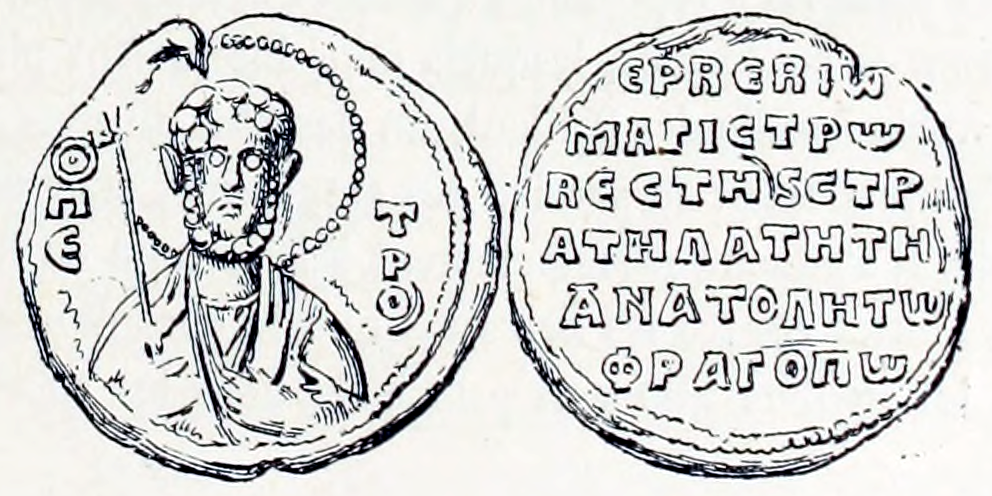
Seal of the magistros, vestēs, and stratēlatēs of the East Hervé Frankopoulos

Stratēlatēs (Greek: στρατηλάτης, "driver/leader of the army") was a Greek term designating a general, which also became an honorary dignity in the Byzantine Empire. In the former sense, it was often applied to military saints, such as Theodore Stratelates.

In the late Roman/early Byzantine Empire, the title was used, along with the old-established stratēgos, to translate into Greek the office of magister militum ("master of the soldiers"). In the 6th century, however, Novel 90 of Emperor Justinian I (r. 527–565) attests the existence of a middle-ranking honorific title of stratēlatēs, which ranked alongside the apo eparchōn ("former prefect"). A prōtostratēlatēs ("first stratēlatēs") Theopemptos is attested in a 7th-century seal, likely indicating the senior-most dignitary among the entire class of the stratēlatai. This stratēlasia was a purely honorary dignity, attached to no office, and declined measurably in prestige during the 7th and 8th centuries: sigillographic evidence shows that it came to be held by the lower rung of the imperial bureaucracy, such as kommerkiarioi (customs supervisors), kouratores (supervisors of imperial establishments) and notarioi (imperial secretaries). By the late 9th century, it ranked at the bottom of the hierarchy of imperial dignities (along with the apo eparchōn), as attested in the 899 Klētorologion of Philotheos. The Klētorologion also records that the dignity was conferred by the award of a codicil or diploma (Greek: χάρτης), retaining 6th-century practice. In the 10th-11th centuries, the term returned to its original military meaning, being used for senior generals, including the commanders-in-chief (the Domestics of the Schools) of East and West.

At the same time, however, the presence of a tagma (professional standing regiment) called the Stratēlatai is attested in Asia Minor in the late 10th century, formed by Emperor John I Tzimiskes (r. 969–976).

== Sources ==
- Bury, John Bagnell (1911). The Imperial Administrative System of the Ninth Century - With a Revised Text of the Kletorologion of Philotheos. London: Oxford University Press.
- Kazhdan, Alexander (1991). "Stratelates". In Kazhdan, Alexander (ed.). The Oxford Dictionary of Byzantium. Oxford and New York: Oxford University Press. p. 1965. ISBN 0-19-504652-8.
- Kühn, Hans-Joachim (1991). Die byzantinische Armee im 10. und 11. Jahrhundert: Studien zur Organisation der Tagmata (in German). Vienna: Fassbaender Verlag. ISBN 3-9005-38-23-9.
