= Church of St. George of Samatya =

Church of St. George of Samatya Սամաթիոյ Սուրբ Գէորգ Եկեղեցի
- Surp Kevork
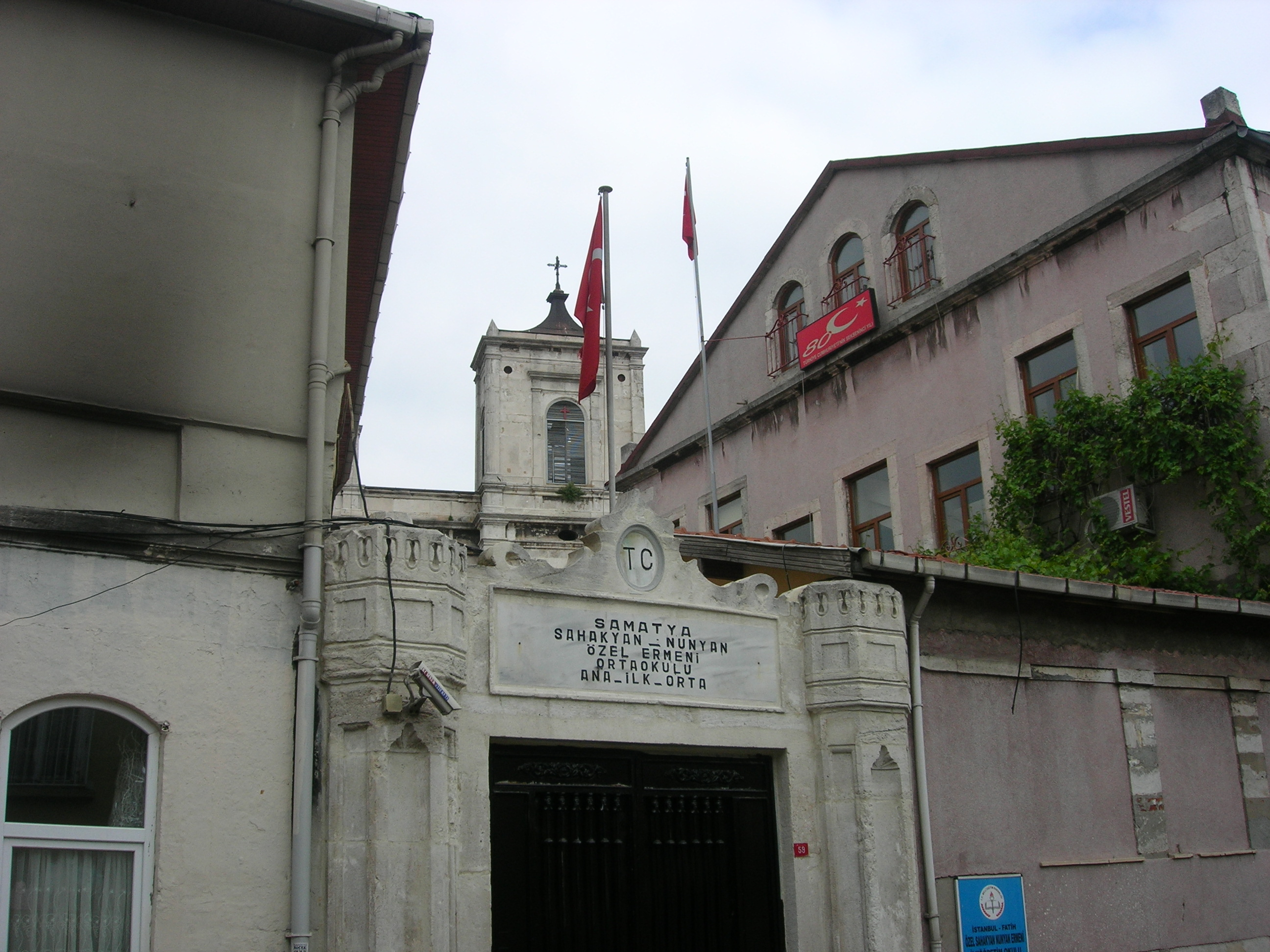
- The entrance of the modern church viewed from north

- Location within Istanbul Fatih
- 41.00188°N 28.93302°E
- Location: Samatya, Istanbul
- Country: Turkey
- Denomination: Armenian Apostolic

History
- Founder: Romanos III Argyros
- Dedication: St. Mary Peribleptos

Architecture
- Architect: Bedros Nemtze
- Groundbreaking: 1866
- Completed: 1887

Saint George of Samatya or Surp Kevork (Armenian: Սամաթիոյ Սուրբ Գէորգ Եկեղեցի; Turkish name: Sulu Manastır, meaning: "Water Monastery") is an Armenian church in Istanbul, Turkey.

The edifice, built between 1866 and 1887, has been erected above the substructure of a Byzantine church and monastery built in the eleventh century. The complex, dedicated to St. Mary Peribleptos (Greek: Μονὴ τῆς Θεοτòκου τῆς Περιβλὲπτου, Monì tis Theotókou tis Perivléptou) was one of the most important Greek Orthodox monasteries in Constantinople. After the Ottoman conquest of the city in 1453 it was ceded to the Armenian community in Constantinople, and became for a period the seat of the Armenian Patriarchate of Constantinople.

== Location ==
The church is located in Istanbul, in the district of Fatih, in the neighbourhood of Kocamustafapaşa (historically Samatya), at Marmara Caddesi 79. It lies inside the walled city, at a short distance from the shore of the Sea of Marmara. The building is protected by a high wall, and surrounded by other edifices.

== History ==
=== Byzantine period ===
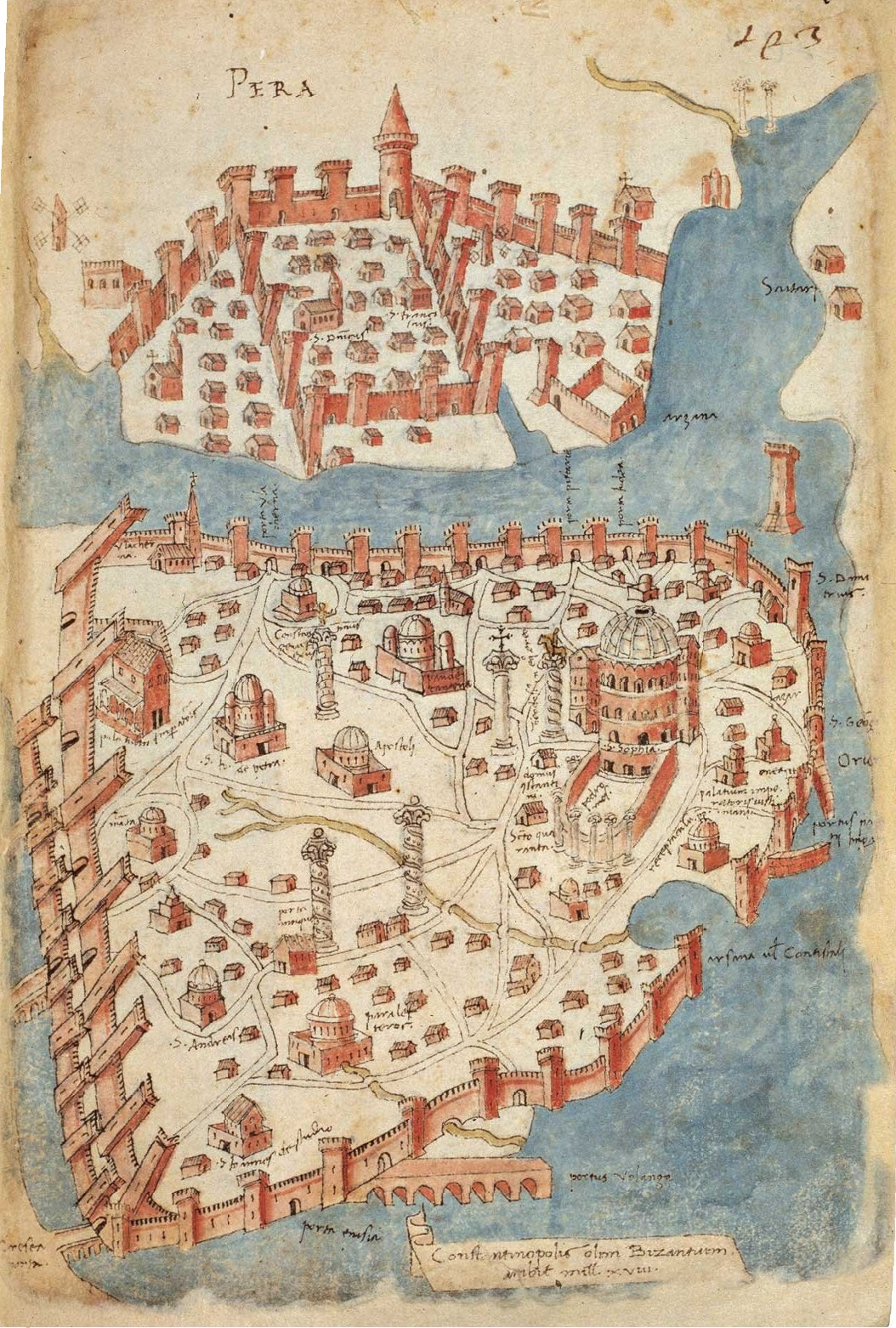
Map of Constantinople around 1420, after Cristoforo Buondelmonti. The Church of Peribleptos is the domed building on the lower left part of the map. The creek shown in the picture originates from the holy source.

In the fifth century on this place stood the church of Hagios Stephanos en tais Aurelianai. This church was located near the Helenianai Palace and the monastery of St. Dalmatios, close to an abundant water source (Greek: Hagiasma). From this source, still existing, originates the Turkish name of the complex ("Water Monastery").

Not far from these buildings and from the sea walls, on a small plateau on the southern slope of the seventh hill of Constantinople, in the Xerolophos quartier, Byzantine Emperor Romanos III Argyros (r. 1028–1034) founded a large monastery dedicated to the Theotokos Peribleptos after his unlucky expedition to Syria. The appellation, meaning "conspicuous", "easy to see", originates from its dominating and isolated position. The Emperor spent a great deal of money to erect the building, and was harshly criticized for that. Romanos was buried here in 1034. Emperor Nikephoros III Botaneiates (r. 1078–1081) repaired the complex in 1080. After his deposition, Nikephoros was obliged by his successor, Alexios I Komnenos (r. 1081–1118) to become a monk here, and was buried in the church as well.

In the 11th-12th centuries, it was usual for the court to come to the Peribleptos each year to celebrate the candlemas. After the Latin sack of 1204, the church remained for a short time under Greek control, but was later given to Venetian Benedictine monks. After the end of the Latin Empire, Michael VIII Palaiologos (r. 1261–1282) restored the church and added in the refectory a mosaic representing himself with his wife Theodora and their son Constantine. This mosaic was destroyed in the great fire of Samatya in 1782.

At the end of the thirteenth century a young monk of the monastery, Hylarion, sent to Elegmoi in Bithynia to look after the possessions of the monastery, found the region ravaged by the Turks. He successfully organised the population against the raiders and after confronting them made the area safe again, but that caused a great scandal in Constantinople, since monks were not allowed to fight. After he was forced to go back to the capital, the Turkish pillaging started again, until the inhabitants of Elegmoi sent a petition to Constantinople asking for his return. At the end the Hegumen of the monastery was forced to give his consent.

The building was damaged in 1402 by fire and lightning. In 1422, Emperor Manuel II Palaiologos (r. 1391–1425) lived in this monastery during an epidemic and the siege of the city by the Ottoman Sultan Murad II.

=== Ottoman period ===
Immediately after the Conquest of Constantinople in 1453, the church continued to belong to the Greek Orthodox Church. According to Müller-Wiener, between 1461 and 1480 (the resettling of Armenians in Samatya occurred in 1458/862 AH), Sultan Mehmed II (r. 1444–46, 1451–81) ceded the church to the Armenian community, and until 1643/44 the complex was the seat of the Armenian Patriarchate of Constantinople. Other sources report that the building was given to the Armenians in 1643 because of the intercession of an Armenian woman, named Şivekâr, who was a favourite of Sultan Ibrahim I (r. 1640–1648). During this period several churches were built here. By the middle of the seventeenth century the only Byzantine building still visible was the refectory.

In 1722 the complex was renovated by the Armenian architect Meldon, but in 1782 everything was destroyed by the great fire of Samatya. The reconstruction took place in 1804.

Between 1866 and 1887 (after another fire in 1877), the church was rebuilt as endowment of Michael Hagopian, and only the foundations of the Byzantine church and remains of the source building were kept in place. Moreover, two large schools were built near the church.

== Description ==
The Castilian ambassador Ruy González de Clavijo (practically the only extant source about the complex in the Byzantine period), who visited Constantinople in 1402, writes that the plan of St. Mary was a central one, with a square nave surmounted by a dome with an atrium and side rooms, similar to the contemporary churches of Hosios Loukas and Daphni Monastery in Greece. The hemispherical dome – decorated with a mosaic – rested upon eight columns of polychrome Jasper which sustained four squinches. These made a transition from the octagonal base to the square defined by the walls. Recent excavations confirmed the description of Clavijo. The church, whose walls and floor were also covered with jasper slabs, contained several imperial tombs, placed in two side rooms. Its outer walls were richly decorated with paintings representing towns and castles which were endowed to the monastery. A large refectory adorned with a fresco depicting the Last Supper, rooms for the monks, gardens and vineyards were part of the complex. In the church were also exhibited several relics, among them the body of Saint Gregory.

The present church is a rectangular building, whose sides are about twenty and thirty meters long. It is oriented in SW – NE direction. The church has an apse on the NE side and a bell-gable. The interior is covered with a barrel vault and is lavishly decorated. Over the Ayazma, considered to be one of the most beautiful in Istanbul, is built a chapel dedicated to Saint John the Forerunner.

== Sources ==
- Mamboury, Ernest (1953). The Tourists' Istanbul. Istanbul: Çituri Biraderler Basimevi.
- Janin, Raymond (1953). La Géographie ecclésiastique de l'Empire byzantin. 1. Part: Le Siège de Constantinople et le Patriarcat Oecuménique. 3rd Vol. : Les Églises et les Monastères (in French). Paris: Institut Français d'Etudes Byzantines.
- Eyice, Semavi (1955). Istanbul. Petite Guide a travers les Monuments Byzantins et Turcs (in French). Istanbul: Istanbul Matbaası.
- Müller-Wiener, Wolfgang (1977). Bildlexikon Zur Topographie Istanbuls: Byzantion, Konstantinupolis, Istanbul Bis Zum Beginn D. 17 Jh (in German). Tübingen: Wasmuth. ISBN 978-3-8030-1022-3.
- Ronchey, Silvia; Braccini, Tommaso (2010). Il romanzo di Costantinopoli. Guida letteraria alla Roma d'Oriente (in Italian). Torino: Einaudi. ISBN 978-88-06-18921-1.
