= Nikephoros III Botaneiates =

Byzantine Emperor from 1078 to 1081

- Emperor and Autocrat of the Romans
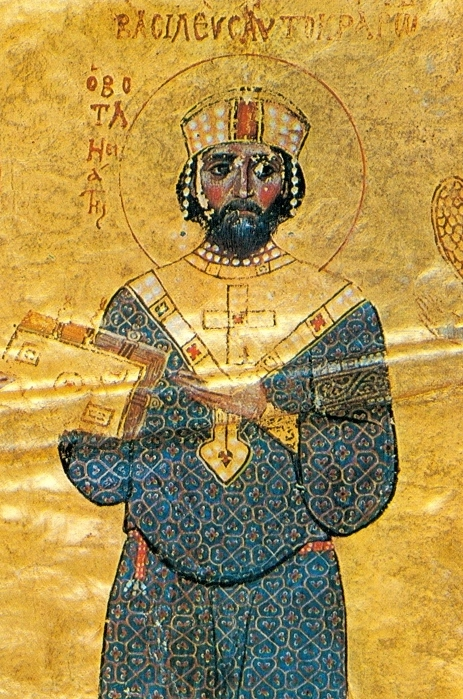

Byzantine emperor
- Reign: 7 January 1078 – 1 April 1081
- Coronation: 3 April 1078 (Note: 3 April according to the Skylitzes Continuatus, 27 March according to Michael Attaleiates.)
- Predecessor: Michael VII Doukas
- Successor: Alexios I Komnenos
- Born: 1002
- Died: after 1 April 1081 (aged 78/79); Monastery of Peribleptus, Constantinople (now Istanbul, Turkey)
- Wife: Vevdene Maria of Alania
- Issue: Michael Botaneiates
- Family: Botaneiates
- Dynasty: Doukas
- Father: Michael Botaneiates
- Religion: Eastern Orthodox

Nikephoros III Botaneiates (Greek: Νικηφόρος Βοτανειάτης, romanized: Nikēphóros Botaneiatēs; 1002–1081), Latinized as Nicephorus III Botaniates, was Byzantine Emperor from 7 January 1078 to 1 April 1081. He became a general during the reign of Byzantine Emperor Constantine IX Monomachos, serving with distinction during the Pecheneg revolt of 1048–1053. In 1057 he aided Isaac I Komnenos in overthrowing Emperor Michael VI Bringas, leading forces at the decisive Battle of Petroe. Under the Emperor Constantine X Doukas Nikephoros was made doux, first of Thessalonica and subsequently of Antioch. In the latter position he repelled numerous incursions from the Emirate of Aleppo. Constantine X died in 1067 and Empress Eudokia Makrembolitissa married Romanos IV Diogenes; Nikephoros, who had also been a candidate for Eudokia's hand and the position of emperor, was exiled and remained in retirement until Emperor Michael VII summoned him to serve as kouropalates and governor of the Anatolic Theme.

Having insulted Emperor Michael with overly frank appeals for help against the Seljuk Turks in Byzantine Anatolia, Nikephoros decided to protect himself from reprisals by seizing the throne. His military acumen and family renown won him strong support, and he took power in 1078 with the approval of the Byzantine Senate and the citizens of Constantinople. As emperor he faced numerous revolts, including those of Nikephoros Bryennios, Nikephoros Basilakes, and Constantine Doukas, as well as an attempted assassination by the Varangian Guard. Nikephoros performed many acts to increase his legitimacy and support, spending large amounts on donatives for the army and his supporters, forgiving all debt in arrears, and instituting minor legal reforms. Diplomatically, he secured the submission of Theodore Gabras and Philaretos Brachamios, governors of Trebizond and Antioch, respectively, who had become de facto independent of the Byzantine Empire.

In 1081, Alexios I Komnenos, sent to counter a Norman invasion, instead conspired to make himself emperor. He captured Constantinople on 1 April and arrested Nikephoros, who abdicated and became a monk in the Monastery of Peribleptus.

== Historiography and sources ==
The most comprehensive account of Nikephoros III's life and reign is The History, written in the 1070s by the Byzantine historian Michael Attaleiates and dedicated to Nikephoros himself. Attaleiates is the primary contemporary source for Nikephoros's reign and counters the narrative of Byzantine historian Michael Psellos's Chronographia, the only other contemporary source. Attaleiates highlights Nikephoros's achievements, often recording actions which no other source mentions, such as his eleven-day rearguard command after the Battle of Zygos Pass, to which Attaleiates dedicates several pages. Attaleiates's high opinion of Nikephoros was likely shaped by Nikephoros raising him to the rank of vestes, and by his benefiting from Nikephoros's patronage. Much of Attaleiates's work is shaped by his personal opinion of contemporary events, such as his bias against Nikephoros's predecessor, Emperor Michael VII Doukas.

The Battle of Manzikert in 1071 is mentioned only in a single paragraph by Psellos, who chiefly comments that Emperor Romanos IV Diogenes should have studied strategy better; however, Attaleiates devotes an entire chapter to the details of the decisive battle, including the events before and after the battle, while also giving his own commentary and anecdotes of the actions and mistakes which were made. Attaleiates is invaluable in providing an understanding of what the populace of the Byzantine Empire, outside of the nobles of Constantinople, thought of the Turkish invasion of Anatolia. These opinions explain why Attaleiates condemns Michael VII and praises Nikephoros to such a degree: in the view of the average Byzantine, Michael was primarily at fault for the loss of Byzantine Anatolia, Attaleiates's homeland, whereas Nikephoros, a fellow Anatolian, actively worked to prevent the further collapse of the Byzantine Empire.

Psellos's Chronographia is largely useless in understanding the life of Nikephoros; while he provides a contemporary source from the view of the Byzantine nobles, he is far from objective in his review of events, although his retelling of Michael's letter to Nikephoros is useful as it shares both Michael's and Psellos's opinion of the events. While Attaleiates generally provides a favorable account of Nikephoros, he does mention some of his failings, such as his defeat by the Oghuz Turks in 1063, whereas Psellos intentionally fails to mention several failings of Michael VII in his panegyrical chapter on him, including his loss of Anatolia to the Seljuk Turks and the debasement of currency which took place under him. The other main source for Nikephoros's reign is Anna Komnene's Alexiad, although she was born after the events, and the first sections of her account are generally derived from the writings of her husband Nikephoros Bryennios the Younger. She is also biased as a result of being the daughter of Byzantine Emperor Alexios I Komnenos, who seized the throne from Nikephoros, causing the account to be from the view of Alexios's rise. While her narrative primarily focuses on the actions of Alexios, it does provide information on Nikephoros's last years in power and his subsequent exile to a monastery.

Nikephoros is briefly mentioned by John Skylitzes in his Synopsis of Histories, which covers the events of 811–1057, but is referenced far more in Skylitzes's Continuatus. Although Skylitzes is a contemporary source, his Continuatus was written under Alexios, whom he is known to have favored; however, he generally follows the more objective account of Attaleiates, who was one of his main sources. Nikephoros Bryennius the Younger's Material for a History chiefly relies on the testimonies of his contemporaries, including his father, Nikephoros Bryennios the Elder, and Alexios himself; however, it also relies on the works of Attaleiates, Psellos, and Skylitzes. Nikephoros Bryennios's bias in favor of Alexios and against Nikephoros III is an inevitable result of being married to Alexios's daughter, and of the fact that his father was blinded by Nikephoros. These authors mostly cover the career of Nikephoros from his role in the Battle of the Zygos Pass in 1053 to his death.

William of Apulia, a Norman historian who wrote in the 1090s, mentions Nikephoros during his account of Robert Guiscard's invasion of the Byzantine Empire in 1081; as a foreigner, he was removed from the court politics of the Byzantine Empire, and thus provides a fair and objective view of Nikephoros. Nikephoros is also mentioned in the accounts of both Matthew of Edessa and Michael the Syrian, who wrote their chronicles several centuries after the events and are therefore quite objective in their treatment of Nikephoros, lacking political intrigue related to him. Michael is quite brief in his account of Nikephoros, but gives a balanced view – while he portrays Michael VII as incompetent and corrupt, he does praise Nikephoros as Attaleiates does. Michael's usefulness is limited by his brevity on the subject, although it is likely, based on the contents of his chronicle, that Attaleiates himself served as a source. Matthew's chronicle is longer, but clearly derived from the work of Psellos, as Matthew openly praises Michael VII while ridiculing Nikephoros, who he portrays as a hedonistic womanizer; ironically the exact accusation which Michael the Syrian makes against Michael VII.

== Biography ==
=== Early life and family ===
Nikephoros was born in 1002 to Michael Botaneiates and his wife, members of the Botaneiates family, a prominent military family from the Anatolic Theme. According to Attaleiates, Nikephoros's grandfather Nikephoros and father Michael both served as commanders under Basil II (r. 976–1025) during his campaigns against the Georgians and his conquest of Bulgaria; Attaleiates is the only source which gives this information. Attaleiates also states that the Botaneiatai family was related to Byzantine Emperor Nikephoros II Phokas and the Phokas family. This was almost certainly used by Nikephoros to add legitimacy to his later rule, and this is corroborated by Psellos, who calls Nikephoros III "Phokas" in his reproduction of Byzantine Emperor Michael VII Doukas's letter to him. Konstantinos Varzos believes that Nikephoros III's great-grandfather married a daughter of Leo Phokas the Younger, brother of Nikephoros II. Christian Settipani proposes a slightly different interpretation; he speculates that Nikephoros III's great-grandfather (whom he identifies with Michael Botaneiates, notarios and protonotarios) instead married a daughter of Nikephoros II himself.

At an unknown date, Nikephoros married a woman named Vevdene, but he later married Maria of Alania, the former wife of Michael VII. From Vevdene, Nikephoros had one son, probably named Michael, born c. 1045. Michael predeceased his father, passing away c. 1078. Michael's son Nikephoros was born c. 1068; in 1081, Anna Dalassene arranged his betrothal with Anna, daughter of her son Manuel Komnenos; the marriage took place c. 1085.

Little is known of Nikephoros's life before 1053, other than that he served as a commander under Emperor Constantine IX Monomachos during the Pecheneg revolt of 1048–1053.

=== Early career ===
Nikephoros first attracts the attention of his Byzantine contemporaries and historians for his actions after the Battle of Zygos Pass in 1053. Attaleiates records that Nikephoros was able to wield effective command over his retreating mounted troops, preventing them from being overrun by Pecheneg forces during the Pecheneg revolt. Nikephoros ordered his cavalry to hold a tight formation, limiting the damage the horse-archers of the Pechenegs could inflict and deployed scouts to prevent his troops from being ambushed. During his maneuvering, the Pechenegs attempted to assault his troops and break their formation several times, but each time they were rebuffed. Nikephoros led his troops for eleven days in spite of constant harassment. According to Attaleiates, the Pechenegs attempted to convince the Byzantines to surrender and killed their horses with their bows when this failed. Nikephoros had them continue on foot and refused to flee when offered a horse, proclaiming he would prefer death to the dishonor of cowardice, which reinforced the morale of his troops. After eleven days of constant attacks, they reached the Byzantine city of Adrianople, where the Pechenegs finally gave up their pursuit. For his actions, Emperor Constantine IX awarded Nikephoros the high court rank of magistros. While it is possible that his actions were exaggerated by Attaleiates, it fits comfortably with his reputation as a strong commander.

Nikephoros is next mentioned for his role in the revolt of Isaac I Komnenos against the Byzantine Emperor Michael VI Bringas (r. 1056–1057) in 1057. This revolt was a result of Michael's favoritism toward the civil officials of Constantinople, and his scorn toward the military elites. After the Dynatoi were humiliated by Michael by his refusal to grant them any gifts, Isaac attempted to reconcile with Michael, only to be personally insulted by him, sparking a civil war, which is mentioned by Skylitzes, Psellos, and Attaleiates; Psellos himself led the embassy from Michael to Isaac. Isaac then gathered the support of other military elites before marching for Constantinople. At Constantinople, the Battle of Petroe took place on 20 August 1057, a decisive victory for Isaac, and reportedly one of the bloodiest battles the Byzantines engaged in during a civil war. Isaac's victory placed the military aristocracy firmly back in control and marked the first time a general had held the throne since the death of Emperor Basil II in 1025. Nikephoros led a wing of Isaac's forces during the battle, suggesting he had been a part of Isaac's inner circle; Skylitzes mentions that during this battle Nikephoros fought a duel against one of Michael's mercenaries, Randolf the Frank. In 1059, Isaac placed Nikephoros in command of the Danube frontier, where he remained until 1064. During his time at this command, he saved the life of the future Emperor Romanos IV Diogenes during Isaac's campaign against the Hungarians.

By October 1061 at the latest, Nikephoros was serving as doux of Thessalonica. The evidence for his time in Thessalonica comes from several surviving signed and dated documents from the Iveron Monastery on Mount Athos. The first of these is an engraphon dated to December 1061. It mentions that Iveron's abbot and two of its monks had delivered an order from Constantine X Doukas (r. 1059–1067) to Nikephoros, doux of Thessalonica, in October (so Nikephoros's tenure must have begun by then). The next two documents are a praktikon and a hypomnema both dated to August 1062. The praktikon still has a seal of Nikephoros's attached to it, and all three documents also have Nikephoros's signature. He misspelled his own name on all three. (Note: Just about every piece of writing that can be attributed to Nikephoros is riddled with spelling errors.) A fourth Athonite document, dated to February 1063, is signed by a doux of Thessalonica named Theodoros Dalassenos, so Nikephoros's time as doux of Thessalonica must have ended by then.

The Iveron documents record some of Nikephoros's activity settling complaints in the theme of Thessalonica. The first complaint we know of was a dispute centered on the Byzantine government's confiscation of some of the property and Paroikoi (serfs) of the Iveron Monastery of Mount Athos, which the monastery viewed as unlawful. Nikephoros sent Michael the spatharokandidatos to inquire into the case, before ruling that, based upon a chrysobull issued by Basil II which had declared that the monastery's property and Paroikoi were exempt from taxes, they could not be confiscated by the government. Nikephoros settled another dispute in February 1062, this time between the Monastery of Lavra and Theodoros of Aichmalotou, a local landowner, over monastic property; Nikephoros ruled in favor of the monastery. Nikephoros settled a boundary dispute between the Iveron Monastery and the Bishop of Ezoba, basing his ruling on the knowledge of the local populace. The last Thessalonian dispute we know of that Nikephoros ruled on was between the Iveron Monastery and the metochion of Melissourgeion; the metochion appears to have ignored a ruling previously made by Empress Theodora Porphyrogenita, which Nikephoros reasserted.

In the fall of 1064, the Oghuz Turks invaded the Byzantine Balkans and defeated both Nikephoros and Basil Apokapes, archon of Paristrion, in battle, and took them captive, which Attaleiates suggests was greatly humiliating for Nikephoros; however, the two men were able to escape captivity after the Oghuz Turk forces were devastated by both Bulgarian raids and disease. The surviving Oghuz Turks were quickly recruited into the Byzantine army.

Nikephoros may have also served as doux of Cyprus sometime in the mid-1060s. The only source for this is Bar Hebraeus, who wrote that Nikephoros "ruled first over the island of Cyprus, and then over Antioch". Olga Karagiorgou suggests a date of c. 1065-67 for this stage in Nikephoros's career.

=== Later military career ===
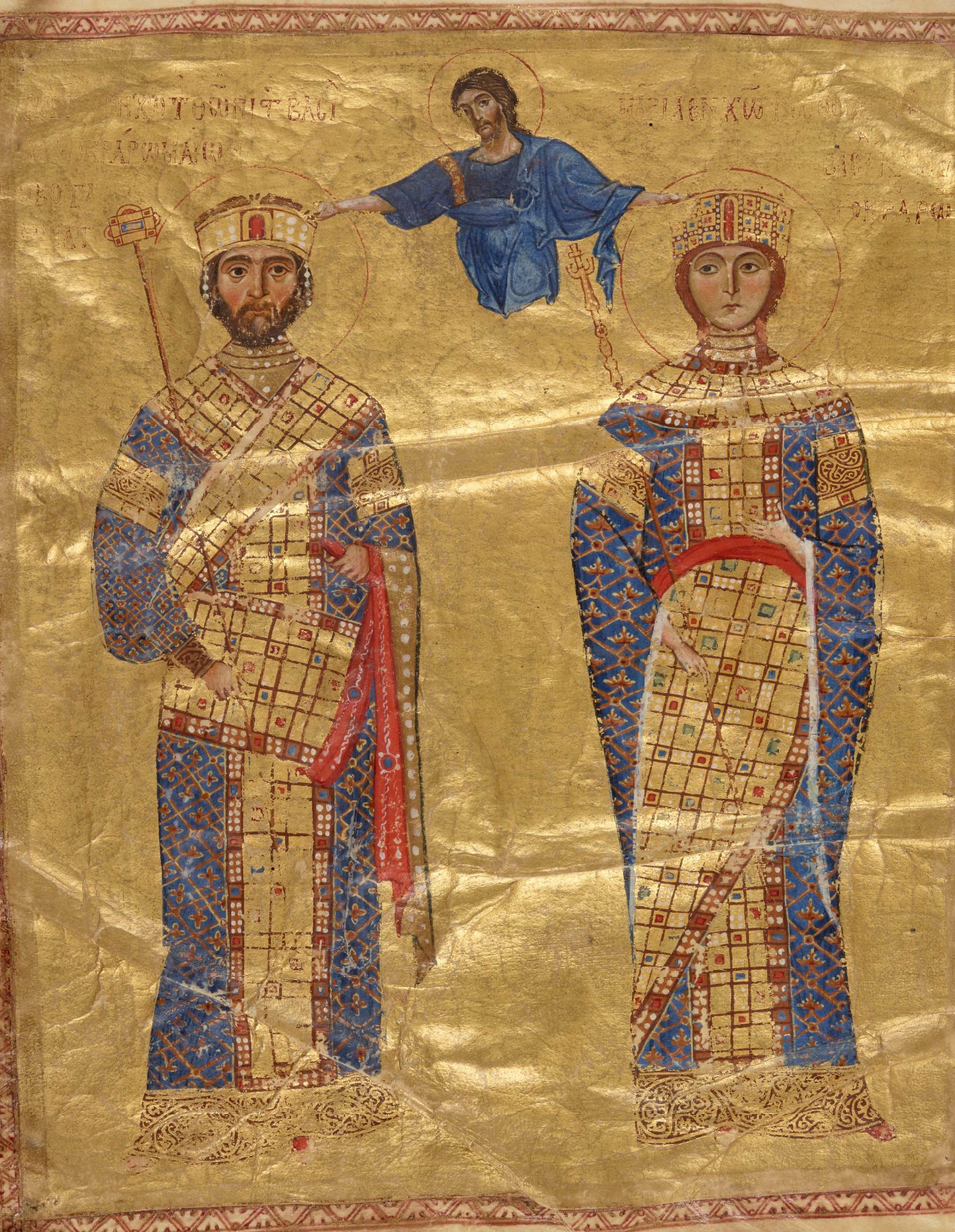
Emperor Nikephoros III Botaneiates and Maria of Alania

Nikephoros was reassigned as doux of Antioch in c.1065 by Constantine X due to the mismanagement of the province by its previous doux, Nikephoritzes, who would later serve as logothetes under Michael VII. Although his troops were inexperienced and under-equipped, Nikephoros was able to repel numerous raids against Antioch from the Emirate of Aleppo, largely due to his own military prowess, his well-trained retinue, and his use of local levies. Nikephoros was relieved of his command in c. 1067, likely due to the political efforts of the civil officials, who wished to eliminate the military aristocracy, of which Nikephoros was a member. The political machinations of the civil officials, and their willingness to undermine the military elites, had built up under previous emperors such as Romanos III (r. 1028–1034) and Michael VI; during this period the civil officials had become increasingly powerful, until Isaac I's reforms definitively curbed their power. Constantine X had become emperor when Isaac abdicated in 1059 and was considerably weaker than Isaac had been, allowing the civil officials to manipulate him, thereby preventing him from gaining the level of control that Isaac had. This was largely accomplished by undermining the military aristocracy, even while the Turks had begun to invade Byzantine Armenia.

Upon the death of Constantine X in 1067, his wife, Empress Eudokia Makrembolitissa, considered taking Nikephoros as husband and emperor, but instead chose Romanos IV Diogenes (r. 1068–1071). The need for an emperor was made pressing by the constant raids of the Turks into the Byzantine territories of Antioch, Cilicia, and Armenia; Eudokia, Patriarch John VIII of Constantinople, and the Byzantine Senate agreed that their top priority was the defense of the empire and that they needed an emperor to lead troops to repel the Turks. Nikephoros was the favorite candidate of the senate, but was in the field leading troops in Antioch, and was still married to Vevdene. Romanos was already in Constantinople and had no wife, making him a much more suitable candidate; Matthew of Edessa also suggests that Eudokia already desired Romanos over Nikephoros. Upon taking power, Romanos exiled Nikephoros to his holdings in the Anatolic Theme and excluded him from the Manzikert campaign due to questionable loyalty, likely because he had been Eudokia's other candidate for the throne, and thus posed a threat to Romanos's rule. After Romanos was captured by the Seljuks at the disastrous Battle of Manzikert, Nikephoros did not involve himself in the coup d'état of Michael VII against the still-captive Romanos, and would not again lead troops until the uprising of the mercenary leader Roussel de Bailleul.

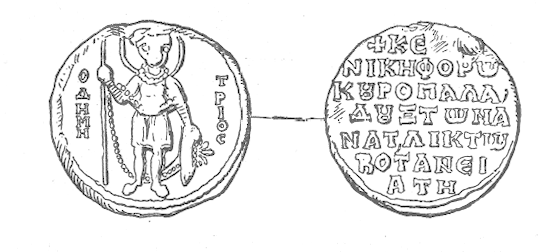
Seal of Nikephoros Botaneiates as kouropalates and doux of the Anatolic Theme

Emperor Michael VII (r. 1071–1078) brought Nikephoros, who was now in his early seventies, out of retirement and declared him kouropalates and governor of the Anatolic Theme. The title of kouropalates was reserved for esteemed members of the imperial court who were not related to the ruling dynasty, and officially designated him as a high-ranking general; the title of kouropalates was below the rank of nobilissimus and two ranks below the title of Caesar. None of the sources specifically mention why Nikephoros was recalled to lead forces, but it is likely due to a few reasons: Nikephoros was a renowned commander who had served under the Doukas emperors, he did not have any loyalty to Romanos IV, and the main theater of war was in the eastern portion of the Byzantine Empire, the terrain of which Nikephoros knew well; he likely gained the military governorship of the Anatolic Theme because it was his homeland. Michael VII then sent Nikephoros and the Caesar John Doukas to defeat the rebellion of Roussel de Bailleul. Nikephoros warned John not to cross the Zompos Bridge and engage the forces of Roussel, but John disregarded him and led his troops to defeat at the Battle of the Zompos Bridge in 1074. Nikephoros, who commanded the rearguard, held his troops back from fighting in the battle; modern historians have debated exactly why he chose to withhold his troops, and whether they could have turned the tide of the battle. After the defeat of the forces under John, Nikephoros gathered the survivors and led them with his troops back to his estates in the Anatolic Theme.

=== Revolt ===
Nikephoros, seeing how dire the situation of the Byzantine Empire was, sent a letter to Emperor Michael in 1077 pleading with him to address the rapidly worsening situation in Byzantine Anatolia. Michael was insulted by the directness of one of his subordinates, and turned against Nikephoros, forcing him to rebel against Michael to protect himself from imprisonment. Nikephoros declared himself emperor shortly after, on 2 July/October 1077, mobilizing an army of native troops and Turkish mercenaries. (Note: Michael Attaleiates states that Nikephoros was proclaimed emperor on 2 July 1078, but the year is most probably wrong. The Skylitzes Continuatus states he was proclaimed emperor in October, with an omen happening on the 3rd. A 16th-century chronicle records that he reigned for 3 years ½, suggesting that the month was October.) Michael sent Nikephoros a letter in which he reminded Nikephoros that he owed much to the emperor who had brought him out of exile. A month later, in November 1077, the general Nikephoros Bryennios the Elder raised his own revolt against Michael. The military acumen and family renown of Nikephoros (III) helped him to solidify his support base, and the tyranny of Michael ensured that even some of the elites of Constantinople sided with Nikephoros—something Attaleiates notes as being very rare, since generally people defect from the usurper's side to the emperor's side. The defection of some of the capital elites was even more astonishing because the march from the Anatolic Theme to Constantinople was not safe due to Turkish raids, which had reached deep into Anatolia by 1078, meaning that Nikephoros's rebellion might be destroyed before it even reached Constantinople. On 7 January 1078, the Byzantine Senate proclaimed Nikephoros III as emperor, although he was still far from the city. Michael's wife, Maria of Alania, seeing that Michael would soon be overthrown, defected to the side of Nikephoros. Michael VII abdicated after a popular uprising and was forced to become a monk on 31 March. Three days later, on 3 April, (Note: This is the chronology given by the Skylitzes Continuatus and is the one commonly used by modern historians. Attaleiates, however, dates Michael's abdication and Nikephoros's arrival on 24 and 27 March respectively.) Nikephoros entered Constantinople and seized the throne. Upon taking power, Nikephoros married Maria of Alania, exiled Michael to a monastery, a common Byzantine practice for removing threats to the throne since the 7th century, and according to Michael the Syrian castrated Michael's son or sons. Michael the Syrian reports that castration of the sons was viewed poorly by the Byzantine nobility, possibly due to the brutality of the act, although he does not provide an in-depth explanation of exactly why the Byzantine elite opposed it.

=== Reign ===
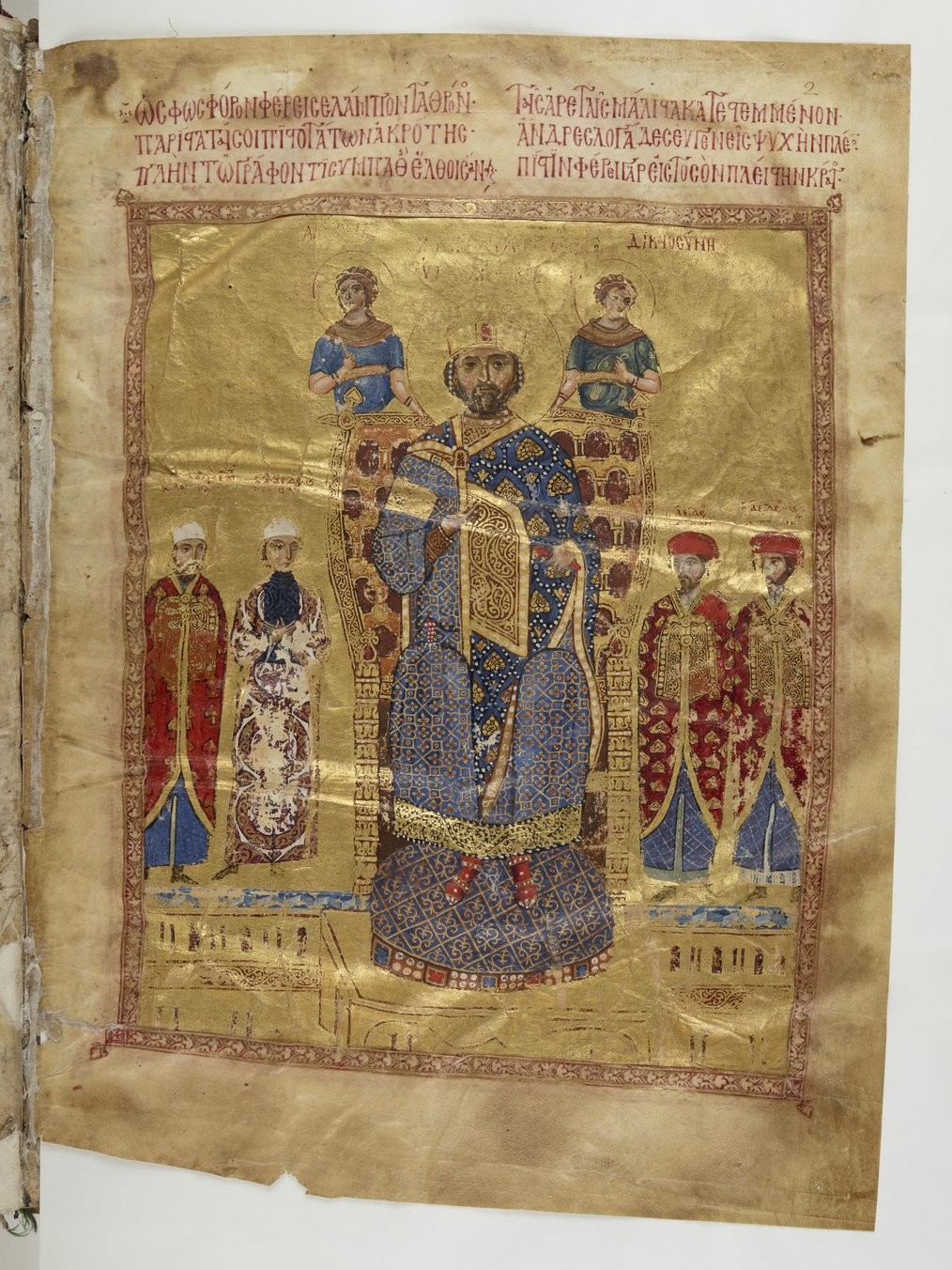
Byzantine Emperor Nikephoros III flanked by personifications of Truth and Justice, and by his senior court dignitaries from illuminated manuscript dated between 1074 and 1081

During the reign of Nikephoros, he had to contend with four revolts and plots before the revolt of Alexios I Komnenos which ultimately ended his reign. The first revolt was that of Nikephoros Bryennios, who had contended for the throne of Michael VII at the same time as Nikephoros III; Nikephoros, now too old to command armies, sent Alexios Komnenos to defeat him. Once Bryennios was defeated, Nikephoros III had him blinded, but granted him and his partisans amnesty. The second revolt came from a supporter of Bryennios, Nikephoros Basilakes the protoproedros, rebelled in Dyrrhachium (modern-day Durrës) in 1078, but he was quickly defeated by Alexios, and similarly blinded. In 1079 the Varangian Guard attempted to murder Nikephoros during an evening inspection, but they were unsuccessful as Nikephoros was able to command his retinue and defend himself until his imperial guards could arrive to defeat the Varangians. Nikephoros had the ringleaders of the plot sent to remote forts and granted amnesty to the rest. Around this time, Michael of Nicomedia, the hypertimos (head of the imperial administration), who may be the same person as Michael Psellos, died in Nicomedia; it is not known if his death was related to the assassination plot of the Varangians.

Around the same time, Michael VII's brother Konstantios Doukas plotted against Nikephoros. Meanwhile, Nikephoros was planning to deal with Byzantine Anatolia, now practically overrun by the Seljuk Turks. Nikephoros hired mercenaries to strengthen his forces, as he viewed his native forces as being too little in number; however, the mercenaries were rowdy and disloyal. At one point Nikephoros had to personally address the mercenaries to attempt to make them cooperate. Konstantios Doukas's rebellion put an end to Nikephoros's eastern campaign, but Nikephoros was popular enough that none outside of the immediate army under Doukas joined him, allowing Nikephoros to quickly assemble an army of levies and his imperial guard to challenge Doukas. Nikephoros quickly sent emissaries to Doukas to inquire why he had rebelled and was able to persuade the soldiers under Doukas to surrender their general through an offer of amnesty; after Doukas was handed over to Nikephoros by his own troops, he was sent into exile at a monastery.

In 1078 the Paulician sect attempted to use the chaos of the rebellions of Bryennios and Basilakes and their growing popularity in the Balkans to rise up against Nikephoros; Leca the Paulician agitated against Nikephoros and attempted to convince the Pechenegs, with whom Basilakes had earlier attempted to ally, to invade Byzantine land. At the same time, Dobromir the Paulician stirred up a revolt in Mesembria, in co-operation with Leca, and began to pillage the surrounding areas. Leca and Dobromir soon abandoned their rebellion after they were informed that Nikephoros was quickly assembling an army to defeat them. Knowing their few loyalists would not be able to confront the Byzantine army, they begged Nikephoros for forgiveness, fearing that they would share the same punishment as Bryennios and Basilakes; Nikephoros showed mercy and granted them amnesty, along with both gifts and titles.

Another problem was the matter of the succession. Maria initially hoped to persuade Nikephoros to restore her son Constantine Doukas to the office of junior emperor and heir which he had held under his father Michael VII, but she was unable to convince him. Robert Guiscard therefore launched an invasion of the Byzantine Empire, using the broken betrothal as a pretext. According to Konstantinos Varzos, Nikephoros originally intended to designate his grandson as his successor under tutelage of the Komnenoi. However, in the end he grew suspicious of their ambitions and instead chose his nephew, Nikephoros Synadenos, of whom almost nothing is known other than that he later married a niece of Alexios. Maria and the Doukas family were dissatisfied with this decision, and secretly formed an alliance with Alexios and the rest of the Komnenos family.

Norman Duke Robert Guiscard of Apulia prepared to invade the Byzantine Empire in 1081 under the pretext of defending the succession of Constantine Doukas, who had been engaged to Robert's daughter Helena; at the same time, the Seljuks captured the town of Cyzicus. Alexios was entrusted with a substantial army to defeat the Norman threat but conspired with his relative John Doukas to instead take the throne for himself. Alexios raised a rebellion against Nikephoros and was able to quickly surround Constantinople and put it to siege due to the lack of a defensive army. Nikeophoros was unable to secure the support of either the Seljuk Turks or Nikephoros Melissenos, his traditional rivals, and thus was forced to prepare to abdicate. Nikephoros decided that his only choice was to abdicate in favor of Melissenos, who was nearby in Damalis in Anatolia, and sent messengers to him across the Bosphorus; however, these messengers were intercepted by George Palaiologos, a general of Alexios, who persuaded them to support Alexios. Alexios and his forces broke through the walls of Constantinople on 1 April 1081 and sacked the city; Patriarch Cosmas convinced Nikephoros to abdicate to Alexios rather than prolong the civil war. Nikephoros then fled to the Hagia Sophia and sought sanctuary inside of it. Michael, the future logothete of Alexios, then escorted Nikephoros to the Monastery of Peribleptus, where he abdicated and became a monk. He died later that year. Daniel Maynard comments that both Anthony Kaldellis and João Vicente de Medeiros Publio Dias tend to characterize Nikephoros's reign as part of the Doukas dynasty, with Kaldellis stating that "Botaniates' reign was basically an extension of the Ducas dynasty", and de Medeiros Publio Dias stating that "His government is normally only seen as a prelude to the important, but at the same time controversial rule of Alexios I Komnenos".

==== Reforms and domestic policy ====
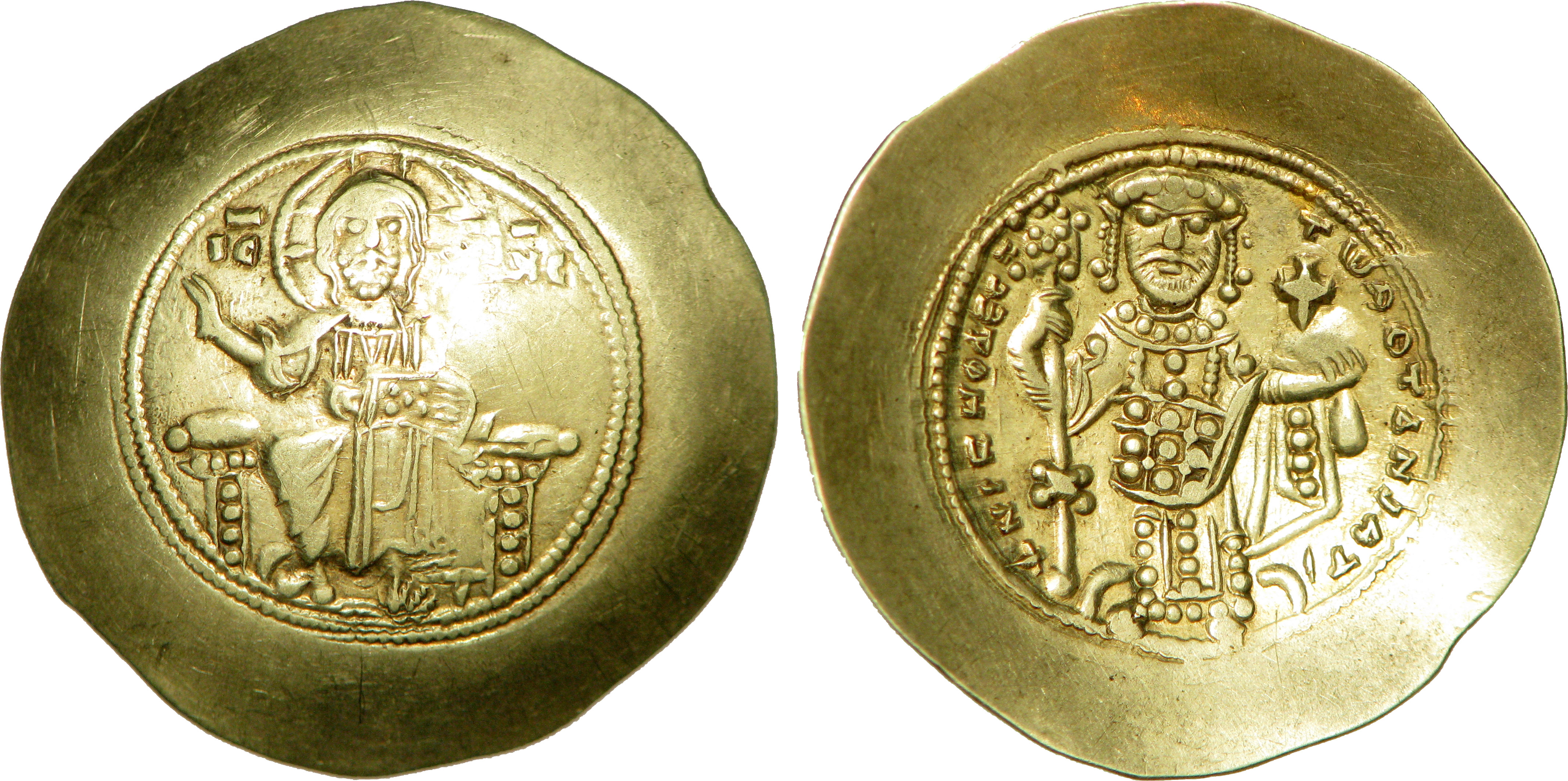
A gold coin bearing Nikephoros III's image (right) and Christ Pantocrator (left)

Nikephoros performed many acts to secure the support of the Byzantine populace, as he lacked the legitimacy of imperial succession as a usurper. He spent large amounts of money on donatives for his army and supporters, which severely sapped the imperial treasury, and distributed many titles to them; he also donated generously to charities. He returned the gold and silver ornaments that Michael VII had confiscated from the churches to fund his civil war against him. Whether or not these acts managed to gain the support of the people cannot be ascertained, as Nikephoros's reign was filled with revolts and political uncertainty; however, it can be assumed that he was determined to prevent the betrayal which many previous emperors had suffered, and as such freely handed out gifts and titles. Many of the reforms which Nikephoros enacted were more likely intended to solidify his tenuous hold on the throne, rather than for the security of the empire.

Nikephoros issued a chrysobull that forgave all debt which was in arrears in order to gain support and to attempt to remedy the debt crisis which had occurred under the Doukas dynasty; he also forbade creditors from demanding debt repayment before the terms of the contract stated, likely to improve the financial stability of the empire by preventing sudden impoverishment, and forbade creditors from seizing the property of their debtors in payment of debt after their debts were canceled. Attaleiates says that these laws "put an end to the fear of debt", which he said had been a source of much suffering for the Byzantine citizens under the Doukas dynasty.

Nikephoros may have revoked the edicts of Michael VII to secure more legitimacy and to reward the citizens of Constantinople who had supported him; one such measure involved the restoration of rights to owners of small jetties around Constantinople, allowing them to again use these ports, called skalai. Attaleiates states that Nikephoros "diligently attended the festivals of the capital and frequently bestowed gifts to his subjects", suggesting that Nikephoros did not hesitate to embrace the trappings of an emperor to ensure that he was viewed as the legitimate emperor rather than a mere usurper. Nikephoros worked to not only gain the favor of the masses, but also the previous dynasty, which Romanos IV had failed to do, leading to his downfall. He brought Eudokia Makrembolitissa out of her monastic exile and allowed her to live among her family, and may have attempted to make Konstantios Doukas his heir, likely in an attempt to appease the civil officials who he had just deposed. Additionally, succession was a strong concern, as Nikephoros was a widower, old, and childless in 1078. His marriage to Maria, the wife of Michael VII, and attempt to take Konstantios as his heir, show Nikephoros's determination to both secure his succession and restore stability to the empire. On the other hand, his refusal to name his stepson Constantine Doukas as heir, and preference for his own relative Synadenos, would later be cited as a factor in his downfall.

Attaleiates praised Nikephoros for his reforms to the legal code and his diligence in the performance of his imperial duties. Nikephoros presided over court cases and in his free time read books to improve his ability to judge cases. Nikephoros settled several pressing legal issues in 1079, first enacting a law regarding spousal insanity, the second increasing the time between sentencing and execution to thirty days to allow new evidence to be presented or the judge to review whether the crime merited capital punishment. Nikephoros also issued a law that extended the same legal rights and protections enjoyed by private servants to imperial servants. While the reforms of Nikephoros are quite minor, they provide insight into Nikephoros's desire to relieve some of the issues plaguing the Byzantine Empire and correct the rampant corruption of the Byzantine courts; that his reforms were quite minor is unsurprising in light of the fact that Nikephoros was nearly eighty and had to suppress several revolts and defend against the Turks in Anatolia.

==== Diplomacy ====
The situation of Byzantine Anatolia worsened after the Battle of Manzikert in 1071, as the Seljuk Turks began to take the Byzantine lands for themselves, rather than simply raid them. Theodore Gabras and Philaretos Brachamios, the governors of Trebizond and Antioch, respectively, had become separated from the rest of the Byzantine Empire as the Turks invaded other regions of Anatolia which were almost undefended, and thus became de facto independent of the Byzantine Empire. Nikephoros negotiated with Philaretos for the submission of his fief in 1078 and granted him the title of doux, leaving him the legitimate ruler of the newly returned Byzantine province. This reincorporation benefited the Byzantine Empire as Philaretos had been attacking some nearby Byzantine towns in order to incorporate them into his domain, dividing the Byzantines' focus upon the Seljuk Turks in the area. This successful negotiation may also have reflected the prestige of the Botaneiates family, as Michael Doukas had failed to negotiate a similar agreement with Philaretos because of Philaretos's dislike of the corrupt Nikephoritzes the Logothete. While a diplomatic victory, it did not effectively change the situation of either party, as Philaretos remained effectively independent, and Nikephoros had little to gain from reasserting control over the land. The only real success to come from it is that he may have gained legitimacy due to achieving something which his predecessor was never able to; that Attaleiates deigns to mention it as one of Nikephoros's successes lends credence to it largely benefiting only Nikephoros's legitimacy.

== Notes ==
Nikephoros III Botaneiates non-dynastical Born: c. 1002 Died: c. 1081
Regnal titles
Preceded by Michael VII	Byzantine emperor 7 January 1078 – 1 April 1081	Succeeded by Alexios I
Military offices
Preceded by Nikephoritzes	Doux of Antioch; 1067–1068	Succeeded by Peter Libellisios
