= Constantine Arianites =

Byzantine general (died 1050)

Constantine Arianites (Greek: Κωνσταντῖνος Ἀριανίτης; died 1050) was a Byzantine general active in the Balkans against the Pechenegs.

== Life ==
He was possibly the son or otherwise a relative of David Arianites, a celebrated general under Basil II (r. 976–1025). He is first recorded in 1047, when the Pechenegs crossed the Danube and invaded Byzantine territory. At the time, according to John Skylitzes, he held the rank of magistros and the post of doux of Adrianople. In response to the Pecheneg attack, he was ordered to join with the officer commanding in Bulgaria, Basil Monachos, and the generals Michael and Kegenes (a baptised Pecheneg who had entered Byzantine service). The Byzantines managed to defeat and capture the Pechenegs, but instead of exterminating them, they were settled as colonists in the desolate plains of Moesia.

When the Pechenegs rebelled in 1049, Arianites was a senior officer in the army. When they began to pillage the area around Adrianople, he defeated a few small Pecheneg units on his way to Dampolis, but was himself defeated when he engaged the main body. He retreated to Andrianople, from where he informed the emperor of the rebellion.

In the spring of 1050, Arianites was sent under the hetaireiarches Constantine to crash the revolt, but due to an ill-advised attack by a part of the Byzantine army led by Samuel Bourtzes, which left its fortified encampment to charge the Pechenegs on open field, the Byzantines suffered a defeat at Basilike Libas near Adrianople. Arianites received a heavy wound by a javelin in the intestines and died two days after the battle, while another senior commander, Michael Dokeianos, was captured and killed by the Pechenegs. According to Rodolphe Guilland, he probably held the post of Domestic of the Schools of the West at that time.

== Sources ==
- Guilland, Rodolphe (1967). "Le Domestique des Scholes". Recherches sur les institutions byzantines, Tome I (in French). Berlin: Akademie-Verlag. pp. 426–468.
- Kaldellis, Anthony; Krallis, Dimitris, eds. (2012). The History - Michael Attaleiates. Cambridge, Mass.: Harvard University Press. ISBN 978-0-674-05799-9.
- Paroń, Aleksander (2021). The Pechenegs: Nomads in the Political and Cultural Landscape of Medieval Europe. Translated by Anessi, Thomas. Leiden, Boston: Brill. ISBN 978-90-04-44109-5.
- Wortley, John, ed. (2010). John Skylitzes: A Synopsis of Byzantine History, 811–1057. Cambridge: Cambridge University Press. ISBN 978-0-521-76705-7.
