= Arianites (ammonite) =

Scientific classification
- Domain: Eukaryota
- Kingdom: Animalia
- Phylum: Mollusca
- Class: Cephalopoda
- Subclass: †Ammonoidea
- Order: †Ceratitida
- Superfamily: †Ceratitoidea
- Family: †Columbitidae
- Genus: †Arianites

Genus of molluscs (fossil)

Arianites is an extinct genus of cephalopods belonging to the ammonite subclass.
