= Nikephoros Basilakes =

Late 11th-century Byzantine Empire usurper

- Usurper of the Byzantine Empire
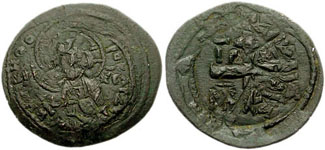
- Follis struck by Basilakes during his brief usurpation
- Reign: 1078
- Predecessor: Michael VII
- Successor: Nikephoros III
- Born: ?
- Died: ?
- Father: Phloros Basilakes

Nikephoros Basilakes (Greek: Νικηφόρος Βασιλάκης), frequently encountered simply as Basilakios (Βασιλάκιος), Latinized as Nicephorus Basilacius, was a Byzantine general and aristocrat of the late 11th century, who in 1078 tried to overthrow the Emperor Nikephoros III Botaneiates and was defeated by Alexios Komnenos. Nikephoros is described as the most illustrious member of his family. His father was named Phloros, and his brother was Manuel Basilakes.

During the campaigns of Emperor Romanos IV Diogenes preceding the Battle of Mantzikert, Nikephoros Basilakes served as doux of Theodosioupolis, and was captured by the enemy after pursuing a retreating Turkish band too far, in 1068. Under Michael VII Doukas, Nikephoros Basilakes was posted to Paphlagonia and subsequently made doux of Dyrrachion. In the collapse of the regime of Michael VII Doukas, Nikephoros Basilakes, still doux of Dyrrachion, began to plan a revolt as early as the summer of 1077, initially as a supporter of Nikephoros Bryennios, but it was only in the spring of 1078 that he decided that his time had arrived. Supported by his brother Manuel, Gymnos, Tessarakontapekhys, Gregory Mesemerios, all military commanders, and by Theodore, Bishop of Deabolis, Nikephoros moved into position at Thessalonica, awaiting the outcome of the clash between two other claimants to the throne, Nikephoros III Botaneiates and Nikephoros Bryennios, in order that he might quickly crush the exhausted victor.

Following Nikephoros III's triumph, Nikephoros Basilakes prepared to oppose him with forces consisted of veteran Roman, Bulgarian, and Albanian soldiers, as well as Frankish (Italian), Varangian, and Pecheneg mercenaries, and his confidence in his own abilities and courage convinced him that victory would easily be his. Nikephoros III sent his best general, Alexios Komnenos, to deal with the rebel. Nikephoros Basilakes attacked Alexios at night, hoping to catch him off guard, but the plan had been betrayed. Alexios managed outwitted Basilakes and ambushed him, on the banks of the Vardar River, some eighteen miles distant from Thessalonica. Defeated, Basilakes fled to Thessalonica where he attempted to defend the city, but was seized by his own soldiers and delivered to Nikephoros III who ordered that Basilakes be blinded. The attempted usurpation of Nikephoros Basilakes was thus suppressed, in the summer of 1078.

== Sources ==
- Cheynet, J.-C., Pouvoir et contestations à Byzance (963-1210), Paris, 1996.
- George Finlay, History of the Byzantine and Greek Empires from 1057 - 1453, Volume 2, William Blackwood & Sons, 1854
- Kaldellis, A., Streams of Gold, Rivers of Blood: the Rise and Fall of Byzantium, 955 A.D. to the First Crusade, Oxford, 2017.
- Kazhdan, Alexander, ed. (1991). The Oxford Dictionary of Byzantium. Oxford and New York: Oxford University Press. ISBN 0-19-504652-8.
- Skoulatos, Basile (1980). Les personnages byzantins de l'Alexiade: Analyse prosopographique et synthèse [The Byzantine Personalities of the Alexiad: Prosopographical Analysis and Synthesis] (in French). Louvain-la-Neuve and Louvain: Bureau du Recueil Collège Érasme and Éditions Nauwelaerts.
