= Tyrach =

Pecheneg chieftain

Tyrach, Pecheneg chieftain in 1048, also known as Tirakh or Tirek, whose quarrel with his military commander Ioannes Kegen led to the Pecheneg revolt of 1048–1053. Kegen and his followers relocated to Paristrion. With the blessing of emperor Constantine IX Manomachos, Kegen was to protect a sector of the empire from invasion, but continued to harass Tyrach. Tyrach responded by a massive invasion of Byzantium, but, once defeated, was allowed to keep his army to aid in defending the empire against Seljuk incursions. Tyrach instead turned to rebellion and was arrested. Kegen was sent to replace him, but upon rumors of insurrection, he was also arrested. The emperor again turned to Tyrach to lead the Pecheneg, but instead rebelled and was defeated at a decisive battle at Adrianople in 1050 where he presumably died.
