= Pecheneg revolt =

11th Century uprising against the Byzantine Empire

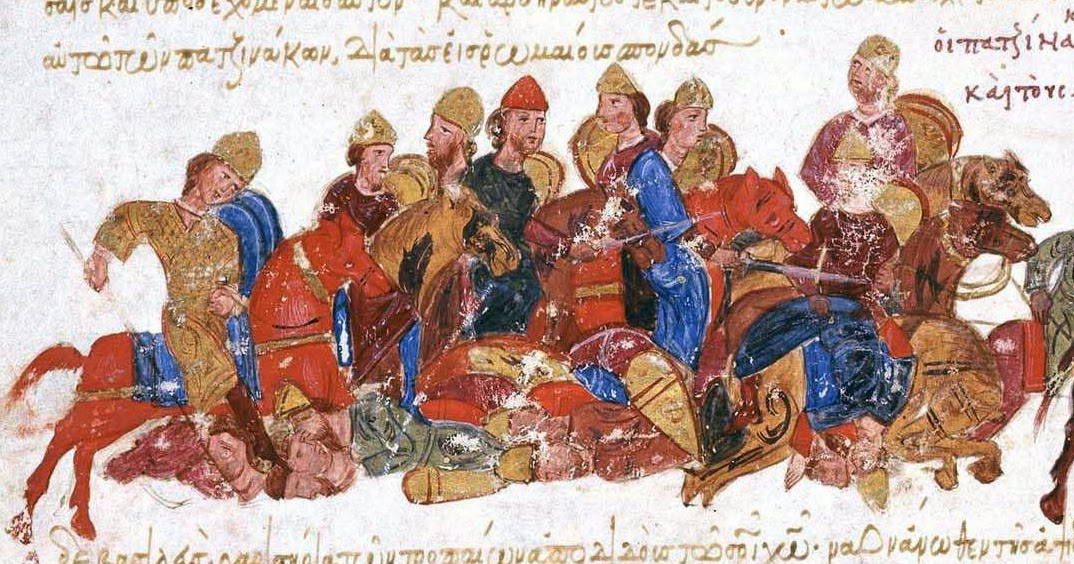
- The Pechenegs defeating the Rus, from the Madrid Skylitzes
Date	1049 – 1053
Location	Thrace and Macedonia, Byzantine Empire
Result	Negotiated settlement

Belligerents
Byzantine Empire	Pechenegs

Commanders and leaders
Constantine IX Monomachos; Constantine Arianites (DOW); Katakalon Kekaumenos (WIA); Hervé Frankopoulos; Constantine/Nikephoros (rhaiktor); Constantine (hetaireiarches); Samuel Bourtzes; Michael Dokeianos †; Niketas Glabas; Basil †; Demetrios Katakalon; Michael Akolouthos; Bryennios; Nikephoros Botaneiates	Tyrach; Soultzous †; Selte; Karaman; Kataleim

Strength
Unknown	15,000 in 1049, many more as the war went on

Casualties and losses
Unknown	Unknown

The Pecheneg revolt was an uprising of the Pechenegs against the Byzantine Empire, which lasted from 1049 to 1053.

== Background ==
In early 1049, the Byzantine emperor Constantine IX Monomachos decided to transfer 15,000 Pecheneg warriors, from the 100,000 Pechenegs that had migrated into the region, from their positions in the Balkans to the eastern front. Upon approaching the Bosporus, however, they decided to turn back, and slowly marched through Bulgaria until they reached the Byzantine city of Serdica. They were soon joined by the followers of the Pecheneg warlord Tyrach, who was imprisoned in Constantinople, and the former Pecheneg tribal leader Kegen, and raised the banner of revolt.

== Revolt ==
=== Dampolis ===
The Pecheneg army soon began to plunder the area around Adrianople. The local doux Constantine Arianites defeated a few small Pecheneg units on his way to Dampolis, but was soundly defeated when he engaged the main body and retreated to Adrianople, from where he informed the emperor. Soon, Constantine IX decided to release Tyrach from prison on the condition that he pacify his followers. Predictably, he joined them instead. The emperor soon brought his eastern armies to the west, but they, under the command of the doux of the East Katakalon Kekaumenos, rhaiktor Constantine (or Nikephoros) and Hervé Frankopoulos, were soundly defeated, and Kekaumenos was severely injured. At this point the Pechenegs were able to raid across Macedonia and Thrace with impunity.

=== Adrianople ===
In the spring of 1050, another army was mobilised, led by the Arab eunuch and hetaireiarches Constantine, who gathered forces from both the western and eastern tagmata. He set camp near Andrianople and built strong fortifications. While senior military officers were holding a meeting in the hetaireiarches' tent, the patrician and commander of the infantry, Samuel Bourtzes, left the fortifications with his troops and attacked the Pechenegs without waiting for Constantine's signal. As a result, the entire army was drawn into a battle with the Pechenegs, was defeated and retreated behind the fortifications. At that point, the Pechenegs attempted to storm the camp, but one of their leaders named Soultzous was killed and a regiment from the Scholae under protospatharios Niketas Glabas came to reinforce the Byzantines. The Pechenegs soon withdrew after learning that more reinforcements were coming under the former synkellos and doux of Bulgaria, Basil. The Byzantines did not suffer great losses, but Constantine Arianites died because of his wounds, and a veteran commander from Italy, Michael Dokeianos, was taken prisoner, and after managing to kill a Pecheneg chief, was torn apart.

=== Arcadiopolis and Rentakion ===
The Pechenegs renewed their attacks in late 1050 or early 1051, with a very large force, described as "innumerable" by Michael Attaleiates, invading Thrace. An unnamed Byzantine commander was dispatched against them by the Emperor, meeting the Pechenegs in a pitched battle at Arcadiopolis. Stephenson suggests this commander may be identified with the Katepan of Paradounavon, Demetrios Katakalon, to whom a number of seals are attested from this period. The Pechenegs resisted fiercely, but were ultimately broken by the attack of the Byzantine cavalry, which conducted a vigorous pursuit that dealt severe losses to the defeated nomads. The Pechenegs then regrouped at Rentakion, where a separate raiding column reinforced them, and met the Byzantines in a second battle. The Pechenegs were defeated once again, with their scattered warriors escaping into nearby forests and valleys.

=== Goloe, Toplitzos and Charioupolis ===
With the nomads driven back from Thrace, the emperor adopted new tactics, in order to engage the Pecheneg contingents which were raiding other provinces. He organized the formation of multiple counter-guerrilla units, largely made up of Varangians, Franks and other Westerners under the commander Bryennios and the Varangian captain Michael Akolouthos, in order to counter the Pechenegs with their own tactics. For three years the Byzantine guerrillas fought successfully against the Pechenegs. They defeated them in Goloe and in their encampment at Toplitzos and even annihilated a sizable contingent close to Charioupolis.

=== Zygos Pass ===
As these victories and further successes pushed the Pechenegs back, by 1053 the land South of Haemus was secured and Constantine IX was able to organize another regular army. This force, under the command of Michael Akolouthos and the doux Basil, marched against the Pecheneg encampment near Preslav and besieged it. However, the Pechenegs withstood behind their palisade, and when the Byzantine army began to run short of supplies, its leadership decided to abandon the siege and withdraw. Exploiting this, the Pechenegs under Tyrach marched out, managing to circumvent the Byzantines and prepare an ambush for them along their route of march at the Zygos Pass. The Byzantines were defeated with severe losses, however a large number of their cavalry were saved due to the actions of one of the Byzantine commanders, Nikephoros Botaneiates. He rallied these horsemen and fought his way out of the trap with them. Maintaining a tight formation to defend against attacks from the Pecheneg horse archers, he led these soldiers in a 12-day fighting retreat towards Adrianople. During the course of the retreat, the Pechenegs launched several attacks to break the Byzantines, but these were repulsed with heavy losses by Nikephoros' men, who reached the safety of the city.

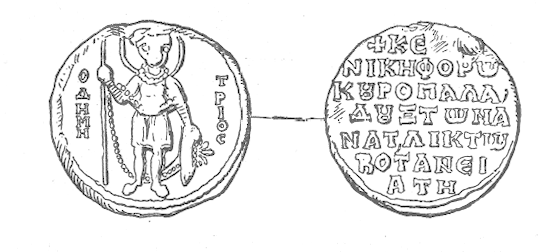
Seal of Nikephoros Botaneiates as kouropalates and doux of the Anatolic Theme

=== Negotiated settlement ===
Following this failed campaign, Constantine intended to organise another expedition, but as the Pechenegs were exhausted after years of fighting and massive losses, they initiated negotiations. A peace treaty was signed, where the Pechenegs were forced to cede all of their conquests to the Byzantines, likely in exchange for some form of autonomy.

== Aftermath ==
In the summer of 1059, during the reign of Isaac Komnenos, the Pechenegs revolted again with support from the Kingdom of Hungary, which was at war with the Byzantines. After peace was restored at Serdica, most of the Pechenegs stopped fighting and submitted to Issac, except for the chief and veteran of the previous revolt, Selte, who continued to fight in a position in the lower Danube, until his seat was destroyed and he was captured by imperial forces.

== Sources ==
- Kaldellis, Anthony; Krallis, Dimitris, eds. (2012). The History - Michael Attaleiates. Cambridge, Mass.: Harvard University Press. ISBN 978-0-674-05799-9.
- Paroń, Aleksander (2021). The Pechenegs: Nomads in the Political and Cultural Landscape of Medieval Europe. Translated by Anessi, Thomas. Leiden, Boston: Brill. ISBN 978-90-04-44109-5.
- Kaldellis, Anthony (2017). Streams of Gold, Rivers of Blood: The Rise and Fall of Byzantium, 955 A.D. to the First Crusade. Oxford University Press. ISBN 978-0190253226.
- Wortley, John, ed. (2010). John Skylitzes: A Synopsis of Byzantine History, 811–1057. Cambridge: Cambridge University Press. ISBN 978-0-521-76705-7.
- Stephenson, Paul (2008). Byzantium's Balkan Frontier: A Political Study of the Northern Balkans, 900-1204. Cambridge University Press. ISBN 978-0190253226.
- Brunet de Presle, Wladimir; Bekker, Immanuel, eds. (1853). Corpus scriptorum historiae Byzantinae: Michaelis Attaliotae historia (in Ancient Greek and Latin). Weber.
- Maynard, Daniel (2021). The Last Bringer of Victory: Nikephoros III Botaneiates AD1078-1081.
