= Ioannes Kegen =

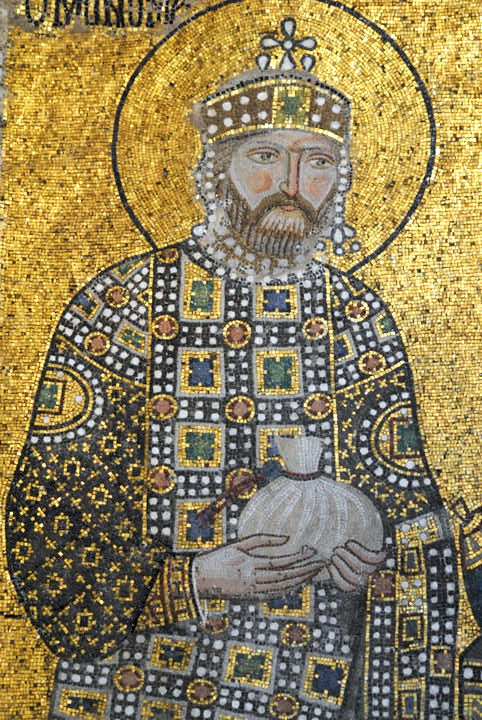
Emperor Constantine IX Monomachos

Ioannes Kegen was a Pecheneg military commander who served under khan Tyrach in 1048, whose quarrel led to the Pecheneg revolt of 1048–1053. Kegen and his followers took refuge in Paristrion and appealed to Byzantine emperor Constantine IX Monomachos for help. His appeal was warmly accepted, resulting in him being named patrician, converting to Christianity and his tribe getting recognized as foederati. Kegen was to protect a sector of the empire from invasion, but continued to harass Tyrach. Tyrach responded by a massive invasion of Byzantium, but, once defeated, was allowed to keep his army to aid in defending the empire against Seljuk incursions. Tyrach instead turned to rebellion and was arrested. Kegen was sent to replace him, but upon rumors of insurrection, he was also arrested. The emperor again turned to Tyrach to lead the Pechenegs, but instead Tyrach rebelled and was defeated at a decisive battle at Adrianople in 1050. Kegen was sent by the emperor as an emissary to the Pechenegs, but was killed as a traitor.
