= Vestes =

Court title during the Byzantine Empire

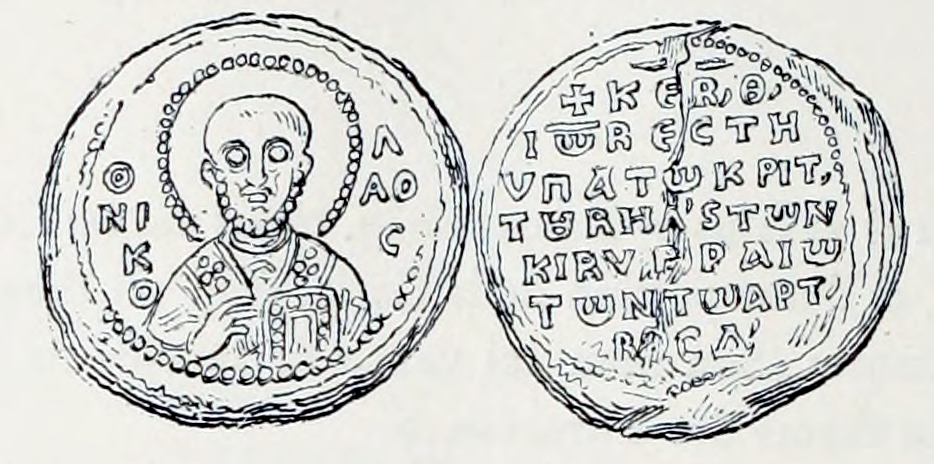
Seal of John Artabasdos, vestes, hypatos, krites of the velon and of the Cibyrrhaeots

Vestes (Greek: βέστης) was a Byzantine court title used in the 10th and 11th centuries.

The term is etymologically connected to the vestiarion, the imperial wardrobe, but despite earlier attempts to connect the vestai and the related title of vestarches, the head of the class of the vestai, with the officials of the vestiarion, no such relation appears to have existed.

The title is first attested for the reign of Emperor John I Tzimiskes (r. 969–976), when it was held by Nikephoros Phokas, son of the kouropalates Leo Phokas. The title remained high in the Byzantine imperial hierarchy throughout most of the 11th century, being often combined with the title of magistros and awarded to prominent generals, among others Isaac Komnenos (emperor in 1057–1059) when he was stratopedarches of the East, Leo Tornikios and Nikephoros Botaneiates (emperor in 1078–1081) during his tenure as doux of Edessa and Antioch. The Escorial Taktikon, a list of offices and court titles and their precedence compiled in the 970s, distinguishes between "bearded" (barbatoi) vestai, who also held the titles of patrikios or magistros, and the eunuch (ektomiai) vestai, who held the title of praipositos.

As with other titles of the middle Byzantine period, the prestige of vestes declined towards the end of the 11th century, when it is attested as being held by lower-ranking officials. To counter this devaluation, the superior title of protovestes (Greek: πρωτοβέστης, 'first vestes') appeared at the same time. Both titles, however, do not appear to have survived the reign of Emperor Alexios I Komnenos (r. 1081–1118).

== Sources ==
- Bréhier, Louis (2000) [1949]. Les Institutions de l'Empire Byzantin (in French). Paris: Albin Michel. ISBN 978-2-226-04722-9.
- Kazhdan, Alexander (1991). "Vestes". In Kazhdan, Alexander (ed.). The Oxford Dictionary of Byzantium. Oxford and New York: Oxford University Press. p. 2162. ISBN 0-19-504652-8.
- McGeer, Eric; Nesbitt, John; Oikonomides, Nicolas, eds. (2005). Catalogue of Byzantine Seals at Dumbarton Oaks and in the Fogg Museum of Art, Volume 5: The East (continued), Constantinople and Environs, Unknown Locations, Addenda, Uncertain Readings. Washington, DC: Dumbarton Oaks Research Library and Collection. ISBN 0-88402-309-5.
- Oikonomides, Nicolas (1972). Les listes de préséance byzantines des IXe et Xe siècles (in French). Paris: Editions du Centre National de la Recherche Scientifique.
