= Magister officiorum =

Senior administrative officials in the Roman Empire

The magister officiorum (Latin; lit. 'Master of Offices'; Greek: μάγιστρος τῶν ὀφφικίων, romanized: magistros tōn offikiōn) was one of the most senior administrative officials in the Later Roman Empire and the early centuries of the Byzantine Empire. In Byzantium, the office was eventually transformed into a senior honorary rank, simply called magistros (μάγιστρος), until it disappeared in the 12th century.

== History and functions ==
=== Late Roman Empire ===
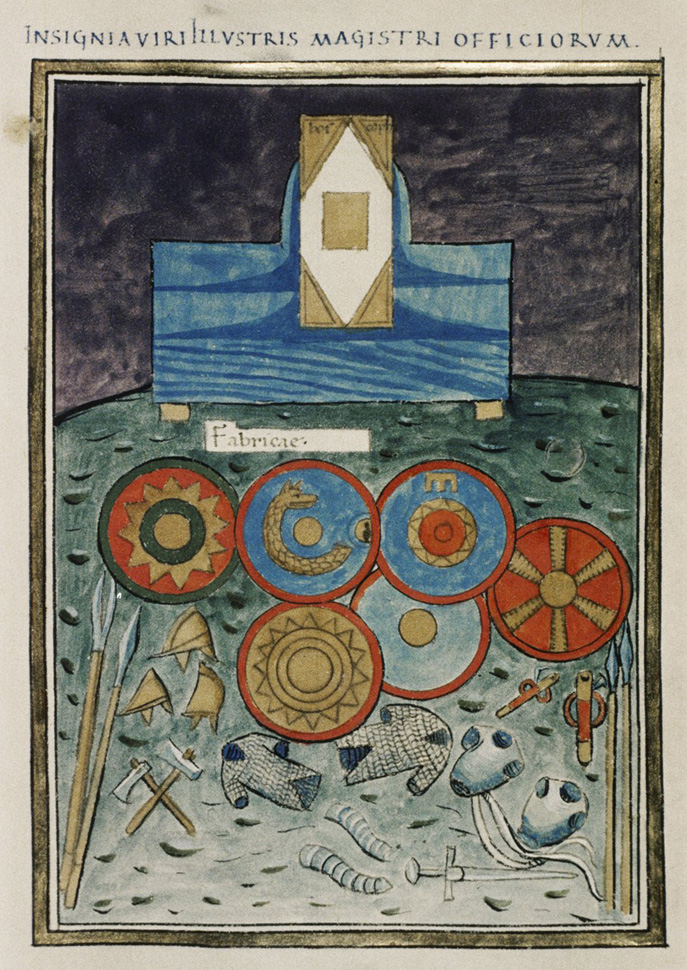
The insignia of the Eastern magister officiorum as displayed in the Notitia Dignitatum: the codicil of his office on a stand, shields with the emblems of the Scholae regiments, and assorted arms and armour attesting the office's control of the imperial arsenals.

Although some scholars have supported its creation under Emperor Diocletian (r. 284–305), the office can first be definitely traced to the year 320, during the reign of Roman emperor Constantine the Great (r. 306–337), but was probably created sometime soon after 312–13, probably as part of an effort to limit the power of the praetorian prefect (praefectus praetorio) the Roman emperor's chief administrative official.

The magister was first given command of the palace guard, the Scholae Palatinae. He was also appointed head of the palatine secretariats, divided into four bureaux, the sacra scrinia, each under a respective magister: the scrinium memoriae, the scrinium epistularum, the scrinium libellorum and the scrinium epistolarum Graecarum. The first bureau handled imperial decisions called annotationes, because they were notes made by the emperor on documents presented to him, and also handled replies to petitions to the emperor. The second handled correspondence with foreign potentates and with the provincial administration and the cities, the third dealt with appeals from lower courts and petitions from those involved in them, and the fourth handled the documents issued in Greek and the translation of Latin documents into Greek. Constantine also transferred the supervision of the agentes in rebus, a corps of trusted messengers who also functioned in a bureaucratic role as monitors of the imperial administration, to the magister. Control of the feared agentes, or magistriani as they were also known, gave the office great power.

The office rose quickly in importance: initially ranked as a regimental commander, tribunus, by the end of Constantine's reign the magister was a comes and member of the imperial consistorium was one of the top four palatine officials (along with the quaestor sacri palatii, comes rerum privatarum and comes sacrarum largitionum). In order of precedence in 372 they ranked in the highest of senatorial ranks, illustres, behind the prefects, urban prefects and highest generals.

The magister became a kind of "Minister of Internal Security, Administrative Oversight and Communications". The holders of the office were the emperor's chief watchdogs. Almost all routine business was channeled to the office of the magister through the secretariats from other ministries such as the prefectures, the Treasury ('res summa, from 319 the Sacrae Largitions,') and the Crown Estates ('res privata'), though higher officials and military officers always had the right and duty to communicate with the emperors if the matter was important enough.

In a move that further strengthened the authority and power of the magister, sometime in the early 340s he was made inspector-general of the cursus publicus, the State Post. (Note: A. E. R. Boak and James E. Dunlap date the change of the jurisdiction to the magister officiorum to Constantius II, as does A. H. M. Jones; Gianfranco Purpura agrees with E. Stein and Blum that the reassignment took place sometime between 341–346; but William G. Sinnigen dates it to the reign of Constantine, citing Codex Theodosianus, 1, 6, 8 in support.) Perhaps at the same time, senior agentes were appointed as heads (Principes) of the staffs of the most important provincial governors: the praetorian prefects, the vicars of the dioceses, and the proconsuls of the provinces of Africa and Achaea. The placements gave the magister, and by extension the emperor, on-the-spot "watchdogs" over the upper echelons of the administration, as the princeps was a key position: his role was to control the staff, not to do paperwork; he composed confidential reports directly for the magister officiorum, without the praetorian prefect's involvement, and vetted all business coming in and going out of the office and countersigned all documents. A law of 387 forbids the legal staffs of the prefects and vicars from instituting legal proceedings without the princeps's permission or order, as an additional means of determining the validity of a legal suit.

The office's powers were further enhanced in the eastern (or Byzantine) half of the Empire in 395, when Emperor Arcadius (r. 395–408) stripped the Praetorian Prefecture of the East of some of its jurisdiction over the cursus publicus, the palace guard (Scholae Palatinae) and the imperial arsenals (fabricae) and handed them to the magister officiorum. These last changes are reflected in the Notitia Dignitatum, a list of all offices compiled c. 400. In the year 443 the eastern magister was made inspector-general of the border army units or limitanei and was ordered to bring them up to full strength and effectiveness.

In the course of time, the office also took over the coordination of foreign affairs (already in the late 4th century, the official translators and interpreters were under the control of the magister officiorum for this reason), and in the East, the Notitia records the presence of four secretaries in charge of the so-called Bureau of Barbarians under the magister's supervision. One of the most important incumbents of this office was Peter the Patrician, who held the position from 539 to 565 and undertook numerous diplomatic missions in this role for Emperor Justinian I (r. 527–565). The office was also retained in Ostrogothic Italy after the fall of the Western Roman Empire, and was held by eminent Roman senators such as Boethius and Cassiodorus.

=== Byzantine Empire ===
The office survived as a bureaucratic function in the eastern half of the Roman Empire, but during the late 7th or the 8th century, most of the office's administrative functions were removed, and it was converted into the dignity of magistros (Greek: μάγιστρος, female form magistrissa, μαγίστρισσα). At least until the time of Emperor Leo VI the Wise (r. 886–912), however, the full former title was remembered: his powerful father-in-law, Stylianos Zaoutzes, is recorded once again as "master of the divine offices" (μάγιστρος τῶν θείων ὀφφικίων). In his administrative functions, the magister officiorum was replaced chiefly by the logothetēs tou dromou, who supervised the Public Post and foreign affairs, while the imperial bodyguard was transformed into the tagmata.

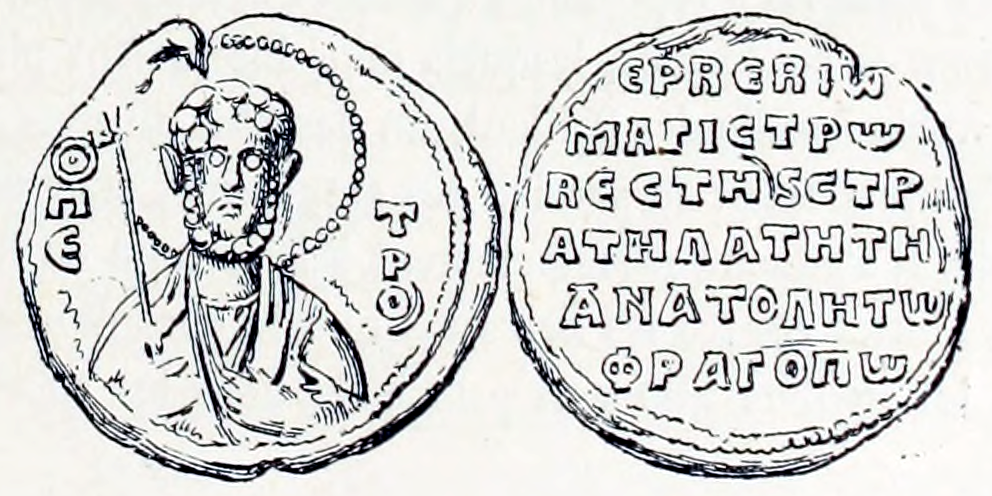
Seal of the magistros, vestēs, and stratēlatēs of the East Hervé Frankopoulos

Until the reign of Emperor Michael III (r. 842–867) there seem to have been only two magistroi, the senior of whom was termed prōtomagistros (πρωτομάγιστρος, "first magistros"), and who was again one of the senior ministers of the state (without specific functions) and head of the Byzantine Senate. From the reign of Michael III on, the title was conferred on more holders, effectively becoming a court rank, the highest in the Byzantine hierarchy until the introduction of the proedros in the mid-10th century. The List of Precedence (Klētorologion) of Philotheos, written in 899, implies the existence of 12 magistroi, while during the reign of Emperor Nikephoros II Phokas (r. 963–969), the western envoy Liutprand of Cremona recorded the presence of 24. The rank continued in existence thereafter, but lost increasingly in importance. In the late 10th and 11th centuries, it was often held in combination with the title of vestēs. From the late 11th century it was considerably devalued, especially in the Komnenian period, and disappeared entirely by the mid-12th century.

== Sources ==
- Boak, A. E. R.; Dunlap, J. E. (1924). The Office of the Grand Chamberlain in the Later Roman and Byzantine Empires. Two Studies in Later Roman and Byzantine Administration. New York and London: Macmillan.
- Bury, John Bagnell (1911). The Imperial Administrative System of the Ninth Century - With a Revised Text of the Kletorologion of Philotheos. London: Oxford University Press.
- Jones, A. H. M. (1964). The Later Roman Empire, 284–602: A Social, Economic and Administrative Survey. Oxford: Basil Blackwell.
- Kazhdan, Alexander, ed. (1991). The Oxford Dictionary of Byzantium. Oxford and New York: Oxford University Press. ISBN 0-19-504652-8.
- Kelly, Christopher (2004). Ruling the Later Roman Empire. Cambridge, Massachusetts: Harvard University Press. ISBN 978-0-67-401564-7.
- Kelly, Christopher (2006). "Bureaucracy and Government". In Lenski, Noel Emmanuel (ed.). The Cambridge Companion to the Age of Constantine. Cambridge: Cambridge University Press. ISBN 978-0-52-152157-4.
- Martindale, John R., ed. (1980). The Prosopography of the Later Roman Empire: Volume II, AD 395–527. Cambridge: Cambridge University Press. ISBN 0-521-20159-4.
- Potter, David S. (2004). The Roman Empire at Bay, AD 180-395. London and New York: Routledge. ISBN 0-415-10057-7.
- Purpura, Gianfranco (1973). "I curiosi e la schola agentum in rebus" (PDF). Annali del Seminario Giuridico dell'Università di Palermo. XXXIV: 165–275.
- Sinnigen, William G. (1962). "Three Administrative Changes ascribed to Constantius II". The American Journal of Philology. 83 (4): 369–382. doi:10.2307/292919. JSTOR 292919.
- Tougher, Shaun (1997). The Reign of Leo VI (886-912): Politics and People. Leiden; New York; Köln: Brill. ISBN 9004108114.
