= Olympias (daughter of Robert Guiscard) =

Daughter of Norman duke of Apulia

Start of a copy of the chrysobull by which Michael VII agreed to the marriage of Olympias to his son Constantine, August 1074. This copy is found in a 15th-century codex of Psellos' works.

Helena, born Olympias, was a daughter of the Norman duke of Apulia, Robert Guiscard, and the Lombard noblewoman Sikelgaita. From 1074 until 1078, she was the fiancée of the Byzantine co-emperor Constantine Doukas.

== Birth name ==
Olympias was the daughter of Robert Guiscard and his second wife, Sichelgaita. Her birth name, also spelled Olimpias, is attested in two sources. According to the late 12th-century Fragmentary Troia Chronicle:

Alexius factus est imperator, et Robertus dux transivit mare, et cepit eum impugnare ob Olimpiadem filiam suam, quam expulearat de palatio suo.

Translation:

Alexius was made emperor, and Duke Robert crossed the sea, and started to attack him on account of Olimpias his daughter, whom he had banished from his palace.

An exultet roll from Bari from around 1075 contains the prayer:

Memorare, domine, famulorum tuorum imperatorum nostrorum domni Michahil et domni Constantini atque domne Olimpiade. Simulque lucidissimi ducis nostri domni Rubberti et domne Sikelgaita ac domni Ruggeri et cunctum exercitum eorum et omnium circumstantium.

Translation:

Remember, Lord, your servants our emperors the Lord Michael and Lord Constantine and the Lady Olimpias. At the same time our most illustrious dukes Lord Robert and Lady Sikelgaita and Lord Roger and their whole army and all around them.

Although none of Guiscard's daughters bore distinctly Norman names, the name Olympias is the most unusual. It is unknown among earlier generations of Normans or Lombards. Although there was a Saint Olympias, she was hardly venerated in the West, even in southern Italy. In the 12th century, the names Orimpia and Limpiasa, both variants of Olympias, do appear in southern Italy. It is most likely, however, that she was named after Olympias, the mother of Alexander the Great, since many references to Alexander are found in south Italian sources of the Norman conquest of southern Italy. She may have been born after the first negotiations for a marriage alliance with the Byzantines took place in 1072, in which case her name may have been chosen to indicate her imperial future. In that case, her birth name and her adopted name (Helena) are parallels.

Olympias has sometimes been identified with Guiscard's daughter who was betrothed to Count Hugh V of Maine, but these must be two different daughters.

== Marriage arrangement ==
Guiscard had several daughters whose marriages he arranged for political advantage around the same time. The initial Norman–Byzantine marriage proposal was made by Emperor Romanos IV around the time the Normans were besieging Bari, which surrendered in April 1071. Romanos offered to marry one of his sons to one of Guiscard's daughters, but his defeat at the battle of Manzikert put an end to discussions. Emperor Michael VII renewed talks, offering to marry his younger brother (Konstantios or Andronikos) to one of Guiscard's daughters in late 1072 or early 1073. Guiscard refused this offer on two occasions. According to Amatus of Montecassino, he was hoping for better terms. In March 1074, he accepted a third offer to marry his daughter Olympias to Michael's son, Constantine. Constantine was probably at that time a newborn.

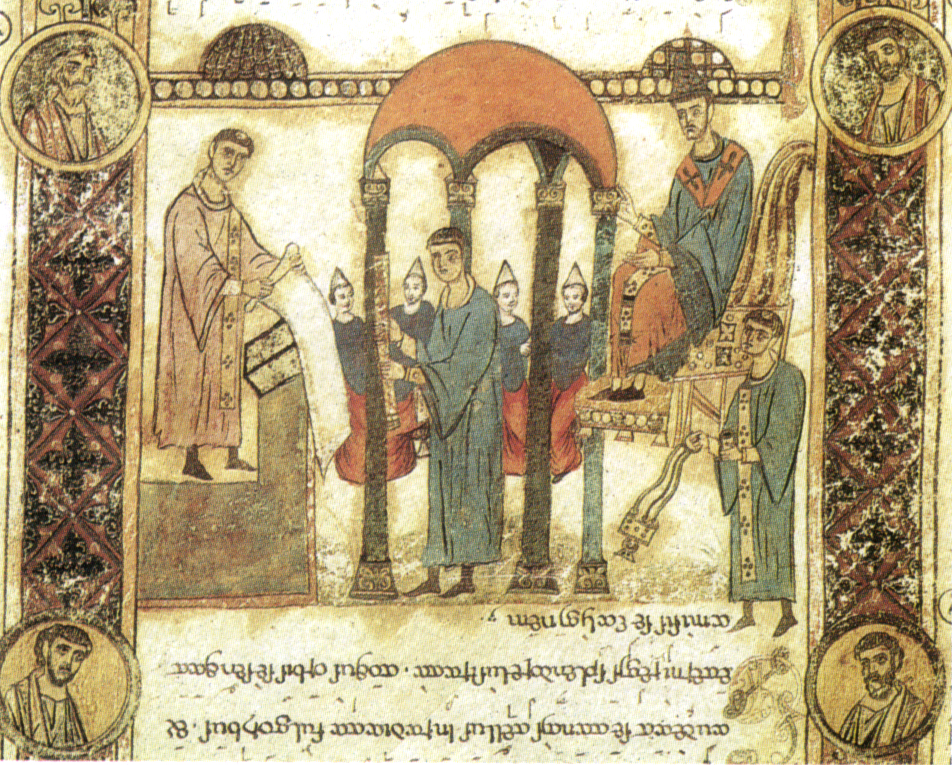
A section from the same exultet roll in which Olympias is the object of a prayer

The marriage contract was ratified in a treaty, in the form of a chrysobull drafted by Michael Psellos, in August 1074. Michael's younger brothers and co-emperors, Konstantios and Andronikos, also signed the marriage contract. Per its terms, Byzantine titles and pensions were granted to Guiscard and his men. Guiscard himself became a nobilissimus and one of his sons a curopalates. The annual value of the pensions was equivalent to about 200 pounds (91 kg) of gold. Olympias would live in the Great Palace of Constantinople and be treated like an empress consort. In return, Guiscard agreed to respect the empire's borders and to assist in their defence, which probably meant that he would procure Norman mercenaries for the emperor. The momentousness of the marriage alliance is indicated by the number of contemporary historians who noted it: Amatus, William of Apulia, Anna Komnene, John Skylitzes, George Kedrenos and John Zonaras.

== Princess and captive in Constantinople ==
Olympias was a very young child at the time of her betrothal. In 1076, she arrived in Constantinople, where, according to the Skylitzes Continuatus, she was renamed Helena (Helene). The combination of names Constantine and Helena—the names of the first Christian emperor and his mother—suggests that there were high expectations for the marriage alliance. Her future father-in-law made a large donation to the abbey of Montecassino about this time, perhaps in recognition of the diplomatic efforts of its abbot, Desiderius, on behalf of the marriage. The marriage, however, never took place. In March 1078, Michael VII was overthrown in a coup d'état and Helena became a hostage of the new emperor, Nikephoros III. It is likely that she was removed from the palace at this time. According to Geoffrey Malaterra, she was considered a threat because if she remarried her new husband might make a claim on the throne.

During the winter of 1080–1081, Guiscard sent envoys to Constantinople in an effort to rescue his daughter and at the same time to sound out an alliance with Alexios Komnenos. Helena had been placed in a convent by Nikephoros. According to the Troia Chronicle, however, it was Alexius who finally expelled Helena from the palace. This may be based on the fact that Alexios arranged the marriage of Constantine to his own daughter, Anna Komnene, in 1083. According to William of Apulia, Alexios treated Helena with honour. According to Orderic Vitalis, who is not entirely believable, she and another daughter of Guiscard were treated by Alexios as his own daughters. Every morning they took part in his levée, one handing him a towel and the other an ivory comb.

Nothing for certain is known of Helena's fate after March 1078. Orderic says that twenty years later she was handed back to her uncle, Count Roger I of Sicily. Alexios' daughter, Anna, in her Alexiad, does not mention her fiancé's first fiancée's fate. She is in fact overtly hostile to Helena, claiming that the child Constantine abhorred his future fiancée from the beginning. In 1080, an impostor claiming to be Michael VII appeared in southern Italy. Using this and his daughter's captivity as a pretext, Guiscard invaded the empire in 1081.

== Bibliography ==
- Bezobrazov, P. V. (1899). "Chrisovul imperatora Michaila VII Duki" [A Chrysobull of Emperor Michael VII Doukas]. Vizantiiskii Vremennik (in Russian). 6: 140–143.
- Bibicou, Hélène (1959–1960). "Une page d'histoire diplomatique de Byzance au Xl^{e} siècle: Michel VII Doukas, Robert Guiscard et la pension de dignitaires". Byzantion. 24–25: 43–75.
- Cowdrey, H. E. J. (1983). The Age of Abbot Desiderius: Montecassino, the Papacy, and the Normans in the Eleventh and Early Twelfth Centuries. Clarendon Press.
- Falkenhausen, Vera von (1982). "Olympias, eine normannische Prinzessin in Konstantinopel". Bisanzio e l'Italia: Raccolta di studi in memoria di Agostino Pertusi. Vita e pensiero. pp. 56–72.
- Loud, Graham A. (2000). The Age of Robert Guiscard: Southern Italy and the Northern Conquest. Pearson.
- McGeer, Eric, ed. (2020). Byzantium in the Time of Troubles: The Continuation of the Chronicle of John Skylitzes (1057–1079). Brill.
- Oldfield, Paul (2021). "The Troia Chronicle and Historiographical Production in Medieval Puglia". Papers of the British School at Rome. FirstView. 90: 1–25. doi:10.1017/S0068246221000234. S2CID 243824617.
- Polemis, Demetrios I. (1968). The Doukai: A Contribution to Byzantine Prosopography. The Athlone Press.
