= Diogenes (Byzantine family) =

Byzantine Greek noble family

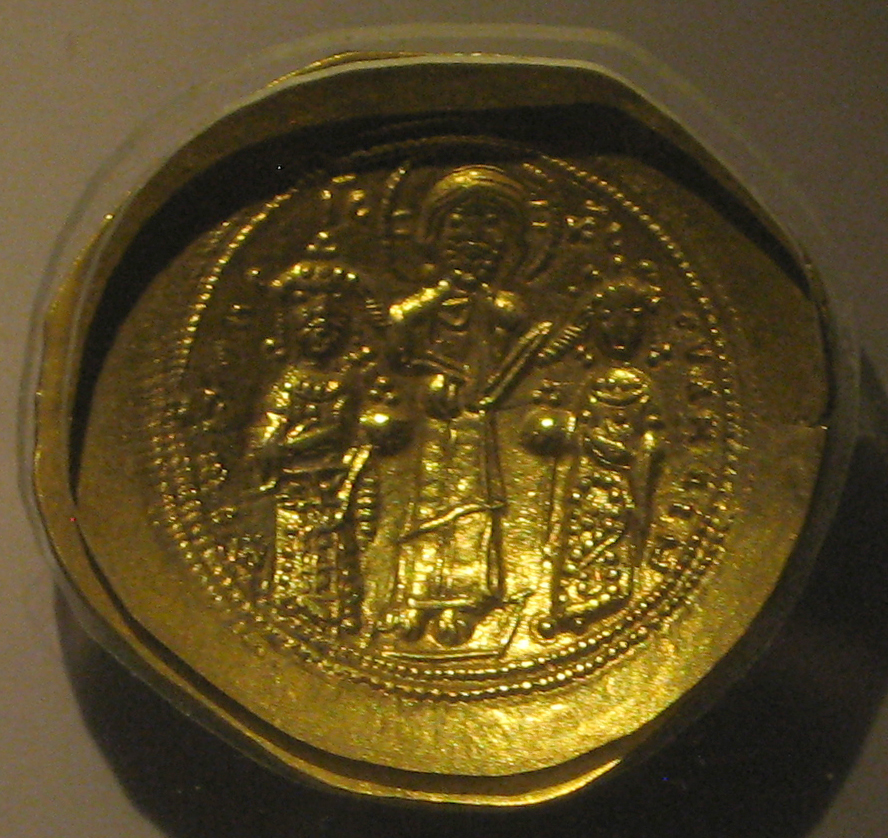
Byzantine coin of Emperor Romanos IV Diogenes

The Diogenes (Greek: Διoγένης, romanized: Diogenēs), (Note: feminine form Diogenissa (Greek: Διογένισσα), plural Diogenai (Διογέναι)) was a Cappadocian Greek noble family of the Byzantine military aristocracy that provided several prominent generals and three emperors during the 10th and 11th century. Romanos IV Diogenes was, by marriage to Eudokia Makrembolitissa, Byzantine Emperor between 1068 and 1071. Romanos led the Byzantine army for the pivotal defeat at the Battle of Manzikert in 1071.

== Members ==
- Adralestos Diogenes (fl. 971), protospatharios and strategos of Morava.
- Constantine Diogenes (d. 1032), strategos and doux
- Romanos IV Diogenes (c. 1030–1072), Byzantine emperor (r. 1068–1071), son of Constantine
- Constantine Diogenes (d. 1073), son of Romanos IV
- Nikephoros Diogenes (c. 1069–after 1094), son of Romanos IV
- Leo Diogenes (c. 1069–1087), son of Romanos IV

== Sources ==
- Norwich, John Julius (1993). Byzantium: The Apogee. London: Penguin. ISBN 978-0-14-011448-5.
- Cheynet, Jean-Claude (2003). "Basil II and Asia Minor". In Magdalino, Paul (ed.). Byzantium in the Year 1000. Brill. doi:10.1163/9789047404095_007. ISBN 9789047404095.
- Frankopan, Peter Doimi De. "Unravelling the Alexiad: Who was ‘Devgenevich’of the Russian Primary Chronicle and ‘Pseudo-Diogenes’ of the Greek sources?." Byzantine and Modern Greek Studies 29.2 (2005): 147-166.
- Günaydın, Törebey. "DİOGENES AİLESİ VE KONSTANTİNOS DİOGENES'İN FAALİYETLERİ." Ankara Üniversitesi Sosyal Bilimler Dergisi 11.2 (2020): 238-243.
