= Nobilissimus =

Title in the Roman and Byzantine empires

- νωβελίσσιμος
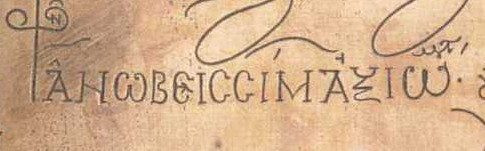
- "Prōtonōbelissimos" (with the Greek numeral "A" for "Prōto-") from the codicil of the Sicilian admiral Christodulus

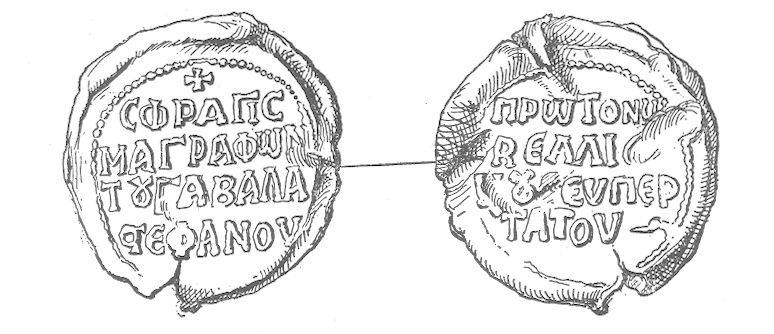
- Seal of the prōtonōbelissimohypertatos Stephen Gabalas
- Member of: Roman Imperial Family
- Appointer: Roman emperor
- Term length: Life tenure
- Formation: 335
- First holder: Hannibalianus
- Abolished: 29 May 1453
- Succession: Eighty-third (Fourteenth Century); Ninth (c. 1118); Third (c. 1070); Second

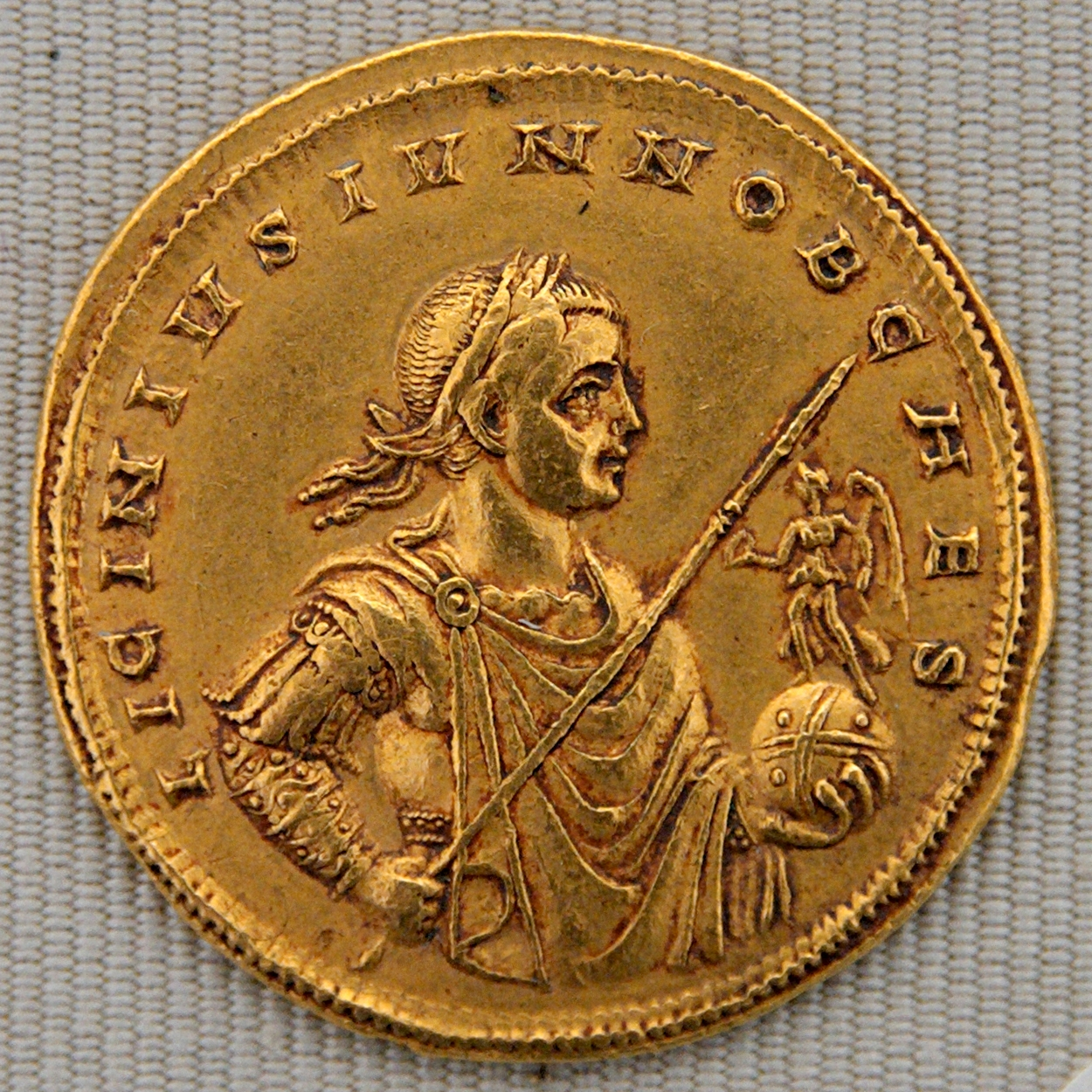
Coin of Licinius II c. 315 – c. 326, the inscription "LICINIUS IUNior NOBilissimus CAESar" translates as 'Licinius Junior Most Noble Caesar'

Nobilissimus (Latin for "most noble"), in Byzantine Greek nōbelissimos (Greek: νωβελίσσιμος), was one of the highest imperial titles in the late Roman and Byzantine empires. The feminine form of the title was nobilissima.

== History and functions ==
The term nobilissimus originated as an epithet to the title of Caesar, whose holder was the Roman and Byzantine emperor's heir-apparent and who would, after Geta in 198, be addressed nobilissimus Caesar. According to the historian Zosimus, Emperor Constantine the Great (r. 306–337) first turned nobilissimus into a separate dignity, so as to honour some of his relatives without implying a claim to the imperial throne. The title thus came to be awarded to members of the imperial family, coming in rank immediately after that of Caesar, and remained so throughout the early and middle Byzantine period, until the mid-11th century. In the Klētorologion of Philotheos, written in 899, the rank's insignia are described as a purple tunic, mantle and belt, indicating the exalted position of its holder. Their award by the emperor in a special ceremony signified the elevation of the recipient to the office.

From the late 11th century, the title was given to senior army commanders, the future Byzantine emperor Alexios Komnenos being the first to be thus honoured. The inflation of its holders during the Komnenian period led to its devaluation, and the new titles of prōtonōbelissimos (πρωτονωβελίσσιμος, "first nobilissimus") and prōtonōbelissimohypertatos (πρωτονωβελισσιμοϋπέρτατος, "supreme first nobilissimus") were created in the 12th century, dropping nobilissimus from third to ninth in the new court hierarchy established by Alexios. nobilissimus puer referred to "most noble child".

== Nobilissimi ==
List of Nobilissimi prior to the reforms of Alexios I Komnenos
Name	Birth	Tenure	Death	Emperor	Notes	Refs
Fausta	289	307–324	326	Constantine the Great (wife)	Nobilissima femina, promoted to Augusta	
Flavia Julia Constantia	c. 294	c. 313–324	c. 330	Constantine the Great (sister) Licinius (wife)	Nobilissima femina	
Hannibalianus	c. 320	335–c. 337		Constantine the Great (Nephew and son-in-law)	'King of the Kings and of the Pontic Peoples' (Rex Regum et Ponticarum Gentium), murdered by Constantine's sons	
Varronianus	c. 360	363–364	?	Jovian (son)		
Valentinianus Galates	366	c. 366–c. 373	before 373	Valens (son)		
Gratian	359	366–367	383	Valentinian I (son)	promoted to Augustus	
Galla Placidia	392/3	c. 394–421	450	Theodosius I (daughter)	Nobilissima puella, promoted to Augusta	
Valentinian III	419	421/3–424	455	Honorius (nephew)	promoted to Caesar, later Augustus (425)	
Justinian I	482	525	565	Justin (nephew and adopted son)I	promoted to Caesar, later Augustus (527)	
Martinos	c. 628	638–639	641?	Heraclius (fourth son)	promoted to Caesar	
Niketas	c. 765	769–780	c. 799	Constantine V (fourth son)	Exiled to monastery for plotting against their nephew Constantine VI	
Eudokimos	c. 769	c. 770–799	c. 799	Constantine V (fifth son)	Exiled to monastery for plotting against their nephew Constantine VI	
Anthimos	c. 770	c. 770–799	c. 799	Constantine V (sixth son)	Exiled to monastery for plotting against their nephew Constantine VI	
Constantine	c. 1010	c. 1034–1042	c. 1060	Michael IV the Paphlagonian (brother)	blinded by his nephew Michael V Kalaphates	
Bagrat IV of Georgia	1018	c. 1054–1060	1072	Constantine IX Monomachos	King of Georgia, promoted to Sebastos	
George II of Georgia	c. 1050	1072–?	112	Michael VII Doukas	King of Georgia, promoted to Sebastos	
Robert Guiscard	c. 1015	1074–1078	1085	Michael VII Doukas	Betrothed his daughter Olympias to Doukas' sonConstantine	
John	c. 1080			Nikephoros III Botaneiates	Domestic of the Schools of the East	
Tzachas		c. 1078–1081	1093	Nikephoros III Botaneiates		
Alexios Komnenos	c. 1057	1078	1118	Nikephoros III Botaneiates	Domestic of the Schools of the west, promoted to Sebastos, later emperor (1081)	

== Sources ==
- Bury, John Bagnell (1911). The Imperial Administrative System of the Ninth Century - With a Revised Text of the Kletorologion of Philotheos. London: Oxford University Press.
- Kazhdan, Alexander (1991). "Nobelissimos". In Kazhdan, Alexander (ed.). The Oxford Dictionary of Byzantium. Oxford and New York: Oxford University Press. pp. 1489–1490. ISBN 0-19-504652-8.
- Mitthof, Fritz (1993). "Vom ἱερώτατος Καίσαρ zum ἐπιφανέστατος Καίσαρ. Die Ehrenprädikate in der Titulatur der Thronfolger des 3. Jh. n. Chr. nach den Papyri" (PDF). Zeitschrift für Papyrologie und Epigraphik (in German). 99. Bonn: Dr. Rudolf Habelt GmbH: 97–111.
