= Fragmentary Troia Chronicle =

Troia stories from the 11th and 12th centuries

First page of the oldest surviving edition of the Troia Chronicle from 1782

The Fragmentary Troia Chronicle (Latin: Chronici Trojani fragmentum) is a short, anonymous Latin history of the south Italian city of Troia and the bishops of Troia in the 11th and 12th centuries. The text as it has come down is fragmentary and incomplete. It is a hybrid text, containing annals, a short hagiographical section and partial copies of charters. Due to the poor transmission of the text, its authenticity and reliability have been questioned.

== Transmission ==
There is no surviving manuscript of the Chronicle. It survives only in printed form. This shows numerous copying errors and other signs of a complicated transmission and possible editing. The earliest copy is the edition included by Alessio Aurelio Pelliccia in his De Christianae Ecclesiae primae, mediae et novissimae aetatis Politia, printed in 1779 and again in 1782. This edition was based on a parchment codex copied by Giovanni Francesco Rossi in the 16th century and given to Pelliccia by his friend Lodovico Vuolo along with a trove of old documents. Rossi was also the source of the only known manuscript copy of the Annales of Lupus Protospatharius, also now lost. According to Pelliccia, the Chronicle was a mere "fragment" in the copy he received. The title he gave it, Chronici Trojani fragmentum, means "fragment of a Troian chronicle". The text as it stands is incomplete and disorganized.

The Chronicle, written in Latin, is generally assumed to have been compiled in the late 12th century. It was used by Biondo Flavio in the 15th century and Marino Freccia in the 16th, and through them was a source for Ferdinando Ughelli's Italia Sacra in the 17th century. It is very closely related to the Ristretto dell'Istoria della città di Troja e sua Diocesi dall'origine delle medesime al 1584, written by Pietrantonio Rosso di Manfredonia between 1584 and 1592. It is possible that Pietrantonio used Rossi's copy of the Chronicle as a source or that the two texts were copied from the same common source. The Ristretto dell'Istoria may contain information from a fuller or complete version of the Chronicle, but no reconstruction of the full text has yet been attempted.

== Structure ==
The Chronicle is a hybrid text that combines genres, but its three sections are not coherently melded. A portion of the text is hagiographical, while much of the rest has the appearance of a barebones gesta episcoporum ('deeds of bishops'). It contains a collection of twelve charters. These could not have served as a functional cartulary, however, because the authenticating parts of the charters are left off.

The first section is a series of annalistic records of political and religious events in the city of Troia and its diocese between 1014 and 1127. Its coverage, however, is sporadic. It has entries dated to the years 1014, 1081, 1093, 1097, 1101, 1105, 1114, 1115, 1116, 1118, 1119, 1122 and 1124, although the last entry in fact pertains to 1127. It also contains entries without years and dated only to a specific bishop's tenure. Between the entries for 1101 and 1114, that for 1105 is an interlude with its own subheading, De corporibus sanctis ('Concerning Holy Bodies'). It describes the transfer to Troia in that year of the relics of three saints: Bishop Eleutherius, the confessor Anastasius and Pope Pontianus. This interlude appears to have as one of its sources the 12th-century In translatione sanctorum martirum Euletherii, Pontiani atque confessoris Anastasii by the Troian precentor Roffred.

The second section breaks from the annalistic form of the first and appears to be quite fragmentary. It contains two subheadings, Dedicatio Ecclesiae S. Vincentii de Troya ('Dedication of the Church of St Vincent of Troia') and Corrigia Troyana. Each subsection contains a summary of a document, followed by information drawn from an annalistic source. The first document is dated to 1169 and is followed by references to 1170 and 1190. The second document is dated to 1182 and is followed by a reference to 1187.

The third section contains ten privileges issued to the diocese of Troia between 1066 and sometime after 1231, when the Emperor Frederick II introduced the augustalis coin. They could not have become appended to the first two sections of the Chronicle earlier than the 13th century. The copies of the charters are abbreviated. They are not presented in chronological order and no principle of selection is apparent. All but one of these documents can also be found in Vincenzo Aceto di San Severo's two-volume manuscript Troia Sagra from 1728. All but two are accepted as authentic by the critical editor of Troia's charters, Jean-Marie Martin.

== Reliability and potential ==
The Chronicle shares a poor manuscript tradition with the other 11th- and 12th-century chronicles from Apulia. Both the Annales of Lupus Protospatharius and the Annales Barenses survive in nothing earlier than 15th-century manuscripts, while the earliest copy of the Anonymi Barensis Chronicon is a printed edition from 1643. All three Bariot annals are accepted as authentic medieval texts. Noting that some of its material can be corroborated with other sources, Vera von Falkenhausen concludes that "the Chronicle of Troia is more reliable than its reputation". According to Paul Oldfield, "while we cannot ... ascertain when certain parts of the [Chronicle] were first compiled, the current evidence suggests that we can tentatively proceed on the basis that the [its] information does contain some reliability in the annalistic section ... offset by inaccuracies particularly linked to the transmission of the text."

The Chronicle contains some information not found in other sources:

- The birth name of the daughter of Robert Guiscard who was married to Constantine Doukas is found in only one other source. She was born Olympias and re-named Helena upon her betrothal. Her name is recorded under the year 1081, when her father invaded Byzantium.
- The individuals who discovered the relics of Eleutherius, Anastasius and Pontianus are named Perisentia, Gaio and Aurelio, based on an inscription. Neither the inscription nor these individuals are mentioned in Roffred's account.
- No other source records the conflict in 1115 between Bishop William II of Troia and William of Hauteville, who is said to have been attacking pilgrims on their way to Jerusalem. There is a charter from 1120 that demonstrates the strained relationship between the two Williams.
- The record of the journey of Duke William II of Apulia to the court of the Byzantine Empire in 1116, found nowhere else, is implausible.
- Various biographical details of the bishops of Troia are found nowhere else. Some can be corroborated from charters. Less trustworthy are the claim that all the bishops from 1041 on were consecrated by the pope and the supposed dates of their consecration.

Since the Chronicle can be shown to have been in circulation in something like its present form by the late 16th century, in a few cases it presents the earliest form of various charters otherwise known only from the Aceto collection.

== Editions ==
- Chronici Trojani fragmentum, in A. A. Pelliccia (ed.), De Christianae Ecclesiae primae, mediae et novissimae aetatis Politia (Bassano: Remondini, 1782), Vol. 3, 1: 343–356.

== Bibliography ==
- Falkenhausen, Vera von (1982). "Olympias, eine normannische Prinzessin in Konstantinopel". Bisanzio e l'Italia: Raccolta di studi in memoria di Agostino Pertusi. Vita e pensiero. pp. 56–72.
- Loud, Graham A. (2007). The Latin Church in Norman Italy. Cambridge University Press.
- Oldfield, Paul (2021). "The Troia Chronicle and Historiographical Production in Medieval Puglia". Papers of the British School at Rome. FirstView. 90: 1–25. doi:10.1017/S0068246221000234. S2CID 243824617.
