= Doukas =

Byzantine noble family

Doukas Δούκας Doukid dynasty
- Imperial dynasty
- Country: Byzantine Empire
- Founded: 10th century, 1059; 967 years ago (as imperial dynasty)
- Founder: Andronikos Doukas (first known); Constantine X Doukas (first emperor)
- Final ruler: Nikephoros III Botaneiates
- Titles: Byzantine Emperor
- Connected families: Komnenodoukas
- Deposition: 1081; 945 years ago

The House of Doukas (pl. Doukai; Greek: Δούκας, pl. Δούκαι, feminine form Doukaina; Δούκαινα), Latinized as Ducas, (Note: pl. Ducae, feminine from Ducaena) (Note: from the Latin title dux "leader", "general", Hellenized as δοὺξ [ðouks]) was a Byzantine Greek noble family, whose branches provided several notable generals and rulers to the Byzantine Empire in the 9th to 11th centuries. A maternally-descended line, the Komnenodoukai, founded the Despotate of Epirus in the 13th century, with another branch ruling over Thessaly.

The continuity of descent amongst the various branches of the original, middle Byzantine family is not clear, and historians generally recognize several distinct groups of Doukai based on their occurrence in the contemporary sources. According to Polemis, who compiled the only overview work on the bearers of the Doukas name, in view of this lack of genealogical continuity "it would be a mistake to view the groups of people designated by the cognomen of Doukas as forming one large family".

== History ==
=== Origins ===
Nothing is known for certain about the family's origin. Later tradition, mentioned by the historian Nikephoros Bryennios, held that they descended from a paternal cousin of the Roman emperor Constantine I who had migrated to Constantinople in the 4th century and allegedly became the city's governor with the title of doux. This tradition is, however, evidently an invention meant to glorify the family, at the time the Empire's ruling dynasty, by 11th-century court chroniclers. In fact, it is more likely that the surname derives from the relatively common military rank of doux. Some authors have raised the possibility of an Armenian descent, but all evidence suggests that the Doukai were native-born Greeks, probably from Paphlagonia in north-central Anatolia, where their estates were located.

=== Doukai of the early 10th century ===
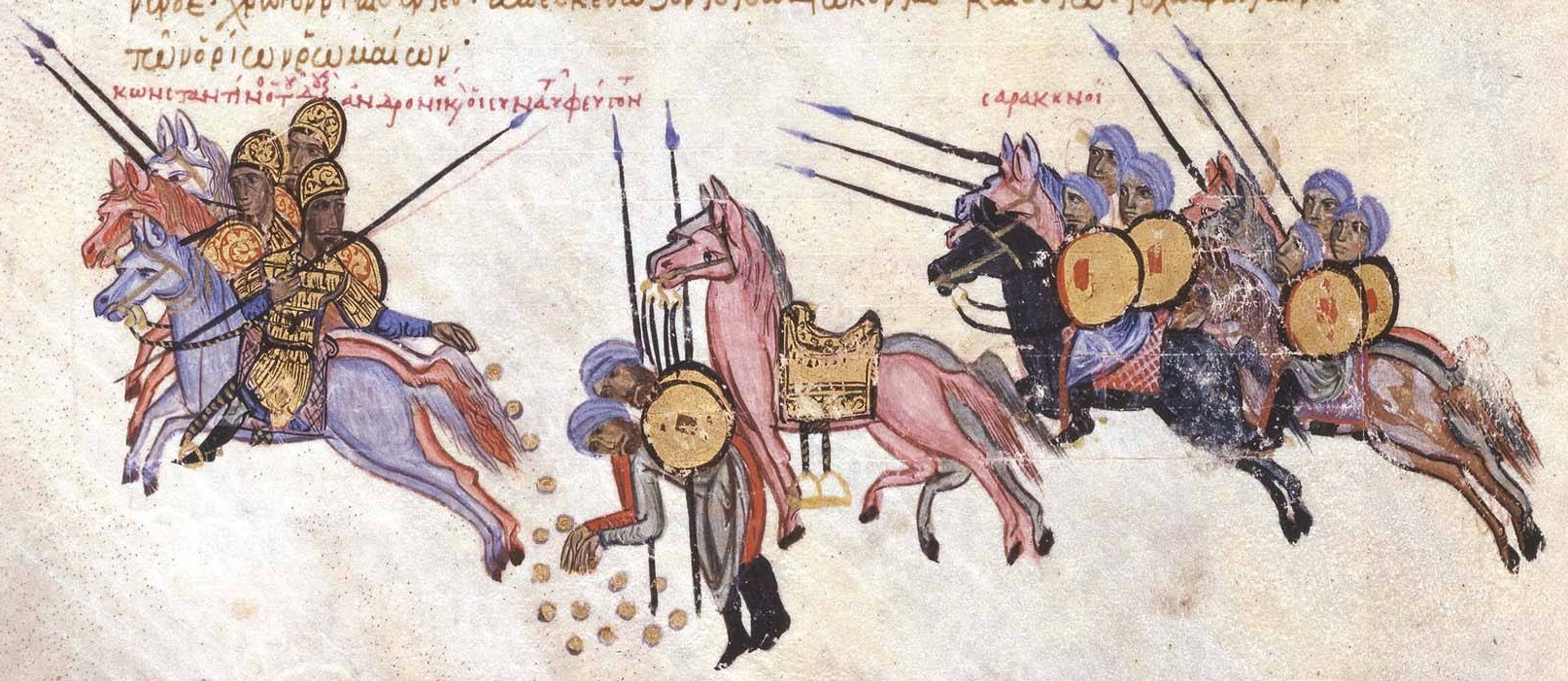
Constantine Doukas escapes from Arab captivity, throwing gold coins behind him to delay his pursuers. Miniature from the Madrid Skylitzes chronicle.

The first representative of the family appears in the mid-9th century, during the regency of Empress Theodora (r. 842–855), when he was sent to forcibly convert the Paulicians to Orthodoxy. He is only known as "the son of Doux", although Skylitzes interpolates the name of Andronikos, probably in confusion with Andronikos Doukas (see next). This name is also used by some modern sources--e.g., in the Prosopographie der mittelbyzantinischen Zeit (Andronikos #433).

The first branch of the family to achieve prominence was in the early 10th century (they are usually referred to with the archaic form Doux rather than Doukas in the sources), with Andronikos Doukas and his son Constantine Doukas. Both were senior generals during the reign of Emperor Leo VI the Wise (r. 886–912). In circa 904, Andronikos engaged in an unsuccessful rebellion and was forced to flee to Baghdad where he was killed circa 910. Constantine managed to escape and was restored to high office, becoming Domestic of the Schools. He was killed, however, along with his son Gregory and nephew Michael, in an unsuccessful coup in June 913. These deaths, along with the castration and exile of Constantine's younger son Stephen and the death of a Nicholas Doukas (of uncertain relation to the others) at the Battle of Katasyrtai in 917, mark the end of the first group of Doukai recorded in Byzantine sources. It is likely, as the 12th-century historian Zonaras records, that the Doukai line died out, and that the later bearers of the name were descendants through the female line only.

=== Lydoi-Doukai under Basil II ===
Towards the end of the 10th century, there appeared a second family, sometimes known as Lydoi ("the Lydians", likely indicating their origin). Its members were Andronikos Doux Lydos and his sons, Christopher and Bardas, the latter known by the sobriquet Mongos ("hoarse"). It is unclear whether the doux in Andronikos's name is a surname or a military rank; some scholars consider them as belonging to the Doukas clan, although the exact relation, if any, with the earlier Doukai is impossible to ascertain. The family was involved in the 976–979 rebellion of Bardas Skleros against Emperor Basil II (r. 976–1025), but the sons were later pardoned and resumed their careers. Bardas the Mongos is attested as late as 1017, when he led a military expedition against the Khazars.

=== Doukas imperial dynasty ===
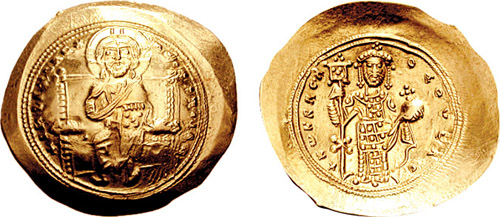
Gold histamenon of Emperor Constantine X Doukas (r. 1059–1067).

The third group of the family, the Doukai of the 11th century, was the more numerous and distinguished one, providing several generals and governors, and founding the Doukid dynasty which ruled Byzantium from 1059 to 1081. These Doukai seem to have come from Paphlagonia, and were exceedingly wealthy, possessing extensive estates in Anatolia. Again, the relationship of this group with the Doukai of the 9th and 10th centuries is unclear; the contemporary writers Michael Psellos and Nicholas Kallikles affirm such a relationship, but Zonaras openly questioned it.

The most famous members of this group were the dynasty's founder, Emperor Constantine X Doukas (r. 1059–1067), his brother John Doukas, katepano and later Caesar, Constantine's son Michael VII Doukas (r. 1071–1078), Michael's younger brothers, Konstantios and Andronikos Doukas, Michael's son and co-emperor Constantine Doukas and John's son, the general Andronikos Doukas.

During this period, the family intermarried with other aristocratic clans: before becoming emperor, Constantine X had married into the powerful Dalassenoi family, and took as a second wife Eudokia Makrembolitissa, niece of the Patriarch Michael Keroularios. Further dynastic matches were made with the clans of the Anatolian military aristocracy, including the Palaiologoi and the Pegonitai. The most important connection, however, was to the Komnenoi: in 1077, Alexios Komnenos, then a general and later emperor (r. 1081–1118), married Irene Doukaina, the great-niece of Constantine X; thereafter, the family name Komnenodoukas was often used. This marriage alliance was crucial for Alexios's own rise to the purple: his marriage to a Doukaina made him senior to his elder brother Isaac, and it was Doukai financial and political support that largely facilitated the successful and bloodless coup that brought him to the throne.

=== Under the Komnenoi ===
Their association with the Komnenoi helped ensure the continued prominence and prestige of the Doukas name at the apex of the Byzantine aristocracy into the Komnenian period, and the presence of the family's members amongst the higher officials of the Byzantine state. During the reign of Alexios I, the Doukai continued to play an important role: Constantine Doukas was recognized as heir-apparent and affianced to Anna Komnene (although he lost his title when the future John II Komnenos was born); and Irene Doukaina's brothers, the protostrator Michael Doukas and the megas doux John Doukas were among the most prominent military leaders of the late 11th century.

During the 12th century, the prestige of the Doukas name meant that it was often taken as a second surname by members of other families, even if remotely (and usually matrilineally) linked to the actual Doukai, who became relatively obscure after the turn of the century. It is hence impossible to clearly distinguish the numerous holders of the name or to discern their exact relationship with the 11th-century Doukid dynasty. The actual bloodline of Constantine X died out probably before 1100, and the last known descendants of his brother, the Caesar John, lived in the first half of the 12th century. The majority of the 12th-century bearers of the name were therefore most likely members of other families, linked through marriage with the Doukai, who chose to emphasize this relationship due to the prestige the name conferred.

=== Later branches ===
In this way, mingled with other noble families or adopted de novo even by humble families unrelated to the original lineage, the Doukas name survived into the last centuries of the Byzantine Empire. A prominent example of the Late Byzantine period were the Komnenodoukai of the Despotate of Epirus in northwestern Greece, founded by Michael I Komnenos Doukas and other descendants of John Doukas, a grandson of Alexios I Komnenos and Irene Doukaina. From them the surname "Doukas" was used by the Greek, and later Serbian, rulers of Epirus and Thessaly until the 15th century. Other examples include John III Doukas Vatatzes, Nicaean emperor (r. 1221–1254) and his relatives, the late Byzantine historian Doukas, and the megas papias Demetrios Doukas Kabasilas in the mid-14th century.

The name spread far and wide across the Greek-speaking world as well as in Albania, and remains fairly common to this day. Among the more notable bearers of the Doukas name in the post-Byzantine period were the 16th-century Cretan scholar Demetrius Ducas, the 17th-century rulers of Moldavia George Ducas and Constantine Ducas (their descent is variously given as Greek, Vlach or Albanian) or the 19th-century scholar and educationalist Neophytos Doukas. Several variations also developed, such as Doukakes (Δουκάκης) (cf. former Massachusetts state governor Michael Dukakis), Doukopoulos (Δουκόπουλος), Doukatos (Δουκάτος), Makrodoukas or Makrydoukas (Μακροδούκας/Μακρυδούκας), etc. Other variants like Doukaites (Δουκαΐτης) or Doukides (Δουκίδης) seem to derive not from the surname, but from a locality and a first name "Doukas" respectively. The Duka de Kádár family also claimed the ancestry of the Doukas Imperial dynasty, which was quoted in their 1799 Hungarian patent of nobility. However, as Austrian historian Max Demeter Peyfuss mentions, they were of Aromanian ancestry from Voskopoja, and there is no historical evidence to link them directly to the Byzantine ruling family.

== Family tree of the House of Doukas ==
Vasileios Argyros	Romanos III Argyros; Emperor of Romans (1028-34)	Zoë; Empress of Romans (1042-1050); HOUSE OF MACEDONIAN
(daughter) ∞ Constantine Diogenes	Andronikos Doukas; HOUSE OF DOUKAS
Romanos IV Diogenes; Emperor of Romans	Eudokia Makrembolitissa	Constantine X Emperor of Romans (1059-1067)	John caesar ∞ Irene Pegonitissa	Sophia	Manuel Erotikos from Comne; HOUSE OF KOMNENOS
Nikephoros III Botaneiates; Emperor of Romans (1078-1081)	Maria of Alania (daughter Bagrat IV of Georgia)	Michael VII; Emperor of Romans (1071-1076)	Andronikos co-emperor	Konstantios co-emperor	Theodora ∞ Domenico Selvo dogue of Venice	Andronikos domestikos of Scholon of East ∞ Maria of Bulgaria	Isaac I Komnenos; Emperor of Romans (1057-1059)	John Komnenos domestikos ton Scholon
Constantine co-emperor	Constantine sebastos	Michael protostrator	John megas doux	Anna ∞ George Palaiologos general	Irene	Alexios I Komnenos; Emperor of Romans (1081-1118)
Irene ∞ Gregory Kamateros logothetes ton Sekreton	Alexios Palaiologos megas doux ∞ Anna Komnene Doukaina	Theodora Komnene ∞ Constantine Angelos
Georgios Palaiologos megas eteriarhes	Andronikos Angelos general
Alexios despot ∞ Irene Angelina	Alexios III Angelos; Emperor of Romans

== See also ==
- History of the Byzantine Empire
- Byzantine Empire under the Doukas dynasty

== Sources ==
- Cheynet, Jean-Claude (1996). Pouvoir et Contestations à Byzance (963–1210) (in French). Paris: Publications de la Sorbonne. ISBN 978-2-85944-168-5.
- Kazhdan, Alexander, ed. (1991). The Oxford Dictionary of Byzantium. Oxford and New York: Oxford University Press. ISBN 0-19-504652-8.
- Krsmanović, Bojana (11 September 2003). "Doukas family". Encyclopaedia of the Hellenic World, Asia Minor. Athens: Foundation of the Hellenic World. "Μεγάλη διαδικτυακή εγκυκλοπαίδεια της Μικράς Ασίας". Archived from the original on 2012-02-20.
- Polemis, Demetrios I. (1968). The Doukai: A Contribution to Byzantine Prosopography. London: The Athlone Press.
