= Monastery of the Transfiguration, Kinaliada =

Monastery of the Transfiguration
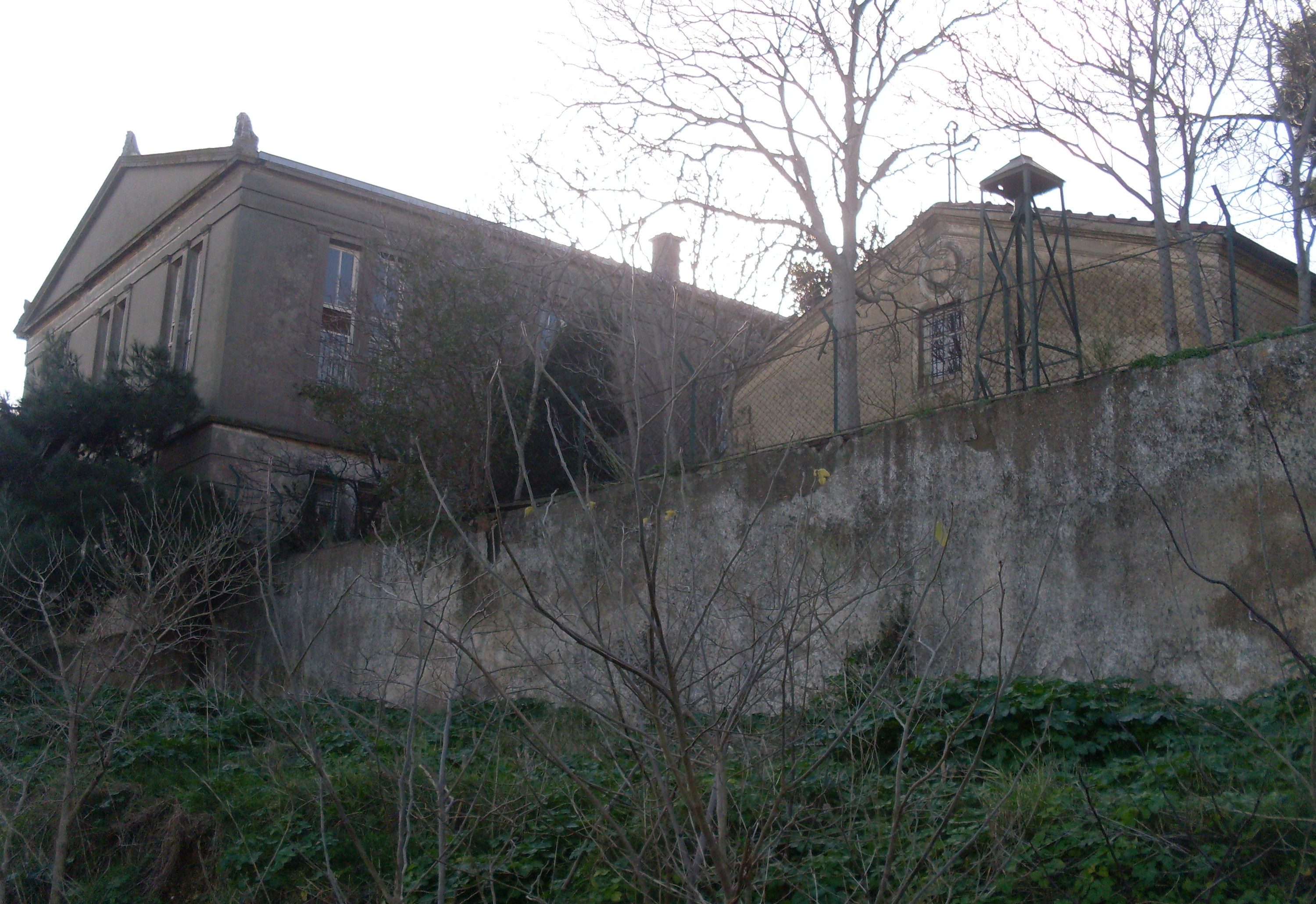
- The Monastery viewed from the South

- Location within Istanbul
- 40.905869°N 29.050243°E
- Location: Kınalıada, Istanbul
- Country: Turkey
- Denomination: Greek Orthodox

Architecture
- Style: Byzantine
- Completed: circa 1070-1080s

Administration
- Metropolis: Patriarchate of Constantinople

The Monastery of the Transfiguration, known locally as Hristo [Christ] Monastery, is a prominent Greek Orthodox monastery that has served the Greek Orthodox community of Constantinople (modern Istanbul) since the time of the Byzantine Empire. The monastery is located on the island of Kınalıada, one of the Prince Islands in the Sea of Marmara. It is situated on one of the highest peaks on the island called Hristo Peak (93 meters), which is named after the Monastery. The Monastery is especially known as a destination for exiled Byzantine Emperors in the 11th century.

== History ==
It is believed that the Byzantine Emperor Leo V the Armenian was the first buried in what would later be the Monastery after his exile to the Prince Islands.

However, it is widely considered that the Monastery was built for the exiled Byzantine Emperor Romanos IV Diogenes (r. 1068–1071) some centuries later. After his defeat at the Battle of Manzikert in 1071, the Byzantine Emperor had his eyes gouged out and sent to exile on the island of Proti (now Kınalıada) where he spent his time in exile at the Monastery. The island of Proti was among the small island group located near Constantinople, in the Sea of Marmara. These islands would eventually be known as the Prince Islands because of the many Byzantine princes exiled there. Romanos IV Diogenes spent the rest of his life on the island, dying from his wounds. It is believed that his body is buried not too far from the current Armenian orphanage on the island. Not long after Romanos, Emperor Nikephoros III Botaneiates (r. 1078–1081), was also exiled to the Monastery after he was forced to abdicate his throne.

The Monastery has been repeatedly demolished and rebuilt. After the Ottoman conquest of Constantinople, the Monastery fell into a ruinous state. In 1722, the Monastery underwent a major reconstruction by a group of wealthy Greek merchants from the island of Chios, who were based in Constantinople. The restoration included the construction of a new katholikon and a side chapel dedicated to Saint Paraskevi above the original Byzantine monastery. The Byzantine icons of the original monastery were transferred to the Greek Orthodox Church of Constantinople for preservation.

In July 1998, Bartholomew I, the Ecumenical Patriarch of Constantinople, expressed his concerns regarding the deprivation of land belonging to the Monastery. The Turkish authorities have claimed that the Monastery, which serves as a camping ground and a summer vacationing house for children, is only entitled to the building itself.

== Legacy ==
The bay located on the northern half of the island is called Manastır Bay, named after the Monastery.

It is featured in many popular travel guides such as Frommers. The Monastery continues to attract many tourists.
