= Leo Diogenes =

Byzantine emperor from 1069 to 1071

- Emperor and Autocrat of the Romans

Byzantine co-emperor
- Reign: 1070 – November 1071
- Senior emperor: Romanos IV Diogenes
- Co-emperors: Nikephoros (1069–1071); Michael VII (1071–1078); Konstantios (1060–1078); Andronikos (1068–1070s)
- Born: c. 1069
- Died: 14 August 1087 (aged 18); Dristra
- Father: Romanos IV Diogenes
- Mother: Eudokia Makrembolitissa

Leo Diogenes (Greek: Λέων Διογένης, romanized: Leōn Diogenēs; c. 1069 – 14 August 1087), styled as porphyrogenitus, was the son of Byzantine Emperor Romanos IV Diogenes and Eudokia Makrembolitissa. Likely crowned co-emperor together with his elder brother during his father's reign in 1070, he later served in the armies of Emperor Alexios I Komnenos. He does not appear on any of Romanos' coins, although there is at least one letter that refers to him as emperor (basileus). Anna Komnene notes that he and his brother Nikephoros both wore the diadem and tzangion (red sandals) usually reserved to emperors.

== Life ==
Leo's birth is not recorded in sources. He had a brother, Nikephoros Diogenes, whose birth is not recorded either. Romanos IV Diogenes and Eudokia Makrembolitissa married on 1 January 1068, meaning they were born in late 1068 or early 1069 at the earliest, probably as twins.

Although elevated to the rank of co-emperor on their birth, they were both was banished to a monastery along with their mother after the fall of Romanos. Here they remained until the accession of Alexios I Komnenos in 1081, who took them and raised them like his own sons.

According to Anna Komnene's account, Leo was a committed supporter of Alexios, who urged him not only to confront the Norman invaders early in his reign, but also the Pechenegs who had invaded the empire from beyond the Danube. During one of the pitched battles against the Pechenegs, Leo allowed himself to be drawn away from the emperor's side, and as he approached the wagons of the enemy, he was struck down and died on the field of battle.

In 1095 an impostor of Leo, Pseudo-Diogenes, convinced the Cuman chieftains Boniak and Tugorkan to invade the Byzantine Empire, dethrone Alexios and install himself as emperor. The Cumans occupied Paristrion before being repulsed by Byzantine forces, led by Alexios.

== Sources ==
- Komnene, Anna (1928) [1148]. The Alexiad. Translation by Elizabeth Dawes.
- Skoulatos, Basile (1980). Les personnages byzantins de l'Alexiade: Analyse prosopographique et synthèse [The Byzantine Personalities of the Alexiad: Prosopographical Analysis and Synthesis] (in French). Louvain-la-Neuve and Louvain: Bureau du Recueil Collège Érasme and Éditions Nauwelaerts.
