= Constantine X Doukas =

Byzantine emperor from 1059 to 1067

- Emperor and Autocrat of the Romans
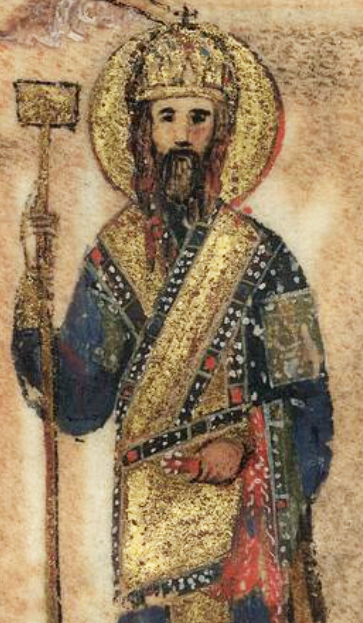
- Contemporary miniature of Constantine X, previously thought to be Alexios I

Byzantine emperor
- Reign: 23 November 1059 – 23 May 1067
- Predecessor: Isaac I
- Successor: Eudokia (disputed)
- Co-emperors: Konstantios; Michael VII
- Born: c. 1006
- Died: 23 May 1067 (aged 60–61)
- Spouse: Delassena; Eudokia Makrembolitissa
- Issue: by Eudocia; Michael VII Doukas; A son Anne Doukaina; Andronikos Doukas; Theodora Doukaina; Konstantios Doukas; Zoe Doukaina
- Dynasty: Doukas
- Father: Andronikos Doukas

Constantine X Doukas or Ducas (Greek: Κωνσταντῖνος Δούκας, romanized: Kōnstantīnos Doúkās; c. 1006 – 23 May 1067), was Byzantine emperor from 1059 to 1067. He was the founder of the Doukid dynasty. During his reign, the Normans took over much of the remaining Byzantine territories in Italy, while in the Balkans the Hungarians occupied Belgrade. He also suffered defeats by the Seljuk sultan Alp Arslan.

== Reign ==
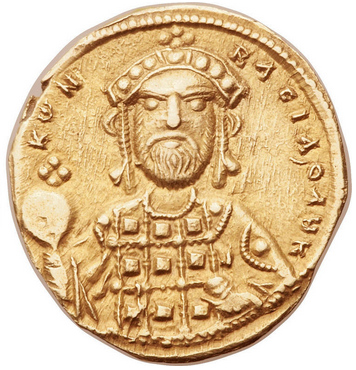
A gold tetarteron of Constantine X

Constantine's parents are not mentioned in any primary sources, but some scholars theorize that he was the son of Andronikos Doukas, a nobleman who served as strategos of Preslav during the reign of Basil II (r. 976–1025). Historians often give his birthdate as c. 1006, as he is said to have died aged "slightly over sixty years". He was an academic, addicted to endless debates about philosophy and theology, and he gained influence after he married, as his second wife, Eudokia Makrembolitissa, a niece of Patriarch Michael Keroularios. In 1057, Constantine supported the usurpation of Isaac I Komnenos, gradually siding with the court bureaucracy against the new emperor's reforms. In spite of this tacit opposition, Constantine was chosen as successor by the ailing Isaac in 1059, under the influence of Michael Psellos. Isaac abdicated on 22 November and Constantine X was crowned emperor on the following day.

The new emperor quickly associated two of his young sons in power, Michael VII Doukas and Konstantios Doukas, and appointed his brother John Doukas as kaisar (caesar), and also embarked on a policy favorable to the interests of the court bureaucracy and the church. Severely undercutting the training and financial support for the armed forces, Constantine X disbanded the Armenian local militia of 50,000 men at a crucial point of time, coinciding with the westward advance of the Seljuk Turks and their Turcoman allies. Undoing many of the necessary reforms of Isaac I Komnenos, he bloated the military bureaucracy with highly paid court officials and crowded the Senate with his supporters. He even started a persecution of the Armenian Church due to many Anatolian-landed aristocrats being Armenian descent and as part of the campaign to further crackdown against the Anatolian-landed aristocracy thus alienating many Armenians.

His decisions to replace standing soldiers with mercenaries and leave the frontier fortifications unrepaired led Constantine to become naturally unpopular with the supporters of Isaac within the military aristocracy, who attempted to assassinate him in 1061. He also became unpopular with the general population after he raised taxes to try to pay the army.

At the very start of his reign, the Normans under Robert Guiscard completed the conquest of Byzantine Calabria, but Constantine showed a resurgent interest in retaining Apulia. He appointed at least two catepans of Italy (Marules and Sirianus) and sent reinforcements on two further occasions (under "Miriarcha" and Michael Maurex). He also suffered invasions by Alp Arslan in Asia Minor in 1064, resulting in the loss of the Armenian capital, and by the Oghuz Turks in the Balkans in 1065, while Belgrade was lost to the Hungarians.

Already old and unhealthy when he came to power, Constantine died on 23 May 1067. His final act was to demand that only his sons succeed him, forcing his wife Eudokia Makrembolitissa to take a vow not to remarry. Both Michael and Konstantios were too young to rule, so Empress Eudokia ruled as the de facto ruler until 1 January 1068, when she married Romanos IV Diogenes and crowned him emperor.

== Family ==
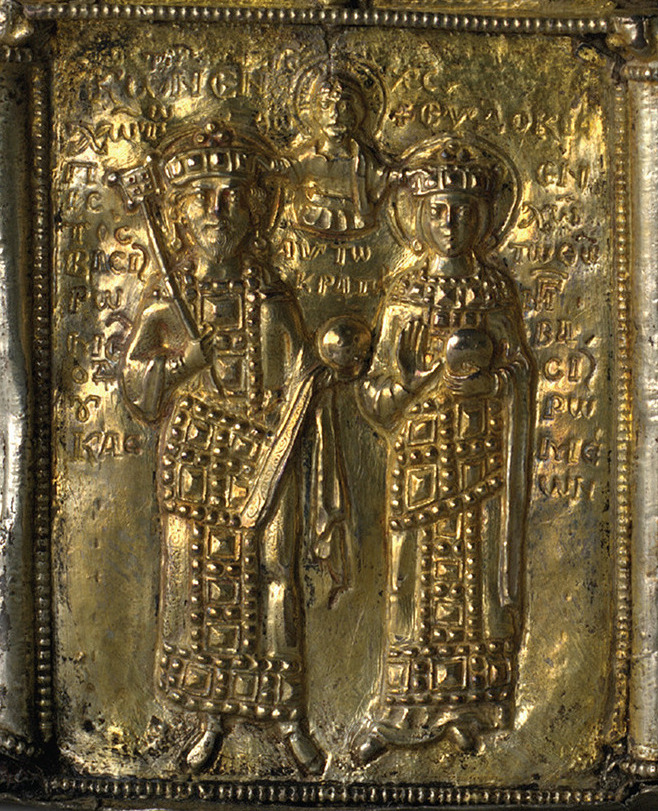
Constantine X and Eudokia Makrembolitissa in a reliquary of Demetrius of Thessaloniki.

By his first wife, a daughter of Constantine Dalassenos, Constantine X Doukas had no issue.

By his second wife, Eudokia Makrembolitissa, he had four sons and three daughters:

- Michael VII Doukas, co-emperor from 1060 and senior emperor after 1071.
- A son who died in infancy.
- Anne Doukaina, nun.
- Andronikos Doukas, co-emperor from 1068 to 1078.
- Theodora Doukaina, who married Domenico Selvo, Doge of Venice.
- Konstantios Doukas, co-emperor from 1060 to 1078, died in battle with the Normans in 1081
- Zoe Doukaina, who married Adrianos Komnenos, a brother of Emperor Alexios I Komnenos. They had a son, Alexios, and two daughters, maybe named Anne and Alexia.

== See also ==
- List of Byzantine emperors

== Notes ==
Constantine X Doukas Doukid dynasty Born: c. 1006 Died: 23 May 1067
Regnal titles
Preceded by Isaac I	Byzantine emperor 1059–1067	Succeeded by Eudokia (disputed)
