= Nikephoros Diogenes =

Byzantine emperor from 1070 to 1071

- Emperor and Autocrat of the Romans

Byzantine co-emperor
- Reign: c. 1069 – November 1071
- Senior emperor: Romanos IV Diogenes
- Co-emperors: Leo (1070–1071); Michael VII (1071–1078); Konstantios (1060–1078); Andronikos (1068–1070s)
- Born: c. 1069
- Died: After 1094
- Father: Romanos IV Diogenes
- Mother: Eudokia Makrembolitissa

Nikephoros Diogenes (Greek: Νικηφόρος Διογένης, romanized: Nikēphóros Diogenēs), Latinized as Nicephorus Diogenes, was presumably a junior Byzantine emperor around 1069–1071. He was born c. 1069 to Emperor Romanos IV Diogenes and Empress Eudokia Makrembolitissa. He was elevated to junior emperor in 1070, although he lost this position when his father was overthrown in 1071. Emperor Alexios I Komnenos, after overthrowing Nikephoros III, made Nikephoros Diogenes doux of Crete. Nikephoros conspired against him in 1094, involving numerous confidants and relatives of Alexios, including Alexios' brother, Adrianos. For this conspiracy, he was blinded, in accordance with Byzantine traditions. After this, he retired to his estates, and spent the last years of his life studying classical literature.

== History ==
Nikephoros was born c. 1069 to Romanos IV Diogenes and Eudokia Makrembolitissa, who married and were crowned on 1 January 1068. Nikephoros was presumably elevated to junior emperor shortly after alongside his brother (and possibly twin) Leo Diogenes. (Note: They both wore the diadem and tzangion ("red sandals") reserved to emperors.) Although his half-brother Constantine Diogenes was the eldest son, he was borne of Romanos' first wife Anne, who was the daughter of Alusian of Bulgaria, and therefore was excluded from the succession when Romanos married Eudokia. Nikephoros and Leo were removed as co-emperor in 1071, after the deposition of their parents by Michael VII Doukas. Michael ruled until March 1078, when Nikephoros III Botaneiates overthrew him. Nikephoros III was himself overthrown by Alexios I Komnenos in 1081. Alexios is said to have treated the sons of Diogenes, including Nikephoros, "as if they were his own". Nikephoros was made doux of Crete by Alexios I Komnenos sometime in the early 1090s, likely either 1089–1091 or 1092–1094. He was also probably granted significant estates in Crete at the same time as his appointment.

In June 1094 Nikephoros began to conspire against Alexios, seeking to kill him and install himself as emperor. Because he was a porphyrogenitos, being born to Romanos while he was still reigning, he had more legitimacy than Alexios, who was only related by blood to the throne through his uncle Isaac I Komnenos. Nikephoros was also described as having many positive characteristics, such as natural charm, magnetic personality, and good looks. In her Alexiad, Anna Komnene, the daughter of Alexios, describes him:

He was physically strong and boasted that he rivaled the Giants; a broad-chested, blond man, a head taller than others of his generation.

— Anna Komnene, Alexiad, Book IX.6

Nikephoros' revolt involved a huge number of Alexios' confidants and relatives, including former Empress Maria of Alania, Alexios' brother-in-law Michael Taronites, and indeed Alexios' full brother Adrianos Komnenos. The full list of names of conspirators is not known, but they are known to include leading members of the senate, army officers, and powerful aristocrats. Very few names are given by Anna Komnene, although it is considered likely this was more because the full extent was an embarrassment than her own lack of knowledge.

Nikephoros twice attempted to assassinate Alexios in person, however, the first time he was not able to do so because of the presence of a maid fanning mosquitoes off of the emperor, and the second time he was halted by a guard. Alexios became suspicious of Nikephoros, and ordered his brother Adrianos to investigate. Adrianos, who was already a member of the conspiracy, reported that he found nothing suspicious. Alexios, still suspicious, then arrested Nikephoros, and after being tortured, Nikephoros confessed the full extent of the conspiracy. Nikephoros was blinded in 1094 for conspiring against Alexios, which was a standard punishment for conspirators in Byzantine culture. The punishments inflicted upon the others conspirators are not fully known, however Alexios' brother Adrianos disappears from history after the conspiracy was discovered, and Michael Taronites was only spared by the intervention of his wife, Maria Komnene, who was the sister of Alexios.

Anna Komnene writes that though Alexios had Nikephoros blinded, he continued to care for Nikephoros afterwards, reinstating most of Nikephoros' possessions and trying to console him. However, Nikephoros was "frantic with grief, detested town-life and was fond of living on his own estate", to which he retired not long after his blinding. He spent the remaining years of his life there, studying classical literature and philosophy, which were necessarily read aloud to him. He also became proficient in geometry, by having a tutor make geometrical models for him in relief or 3D. Despite these distractions, Nikephoros "never forgot his old grudge against the Emperor, but nourished throughout a smouldering expectation of royal power", and apparently plotted against him one last time; a friend in whom Nikephoros had confided informed Alexios of the plot, but Nikephoros gave up all the details when summoned for questioning, and was eventually pardoned. Nothing more is heard of Nikephoros after 1094.

== Bibliography ==
- Bartusis, Mark C. (2012). Land and Privilege in Byzantium: The Institution of Pronoia. Cambridge University Press. ISBN 9781107009622.
- Komnene, Anna (2009) [1148]. Sewter, E.R.A. (ed.). The Alexiad. Penguin UK. ISBN 9780141904542.
- Frankopan, Peter (2012). The First Crusade The Call from the East. De Gruyter. ISBN 9780674064997.
- Harris, Jonathan (2017). Constantinople: Capital of Byzantium. Bloomsbury Publishing. ISBN 9781474254663.
- Holmes, Catherine (2005). Basil II and the Governance of Empire (976-1025) (2005 ed.). Oxford University Press. ISBN 0-19-927968-3.
- Jotischky, Andrew (2014). Crusading and the Crusader States. Routledge. ISBN 9781317876021.
- Madgearu, Alexandru (2013). Byzantine Military Organization on the Danube, 10th-12th Centuries. BRILL. ISBN 9789004252493.
- Madgearu, Alexandru (2016). The Asanids: The Political and Military History of the Second Bulgarian Empire (1185-1280). Brill. ISBN 9789004333192.
- Neville, Leonora, ed. (2012). Heroes and Romans in Twelfth-Century Byzantium: The Material for History of Nikephoros Bryennios. Cambridge University Press. ISBN 9781107009455.
- Norwich, John Julius (1993), Byzantium: The Apogee, Penguin, ISBN 0-14-011448-3
- Norwich, John J. (1995), Byzantium: The Decline and Fall, Alfred A. Knopf, Inc., ISBN 978-0-679-41650-0
- Skoulatos, Basile (1980). Les personnages byzantins de l'Alexiade: Analyse prosopographique et synthèse [The Byzantine Personalities of the Alexiad: Prosopographical Analysis and Synthesis] (in French). Louvain-la-Neuve and Louvain: Bureau du Recueil Collège Érasme and Éditions Nauwelaerts.
- Varzos, Konstantinos (1984). Η Γενεαλογία των Κομνηνών [The Genealogy of the Komnenoi] (PDF) (in Greek). Vol. A1. Thessaloniki: Centre for Byzantine Studies, University of Thessaloniki.
