= Romanos IV Diogenes =

Byzantine emperor from 1068 to 1071

- Emperor and Autocrat of the Romans
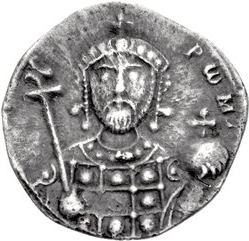
- A silver 1/3 miliaresion of Romanos IV Diogenes

Byzantine emperor
- Reign: 1 January 1068 – 1 October 1071
- Predecessor: Eudokia (disputed)
- Successor: Eudokia (disputed) and Michael VII
- Co-emperors: See list: Michael VII Doukas; Konstantios Doukas; Andronikos Doukas; Leo Diogenes; Nikephoros Diogenes
- Born: c. 1030; Cappadocia
- Died: 4 August 1072 (aged 41/42); Prote
- Burial: Monastery of the Transfiguration
- Spouse: Anne Alusiane of Bulgaria; Eudokia Makrembolitissa
- Issue: By Anne: Constantine Diogenes; By Eudocia: Nikephoros Diogenes; Leo Diogenes
- House: Diogenes
- Father: Constantine Diogenes
- Mother: ... Argyra
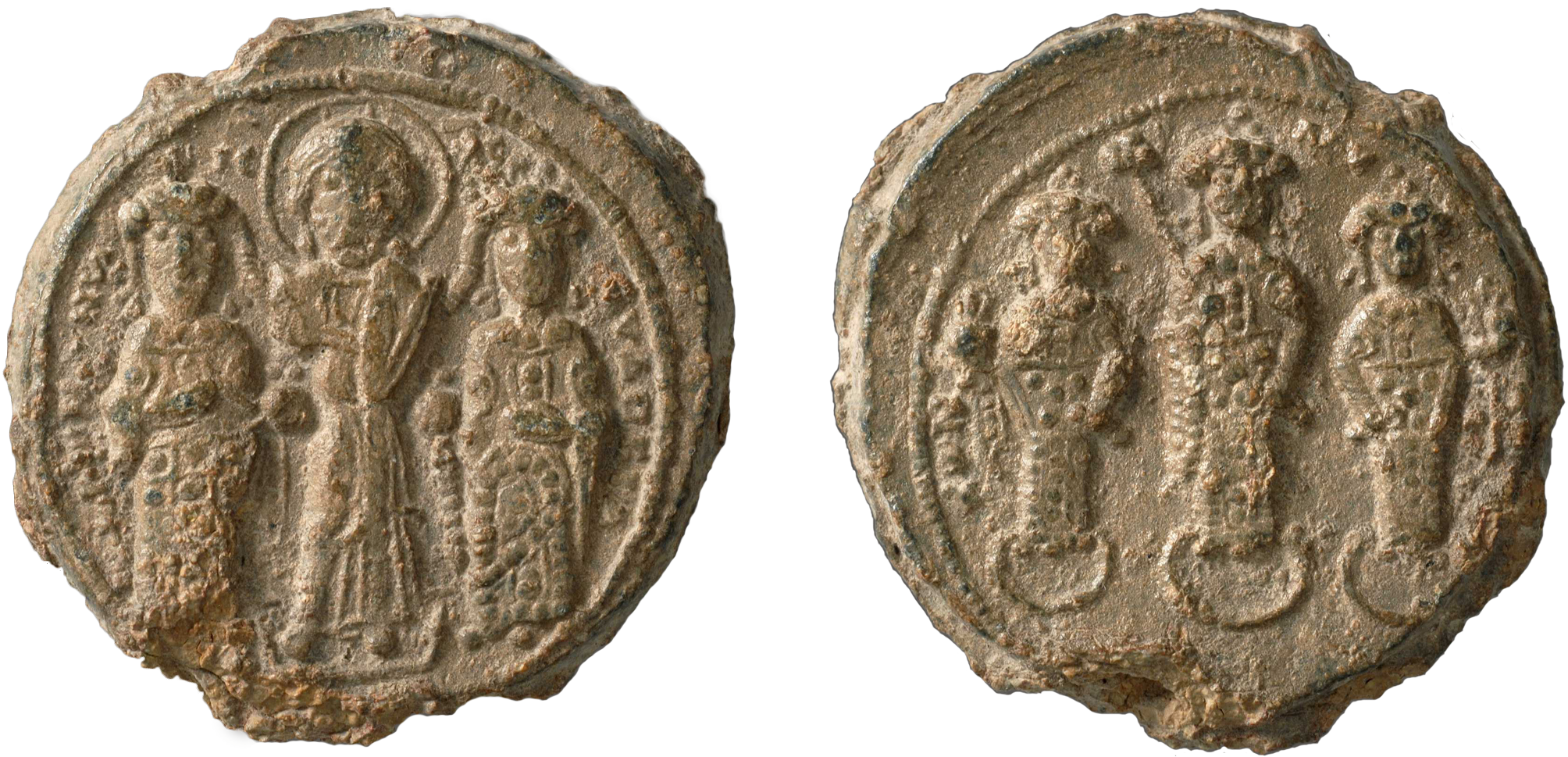
- Seal

Romanos IV Diogenes (Greek: Ῥωμανός Διογένης, romanized: Rōmanos Diogenēs; (c. 1030 – 4 August 1072) was Byzantine emperor from 1068 to 1071. Determined to halt the decline of the Byzantine military and to stop Turkish incursions into the empire, he is nevertheless best known for his defeat and capture in 1071 at the Battle of Manzikert, which played a major role in undermining Byzantine authority in Anatolia and allowed for its gradual Turkification.

Son of the general Constantine Diogenes and a prominent member of the Cappadocian Greek military aristocracy, Romanos rose to fame as a successful Akritai commander, serving in Syria and on the Danubian frontier. In 1068, he was crowned Byzantine emperor following his marriage to the dowager empress Eudokia Makrembolitissa. Early in his reign, Romanos campaigned with limited success against the Seljuk Turks in Anatolia and Syria. Domestically, his rule was marked by a series of unpopular policies as well as clashes with the rival Doukas family. In 1071, Romanos undertook another major campaign against the Seljuks. His Byzantine army, beset by years of neglect and poor tactics, was decisively defeated by the forces of Alp Arslan at Manzikert. Romanos himself was taken prisoner.

Taking advantage of his capture, members of the Doukas family declared Romanos deposed and proclaimed Michael VII Doukas as emperor in a palace coup. When released, he was ultimately defeated by the Doukai in Cilicia and forced to surrender. Despite receiving a promise that he would be spared, Romanos was blinded and exiled to a monastery on Prote in the Sea of Marmara, where he died of his wounds in 1072.

== Accession to the throne ==
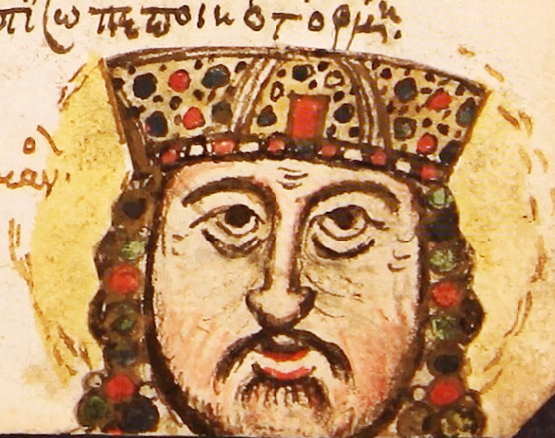
Romanos IV pictured in the 15th century Codex Mutinensis graecus

Romanos Diogenes was the son of Constantine Diogenes and a member of a prominent and powerful Byzantine Greek family from Cappadocia, the Diogenai, connected by birth to most of the great aristocratic nobles in Asia Minor. His mother was a daughter of Basil Argyros, brother of the emperor Romanos III. Courageous and generous, but also impetuous, Romanos rose with distinction in the army due to his military talents, and he served in Syria and on the Danubian frontier. At that time some parts from the theme of Bulgaria were organized as a new province with the centre at Serdica, and he became a duke of that province in 1067. However, he was eventually convicted of attempting to usurp the throne of the sons of Constantine X Doukas in 1067. While waiting to receive his sentence from the regent Eudokia Makrembolitissa, he was summoned into her presence and advised that she had pardoned him and that she had furthermore chosen him to be her husband and the guardian of her sons as emperor. She took this course of action primarily due to her concern that unless she managed to find a powerful husband, she could easily lose the regency to any unscrupulous noble, and also because she was infatuated with the popular Romanos. Her decision was met with little protest as the Seljuk Turks had overrun much of Cappadocia and had even taken the important city of Caesarea, meaning that the army needed to be placed under the command of an able and energetic general.

After a written oath promising never to remarry, extracted from Eudokia by Constantine X, had been set aside by the Patriarch of Constantinople, John Xiphilinos, and the approval of the senate obtained, on 1 January 1068 Romanos married the empress and was crowned Emperor of the Romans.

== Physical appearance and personality ==
Byzantine Empress Eudokia Makrembolitissa was infatuated with Romanos; for according to Attaleiates, “The man not only surpassed others in his good qualities but he was also pleasant to look at in all respects.” He was, however, “very harsh and violent in his judgments,” says Michael the Syrian, and he once ordered the nose of a soldier to be cut off for stealing the donkey of a Muslim after the emperor had given his peace. "One thing alone satisfied him: that he marched against his foes". He was said to have been very brave, and would often go unarmed and without escort to fight with his enemies which would cause his worried generals to complain. Psellus confirms that Romanus “exposed himself to danger without a thought of the consequences”.

I who was present [during an enemy surrender] did not approve of the simplicity of the emperor who mingled without body armour among murderous men who pass their lives in recklessness and madness

— Michael Attaleiates

Romanos grew contemptuous of the empress Eudokia for trying to control him.

The more she tried to dominate him, to treat him, who was really her master, like a lion in a cage, the more he fretted at her restraining influence and glared at the hand that kept him in check,” writes Psellus, who knew them both. “To begin with, he growled inwardly, but as time passed his disgust became obvious to everyone

== Campaigns against the Turks ==
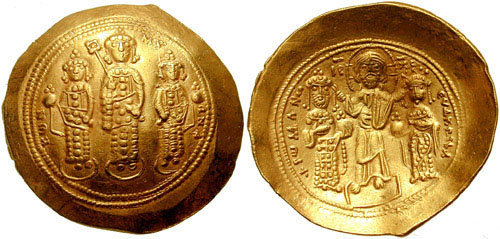
Gold histamenon of Romanos IV: Michael VII Doukas flanked by his brothers Andronikos and Konstantios on the obverse, Romanos IV and Eudokia Makrembolitissa crowned by Christ on the reverse

Romanos IV was now the senior emperor and guardian of his stepsons and junior co-emperors, Michael VII, Konstantios, and Andronikos Doukas. However, his elevation had antagonised not only the Doukas family, in particular the Caesar, John Doukas who led the opposition of the palace officials to Romanos's authority, but also the Varangian Guard, who openly expressed their discontent at the marriage of Eudokia. Romanos therefore decided that he could only exercise his authority by placing himself at the head of the army in the field, thereby focusing the whole government's attention on the war against the Turks.

By 1067, the Turks had been making incursions at will into Mesopotamia, Melitene, Syria, Cilicia, and Cappadocia, culminating with the sack of Caesarea and the plundering of the Church of Saint Basil. That winter they camped on the frontiers of the empire and waited for the next year's campaigning season. Romanos was confident of Byzantine superiority on the field of battle, looking on the Turks as little more than hordes of robbers who would melt away at the first encounter. He did not take into account the degraded state of the Byzantine forces, which had suffered years of neglect from his predecessors, in particular Constantine X Doukas. His forces, mostly composed of Sclavonian, Armenian, Bulgarian, and Frankish mercenaries, were ill-disciplined, disorganised, and uncoordinated, and he was not prepared to spend time in upgrading the arms, armour, or tactics of the once-feared Byzantine army. (Note: In the 2022 anthology The Worst Military Leaders in History, historian Andrew Holt argues that Romanos's insufficient attention to these issues was the chief reason for his defeat at Manzikert.)

=== Campaign of 1068 ===
The first military operations of Romanos did achieve a measure of success, reinforcing his opinions about the outcome of the war. Antioch was exposed to the Saracens of Aleppo who, with help from Turkish troops, began an attempt to reconquer the Byzantine province of Syria. Romanos began marching to the southeastern frontier of the empire to deal with this threat, but as he was advancing towards Lykandos, he received word that a Seljuk army had made an incursion into Pontus and had plundered Neocaesarea. Immediately he selected a small mobile force and quickly raced through Sebaste and the mountains of Tephrike to encounter the Turks on the road, forcing them to abandon their plunder and release their prisoners, though a large number of the Turkish troops managed to escape.

Returning south, Romanos rejoined the main army, and they continued their advance through the passes of Mount Taurus to the north of Germanicia and proceeded to invade the Emirate of Aleppo. Romanos captured Hierapolis, which he fortified to provide protection against further incursions into the south-eastern provinces of the empire. He then engaged in further fighting against the Saracens of Aleppo, but neither side managed a decisive victory. With the campaigning season reaching its end, Romanos returned north via Alexandretta and the Cilician Gates to Podandos. Here he was advised of another Seljuk Turkish raid into Asia Minor in which they sacked Amorium but returned to their base so fast that Romanos was in no position to give chase. He eventually reached Constantinople by January 1069.

=== Campaign of 1069 ===
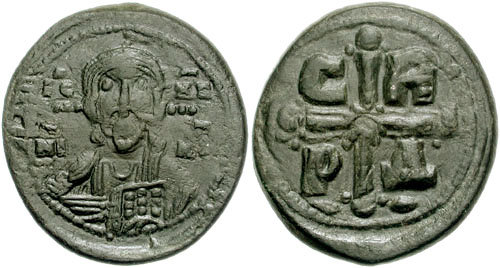
Copper follis of Romanos IV. The obverse shows Christ Pantokrator, while the reverse depicts a cross quartered with the letters ϹΒΡΔ for the motto Σταυρὲ σου βοήθει Ρωμανόν δεσπότην ("Thy Cross aid the Lord Romanos").

Plans for the following year's campaigning were initially thrown into chaos by a rebellion by one of Romanos's Norman mercenaries, Robert Crispin, who led a contingent of Frankish troops in the pay of the empire. Possibly due to Romanos not paying them on time, they began plundering the countryside near where they were stationed at Edessa, and attacking the imperial tax collectors. Although Crispin was captured and exiled to Abydos, the Franks continued to ravage the Armeniac Theme for some time. In the meantime, the land around Caesarea was again overrun by the Turks, forcing Romanos to spend precious time and energy in expelling the Turks from Cappadocia. Desperate to begin his campaign proper, he ordered the execution of all prisoners, even a Seljuk chieftain who offered to pay an immense ransom for his life. Having brought a measure of peace to the province, Romanos marched towards the Euphrates via Melitene, and crossed the river at Romanopolis, hoping to take Akhlat on Lake Van and thus protect the Armenian frontier.

Romanos placed himself at the head of a substantial body of troops and began his march towards Akhlat, leaving the bulk of the army under the command of Philaretos Brachamios with orders to defend the Mesopotamian frontier. Philaretos was soon defeated by the Turks, whose sack of Iconium forced Romanos to abandon his plans and return to Sebaste. He sent orders to the Dux of Antioch to secure the passes at Mopsuestia, while he attempted to run down the Turks at Heracleia. The Turks were soon hemmed in in the mountains of Cilicia, but they managed to escape to Aleppo after abandoning their plunder. Romanos once again returned to Constantinople without the great victory he was hoping for.

== Affairs at Constantinople ==
Romanos was detained at Constantinople in 1070, while he dealt with many outstanding administrative issues, including the imminent fall of Bari into Norman hands. They had been besieging it since 1068, but it had taken Romanos two years to respond. He ordered a relief fleet to set sail, containing sufficient provisions and troops to enable them to hold out for much longer. The fleet was intercepted, however, and defeated by a Norman squadron under the command of Roger, the younger brother of Robert Guiscard, forcing the final remaining outpost of Byzantine authority in Italy to surrender on 15 April 1071.

Meanwhile, Romanos was undertaking a number of unpopular reforms at home. He reduced a great deal of unnecessary public expenditure on court ceremonials and beautifying the capital. He reduced the public salaries paid to much of the court nobility, as well as reducing the profits of tradesmen. His preoccupation with the military had also made him unpopular with the provincial governors and the military hierarchy, as he was determined to ensure they could not abuse their positions, especially through corrupt practices. He incurred the displeasure of the mercenaries by enforcing much needed discipline. Romanos was also deeply unpopular with the common people, as he neglected to entertain them with games at the hippodrome, nor did he alleviate the burdens of the peasants in the provinces.

Nevertheless, he did not forget his principal target, the Turks. Being unable to go on campaign himself, he entrusted the imperial army to one of his generals, Manuel Komnenos, nephew of the former emperor Isaac I, and elder brother to the future emperor Alexios. He managed to engage the Turks in battle, but was defeated and taken prisoner by a Turkish general named Khroudj. Manuel convinced Khroudj to go to Constantinople and see Romanos in person to conclude an alliance, which was soon completed. This act motivated the Seljuk Sultan Alp Arslan to attack the Byzantine Empire, besieging and capturing the important Byzantine fortresses of Manzikert and Archesh. Romanos, in return, offered to officially exchange Manzikert and Archesh for Hieropolis in Syria, which Romanos had taken three years previously.

== Battle of Manzikert and capture by Alp Arslan ==
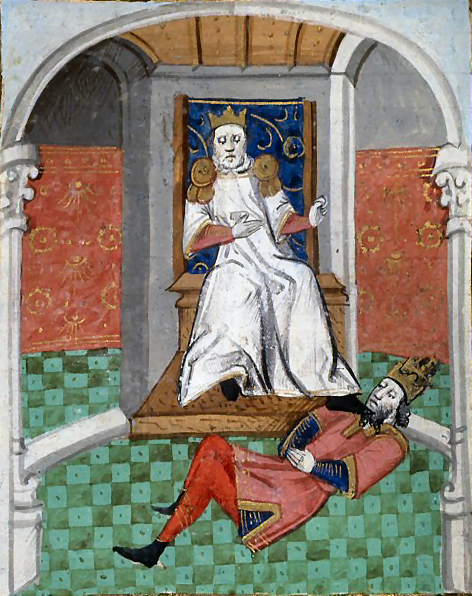
Alp Arslan humiliating Emperor Romanos IV. From a 15th-century illustrated French translation of Boccaccio's De Casibus Virorum Illustrium.

Early in the spring of 1071, whilst conducting negotiations with Alp Arslan over Manzikert, Romanos marched at the head of a large army with the intent of recovering the fortress. It was soon evident that the army had a serious discipline problem, with soldiers regularly pillaging the area around their nightly camps. When Romanos attempted to enforce some stricter discipline, a whole regiment of German mercenaries mutinied, which the emperor only managed to control with the greatest difficulty. Believing that Alp Arslan was nowhere near Manzikert, he decided to divide his army. One part of the army he dispatched to attack Akhlat, at that time in possession of the Turks. Romanos himself advanced with the main body of the army on Manzikert, which he soon recaptured. At this point his advance guard met the Seljuk army, which was rapidly approaching Manzikert. Romanos ordered the forces attacking Akhlat to rejoin the army, but their portion of the army unexpectedly came across another large Turkish army, so Romanos's troops retreated toward Mesopotamia. Already understrength, Romanos's army was further weakened when his Uzes mercenaries deserted to the Turks. Arslan had no desire to take on the Byzantine army, so he proposed a peace treaty with favourable terms for Romanos. Michael Attaleiates claims that the Muslim envoy that was sent to Romanos was in reality, only there to stall for more time for the Seljuk army. One Muslim source confirms that the peace mission was a ploy “to discover their [military] condition”. The emperor, eager for a decisive military victory, rejected the offer, and both armies lined up for a battle, which took place on 26 August 1071. The battle lasted all day without either side gaining any decisive advantage, until the emperor ordered a part of his centre to return to camp. The order was misunderstood by the right wing, however, and Andronikos Doukas, who commanded the reserves, and was the son of Caesar John Doukas, took advantage of the confusion to betray Romanos. Claiming that Romanos was dead, he marched away from the battle with some 30,000 men, instead of covering the emperor's retreat.

When Romanos discovered what had happened, he tried to recover the situation by making a defiant stand. He fought on valiantly after his horse was killed under him, killing many enemies and causing others to flee, but he received a wound in the hand, which prevented him from wielding a sword, and he was soon taken prisoner.

A number of other sources speak of the valor shown by Romanos at Manzikert: Romanos “launched himself into the thick of the battle. He knocked down several very valiant Persian fighters and caused disarray in their ranks,” according to a contemporary Armenian account. Michael Psellus, who was normally critical, begrudgingly writes, “According to my several informants he actually killed many of them and put others to flight”

According to a number of Byzantine historians, including John Skylitzes, Arslan at first had difficulty believing the dusty and tattered warrior brought before him was the Roman emperor. Romanos and Arslan never expected to meet each other under such circumstances. He then stepped down from his seat and placed his foot on Romanos's neck. After this sign of ritual humiliation, however, Arslan raised Romanos from the ground and ordered him to be treated like a king. From then on he treated him with extreme kindness, never saying a cruel word to him during the Emperor's eight-day stay in his camp. He then released the Emperor in exchange for a treaty and the promise of a hefty ransom. At first Alp Arslan suggested a ransom of 10,000,000 nomismata to Romanos IV, but he later reduced it to 1,500,000 nomismata, with a further 360,000 nomismata annually.

It is reported that upon seeing the Roman emperor, the sultan leapt from his throne like a mad man, commanded Romanos to kiss the ground, and stepped on his neck. He repeatedly berated the emperor, including for spurning his emissaries and offers of peace. The unrepentant Romanos was laconic, and deigned only to offer the curtest responses to his captor's fiery upbraiding. He merely had done what was “possible for a man, and which kings are bound to do, and I have fallen short in nothing. But God has fulfilled his will. And now, do what you wish and abandon recriminations.”

Other Muslim sources claim Alp Arslan treated Romanos in a harsh and petty way. “You are too trivial in my view for me to kill you,” the sultan is said to have declared before his Turks in Muslim sources. “Take him to the person who pays most.” When no one reportedly wanted to purchase the “Dog of the Romans,” Alp Arslan scoffed that that was “because the dog is better than he is!” “He struck him three or four blows with his hand and when Romanos collapsed he kicked him a similar number of times”; he “put him in chains and fettered his hand to his neck”; he pulled his hair and put his face to the ground, while informing him, “your troops are food for the Muslims.”

Wanting to test the Roman, Alp Arslan then asked Romanos what he would do to him if he was his prisoner, Romanos frankly answered "the worst!". The answer impressed Alp Arslan and he said "Ah! by Allah! He has spoken the truth! If he had spoken otherwise, he would be lying. This is an intelligent, tough man. It is not permissible that he should be killed." After agreeing on a ransom, Alp Arslan then sent emperor Romanos back to Constantinople with a Turkish escort that carried a banner above the disgraced emperor that read: "There is no god but Allah and Muhammad is his messenger".

== Betrayal ==
In the meantime, the opposition faction scheming against Romanos IV decided to exploit the situation. Declaring Romanos deposed, Michael VII was proclaimed emperor on c. 1 October 1071. (Note: The date was traditionally given as 24 September 1071 based on Michael Attaliates statement that Michael VII reigned "6 years and 6 months", reckoning from his deposition on 24 March according to the same author.) Eudokia co-ruled with Michael VII for a month, (Note: The joint rule of Eudokia and Michael VII is dated differently by various scholars: Muralt dates it in 24 September – 24 October 1071, Schreiner dates it in 1 October – 1 November 1071, and Polemis dates it in late September – late October 1071.) after which the caesar John Doukas and Michael Psellos forced her to retire to a monastery. They then refused to honor the agreement made between Arslan and the former emperor. Romanos soon returned, and he and the Doukas family gathered troops. A battle was fought between Constantine, Andronikos Doukas and Romanos. Romanos was defeated and retreated to the fortress of Tyropoion, and from there to Adana in Cilicia. Pursued by Andronikos, he was eventually forced to surrender by the garrison at Adana upon receiving assurances of his personal safety. Before leaving the fortress, he collected all the money he could lay his hands on and sent it to the Sultan as proof of his good faith, along with a message: "As emperor, I promised you a ransom of a million and a half. Dethroned, and about to become dependent upon others, I send you all I possess as proof of my gratitude".

Andronikos stipulated that his life would be spared if he resigned the purple and retired into a monastery. Romanos agreed, and this agreement was ratified at Constantinople. However, John Doukas reneged on the agreement and sent men to ambush and have Romanos cruelly blinded on 29 June 1072 in Kotyaion. According to Attaleiates, the emperor was led away, pleading for mercy. Per Attaleiates, "when he arose, his eyes were drenched with blood, a pathetic and pitiable sight that made everyone who saw it cry uncontrollably." He was then sent into exile to Prote in the Sea of Marmara. Without medical assistance, his wound became infected, and he soon endured a painfully lingering death. The final insult was given a few days before his death, when Romanos received a letter from Michael Psellos, congratulating him on the loss of his eyes. He finally died, praying for the forgiveness of his sins, and his widow Eudokia was permitted to honor his remains with a magnificent funeral.

== Family ==
By his first wife, Anne, daughter of Alusian of Bulgaria, Romanos IV Diogenes had at least one son:

- Constantine Diogenes, who was married to Theodora, sister of Alexios I Komnenos. This marriage was arranged by Anna Dalassena after the death of Romanos IV, but it was short-lived, as Constantine perished under the walls of Antioch in 1073 while serving with his brother-in-law Isaac Komnenos.

By his second wife, the Empress Eudokia Makrembolitissa, he had:

- Leo Diogenes – born in 1069, and according to Anna Comnena was made co-emperor during his father's reign. In the reign of Alexius I, he was taken into the imperial palace and given various high commands. He died in Alexius's campaigns against the Pechenegs in 1087.
- Nikephoros Diogenes – born in 1069, made co-emperor upon his birth.

== In popular culture ==
A highly fictionalized version of Romanos IV was portrayed by Nikolai Kinski in the 2022 Netflix series Vikings: Valhalla. The series is mostly set decades before Romanos acceded to the throne.

== See also ==
- List of Byzantine emperors

== Bibliography ==
=== Primary sources ===
- Comnena, Anna, The Alexiad

=== Secondary sources ===
- Cheynet, J. C.; Vannier, J. F. (2003), "Les Argyroi", Zbornik Radova Vizantološkog Instituta (in French), vol. 40, pp. 57–90
- Çoban, R. V. (2020). The Manzikert Battle and Sultan Alp Arslan with European Perspective in the 15st Century in the Miniatures of Giovanni Boccaccio's "De Casibus Virorum Illustrium"s 226 and 232. French Manuscripts in Bibliothèque Nationale de France. S. Karakaya ve V. Baydar (Ed.), in 2nd International Muş Symposium Articles Book (pp. 48–64). Muş: Muş Alparslan University. Source
- Dumbarton Oaks (1973), Catalogue of the Byzantine Coins in the Dumbarton Oaks Collection and in the Whittemore Collection: Leo III to Nicephorus III, 717–1081, p. 785
- Finlay, George (1854), History of the Byzantine and Greek Empires from 1057 to 1453, vol. 2, William Blackwood & Sons
- Garland, Lynda (25 May 2007), Anna Dalassena, Mother of Alexius I Comnenus (1081–1118), De Imperatoribus Romanis, archived from the original on 23 October 2007
- Jeffreys, C., ed. (2016). Romanos 4. King's College London. ISBN 978-1-908951-20-5.
- Kazhdan, Alexander, ed. (1991), "Romanos IV Diogenes", Oxford Dictionary of Byzantium, Oxford University Press, p. 1807, ISBN 978-0195046526
- Norwich, John Julius (1993), Byzantium: The Apogee, Penguin, ISBN 0140114483
- Norwich, John Julius (1993b) [1992], Byzantium: The Apogee, vol. II
- Soloviev, A. V. (1935), "Les emblèmes héraldiques de Byzance et les Slaves", Seminarium Kondakovianum (in French), 7: 119–164
- Schreiner, Peter (1975). Die byzantinischen Kleinchroniken I [Byzantine small chronicles 1]. Corpus Fontium Historiae Byzantinae. Vienna: ÖAW. ISBN 978-3-7001-0206-9.
- Schreiner, Peter (1977). Die byzantinischen Kleinchroniken II: Historischer Kommentar [Byzantine small chronicles 2: Historical commentary]. CFHB (in German). Vienna: ÖAW. ISBN 978-3-7001-0206-9.

Romanos IV Diogenes Doukid dynasty Born: unknown Died: 1072
Regnal titles
Preceded by Eudokia (disputed)	Byzantine emperor 1068 – 1071	Succeeded by Eudokia (disputed) and Michael VII
