= Constantine Diogenes (son of Romanos IV) =

Son of Byzantine Emperor Romanos IV Diogenes

Constantine Diogenes (Greek: Κωνσταντίνος Διογένης; died 1073) was one of the sons of Byzantine Emperor Romanos IV Diogenes (reigned 1068–1071).

He was a son of Romanos with his first wife Anne, a daughter of Alusian, and hence excluded from the line of succession when his father married the empress-dowager Eudokia Makrembolitissa in 1068. He was named after his grandfather, general Constantine Diogenes (died 1032).

The then kouropalatissa Anna Dalassene (later, regent of the empire), wife of the brother of the late Emperor Isaac I Komnenos, despised the Doukas imperial family. According to perceptions of Anna Dalassene, the Doukas men had usurped the imperial dignity by tricking emperor Isaac into resigning and her husband, the kouropalates John Komnenos, into refusing the throne. Anna Dalassene expected the Doukas men to lead the country to military problems. Consequently, Anna Dalassene plotted with Romanos Diogenes and others to push the underage Michael VII Doukas aside. Romanos Diogenes was raised to the imperial throne, having to marry the Doukas dowager empress Eudokia Makrembolitissa. As a signal of strength of the allied supporters and Romanos IV, the marriage of Constantine Diogenes was arranged. Emperor Romanos' son received the daughter of kouropalates John Komnenos and kouropalatissa Anna Dalassene as his bride. The marriage was one of signals of the anti-Doukas camp. He was married to Theodora Komnene, sister of the later emperor Alexios I Komnenos (reigned 1081–1118), some time during his father's reign.

Constantine fell in battle in 1073. An adventurer pretended to be him or his brother in the 1090s, and invaded the Byzantine Empire with Cuman help in 1095.

== Sources ==
- Cheynet, Jean-Claude (1996). Pouvoir et Contestations à Byzance (963–1210) (in French). Paris, France: Publications de la Sorbonne. ISBN 978-2-85944-168-5.
- Neville, Leonora, ed. (2012). Heroes and Romans in Twelfth-Century Byzantium: The Material for History of Nikephoros Bryennios. Cambridge University Press. ISBN 9781107009455.
- Skoulatos, Basile (1980). Les personnages byzantins de l'Alexiade: Analyse prosopographique et synthèse [The Byzantine Personalities of the Alexiad: Prosopographical Analysis and Synthesis] (in French). Louvain-la-Neuve and Louvain: Bureau du Recueil Collège Érasme and Éditions Nauwelaerts. OCLC 8468871.
