= Konstantios Doukas =

Byzantine emperor from 1060 to 1078

- Emperor and Autocrat of the Romans
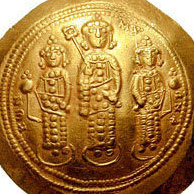
- Gold histamenon of Romanos IV: Michael VII flanked by his brothers Andronikos and Konstantios.

Byzantine co-emperor
- Reign: 1060–1078
- Predecessor: Michael VII Doukas
- Successor: Nikephoros III Botaneiates
- Co-emperors: Leo Diogenes (1070–1071); Nikephoros Diogenes (1070–1071); Michael VII Doukas (1071–1078); Constantine Doukas (1074–1078); Andronikos Doukas (1068–1070s)
- Born: 1060
- Died: 18 October 1081 (aged 20–21); Dyrrhachium
- Dynasty: Doukas
- Father: Constantine X Doukas
- Mother: Eudokia Makrembolitissa

Konstantios Doukas (Greek: Κωνστάντιος Δούκας, romanized: Kōnstantios Doúkās; 1060 – 18 October 1081), Latinized as Constantius Ducas, was a junior Byzantine emperor from 1060 to 1078. Konstantios was the son of Emperor Constantine X Doukas and Empress Eudokia Makrembolitissa. Upon his birth, he was elevated to junior emperor, along with his brother Michael VII. He remained as junior emperor during the reigns of Constantine, Romanos IV, and Michael VII. He was handed over to Nikephoros III, a usurper, following the abdication of Michael VII. He was sent to live in a monastery, where he stayed until recalled by Alexios I Komnenos, who made him a general. He was killed in 1081, in the Battle of Dyrrhachium. Sources sometimes confuse him with his nephew, Constantine Doukas.

== Life ==
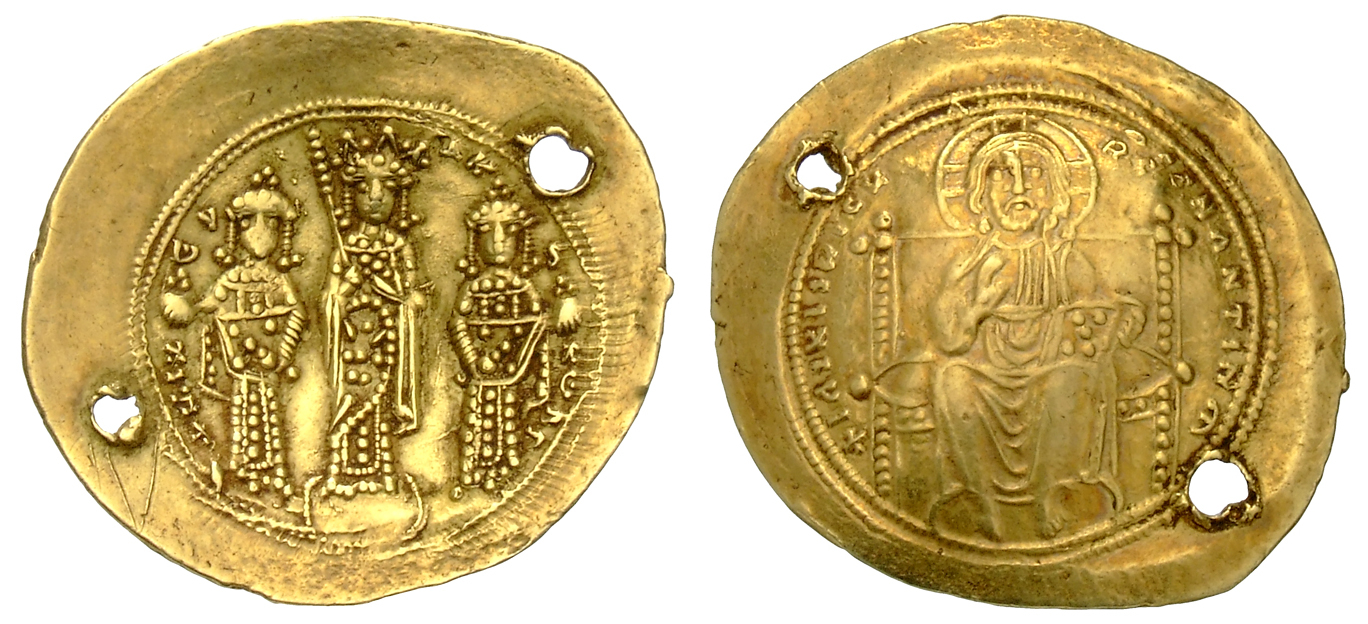
Coin of Eudokia, Michael VII and Konstantios, 1067.

Konstantios Doukas was born in 1060, the son of Emperor Constantine X Doukas and Empress Eudokia Makrembolitissa. He was born during Constantine's reign; meaning that he was a porphyrogennetos ("born in the purple"). His father became emperor on 24 November 1059, after Isaac I Komnenos selected him as his heir, shortly before Isaac abdicated.

Later in 1060, Constantine elevated both Michael VII and Konstantios to junior emperors under him, but did not elevate his middle son Andronikos Doukas to junior emperor, for unknown reasons. Konstantios retained his title of junior emperor during the reigns of Constantine (1060–1067), Romanos IV Diogenes (1068–1071), and Michael VII (1071–1078). Konstantios was engaged to Anna Vsevolodovna of Kiev in 1074.

Michael VII was forced to abdicated on 31 March 1078, due to a popular uprising and the two active revolts of Nikephoros III Botaneiates and Nikephoros Bryennios, retiring to the Monastery of Stoudios. Michael VII chose Konstantios to succeed him, as Andronikos had died a few years before this or he wasn't interested to throne. Konstantios technically became senior emperor following Michael's abdication. However, the Byzantine Senate had already declared Michael VII deposed on 7 January 1078. According to Michael Attaleiates, "they [the populace] kept the City in order without a ruler for three days".

Konstantios only had to contend with Nikephoros III, as Nikephoros Bryennios had been defeated by Nikephoros III at the Battle of Kalavrye, and subsequently blinded by him. Konstantios rapidly lost support, as it became clear he had no skill as a ruler. Upon Nikephoros III's entry into Constantinople on 3 April, Konstantios' supporters attempted to negotiate, but the populace of Constantinople rejected him completely. Later that year an Anatolian army rebelled in favour of Konstantios, but it was quickly defeated by Nikephoros' forces. Konstantios was sent to be tonsured and live in a monastery on one of the Princes' Islands in the Propontis. By becoming a monk he became unable to marry, and thus his engagement to Anna Vsevolodovna was cancelled.

He was recalled by Alexios I Komnenos, who succeeded Nikephoros, and who was related to Konstantios by way of his marriage to Irene Doukaina, in 1081. He was made a general, and sent to campaign against the Normans. After Alexios seized the throne, he elevated Constantine Doukas to co-emperor. Konstantios fought in the Battle of Dyrrhachium on 18 October 1081, where Byzantine forces besieging Dyrrachium were engaged by Norman forces. Although the Byzantines were initially successful, with the Norman right wing being routed by the Byzantine left wing, the Norman center routed the central forces of the Byzantines. During this engagement, the Varangian Guard, with whom Konstantios was fighting, was separated from the core body of the Byzantine army and massacred. Konstantios himself perished in the combat.

Due to the limited sources for Konstantios' life, he's often confused with his younger nephew, the porphyrogennetos Constantine Doukas. However, Constantine was only a child during this time (born in 1074), so contemporary sources most likely talk about Konstantios instead.

== Arts ==
Konstantios Doukas is thought to be engraved on the Holy Crown of Hungary, which was given to King Géza I of Hungary (r. 1074–1077) by Konstantios' brother Michael VII, depicted alongside King Geza I and Michael VII; although some argue that it actually depicts Constantine Doukas.

== Bibliography ==
- Attaleiates, Michael (2012) [1080]. The History. Dumbarton Oaks Medieval Library. Translated by Kaldellis, Anthony; Krallis, Dimitris. Cambridge, Massachusetts: Harvard University Press. ISBN 978-0-674-05799-9.
- Buckley, Penelope (2014). The Alexiad of Anna Komnene: Artistic Strategy In The Making Of A Myth. Cambridge University Press. ISBN 9781107037229.
- Bryennios, Nikephoros (1975) [1137]. History. Corpus Fontium Historiae Byzantinae (in French). Vol. 9. Brussels: De Gruyter. OCLC 651837383.
- Finlay, George (1844), History of the Byzantine and Greek Empires from 1057–1453, vol. 2, William Blackwood & Sons, OCLC 25020128
- Jeffreys, C., ed. (2016). "Konstantios 61". Prosopography of the Byzantine World. King's College London. ISBN 978-1-908951-20-5.
- Kaldellis, Anthony (2017). Streams of Gold, Rivers of Blood: The Rise and Fall of Byzantium, 955 A.D. to the First Crusade. Oxford University Press. ISBN 9780190253233.
- Kazhdan, Alexander, ed. (1991). Oxford Dictionary of Byzantium. Oxford: Oxford University Press. ISBN 978-0-19-504652-6.
- Norwich, John Julius (1993), Byzantium: The Apogee, Penguin, ISBN 0-14-011448-3
- Pevny, Olenka Z. (2000). Perceptions of Byzantium and Its Neighbors: 843-1261 : the Metropolitan Museum of Art Symposia. Metropolitan Museum of Art. ISBN 9780870999710.
- Psellos, Michael (1953) [1078]. Sewter, Edgar Robert Ashton (ed.). Chronographia. New Haven, Connecticut: Yale University Press. OCLC 422765673.
- Savvides, Alexios G.C. (2007). Byzantino-Normannica: The Norman Capture of Italy (to A. D. 1081) and the First Two Invasions in Byzantium (A.D. 1081-1085 and 1107-1108). Peeters Publishers. ISBN 9789042919112.
- Vernadsky, George (1976) [1948]. Kievan Russia. Yale University Press. ISBN 978-0300016475.
