= Constantine Doukas (co-emperor) =

Byzantine emperor (1074–1078, 1081–1087)

- Emperor and Autocrat of the Romans
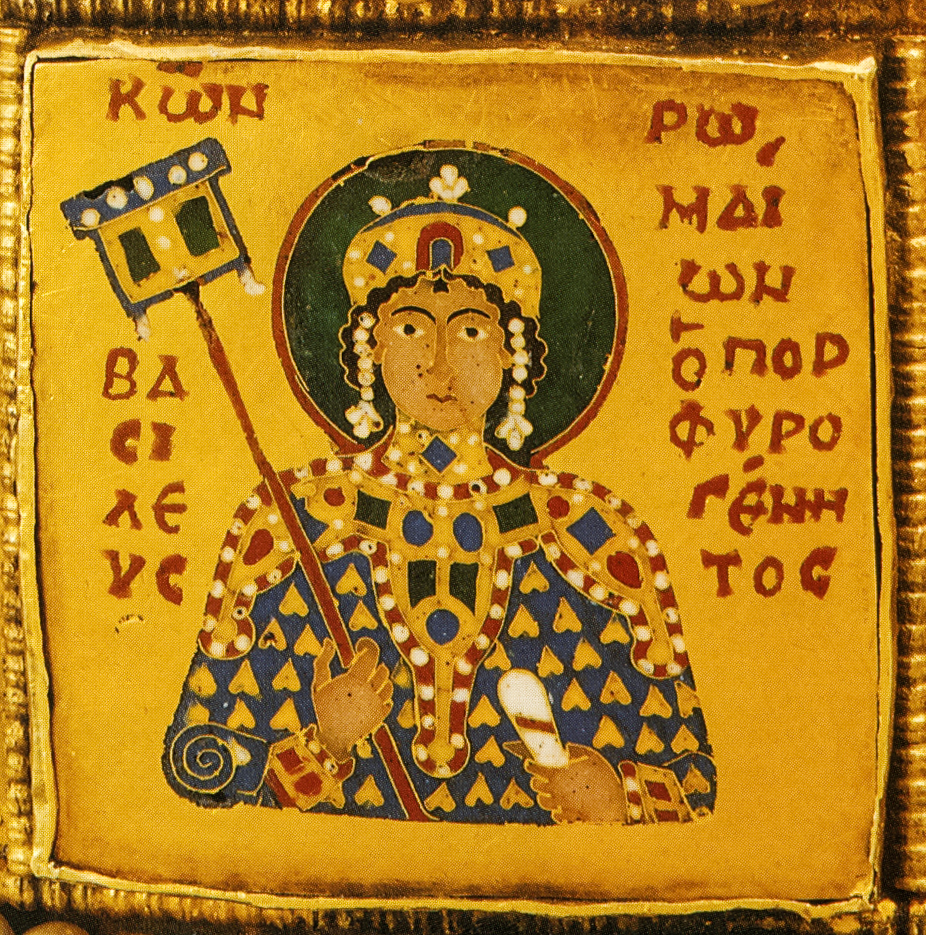
- Cloisonné engraving of Constantine Doukas from the Holy Crown of Hungary

Byzantine emperor
- Reign: c. 1074–1078
- Predecessor: Michael VII Doukas
- Successor: Nikephoros III Botaneiates
- Co-emperors: Michael VII (1071–1078); Konstantios (1071–1078); Andronikos (1068–1070s)
- 2nd reign: 1081–1087
- Predecessor: Nikephoros III Botaneiates
- Successor: Alexios I Komnenos
- Born: c. 1074
- Died: 12 August 1094 (aged about 20)
- Spouse: Anna Komnene
- Dynasty: Doukas
- Father: Michael VII Doukas
- Mother: Maria of Alania

Constantine Doukas or Ducas (Greek: Κωνσταντίνος Δούκας, romanized: Kōnstantīnos Doúkās; c. 1074 – 12 August 1094) was Byzantine junior emperor from 1074 to 1078, and again from 1081 to 1087. He was born to Emperor Michael VII Doukas and Empress Maria of Alania in about 1074, and elevated to junior emperor probably in the same year. He was junior emperor until 1078, when Michael VII was replaced by Nikephoros III Botaneiates. Because Constantine was not made junior emperor under Nikephoros III, his betrothal to Olympias, the daughter of Robert Guiscard, was broken, which Robert Guiscard used as a pretext to invade the Byzantine Empire. John Doukas forced Nikephoros to abdicate in favor of Alexios I Komnenos in 1081, and shortly afterwards Alexios elevated Constantine to junior emperor. Constantine married Alexios's daughter Anna Komnene, and remained junior emperor until 1087, when Alexios had a son, John II Komnenos. Constantine died in c. 1095.

== Life ==
Constantine Doukas was born in about 1074 to Byzantine Emperor Michael VII and his wife Maria of Alania, as a porphyrogennetos, meaning he was born during his father's reign. Constantine was crowned co-emperor by his father shortly after his birth, and was betrothed to Olympias, the daughter of Robert Guiscard, the Norman duke of Apulia. This arrangement was cancelled after Michael abdicated in 1078, whereupon Maria and Constantine retired to the Monastery of Petrion. Maria married Nikephoros III Botaneiates, who seized power after Michael's abdication, at the urging of Michael's uncle John Doukas, but was unable to convince him to elevate Constantine to junior emperor, thereby breaking the betrothal. Robert Guiscard therefore launched an invasion of the Byzantine Empire, using the broken betrothal as a pretext.

In order to combat this invasion, Alexios I Komnenos was given a large force to repel the Norman army led by Guiscard. John Doukas, who had previously urged Nikephoros to seize power, conspired against Nikephoros, intending to overthrow him and replace him with Alexios. Nikephoros, unable to form an alliance with either the Seljuks or Nikephoros Melissenos, was forced to abdicate to Alexios in 1081. After Alexios ascended the throne in 1081, he elevated Constantine to junior emperor, and betrothed his daughter Anna Komnene to him in 1083, shortly after her birth. However, he was replaced as junior emperor and favored heir by Alexios' son, John II Komnenos, in 1087, shortly after his birth to Alexios and Irene Doukaina. Constantine died on 12 August 1094.

== In arts ==
Constantine Doukas is thought to be engraved on the Holy Crown of Hungary, which was given to Hungarian King Géza I of Hungary by Constantine's father Michael VII, depicted alongside King Geza I and Michael VII; although the figure may actually be Konstantios Doukas.

Constantine Doukas (co-emperor) Doukid dynasty Born: 1074 Died: 1095
Regnal titles
Preceded by Michael VII Doukas	Byzantine emperor 1074–1078 with Michael VII Doukas 1071–1078	Succeeded by Nikephoros III
Preceded by Nikephoros III	Byzantine emperor 1081–1088 with Alexios I Komnenos 1081–1118	Succeeded by Alexios I Komnenos
