= Michael VII Doukas =

Byzantine emperor from 1071 to 1078

- Emperor and Autocrat of the Romans
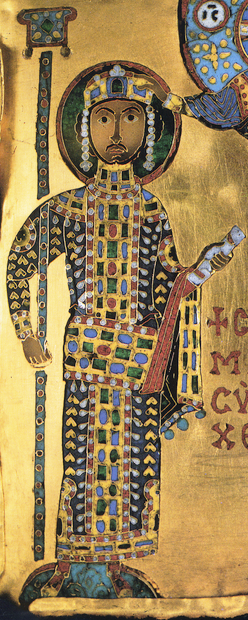
- A cloisonné engraving of Michael VII Doukas in full imperial regalia, as depicted in the Georgian Khakuli Triptych

Byzantine emperor
- Reign: 1 October 1071 – 24/31 March 1078
- Coronation: c. 1060 as co-emperor
- Predecessor: Romanos IV Diogenes
- Successor: Nikephoros III Botaneiates
- Co-sovereign: Eudokia Makrembolitissa (until 1 November 1071)
- Junior co-emperors: See list: Leo Diogenes; Nikephoros Diogenes; Konstantios Doukas; Andronikos Doukas; Constantine Doukas
- Born: c. 1050
- Died: 1090 (aged ~40)
- Spouse: Maria of Alania
- Issue: Constantine Doukas
- Dynasty: Doukid
- Father: Constantine X Doukas
- Mother: Eudokia Makrembolitissa
- Religion: Orthodox Christian
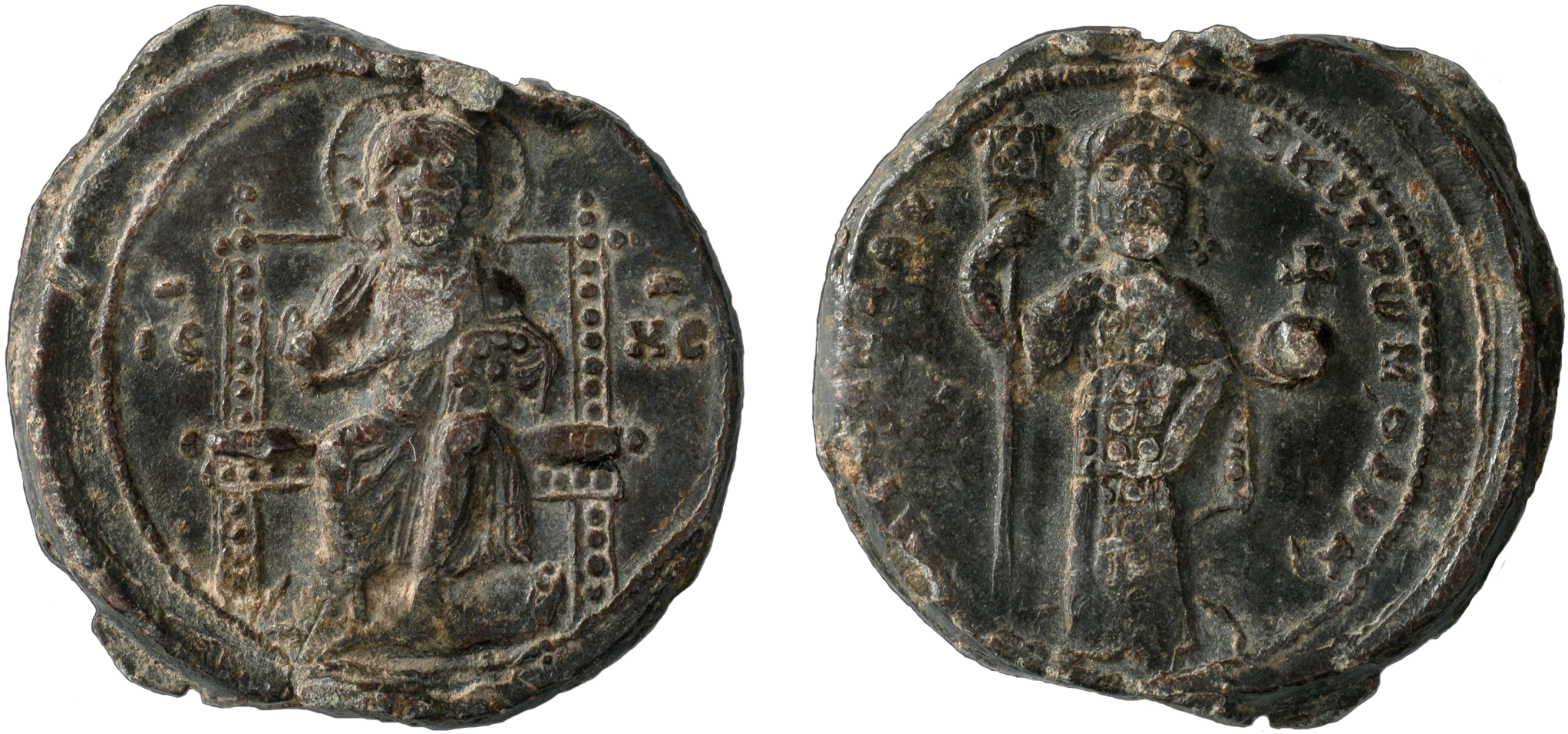
- Seal

Michael VII Doukas or Ducas (Greek: Μιχαὴλ Δούκας, romanized: Mikhaḕl Doúkās), nicknamed Parapinakes (Greek: Παραπινάκης, romanized: Parapinákes, lit. 'minus a quarter', a reference to the devaluation of the Byzantine currency under his rule), was the senior Byzantine emperor from 1071 to 1078. He was known as incompetent as an emperor and reliant on court officials, especially of his finance minister Nikephoritzes, who increased taxation and luxury spending while not properly financing their army (which later mutinied). Under his reign, Bari was lost and his empire faced open revolt in the Balkans. Along with the advancing Seljuk Turks in the eastern front, Michael also had to contend with his mercenaries openly turning against the empire. Michael stepped down as emperor in 1078 and later retired to a monastery.

== Life ==
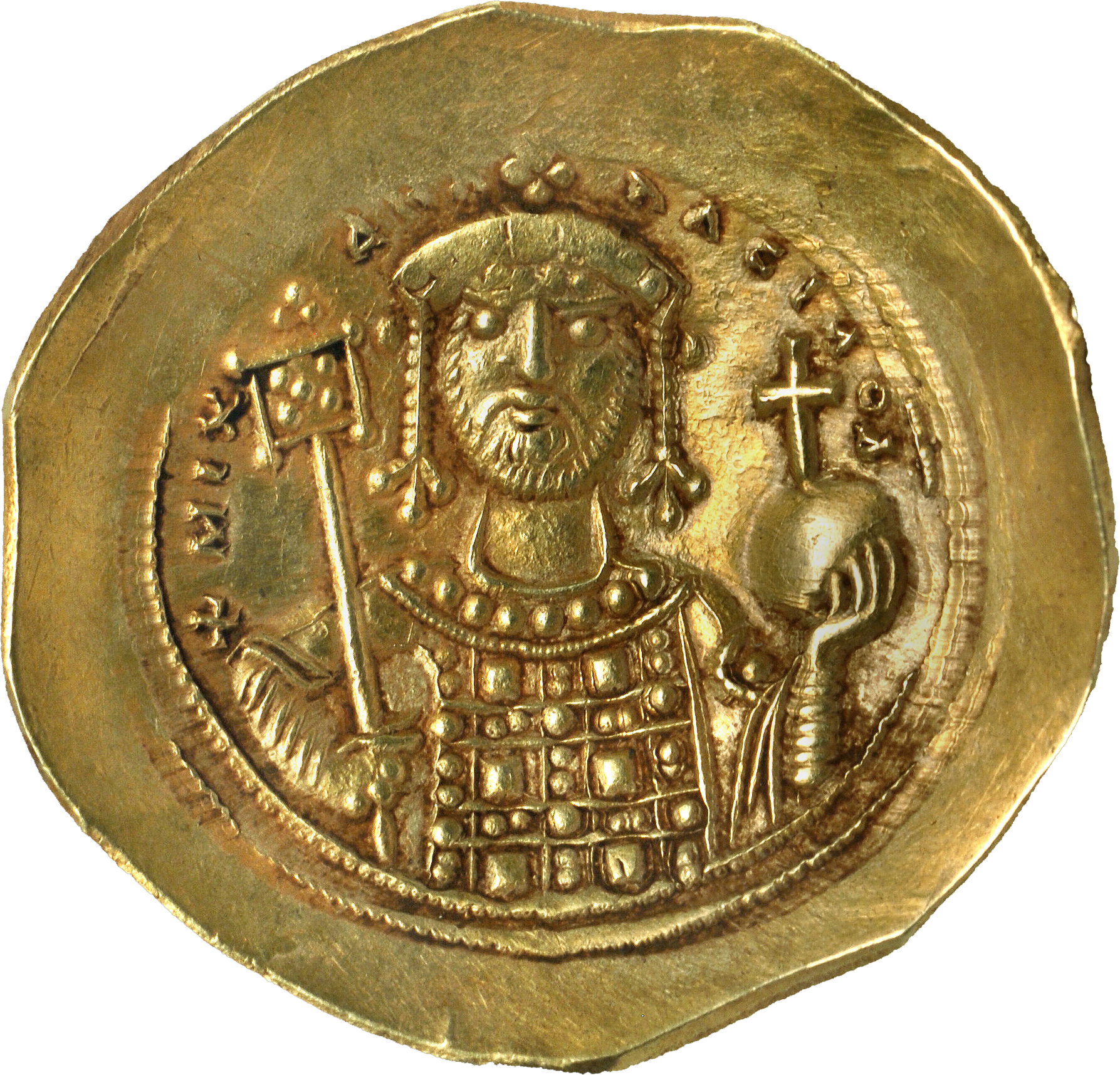
Histamenon of Michael VII

Michael VII was born c. 1050 in Constantinople, the eldest son of Constantine X Doukas and Eudokia Makrembolitissa. He was probably associated with the throne by the end of 1060, together with or shortly before his newly born brother Konstantios Doukas. When Constantine X died on 23 May 1067, Michael VII was already 17 years old and should have been able to rule by himself. He exhibited little interest in politics, however, and his mother Eudokia and uncle John Doukas governed the empire effectively.

On 1 January 1068, Eudokia married the general Romanos IV Diogenes, who now became senior co-emperor alongside Michael VII, Konstantios, and another brother, Andronikos. When Romanos IV was defeated and captured by Alp Arslan of the Seljuk Turks at the Battle of Manzikert in August 1071, Michael VII remained in the background, while the initiative to take power was taken by his uncle John Doukas and his tutor Michael Psellos. Michael VII was proclaimed emperor on c. 1 October 1071, (Note: The date was traditionally given as 24 September 1071 based on Michael Attaliates statement that Michael VII reigned "6 years and 6 months", reckoning from his deposition on 24 March according to the same author.) although Eudokia co-ruled with Michael VII for a month before being dispatched to a monastery. (Note: The joint rule of Eudokia and Michael VII is dated differently by various scholars: Muralt dates it in 24 September – 24 October 1071, Schreiner dates it in 1 October – 1 November 1071, and Polemis dates it in late September – late October 1071.)

Although still advised by Michael Psellos and John Doukas, Michael VII became increasingly reliant on his finance minister Nikephoritzes. The emperor's chief interests, shaped by Psellos, were in academic pursuits, and he allowed Nikephoritzes to increase both taxation and luxury spending without properly financing the army. As an emperor he was incompetent, often surrounded by sycophantic court officials. In dire straits, imperial officials resorted to property confiscations and even expropriated some of the wealth of the church. The underpaid army tended to mutiny, and the Byzantines lost Bari, their last possession in Italy, to the Normans of Robert Guiscard in 1071. Simultaneously, they faced a serious revolt under Georgi Voyteh in the Balkans, where they faced an attempt at the restoration of the Bulgarian state. Although this revolt was suppressed by the general Nikephoros Bryennios, the Byzantine Empire was unable to recover its losses in Asia Minor.

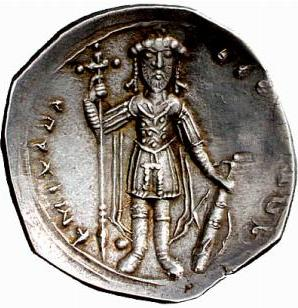
Miliaresion of Michael VII Doukas

After Manzikert, the Byzantine government sent a new army to contain the Seljuk Turks under Isaac Komnenos, a brother of the future emperor Alexios I Komnenos, but this army was defeated and its commander captured in 1073. The problem was made worse by the desertion of the Byzantines' western mercenaries under Roussel de Bailleul who were setting up an independent principality in the region of Galatia and Lycaonia. They became the object of the next military expedition in the area, led by Michael's uncle, caesar John Doukas. This campaign also ended in failure, and John was likewise captured by the enemy. The victorious Roussel now forced John Doukas to stand as pretender to the throne and sacked Chrysopolis, just opposite Constantinople. A new army under Alexios Komnenos (the future emperor), reinforced by Seljuk troops sent by Malik Shah I, finally defeated the mercenaries and captured John Doukas in 1074.

These misfortunes caused widespread dissatisfaction, exacerbated by the devaluation of the currency, which gave the emperor his nickname Parapinakēs. (Note: Speake 2021, p. 511: "His nickname, Parpinakes, derives from the diminution of corn measures by the fraction known as a pinakion".) In 1078 two generals, Nikephoros Bryennios and Nikephoros Botaneiates, simultaneously revolted in the Balkans and Anatolia, respectively. Botaneiates gained the support of the Seljuk Turks, and he reached Constantinople first. Michael VII resigned the throne with hardly a struggle on 24 or 31 March 1078 and retired into the Monastery of Stoudios. (Note: Michael Attaleiates, VI.37: "This was on the eve of the day of the Annunciation [...] They deposed the emperor." The same date is found in the Kleinchroniken II, p. 157.) (Note: Skylitzes Continuatus, (VI, 38.): "On the eve of the Annunciation, [the city] proclaimed Botaneiates emperor. They made [Michael VII] convert to the monastic life... on the same Sunday Lazarus Saturday when the miracle performed on Lazarus is celebrated.") He later became metropolitan of Ephesus and died in Constantinople in c. 1090.

Before his resignation from the throne, Michael VII may have sent an embassy to Song China, following a series of Byzantine embassies to the earlier Tang Empire of China. From the Wenxian Tongkao, written by Chinese historian Ma Duanlin (1245–1322), and the 14th century work the History of Song, it is known that the ruler "Mie-li-yi-ling-kai-sa" (滅力伊靈改撒) of Fu-lin (i.e. Byzantium) sent an embassy to the Song dynasty which arrived on November 1081, during the reign of Emperor Shenzong of Song (r. 1067–1085). The History of Song mentions how the Byzantine diplomat and official named "Ni-si-tu-ling-si-meng-p'an" offered saddled horses, sword-blades, and real pearls as tributary gifts to the Song court.

== Usurpers ==
Various usurpers attempted to overthrow Michael VII or rule parts of the empire. These included:

- Nestor – A former slave of Constantine X, Nestor had been promoted to become the dux of Paradounavon, a region bordering the Danube. Having had much of his property and wealth confiscated by the minister Nikephoritzes, he rebelled in around 1076, placing himself at the head of the garrisons under his command, which were already in a state of mutiny due to an arrears in their pay. The troops were eager to plunder the Bulgarians, and Nestor obtained the assistance of one of the chiefs of the Pechenegs before marching onto Constantinople. The rebels demanded the dismissal of Nikephoritzes, but discovering that he didn't have the numbers to attack the capital, Nestor's troops separated into smaller parties and proceeded to plunder Thrace. Defeated by Alexios Komnenos in 1078, Nestor remained with the Pechenegs, and retreated with them back to Paradunavum.
- Philaretos Brachamios
- John Doukas (the Caesar), Michael's uncle
- Nikephoros Bryennios
- Nikephoros Botaneiates

== Family ==
Michael VII Doukas married Maria of Alania, daughter of King Bagrat IV of Georgia. By her he had at least one son, Constantine Doukas, co-emperor from c. 1075 to 1078 and from 1081 to 1087/8. He died c. 1095.

== Gallery ==
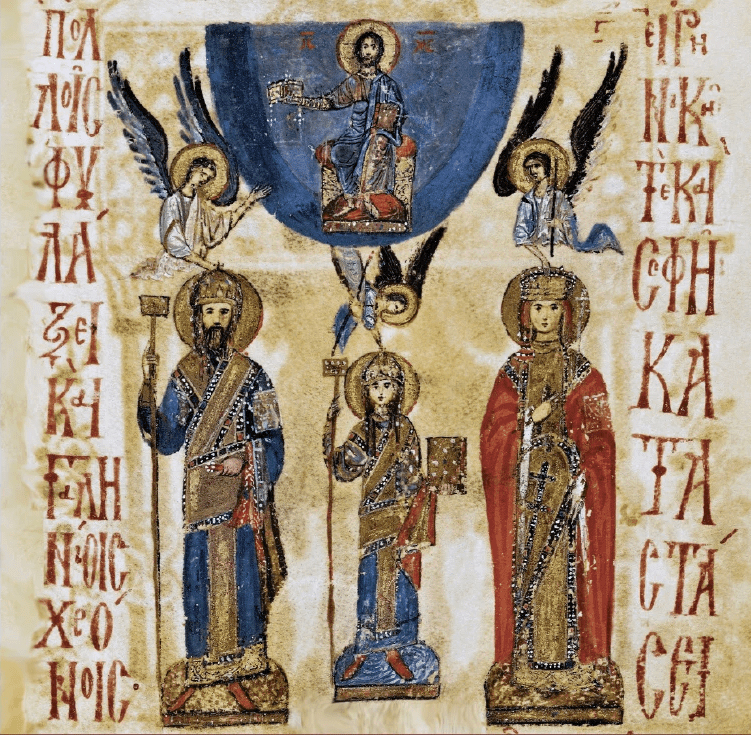
Miniature of Michael VII alongside Constantine X and Eudokia, c. 1060

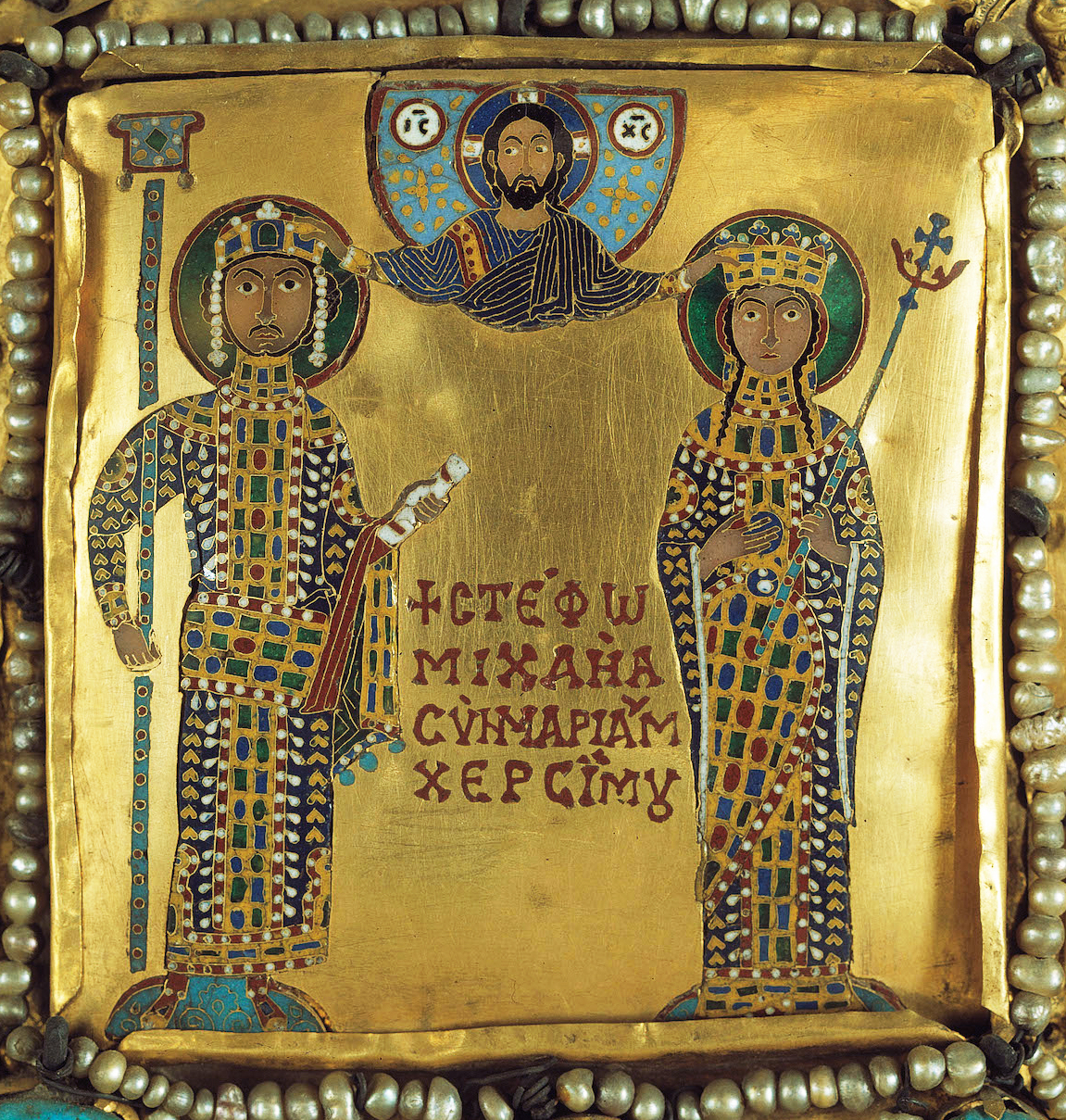
Michael VII and Maria of Alania on the Khakhuli triptych, c. 1072.

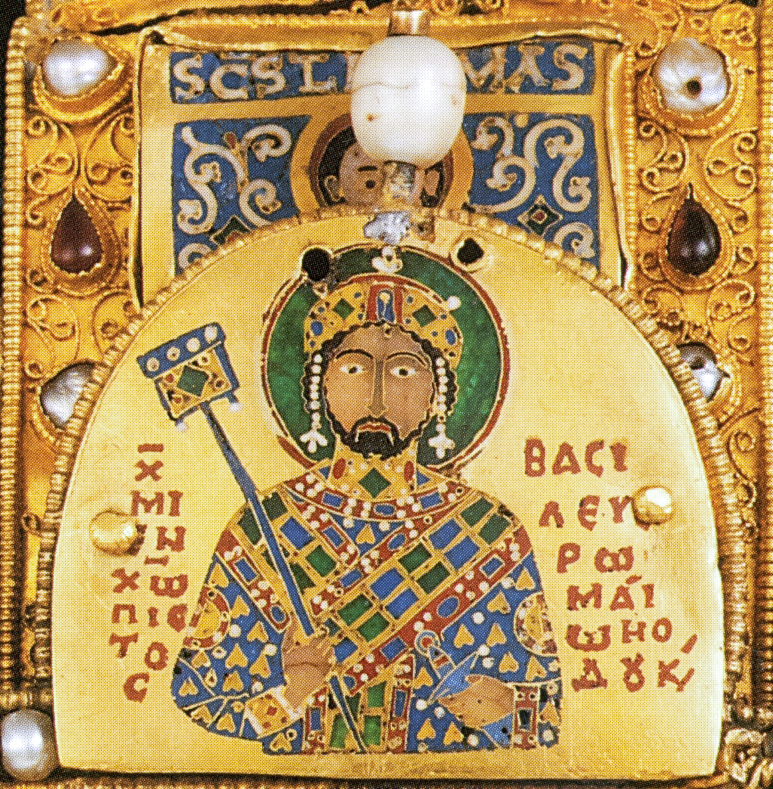
Michael VII Doukas on the back of the Holy Crown of Hungary, c. 1074.

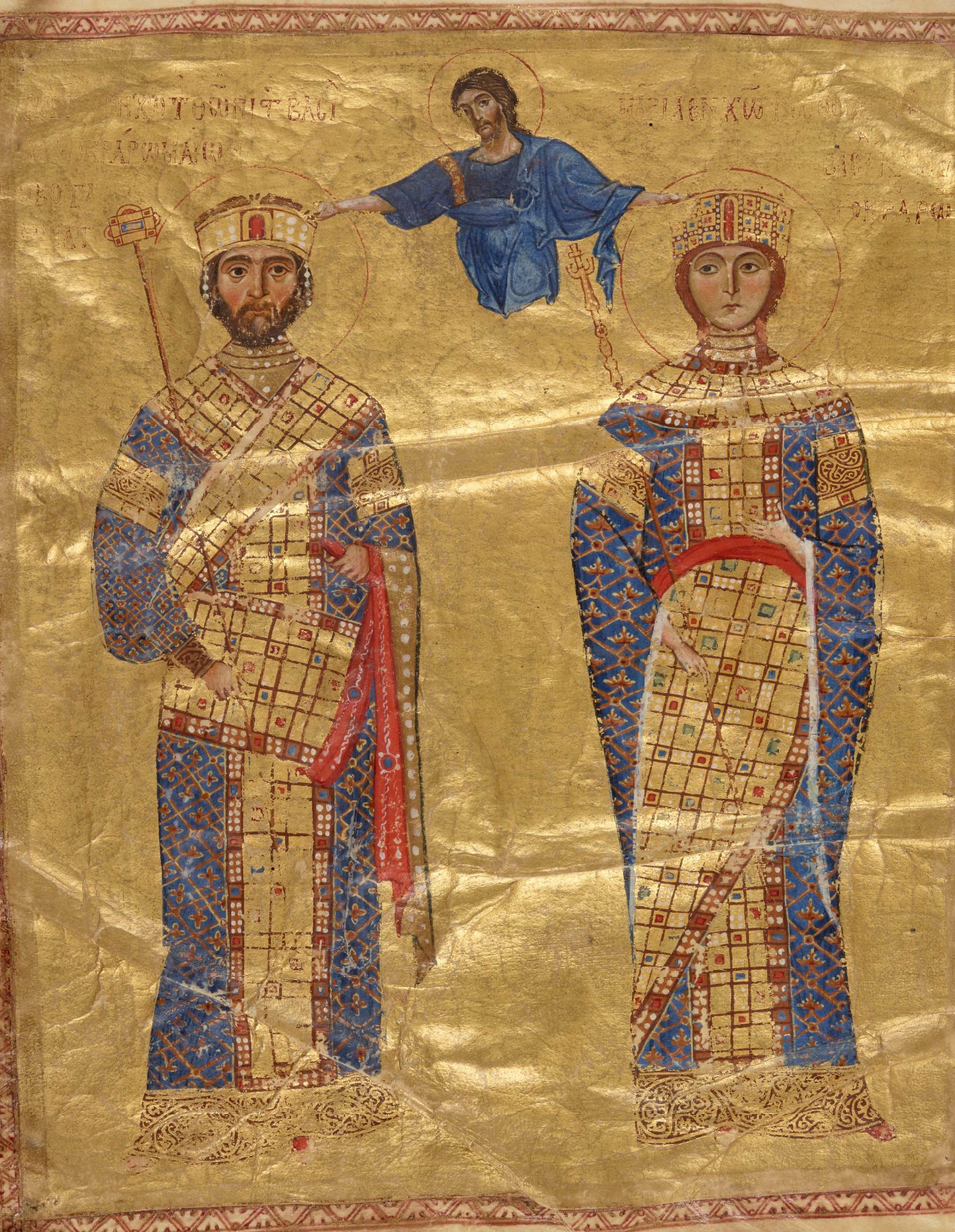
Miniature of Michael VII, later retouched to portray Nikephoros III

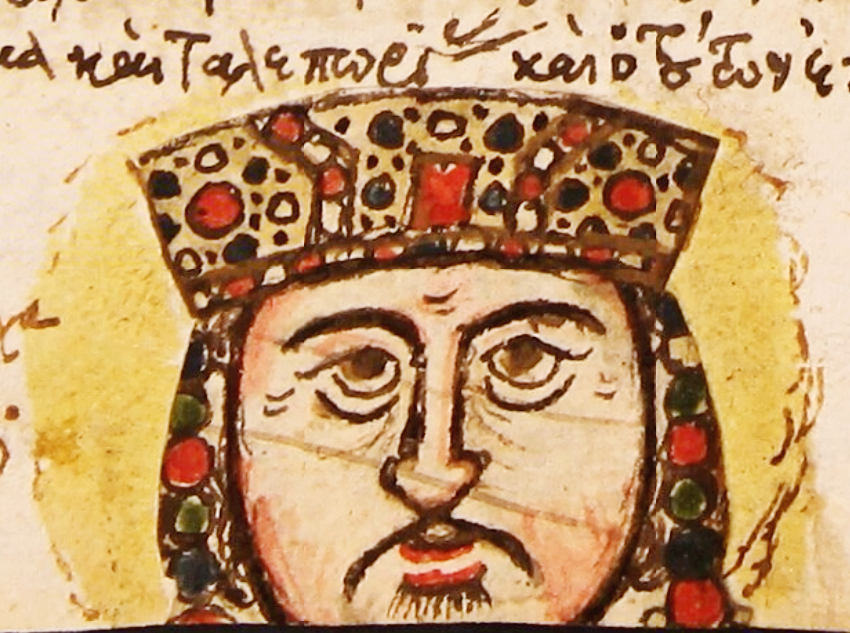
15th-century depiction of Michael VII, from the Mutinensis gr. 122

== Sources ==
=== Primary ===
- Michael Psellos. Chronographia.
- Michael Attaleiates. The Histories.
- Pseudo-John Skylitzes. Scylitzes Continuatus.
- Anna Komnene. The Alexiad.

=== Attribution ===
- This article incorporates text from a publication now in the public domain: Chisholm, Hugh, ed. (1911). "Michael § Michael VII Ducas". Encyclopædia Britannica. Vol. 18 (11th ed.). Cambridge University Press. p. 359.

=== Secondary ===
- Beihammer, Alexander Daniel (2017). Byzantium and the Emergence of Muslim-Turkish Anatolia, Ca. 1040-1130. Taylor & Francis. ISBN 978-1351983860.
- Dumbarton Oaks (1973), Catalogue of the Byzantine Coins in the Dumbarton Oaks Collection and in the Whittemore Collection: Leo III to Nicephorus III, 717–1081
- Finlay, George (1854), History of the Byzantine and Greek Empires from 1057–1453, vol. 2, William Blackwood & Sons
- Gauthier, Paul (1966). "Monodie inédite de Michel Psellos sur le basileus Andronic Doucas". Revue des études byzantines. 24: 153–170. doi:10.3406/rebyz.1966.1367.
- Halsall, Paul (2021-01-20) [1998]. Arkenberg, Jerome S. (ed.). "East Asian History Sourcebook: Chinese Accounts of Rome, Byzantium and the Middle East, c. 91 B.C.E. - 1643 C.E." Internet History Sourcebooks Project. Fordham University.
- Kazhdan, Alexander, ed. (1991), "Michael VII Doukas", Oxford Dictionary of Byzantium, Oxford University Press, pp. 1366–1367, ISBN 978-0-19-504652-6
- McGeer, Eric; Nesbitt, John W. (2020). Byzantium in the time of troubles : the continuation of the Chronicle of John Skylitzes (1057-1079). Leiden. ISBN 978-90-04-41940-7. OCLC 1129395117.
- Norwich, John Julius (1993). Byzantium: The Apogee. Penguin. ISBN 0-14-011448-3.
- Sezgin, Fuat; Ehrig-Eggert, Carl; Mazen, Amawi; Neubauer, E. (1996). نصوص ودراسات من مصادر صينية حول البلدان الاسلامية. Frankfurt am Main: Institut für Geschichte der Arabisch-Islamischen Wissenschaften (Institute for the History of Arabic-Islamic Science at the Johann Wolfgang Goethe University). ISBN 9783829820479.
- Speake, Graham (2021). Encyclopedia of Greece and the Hellenic Tradition. Routledge. ISBN 9781135942069.
- Treadgold, Warren (1997). A History of the Byzantine State and Society. Stanford, California: Stanford University Press. ISBN 0-8047-2630-2.
- Schreiner, Peter (1975). Die byzantinischen Kleinchroniken I [Byzantine small chronicles 1]. Corpus Fontium Historiae Byzantinae. Vienna: ÖAW. ISBN 978-3-7001-0206-9.
- Schreiner, Peter (1977). Die byzantinischen Kleinchroniken II: Historischer Kommentar [Byzantine small chronicles 2: Historical commentary]. CFHB (in German). Vienna: ÖAW. ISBN 978-3-7001-0206-9.

Michael VII Doukas Doukid dynasty Born: c. 1050 Died: c. 1090
Regnal titles
| Preceded by Romanos IV | Byzantine emperor 1 October 1071 – 24/31 March 1078 with Constantine X (1059–1067); Eudokia Makrembolitissa (1067 & 1071) and Romanos IV (1068–1071) as senior emperors with Konstantios Doukas (1060–1078); Andronikos Doukas (1068–1070s); Constantine Doukas (c. 1074–1078) and Leo & Nikephoros Diogenes (c. 1070–1071) as junior co-emperors | Succeeded by Nikephoros III |
