= Battle of Larissa =

1082 battle

- Part of the First Norman invasion of the Balkans
- First Norman invasion of the Balkans
Date	July 1083
Location	Larissa, Thessaly, Byzantine Empire 39°36′N 22°24′E
Result	Byzantine–Seljuk victory

Belligerents
Byzantine Empire; Sultanate of Rum (Note: Faced with immediate threats from the Normans, Alexios avoided a two-front war by diplomatically allying with the Seljuk commander Suleiman ibn Qutalmish, who had seized control of Nicaea and Nicomedia)	Duchy of Apulia and Calabria

Commanders and leaders
Alexios I Komnenos; Nikephoros Melissenos; Basil Kourtikios	Bohemond of Taranto; Count of Brienne

Strength
15,000: 7,000 Seljuk Turks	unknown

The Battle of Larissa was a military engagement between the armies of the Byzantine Empire and the Italo-Norman County of Apulia and Calabria. On 3 November 1082, the Normans besieged the city of Larissa. In July of the following year, Byzantine reinforcements attacked the blockading force, harassing it with mounted archers and spreading discord among its ranks through diplomatic techniques. The demoralized Normans were forced to break off the siege.

== Background ==
The Normans first arrived in southern Italy in 1015 from northern France and served local Lombard lords as mercenaries against the Byzantine Empire. As they were paid with lands, soon they were powerful enough to challenge Papal authority; in 1054, they defeated the Pope at the Battle of Civitate, forcing him to acknowledge their authority. In 1059, the Pope made Robert Guiscard, of the Hauteville family, Duke of Apulia, Calabria, and Sicily. However, most of Apulia and Calabria were in Byzantine hands, and Sicily was in Saracen hands.

By 1071, Robert, together with his brother Roger, had taken over the last Byzantine stronghold in Italy, Bari. By the next year, they conquered all of Sicily, ending the Islamic Emirate of Sicily. In 1073, the Byzantine Emperor Michael VII sent an envoy to Robert offering the hand of his son Constantine to Robert's daughter Helena. Guiscard accepted the offer and sent his daughter to Constantinople. However, in 1078, Michael was overthrown by Nicephorus Botaneiates, an event that destroyed any chances Helena had for the throne. This gave Robert a motive to invade the empire claiming his daughter had been mistreated; however, his intervention was delayed by a revolt in Italy.

Robert conscripted all men of a fighting age into the army, which he refitted. Meanwhile, he sent an ambassador to the Byzantine court with orders to demand proper treatment for Helena and to win over the Domestic of the Schools, Alexios Komnenos. The results of these attempts remain unknown, but the ambassador fell under Alexios's charm and as he was returning to Italy, he heard of Alexios's successful coup against Botaneiates, by which he became emperor.

When the ambassador returned, he urged Robert to make peace, claiming that Alexios wanted nothing but friendship with the Normans. Robert had no intention of peace; he sent his son Bohemond with an advance force towards Greece and Bohemond landed at Aulon, with Robert following shortly after.

On 18 October 1081, the Byzantines under Alexios suffered a devastating defeat at the Battle of Dyrrhachium. Historian Jonathan Harris states that the defeat was "every bit as severe as that at Manzikert." Alexios lost about 5,000 of his men, including most of the Varangians. Norman losses are unknown, but John Haldon claims they too were substantial as both wings broke and fled. Historian Robert Holmes states: "The new knightly tactic of charging with the lance couched—tucked firmly under the arm to unite the impact of man and horse—proved a battle-winner.

George Palaiologos had not been able to re-enter the city after the battle and left with the main force. The defense of the citadel was left to the Venetians, while the city itself was left to the Count of the Tent mobilizing from Arbanon (i.e., ἐξ Ἀρβάνων ὁρμωμένω Κομισκόρτη; the term Κομισκόρτη is short for κόμης της κόρτης meaning "Count of the Tent").

In February 1082, Dyrrhachium fell after a Venetian or Amalfitan citizen opened the gates to the Normans. The Norman army proceeded to take most of northern Greece without facing much resistance. While Guiscard was in Kastoria, messengers arrived from Italy, bearing news that Apulia, Calabria, and Campania were in revolt. He also learned that the Holy Roman Emperor, Henry IV, was at the gates of Rome and besieging Pope Gregory VII, a Norman ally. Alexios had negotiated with Henry and given him 360,000 gold pieces in return for an alliance. Henry responded by invading Italy and attacking the Pope. Guiscard rushed to Italy, leaving Bohemond in command of the army in Greece.

Alexios, desperate for money, ordered the confiscation of all the church's treasure. With this money, Alexios mustered an army near Thessalonica and went to fight Bohemond. However, Bohemond defeated Alexios in two battles: one near Arta and the other near Ioannina. This left Bohemond in control of Macedonia and nearly all of Thessaly.

== Battle ==
On 3 November 1082, Bohemond advanced from his encampment in Trikala to lay siege to the city of Larissa. Next to nothing is known about the course of the siege or the city's fortifications. Larissa's governor Leo Kephalas, an experienced officer, sent a letter to Alexios requesting urgent assistance six months into the siege (April 1083), as the siege had begun to take its toll on the defenders. The Byzantines then resorted to organizing a plot within the Norman army, spearheaded by the officers Peter of Aulps, Renaldus, and William, who were accused of attempting to defect. In the early winter of 1082, Alexios managed to obtain a mercenary force of 7,000 soldiers from the Seljuq Turkish sultan Suleiman ibn Qutulmish. The contingent was led by a general named Kamyres. Alexios continued to raise troops in Constantinople, while in late 1082 the Patriarch of Jerusalem Euthymius was sent to Thessalonica, where he mustered an additional force and attempted to broker a deal with the Normans. In March 1083, Alexios departed from Constantinople at the head of an army which marched towards Larissa. The army advanced through the narrow Tempe Valley, camping at Plabitza on the bank of the Peneius.

The Byzantines avoided a direct engagement with the Normans, passing south-west of Larissa and arriving at Trikala in early April, without encountering any resistance. Byzantine scouts managed to apprehend a local man, who provided them with crucial information about the topography of the areas surrounding Larissa. The poor morale and lack of military experience of the Byzantine troops necessitated the use of guile to defeat the Normans. A day later, the generals Nikephoros Melissenos and Basil Kourtikios approached Larissa from the east while bearing the imperial standard. In the account of John Zonaras Alexios' brother Adrian commands this decoy force wearing imperial garb leading the Normans to believe that they have engaged the main force under the command of the emperor. Following a brief engagement the Byzantines made a feigned retreat, leading the unsuspecting Normans to a place called Lykostomion (Wolf's Mouth), where Alexios awaited with a unit of elite cavalry. Bohemond and the Count of Brienne's cavalry charged towards the imperial standard. When a small force of peltasts (light infantry) and mounted archers began to harass them from another direction, Brienne's cavalry turned their attention towards them. Suffering casualties, the cavalrymen broke off the engagement. Meanwhile, Behemond had established his camp on the river islet of Salabria, eating grapes (pointing out that the engagement probably happened in late July). The following day, the Turkish and "Sarmatian" (probably Pecheneg) mounted archers returned, this time raiding Bohemond's camp. The Normans decided to stand their ground and formed a phalanx. Panic ensued when the Norman flag bearer was killed, prompting their retreat to Trikala.

== Aftermath ==
Discord continued to spread in the Norman army, as its officers demanded two and half years' worth of payment arrears, a sum Bohemond did not possess. The bulk of the Norman army returned to the coast and sailed back to Italy, leaving only a small garrison at Kastoria.

Alexios granted the Venetians a commercial colony in Constantinople, as well as exemption from trading duties in return for their renewed aid. They responded by recapturing Dyrrhachium and Corfu and returning them to the Byzantine Empire. These victories returned the Empire to its previous status quo and marked the beginning of the Komnenian restoration.
