= Adrianos Komnenos =

Byzantine military officer (died 1105)

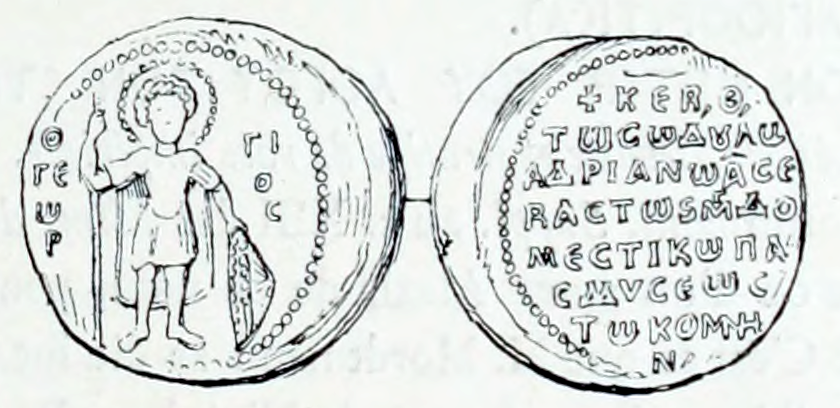
- Seal of Adrianos with Saint George and his titles of protosebastos and grand domestic (megas domestikos) of the West
- Died: 1105
- Spouse: Zoe Doukaina
- Children: Alexios Komnenos; Anne Komnene; Alexia Komnene
- Relatives: Alexios I Komnenos (brother), Isaac Komnenos (brother)
- Military career
- Allegiance: Byzantine Empire
- Rank: Domestic of the Schools
- Conflicts: Byzantine–Norman wars, wars against the Pechenegs

Adrianos Komnenos (Greek: Ἁδριανὸς Κομνηνός) (died 1105) was a Byzantine aristocrat and general, and a younger brother of the Byzantine emperor Alexios I Komnenos (r. 1081–1118).

== Biography ==
Born in c. 1060–1065, Adrianos Komnenos was the fourth and second-to-last son (and seventh overall child) of the domestikos ton scholon John Komnenos, the younger brother of Emperor Isaac I Komnenos (r. 1057–1059) and Anna Dalassene. According to the historian Nikephoros Bryennios, after John's death, Anna entrusted Adrianos and his younger brother Nikephoros to tutors, and gave them an encyclopedic education.

After Alexios's rise to power in 1081, Adrianos was raised to the new dignity of protosebastos, which he shared, for a time, with his brother-in-law Michael Taronites and with the Doge of Venice. According to Zonaras, he was also entrusted with military commands in the campaigns of 1082–1083 against the Normans of Robert Guiscard and Bohemund in Thessaly. Zonaras reports that Alexios gave his brother the imperial regalia, and had him pretend to retreat with his army, so that Alexios himself could strike the pursuing Normans from the rear. However, in the Alexiad, Anna Komnene credits Nikephoros Melissenos with this role, while the Italian chronicler William of Apulia refers to the two persons as one ("the other brother of the Emperor, also known as Melisianus; his name was Adrianos"). Possibly as a reward for his service, in August 1084 Adrianos was given the proceeds of the entire Kassandra peninsula in Chalcidice for life.

In late 1086 or spring 1087, he succeeded Gregory Pakourianos as domestikos ton scholon of the West, and in 1087, he fought in the Battle of Dristra against the Pechenegs, commanding the Frankish mercenary contingent in the Byzantine centre. The battle ended in a disastrous defeat, and Adrianos barely escaped being captured. Adrianos is mentioned in the Alexiad as having participated in the 1091 campaign against the Pechenegs (along with the protostrator Michael Doukas, he supervised the construction of a bridge over the Evros river), but is not specifically recorded in the final Battle of Levounion.

Shortly after that, at Philippopolis, Adrianos had a major falling-out with his elder brother, the sebastokrator Isaac: the sebastokrator held Adrianos responsible for the accusations of conspiring against the emperor that were raised against his son John, governor of Dyrrhachium. In June 1094, at Serres, Adrianos presided over the court that tried Nikephoros Diogenes, the son of former Emperor Romanos IV (r. 1068–1071), who had tried to assassinate Alexios. Adrianos failed to overcome the obstinacy of Diogenes, who refused to reveal his co-conspirators. In the same year, he is recorded as having participated in the Council of Blachernae that condemned Leo of Chalcedon.

His date of death is disputed: the commonly accepted date stems from a manuscript which records him retiring to a monastery under the monastic name John, and dying on 19 April 1105. Basile Skoulatos, however, doubts this information, since Adrianos' name is absent from the dead listed in the Kecharitomene typikon (written c. 1118), but is present in the Pantokrator typikon of 1136. Hence, Skoulatos has placed Adrianos' death some time between 1118 and 1136.

== Family ==
Adrianos married after October 1081 the porphyrogennete princess Zoe Doukaina (1062 - c. 1136), the third daughter of Emperor Constantine X Doukas (r. 1059–1067) and Eudokia Makrembolitissa (born c. 1062). A number of scholars, including Paul Magdalino, Jean-Claude Cheynet, and Konstantinos Varzos, identify Adrianos and Zoe with a John Komnenos and Anna "of the Doukai" (the latter being Zoe's supposed monastic name) who are mentioned in tomb inscriptions in the Pammakaristos Church in Constantinople as the church's founders, along with their descendants. Adrianos and Zoe had at least three children:

- Alexios Komnenos, born around 1085, his life is obscure. He married and had at least one daughter, Anna Komnenodoukaina, who married the sebastos Alexios Palaiologos, third son of George Palaiologos. Through their oldest son, also named George Palaiologos, they were the maternal ancestors of Michael VIII Palaiologos, who founded the Palaiologos dynasty. Another daughter is given to him, Irene Komnene, who married the megas doux Alexios Palaiologos, son of Michael Palaiologos, by whom she had Andronikos Komnenos Palaiologos.
- Firstborn daughter (name unknown), otherwise unknown. Varzos suggests the name Anna for her.
- Daughter (name unknown), possibly married Grimaldo II, the lord of Monoecum in c. 1102, but died with her husband shortly after. Varzos suggests the name Alexia for her.

== Sources ==
- Cheynet, Jean-Claude; Vannier, Jean-François (1986). Études Prosopographiques [Prosopographical Studies] (in French). Paris: Publications de la Sorbonne. ISBN 978-2-85944-110-4.
- Gautier, Paul (1971). "Le synode des Blachernes (fin 1094). Étude prosopographique" [The Synod of Blachernae (end of 1094). A Prosopographical Study.]. Revue des études byzantines (in French). 29: 213–284. doi:10.3406/rebyz.1971.1445.
- Kazhdan, Alexander (1991). "Palaiologos". In Kazhdan, Alexander (ed.). The Oxford Dictionary of Byzantium. Oxford and New York: Oxford University Press. pp. 1557–1560. ISBN 0-19-504652-8.
- Polemis, Demetrios I. (1968). The Doukai: A Contribution to Byzantine Prosopography. London: The Athlone Press.
- Skoulatos, Basile (1980). Les personnages byzantins de l'Alexiade: Analyse prosopographique et synthèse [The Byzantine Personalities of the Alexiad: Prosopographical Analysis and Synthesis] (in French). Louvain-la-Neuve and Louvain: Bureau du Recueil Collège Érasme and Éditions Nauwelaerts.
- Varzos, Konstantinos (1984). Η Γενεαλογία των Κομνηνών [The Genealogy of the Komnenoi] (PDF) (in Greek). Vol. A1. Thessaloniki: Centre for Byzantine Studies, University of Thessaloniki.
