= Alexios Palaiologos =

Alexios Palaiologos may refer to:

- younger brother of Andronikos Doukas Palaiologos (c. 1083/85 – c. 1115/18), Byzantine aristocrat and governor of Thessalonica
- Alexios Palaiologos (despot) (died 1203), grandson of Andronikos Doukas Palaiologos

== See also ==
- Palaiologos
