= Katakalon =

Byzantine noble family

Katakalon (Greek: Κατακαλών), rarely Katakalos (Κατακαλός), was the name of a Byzantine noble family of the 10th–12th centuries.

The first attested member of the family is Leo Katakalon, who served as Domestic of the Schools ca. 900. In the 11th century, due to their intermarriage with other aristocratic families, they often bore double surnames, while a branch of the family apparently assumed the name Maurokatakalon or Mavrokatakalon (Μαυροκατακαλών, "Black Katakalon"). Most of the family members are known as military officers, such as Demetrios Katakalon, katepano of Paradounavon, or the general and military author Katakalon Kekaumenos. The family became particularly prominent under the Komnenian emperors; Constantine Euphorbenos Katakalon was one of the most important generals of Alexios I Komnenos, and his son Nikephoros Katakalon wedded the Emperor's daughter Maria. Their sons likewise occupied high positions of authority. Likewise, Nicholas Maurokatakalon and his sons Marianos and Gregory were prominent military commanders at the time of Alexios I.

After the 12th century, the family descended into obscurity.

== Sources ==
- Kazhdan, Alexander (1991). "Katakalon". In Kazhdan, Alexander (ed.). The Oxford Dictionary of Byzantium. Oxford and New York: Oxford University Press. p. 1113. ISBN 0-19-504652-8.
