= Nicholas Maurokatakalon =

Nicholas Maurokatakalon (Greek: Νικόλαος Μαυροκατακαλών; fl. 1087–1096) was a Byzantine aristocrat and military commander in the reign of Alexios I Komnenos.

Of noble origin, nothing is known of his early life. He first appears in 1087, during the Pecheneg invasion of the Byzantine Empire's Balkan provinces, when he defeated the invaders in a fierce battle at Koule, for which he and his co-commander Bempetziotes received high honours from Emperor Alexios I. When Alexios campaigned in person against the Pechenegs in the same summer, Maurokatakalon joined him. When Alexios left the army for Constantinople in winter 1090, Maurokatakalon and Basil Kourtikios were left behind as co-commanders, and tasked with refortifying the towns of the Balkans as well as preparing next year' campaign. In 1095, Maurokatakalon participated in Alexios' campaign against the Cumans, but in August of the next year, he appears as imperial admiral (doux tou stolou) in the Adriatic Sea, sent to receive the first ships of the First Crusade. He is last mentioned in December 1096.

His son, Marianos Maurokatakalon, married a sister of Nikephoros Bryennios the Younger, and likewise served as a military commander on land and at sea.

== Bibliography ==
- Meško, Marek (2023). Alexios I Komnenos in the Balkans, 1081–1095. Palgrave Macmillan. ISBN 9783031262968.
- Skoulatos, Basile (1980). Les personnages byzantins de l'Alexiade: Analyse prosopographique et synthèse [The Byzantine Personalities of the Alexiad: Prosopographical Analysis and Synthesis] (in French). Louvain-la-Neuve and Louvain: Bureau du Recueil Collège Érasme and Éditions Nauwelaerts. OCLC 8468871.
