= Constantine Dalassenos =

Constantine Dalassenos may refer to:

- Constantine Dalassenos (duke of Antioch) (fl. 998–1042), Byzantine general and aristocrat
- Constantine Dalassenos (thalassokrator) (fl. 1086–1093), Byzantine admiral
