= John Komnenos =

John Komnenos or Comnenus may refer to:

- John Komnenos (Domestic of the Schools) (c. 1015 – 1067), Byzantine general and progenitor of the Komnenian dynasty
- John Komnenos (parakoimomenos) (c. 1070 – after 1118), Byzantine nobleman and official
- John II Komnenos (1087–1143), Byzantine emperor from 1118 to 1143
- John Komnenos (governor of Dyrrhachium) (fl. 1092–1106), Byzantine governor of Dyrrhachium
- John Tzelepes Komnenos, (fl. 1130–1140), Byzantine nobleman who defected to the Seljuk Turks
- John Komnenos Vatatzes (fl. 1132–1182), Byzantine general
- John Doukas Komnenos (1128–1176), military governor of Cyprus
- John Komnenos (son of Andronikos I) (1159–1185), second son and co-emperor of Andronikos I
- John Komnenos the Fat, Byzantine nobleman who attempted a usurpation in 1200
- John Komnenos Asen (fl. 1346–1363), ruler of the Principality of Valona
