= Basil Kourtikios =

Basil Kourtikes or Kourtikios (Greek: Βασίλειος Κουρτίκης/Κουρτίκιος; fl. 1077–c. 1105) was a Byzantine aristocrat and military commander in the reign of Alexios I Komnenos.

== Life ==
=== Early life and career ===
Not much is known about Kourtikios' early life. His family, the Kourtikioi, were of Armenian origin, being occasionally attested in the Byzantine since the late 9th century. Basil himself hailed from Adrianople, and was a cousin of George Palaiologos.

Kourtikios is first mentioned in 1077, as taking part in the uprising of Nikephoros Bryennios the Elder, where he distinguished himself in the capture of Trajanopolis by the rebel forces. Following Bryennios' defeat by imperial troops under Alexios Komnenos (emperor in 1081–1118) at the Battle of Kalavrye, Kourtikios made use of the amnesty declared by Emperor Nikephoros III Botaneiates (r. 1078–1081), and entered imperial service. He soon fought, under Alexios Komnenos, against another rebel general, Nikephoros Basilakes, capturing Basilakes' brother in the battle that ended the uprising.

In 1080, Kourtikios participated in a campaign against the rebel general Nikephoros Melissenos. Along with his cousin, George Palaiologos, he was placed under the command of the incompetent court eunuch John, who refused to follow their advice. Soon, however, John became frightened of the constant attacks of the Turks, and left the army in Palaiologos' hands. Although the latter managed to save the army from disaster, John complained about the two at court, and on his return to Constantinople they were blamed for the defeat.

=== Under Alexios I Komnenos ===
In 1083, Kourtikios participated in Alexios' campaign against the Italo-Normans in Thessaly. In spring 1087, he tried to oppose the advance of the Pechenegs in Thrace, and during the summer campaign of the same year against the Pechenegs, he was one of six warriors chosen as his personal bodyguards by Alexios. Kourtikios likely remained at Alexios' side during the campaigns of the next two years against the Pechenegs. When Alexios left the army for Constantinople in winter 1090, Kourtikios and Nicholas Maurokatakalon were left behind as co-commanders, and tasked with refortifying the towns of the Balkans as well as preparing next year' campaign.

Kourtikios was sent as ambassador to the Seljuk ruler, Sultan Malik-Shah I (r. 1071–1092) to pursue the project of a marriage alliance; but he had not yet reached the Seljuk court when he received news of the Sultan's death, and had to turn back. Despite the high esteem in which he was held, and the apparent confidence Alexios placed in him, Kourtikios participated in the abortive conspiracy of the Anemas brothers, which resulted in his being arrested, publicly humiliated, and imprisoned; his properties were confiscated. Nothing further is known of him.

== Bibliography ==
- Kazhdan, Alexander, ed. (1991). The Oxford Dictionary of Byzantium. Oxford and New York: Oxford University Press. ISBN 0-19-504652-8.
- Skoulatos, Basile (1980). Les personnages byzantins de l'Alexiade: Analyse prosopographique et synthèse [The Byzantine Personalities of the Alexiad: Prosopographical Analysis and Synthesis] (in French). Louvain-la-Neuve and Louvain: Bureau du Recueil Collège Érasme and Éditions Nauwelaerts. OCLC 8468871.
