= Nikephoros Melissenos =

- Kaisar
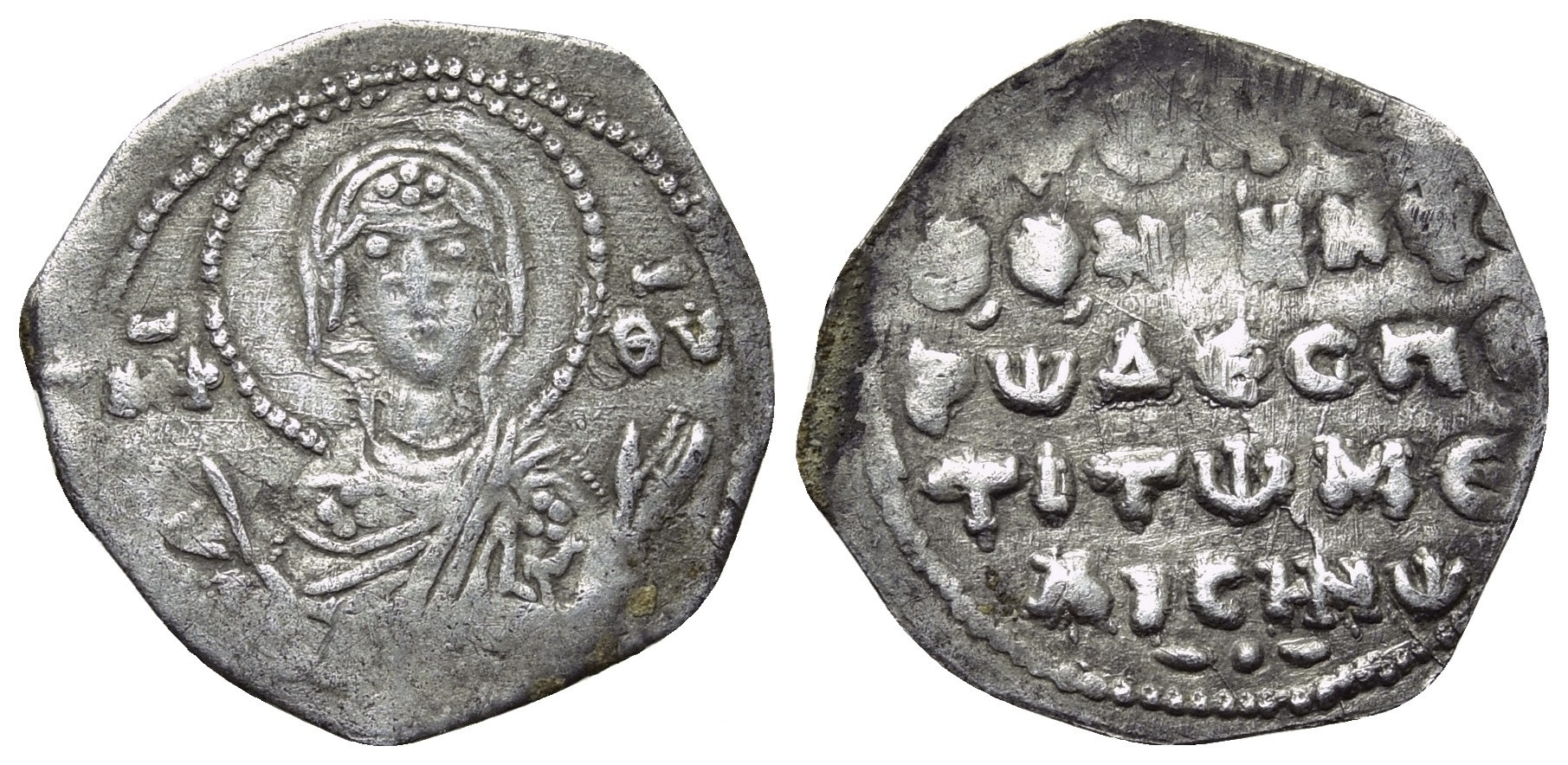
- 2/3 Miliaresion struck by Melissenos during his revolt

Caesar of the Byzantine empire
- Reign: 8 April 1081 – 17 November 1104
- Emperor: Alexios I Komnenos

Usuper of the Byzantine empire
- Reign: Autumn 1080 – 4 April 1081
- Predecessor: Nikephoros III Botaneiates
- Successor: Alexios I Komnenos
Pre-imperial positions
Proedros
Strategos of Anatolikon c. 1077-8
Monarch	Michael VII Doukas
Preceded by	Nikephoros Botaneiates
Magistros
Doux of Triaditza c. 1067
Monarch	Constantine X Doukas
- Born: c. 1045; Dorylaeum, Byzantine Empire
- Died: 17 November 1104 (aged 58–59) near Thessalonica, Byzantine Empire
- Wife: Eudokia Komnene
- Issue: John Komnenos
- Dynasty: Melissenos
- Father: Bourtzes
- Mother: Melissene

Nikephoros Melissenos (Greek: Νικηφόρος Μελισσηνός, c. 1045 – 17 November 1104), Latinized as Nicephorus Melissenus, was a Byzantine general and aristocrat. Of distinguished lineage, he served as a governor and general in the Balkans and Asia Minor in the 1060s. In the turbulent period after the Battle of Manzikert in 1071, when several generals tried to seize the throne for themselves, Melissenos remained loyal to Michael VII Doukas and was exiled by his successor Nikephoros III Botaneiates. In 1080–1081, with Turkish aid, he seized control of what remained of Byzantine Asia Minor and proclaimed himself emperor against Botaneiates. After the revolt of his brother-in-law Alexios I Komnenos, however, which succeeded in taking Constantinople, he submitted to him, accepting the rank of Caesar and the governance of Thessalonica. He remained loyal to Alexios thereafter, participating in most Byzantine campaigns of the period 1081–1095 in the Balkans at the emperor's side. He died on 17 November 1104.

== Biography ==
=== Origins and early career ===
Nikephoros Melissenos was probably born c. 1045 at Dorylaeum, where his family had extensive estates. Through both his father and his mother, he was of aristocratic descent: his father belonged to the Bourtzes line, while his mother to the illustrious Melissenos family, which dated back to the 8th century and had produced several distinguished generals.

Sometime before 1067, Nikephoros married Eudokia Komnene. Born c. 1052, she was the second daughter of the Domestic of the Schools John Komnenos and Anna Dalassene and sister of the future Byzantine emperor Alexios I Komnenos (r. 1081–1118). They had at least one known son, the parakoimomenos John Komnenos.

By 1067, Melissenos held the rank of magistros and the post of military governor (doux) in Triaditza (modern Sofia). In 1070, he joined the field army commanded by his eldest brother-in-law, Manuel Komnenos, in a campaign against the Seljuk Turks. The campaign ended in defeat near Sebasteia (modern Sivas), and Melissenos along with Manuel Komnenos were captured by a Turkish chieftain whom the Byzantines called Chrysoskoulos. Manuel, however, quickly persuaded the Turk to enter into Byzantine service, and their captivity ended.

Melissenos remained loyal to Michael VII Doukas (r. 1071–1078) during the rebellion of the strategos of the Anatolic Theme, Nikephoros Botaneiates (Nikephoros III), which began in October 1077. Michael VII rewarded him by appointing him to Botaneiates's post, but after Botaneiates's victory and entry into Constantinople in April 1078, Melissenos was exiled to the island of Kos.

=== Rebellion ===
In autumn 1080, Melissenos left Kos and returned to Asia Minor. There, he succeeded in gaining the support of the local population, and in recruiting many Turkish tribesmen as mercenaries to his army. One by one, the cities of western and central Asia Minor opened up their gates to him, and Turkish garrisons were installed in them. Botaneiates tried to send Alexios Komnenos, who had recently suppressed the revolts of Nikephoros Bryennios and Nikephoros Basilakes, against him, but he refused. In February 1081, Melissenos's troops took Nicaea, where he was acclaimed as emperor. A loyalist army under the eunuch protovestiarios John, George Palaiologos and Kourtikes was sent against him, but was defeated almost without battle, and withdrew to the capital.

In March 1081, Melissenos was encamped with his army at Damalis, on the Asian shore across the Bosporus from Constantinople. There, he received news of the revolt of the Komnenoi against Botaneiates and the proclamation of Alexios Komnenos as emperor. He sent letters to the Komnenoi, suggesting a division of authority over the imperial territory, with the Balkans remaining under Komnenian control and himself keeping Asia Minor, although he also emphasized that the Byzantine Empire should remain formally united. In reply, the Komnenoi offered to recognize him as Caesar – the second highest dignity after the imperial title itself – and to give him the governance of Thessalonica – the Empire's second-most important city – if he would submit to them. Melissenos initially refused to accept this offer, but as the Komnenoi were on the verge of taking Constantinople and might refuse to make similar concessions later, he eventually agreed.

At the same time, Nikephoros Botaneiates tried to forestall the capital's fall to the Komnenoi by sending for Melissenos and asking him to enter the city and assume imperial authority. His envoys, however, were obstructed by George Palaiologos and never reached Melissenos. Thus Constantinople fell to the Komnenian forces, and on 8 April 1081, Melissenos too entered the imperial capital. True to his word, Alexios I raised him to Caesar and gave him authority over Thessalonica, as well as allotting the city's revenues to his income. At the same time, however, Alexios raised his brother Isaac Komnenos to the newly created dignity of sebastokrator, which he placed above that of Caesar, bypassing Melissenos.

This act of submission, unique among the various rebels of the time, may throw some light on Melissenos's motivation for his uprising, according to the historian Jean-Claude Cheynet. Cheynet believes that Melissenos was probably more concerned with safeguarding his Asian estates from the depredations of the Turks rather than claiming the throne, and when Alexios granted him Thessalonica and equivalent estates around it – some of which Melissenos later distributed to his clients, like the Bourtzes family – he readily gave up the contest for the Byzantine throne.

Despite the end of Melissenos's revolt, it left a profound and detrimental legacy for Byzantium: although Melissenos himself submitted to Alexios Komnenos, the towns he had occupied and garrisoned with Turkish soldiers in Ionia, Phrygia, Galatia, and Bithynia remained in their hands. Thus, by becoming involved in the Byzantine civil wars as mercenaries and allies – especially through their use by Botaneiates and Melissenos during their respective revolts to hold down various cities for them – the Turks completed their relatively peaceful take-over of central and western Asia Minor.

=== Service under Alexios Komnenos ===
Melissenos continued to serve Alexios I faithfully throughout the rest of his life. In autumn 1081, he marched alongside Alexios in his campaign against the Italo-Normans of Robert Guiscard. In the Battle of Dyrrhachium, which ended in a crushing Byzantine defeat, he commanded the Byzantine army's right wing.

In the 1083 campaign in Thessaly against the Normans, who, under Guiscard's son Bohemond were besieging Larissa, Melissenos was used by Alexios as the centerpiece to a ruse de guerre. The emperor gave him the imperial insignia and a detachment of the army, which Bohemond proceeded to attack in the belief that this was the main Byzantine force, since the emperor was present with it. While the Normans pursued Melissenos's men, Alexios with the main army took and looted the Norman camp, forcing Bohemond to lift the siege and withdraw.

Melissenos fought alongside Alexios in the Battle of Dristra in late August 1087 against the Pechenegs, commanding the Byzantine left wing. The battle ended in a heavy Byzantine defeat, and Melissenos was taken captive along with many other Byzantines, to be ransomed by the emperor after some time. In spring 1091, Melissenos was sent to Ainos to recruit soldiers from among the Bulgarians and Vlachs. Occupied with this task, he did not join the imperial army in time for the crushing Byzantine victory over the Pechenegs at the Battle of Levounion on 29 April, arriving the next day.

Later in the same year, he participated in the family council of Philippopolis which examined the accusations of conspiracy raised against John Komnenos, the doux of Dyrrhachium by the Archbishop of Ochrid Theophylact. The council degenerated into a heated family quarrel, where John's father, the sebastokrator Isaac, accused Melissenos and Adrian Komnenos of slandering his son, but in the end Alexios dismissed the charges.

In the 1095 campaign against the Cumans, Melissenos, along with George Palaiologos and John Taronites were left in charge of defending the region of Berrhoe (modern Stara Zagora) against Cuman attacks. This is the last mention of Melissenos in Anna Komnene's Alexiad, and he apparently retired to his estates around Thessalonica. He died on 17 November 1104. The date of his wife's death is unknown, but was before 1136.

== Sources ==
- Angold, Michael (1997). The Byzantine Empire, 1025–1204: A Political History (Second ed.). London and New York: Longman. ISBN 0-582-29468-1.
- Cheynet, Jean-Claude (1996). Pouvoir et Contestations à Byzance (963–1210) (in French). Paris: Publications de la Sorbonne. ISBN 978-2-85944-168-5.
- Kazhdan, Alexander, ed. (1991). The Oxford Dictionary of Byzantium. Oxford and New York: Oxford University Press. ISBN 0-19-504652-8.
- Nikolia, Dimitra (17 October 2003). "Nikephoros Melissenos". Encyclopaedia of the Hellenic World, Asia Minor. Athens: Foundation of the Hellenic World.
- Skoulatos, Basile (1980). Les personnages byzantins de l'Alexiade: Analyse prosopographique et synthèse [The Byzantine Personalities of the Alexiad: Prosopographical Analysis and Synthesis] (in French). Louvain-la-Neuve and Louvain: Bureau du Recueil Collège Érasme and Éditions Nauwelaerts.
- Treadgold, Warren (1997). A History of the Byzantine State and Society. Stanford, California: Stanford University Press. ISBN 0-8047-2630-2.
- Varzos, Konstantinos (1984). Η Γενεαλογία των Κομνηνών [The Genealogy of the Komnenoi] (PDF) (in Greek). Vol. A1. Thessaloniki: Centre for Byzantine Studies, University of Thessaloniki.
- Vryonis, Speros (1971). The Decline of Medieval Hellenism in Asia Minor and the Process of Islamization from the Eleventh through the Fifteenth Century. Berkeley and Los Angeles: University of California Press. ISBN 0-520-01597-5.
