= George Palaiologos =

Late 11th/early 12th century Byzantine general

- Γεώργιος Παλαιολόγος
- Spouse: Anna Doukaina
- Children: Nikephoros, Andronikos, Michael, Alexios
- Relatives: Nikephoros Palaiologos (father), Alexios I Komnenos (brother-in-law)
- Military career
- Allegiance: Byzantine Empire
- Service years: c. 1078–c. 1097
- Rank: sebastos
- Conflicts: Battle of Dyrrhachium, Battle of Dristra, Battle of Levounion, First Crusade

George Palaiologos or Palaeologus (Greek: Γεώργιος Παλαιολόγος; fl. 1078–1110) was a Byzantine aristocrat and general. One of the earliest known members of the Palaiologos dynasty, he was a capable military commander who played a critical role in helping his brother-in-law Alexios I Komnenos seize the throne in 1081. In subsequent year he played an important role in Alexios' campaigns, especially the Battle of Dyrrhachium against the Italo-Normans or the Battle of Levounion against the Pechenegs, and was a major source used by Alexios' daughter Anna Komnene in her biography of her father, the Alexiad.

== Life ==
=== Early life and career ===
George Palaiologos was the son of Nikephoros Palaiologos, the first known member of the Palaiologos family, a prominent noble house of the later Byzantine Empire that provided its final ruling dynasty. George Palaiologos was also linked to the Kourtikes family, as the general Basil Kourtikes was his cousin. Sometime before 1081, he married Anna Doukaina, the sister of Irene Doukaina, the wife of Alexios I Komnenos (r. 1081–1118), then a high-ranking military commander; this made Palaiologos the brother-in-law to the future emperor. Very little is known about Anna herself; she was likely born around 1068.

George Palaiologos is first mentioned under the year 1078, in the history of Nikephoros Bryennios the Younger, alongside his father, who was serving as the governor of the Theme of Mesopotamia at the time; the two supported the rise to the throne of Emperor Nikephoros III Botaneiates (r. 1078–1081) against Michael VII Doukas (r. 1071–1078), although the elder Palaiologos had previously been a Doukas loyalist. In 1080, Palaiologos participated in a campaign against the rebel general Nikephoros Melissenos in Asia Minor. Along with Basil Kourtikes, he was placed under the command of the incompetent court eunuch John, who refused to follow Palaiologos' advice. Soon, however, John became frightened of the constant attacks of the Turks allied with Melissenos, and left the army in Palaiologos' hands. Although Palaiologos saved the army from disaster and managed to retreat in good order, John complained about him at court, and on his return to Constantinople Palaiologos was prohibited from entering the Great Palace.

=== Role in the Komnenian coup ===
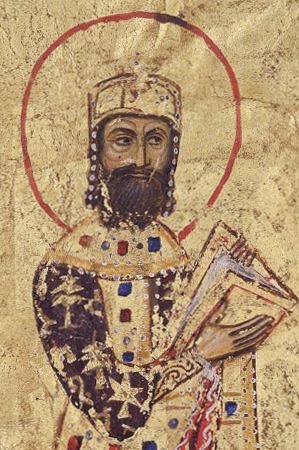
Portrait of Alexios I Komnenos as emperor, from a 12th-century Greek manuscript

The rule of Botaneiates was to be of short duration. The elderly emperor was unable to stop the Turkish advance in Asia Minor, where they seized Nicaea and threatened Constantinople itself; the treasury was empty, despite the extensive debasement of the imperial coinage, so that the payment of salaries had to be suspended; and ambitious generals like Melissenos rose in revolt in the provinces. When Botaneiates began looking for one of his relatives to succeed him, the Doukai and the Komnenoi drew together in common opposition. Empress Maria of Alania hoped to ensure the succession for her son by Michael VII, Constantine Doukas, while the Komnenoi claimed the throne by virtue of their kinship with Isaac I Komnenos (r. 1057–1059). Lacking a suitable male champion of their own, the Doukai, led by the elderly Caesar John Doukas, were forced to rely on the talented Alexios Komnenos instead. Maria of Alania even adopted Alexios to bind him closer to the Doukas cause.

Although related to the Komnenoi by marriage, Palaiologos only joined their plot to usurp the throne reluctantly, and at the last moment; the historian Basile Skoulatos suggests that he rather preferred the Caesar John Doukas to seize the throne instead. The Komnenoi met Palaiologos as they were departing Constantinople to lead the revolt at Kosmidion, on the night of 14 February 1081; Palaiologos had taken the precaution of bringing with him his fortune from the Blachernae Monastery where he had deposited it. According to the sources, it was the pleading of his mother-in-law, Maria of Bulgaria, which convinced him to cast his lot with the Komnenoi, joining their forces at Tzouroulos. At the family council at Skiza, Palaiologos supported the candidature of Alexios for the throne, against Alexios' elder brother, Isaac Komnenos.

When the Komnenian army marched on Constantinople, Palaiologos was put in charge of negotiating with the German mercenary commander Gilpract, who commanded the garrison at the Gate of Charisios. Palaiologos persuaded Gilpract to defect, allowing the Komnenian forces unopposed entry to the capital on 1 April. Immediately after, Palaiologos boarded a boat and secured the allegiance of the Imperial fleet for Alexios. This proved crucial, as Botaneiates attempted at the last minute to thwart the Komnenian coup by using the fleet to ferry across the troops of Melissenos, who had been encamped at the Asian shore of the Bosporus at Damalis.

After Alexios was crowned emperor by Patriarch Cosmas I of Constantinople, the Komnenoi and some of their partisans, now sure of their victory, contemplated sidelining the Doukas family altogether and having Alexios discard Irene Doukaina and possibly marry Maria of Alania instead. When he heard of these plans, Palaiologos angrily protested that he had only joined them in support of Irene's interests. Palaiologos' control of the fleet was vital to the newly established Komnenian regime, as only the fleet prevented Melissenos from crossing the strait; and Palaiologos had prudently had the sailors of the fleet acclaim jointly Alexios and Irene. In the event, along with the Caesar John Doukas, Palaiologos successfully pressured Patriarch Cosmas to not resign his office in favour of a Komnenos-backed candidate before he had crowned Irene as empress, thereby sealing the alliance between the Doukai and the Komnenoi.

Palaiologos' father had remained loyal to Botaneiates, and the meeting of father and son in Constantinople after the coup is described by Skoulatos as one of the "most passionate" scenes of the Alexiad, the great historical biography written by Alexios Komnenos' daughter Anna Komnene.

=== Military career under Alexios ===
Soon after the Komnenian coup, Palaiologos was tasked by Alexios with defending the city of Dyrrhachium against an imminent attack by the Italo-Normans of Robert Guiscard. Palaiologos arrived in the city to find its previous governor gone, but hastened to organize its defence before the Normans landed on 17 June. He led the city's resistance in the ensuing siege, despite being wounded in a sally in July, in support of a Venetian attack on the Normans. On 15 October, as Alexios arrived at Dyrrhachium at the head of a relief army, Palaiologos left the city to join him. In the ensuing war council, Palaiologos opposed a pitched battle with the Normans, but was overruled; and in the Battle of Dyrrhachium on 18 October the Byzantines were heavily defeated. His father was killed, and the city, left without hope of rescue, surrendered soon after.

In October or November 1083, Palaiologos led the Byzantine army that recaptured Kastoria from the Normans. In 1087, he participated in Alexios' campaign against the Pechenegs, who had begun raiding into Byzantine territory in Thrace. The Pechenegs were a Turkic nomadic group from the Pontic Steppe that had been displaced by other Turkic groups and in the mid-1040s had crossed the Danube river into Byzantine territory. Unable to evict them, the Byzantines were forced to accept their settlement as a de facto independent people in what is now northern Bulgaria. Palaiologos advised the emperor to pursue the Pechenegs into their home territories south of the Danube, and later to seek the protection of the walls of Great Preslav. Alexios however listened to other advice, and in the ensuing Battle of Dristra in August 1087, the Byzantines suffered another heavy defeat; Palaiologos himself was nearly captured in the melee. In February 1091, he led a force out from Constantinople to reinforce Alexios, who was fighting the Pechenegs, only to encounter the emperor returning victorious to the capital. Two months later, on 29 April, Palaiologos commanded the Byzantine right wing at the Battle of Levounion, which ended the Pecheneg threat for good.

In 1094 Palaiologos, with the rank of sebastos, took part in the Council of Blachernae, a church council convened by Alexios in the Palace of Blachernae in Constantinople. In early 1095, he was placed in charge of the defence of Berrhoe (modern Stara Zagora) against Cuman attacks, alongside Nikephoros Melissenos. In July 1097, after the Siege of Nicaea by the First Crusade, Palaiologos engaged in a violent quarrel with the Norman crusader leader Tancred, who refused to swear allegiance to Alexios.

Likely his last mention was a visit to the hermit (and later saint) Cyril Phileotes, shortly before the latter's death in December 1110. George Palaiologos died sometime between 1118 and 1136, the same as his wife. They both died after their second-born son, Andronikos, and were buried in the same tomb with him.

== Legacy ==
George Palaiologos was the chief source used by Anna Komnene in her Alexiad on her father's battles, and is very favourably portrayed by her in her book as both capable and loyal. The Alexiad is in turn the main source about Palaiologos' life. Anna's positive assessment is also shared by her husband, the general and historian Nikephoros Bryennios the Younger, who calls Palaiologos a "brave warrior, of high military ability".

== Family ==
George Palaiologos had a younger brother, Nicholas. Through his marriage to Anna Doukaina, George had offspring, but their number and identity are not certain. They appear to have had at least three sons.

- Nikephoros, the eldest son, named after his paternal grandfather. His life is little known except for his possible participation in a battle against the Turks in 1116/7 near Philomelion. He was the likely paternal ancestor of the branch of the family that became the Empire's ruling dynasty in 1261.
- Andronikos, the second son, named after his maternal grandfather. He served as doux (military governor) of Thessalonica and died at a young age. He was married, but apparently without offspring.
- Alexios, married Anna Komnene Doukaina, a granddaughter of Alexios I's younger brother Adrianos Komnenos and Zoe, daughter of Emperor Constantine X Doukas (r. 1059–1067). He became the maternal ancestor of the imperial Palaiologos dynasty.

A Michael Palaiologos who was active in a diplomatic and military capacity in 1143–1156 has often been identified as a fourth son of George Palaiologos and Anna Doukaina, but his late chronology mitigates against this view. In all likelihood he was one of their grandsons, likely a son of Nikephoros.

From the marriage of George Palaiologos and Anna Doukaina, the surname Doukas passed into the Palaiologos family, and was often borne as part of their full name by its later members, including the early Palaiologan emperors.

== Bibliography ==
- Angold, Michael (1997). The Byzantine Empire, 1025–1204: A Political History (Second ed.). London and New York: Longman. ISBN 0-582-29468-1.
- Birkenmeier, John W. (2002). The Development of the Komnenian Army: 1081–1180. Brill. ISBN 90-04-11710-5.
- Gautier, Paul (1971). "Le synode des Blachernes (fin 1094). Etude prosopographique" [The Synod of Blachernae (Late 1094). Prosopographical Study]. Revue des études byzantines (in French). 29: 213–284. doi:10.3406/rebyz.1971.1445.
- Kazhdan, Alexander, ed. (1991). The Oxford Dictionary of Byzantium. Oxford and New York: Oxford University Press. ISBN 0-19-504652-8.
- Polemis, Demetrios I. (1968). The Doukai: A Contribution to Byzantine Prosopography. London: The Athlone Press.
- Skoulatos, Basile (1980). Les personnages byzantins de l'Alexiade: Analyse prosopographique et synthèse [The Byzantine Personalities of the Alexiad: Prosopographical Analysis and Synthesis] (in French). Louvain-la-Neuve and Louvain: Bureau du Recueil Collège Érasme and Éditions Nauwelaerts.
- Vannier, Jean-François (1986). "Les premiers Paléologues. Étude généalogique et prosopographique" [The First Palaiologoi. Genealogical and Prosopographical Study]. In Cheynet, Jean-Claude; Vannier, Jean-François (eds.). Études Prosopographiques [Prosopographic Studies] (in French). Paris: Publications de la Sorbonne. pp. 123–186. ISBN 978-2-85944-110-4. OCLC 575241198.
