= George Palaiologos (megas hetaireiarches) =

Byzantine aristocrat

George Palaiologos Doukas Komnenos
- sebastos megas hetaireiarches
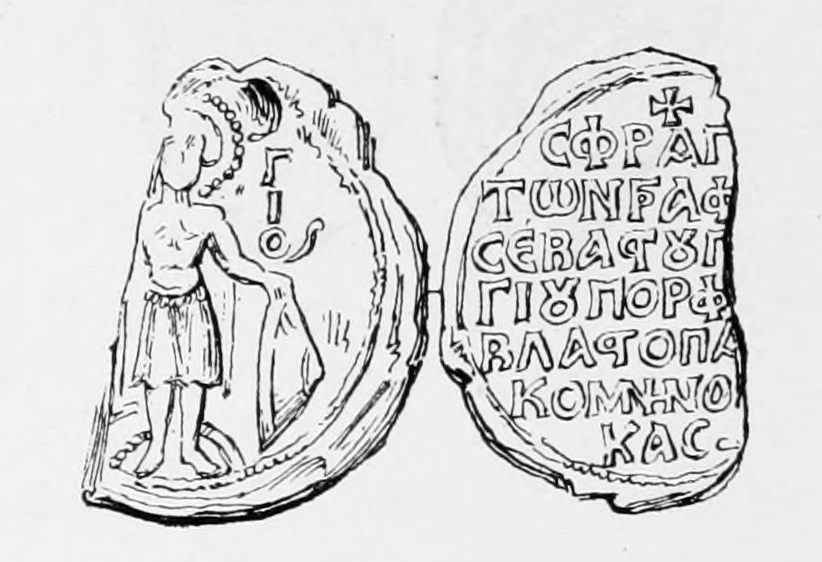
- Seal of George Palaiologos, featuring Saint George on the obverse
- Native name: Γεώργιος Παλαιολόγος Δούκας Κομνηνός
- Born: c. 1125
- Died: 1167 or 1168
- Noble family: Palaiologos
- Issue: Alexios Palaiologos
- Father: Alexios Palaiologos
- Mother: (Anna?) Komnene
- Occupation: Diplomat

George Palaiologos Doukas Komnenos (Greek: Γεώργιος Παλαιολόγος Δούκας Κομνηνός; c. 1125–1167/68) was a high-ranking Byzantine aristocrat and diplomat of the 12th century. A kinsman of the ruling Komnenos dynasty, George Palaiologos held the rank of sebastos and the office of megas hetaireiarches. His son Alexios was briefly heir-apparent to Emperor Alexios III Angelos, and his great-grandson Michael VIII Palaiologos founded the Palaiologan dynasty of Byzantine emperors.

He led a number of diplomatic missions for Emperor Manuel I Komnenos, both within the Empire and abroad. Only his missions to Jerusalem and Hungary, as part of the emperor's marriage alliances with foreign rulers, are well attested. Apart from his diplomatic activities, George Palaiologos also founded a church and a monastery, which were lavishly decorated.

== Life ==
=== Origin ===
George Palaiologos was of distinguished descent. His father was Alexios Palaiologos, the third son of George Palaiologos, a general of Alexios I Komnenos (r. 1081–1118) and Anna Doukaina, sister of Alexios I's empress Irene Doukaina. His mother, likely also named Anna, was the granddaughter of Adrianos Komnenos, a younger brother of Alexios I, and the "purple-born" princess Zoe Doukaina, the third daughter of Emperor Constantine X Doukas (r. 1059–1067). (Note: Modern scholars follow the genealogy identified by O. Lampsidis in one of the elegies of Leo Megistos. Earlier scholars, based on the work of Vitalien Laurent (Les premiers Paléologues, 1933), considered him to be the great-grandson of George Palaiologos. Demetrios Polemis also surmised that his father may have been another son of George Palaiologos, Andronikos Doukas Palaiologos.) As a result, he often used the imperial surnames of Doukas and Komnenos, including in his own seal, and is often referred to as "Komnenodoukas" in poetry composed in his honour.

The exact date of his birth is unknown. The scholar Odysseas Lampsidis estimates his age at the time of his death at 40–45 years. This would put his birth in the years around 1125/6.

=== Diplomatic career ===
He was named sebastos, a honorific title reserved for senior members of the imperial court, and held the office of megas hetaireiarches. It is unknown when he assumed these titles, but was likely appointed to them during the early years of Manuel I Komnenos' reign (1143–1180).

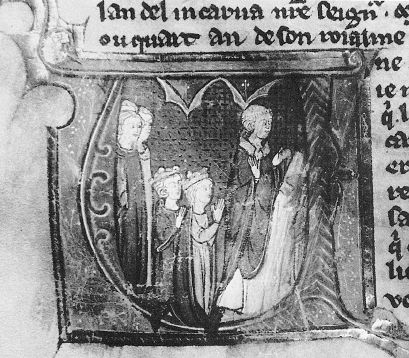
The marriage of Amalric I of Jerusalem and Maria Komnene at Tyre in 1167 (from a manuscript of William of Tyre's Historia, c. 1300)

Although the office of megas hetaireiarches was of military origin, George Palaiologos is only known for his diplomatic career. In 1162 he led a diplomatic mission to Hungary to negotiate the marriage of Manuel I's daughter and heiress, Maria, to the Hungarian prince Béla, and to escort him back to Byzantium. He led a similar mission to the Kingdom of Jerusalem in 1167, escorting Manuel I's niece Maria Komnene to marry King Amalric of Jerusalem.

His secretary, Leo Megistos, wrote at least three monodies in his honour, emphasizing his qualities and his travels in a diplomatic role; according to Leo, these included not only Hungary and Jerusalem, but also Serbia, Italy, the "lands of the Danube", and Germany, as well as the "lands of the Turks". He may also have been sent on missions within the Byzantine Empire, to Greece and, specifically, to the Peloponnese.

=== Other activities ===
George Palaiologos is attested to have been one of the attendants to the Council of Blachernae of March 1166. He was also a patron of the arts. He dedicated a painting of the Archangel Michael in a church in Triaditza, showing himself and his son Alexios with the saint. He also founded a monastery dedicated to the Theotokos, known for its lavish decorations: it included portraits of the emperors whose kinship he claimed, as well as a series of paintings celebrating Manuel I's military victories over the Hungarians. Two of his seals of office survive.

=== Death ===
He died sometime between 1167 and 1170, when his successor, John Doukas, is attested as megas hetaireiarches. A letter by the archbishop and scholar Eustathius of Thessalonica to John Doukas, which mentions the latter as megas hetaireiarches, may be datable as early as 1168. This would place George Palaiologos's death in late 1167 or 1168. According to Leo Megistos, he fell ill at Adrianople while returning from an embassy to Hungary. The mission is not mentioned in other sources, but probably occurred after the Byzantine capture of Sirmium during Emperor Manuel's invasion of Hungary in 1167.

== Family ==
George Palaiologos was survived by his wife and several children, as well as by some of his siblings, of whom only the name of a brother, the sebastos Constantine (fl. 1157–1166), is known. The identity of George Palaiologos' wife is not known, but they probably married around 1145. The couple had at least three children, as two sons and a daughter are mentioned. Only one of his sons, Alexios, is known by name; he eventually became despot and heir-apparent to Emperor Alexios III Angelos (r. 1195–1203) before his death in early 1203. Alexios' daughter Theodora married the megas domestikos (commander-in-chief) Andronikos Palaiologos. They had numerous children, the most prominent of whom was Michael VIII Palaiologos, who became emperor of Nicaea in 1259 and restored the Byzantine Empire in 1261, founding the Palaiologan dynasty. The Greek scholar Konstantinos Varzos suggests that George's second son may have been the protosebastohypertatos Andronikos Palaiologos Doukas Komnenos, a relative of Isaac II Angelos.

== Sources ==
- Kazhdan, Alexander, ed. (1991). The Oxford Dictionary of Byzantium. Oxford and New York: Oxford University Press. ISBN 0-19-504652-8.
- Lampsidis, Odysseas (1970). "Beitrag zur Biographie des Georgios Paläologos des Megas Hetäreiarches" [Contribution to the Biography of George Palaiologos the Megas Hetaireiarches]. Byzantion (in German). 40: 393–407.
- Polemis, Demetrios I. (1968). The Doukai: A Contribution to Byzantine Prosopography. London: The Athlone Press.
- Stiernon, Lucien (1965). "Notes de titulature et de prosopographie byzantines: Sébaste et gambros" [Notes on Byzantine Titulature and Prosopography: Sebastos and Gambros]. Revue des études byzantines. 23: 222–243. doi:10.3406/rebyz.1965.1349.
- Vannier, Jean-François (1986). "Les premiers Paléologues. Étude généalogique et prosopographique" [The First Palaiologoi. Genealogical and Prosopographical Study]. In Cheynet, Jean-Claude; Vannier, Jean-François (eds.). Études Prosopographiques [Prosopographic Studies] (in French). Paris: Publications de la Sorbonne. pp. 123–186. ISBN 978-2-85944-110-4. OCLC 575241198.
- Varzos, Konstantinos (1984). Η Γενεαλογία των Κομνηνών [The Genealogy of the Komnenoi] (PDF) (in Greek). Vol. B. Thessaloniki: Centre for Byzantine Studies, University of Thessaloniki.
