= Andronikos Doukas =

Andronikos Doukas (Greek: Ανδρόνικος Δούκας), Latinized as Andronicus Ducas, may refer to:

- Andronikos Doukas (general under Leo VI) (died c. 910)
- Andronikos Doukas (co-emperor) (c. 1057 – after 1081), Byzantine co-emperor from 1068 to 1078
- Andronikos Doukas (cousin of Michael VII) (died 1077), Byzantine general
- Andronikos Doukas Palaiologos (c. 1083/5 – c. 1115/18), Byzantine governor of Thessalonica
- Andronikos Doukas Angelos (c. 1122 – died after 1185), Byzantine general in Asia Minor
