= Andronikos Doukas Palaiologos =

Andronikos Doukas Palaiologos (Greek: Ἀνδρόνικος Δούκας Παλαιολόγος; c. 1083/85 – c. 1115/18) was a Byzantine aristocrat and governor of Thessalonica early in the 12th century.

== Life ==
Born in c. 1083/85, Andronikos was a son of the sebastos George Palaiologos and his wife Anna Doukaina. His father was the son of the first known member of the Palaiologos line, became a distinguished general and was among the most important supporters of Emperor Alexios I Komnenos (r. 1081–1118), while his mother was the sister of Alexios' empress-consort, Irene Doukaina. Andronikos himself was named after his maternal grandfather Andronikos Doukas, which according to Byzantine custom probably suggests that he was the second-born son (his older brother Nikephoros bearing the paternal grandfather's name); Andronikos seems also to have preferred his mother's surname of Doukas, by which he is referred to in the sources.

Like his father, he held the court dignity of sebastos, but his early life is obscure. The Byzantinist Paul Gautier suggested that he is to be identified with the logothetes ton sekreton (chief minister) Andronikos Doukas, active under Alexios I, possibly after 1109. The only definitive information about his career is that he served as governor of Thessalonica. The Timarion, a satirical dialogue placed in the city, alludes to him without naming him, while an act preserved in the Docheiariou monastery records the "pansebastos sebastos Andronikos Doukas" serving as "doux and praitor" (military and civil governor) of Thessalonica in January/February 1112. According to the historian Konstantinos Varzos, however, the governor of Thessalonica mentioned in the Timarion was not Andronikos, but his younger brother Alexios.

Andronikos died young of heart failure, predeceasing his parents. His death is placed c. 1115/18. According to the historian Demetrios Polemis, he was survived by his wife—Polemis surmises that this was a daughter of the porphyrogennete princess Zoe Doukaina, youngest daughter of Constantine X Doukas and wife of Adrianos Komnenos—and was possibly the father of the megas hetaireiarches George Palaiologos (who may alternatively have been his brother), but Jean-François Vannier believes that he had no offspring. The court poet Nicholas Kallikles wrote an epitaph and four other poems in his honour, and his parents were later buried in the same tomb following their death.

== Sources ==
- Kazhdan, Alexander (1991). "Palaiologos". In Kazhdan, Alexander (ed.). The Oxford Dictionary of Byzantium. Oxford and New York: Oxford University Press. pp. 1557–1560. ISBN 0-19-504652-8.
- Polemis, Demetrios I. (1968). The Doukai: A Contribution to Byzantine Prosopography. London: The Athlone Press.
- Vannier, Jean-François (1986). "Les premiers Paléologues. Étude généalogique et prosopographique" [The First Palaiologoi. Genealogical and Prosopographical Study]. In Cheynet, Jean-Claude; Vannier, Jean-François (eds.). Études Prosopographiques [Prosopographic Studies] (in French). Paris: Publications de la Sorbonne. pp. 123–186. ISBN 978-2-85944-110-4. OCLC 575241198.
- Varzos, Konstantinos (1984). Η Γενεαλογία των Κομνηνών [The Genealogy of the Komnenoi] (PDF) (in Greek). Vol. A2. Thessaloniki: Centre for Byzantine Studies, University of Thessaloniki.

Unknown	Governor of Thessalonica c. 1112	Unknown Title next held by Constantine Doukas (1118)
