= Maria Komnene (daughter of Alexios I) =

- Born: 19 September 1085
- Died: after 1136
- Spouse: Nikephoros Katakalon
- Issue: Alexios; Andronikos Euphorbenos; John; At least three daughters
- House: Komnenos
- Father: Alexios I Komnenos
- Mother: Irene Doukaina

Maria Komnene (Greek: Μαρία Κομνηνή; 19 September 1085 – after 1136) was the second daughter of the Byzantine emperor Alexios I Komnenos. She was initially betrothed to Gregory Gabras, but married to Nikephoros Katakalon.

== Life ==
Maria Komnene was born on Friday, 19 September 1085, as the second daughter and second child of the Byzantine emperor Alexios I Komnenos (r. 1081–1118) and Empress Irene Doukaina. As the daughter of a reigning emperor, she bore the title of porphyrogennete ("purpleborn").

In 1094 she was betrothed to Gregory Gabras, the son of the doux of Chaldia Theodore Gabras. After Gregory tried to escape the palace and flee to his father, he was placed under arrest, and the betrothal was annulled.

Eventually, in c. 1099/1100 Maria married Nikephoros Katakalon, the son of Constantine Euphorbenos Katakalon, one of Alexios' most prominent and trusted generals. On the occasion, Nikephoros Katakalon was given the title of panhypersebastos. Along with her mother and her sisters, Maria attended her dying father in 1118.

Her husband died young, sometime between 1118 and 1130. Maria and Nikephoros had a number of children, but only two sons, Alexios Komnenos and Andronikos, are known by name, having held senior positions later in the century. Another son, John, is known only by his commemoration in the typikon of the Monastery of Christ Philanthropos.

The couple also had an unknown number of daughters (at least three according to Varzos), as their existence is mentioned in the typikon of the Kecharitomene Monastery. This convent was founded by Irene Doukaina, who had originally decreed that her younger daughter Eudokia should succeed her as patroness; after Eudokia died (c. 1130), Irene chose her oldest daughter, the scholar, physician, hospital administrator, and historian Anna Komnene instead, with Maria after her. The date of Maria's death is unknown, except that it occurred after 1136, when the deceased members of the imperial family were listed in the typikon of the Pantokrator Monastery.

In her Alexiad, her older sister Anna Komnene speaks with great affection and praise for her virtue, especially for her actions during their father's final days.

== Sources ==
- Kazhdan, Alexander, ed. (1991). The Oxford Dictionary of Byzantium. Oxford and New York: Oxford University Press. ISBN 0-19-504652-8.
- Kouroupou, Matoula; Vannier, Jean-François (2005). "Commémoraisons des Comnènes dans le typikon liturgique du monastère du Christ Philanthrope (ms. Panaghia Kamariotissa 29)" [Commemorations of the Komnenoi in the liturgical typikon of the Monastery of Christ Philanthropos (ms. Panaghia Kamariotissa 29)]. Revue des études byzantines (in French). 63: 41–69. doi:10.3406/rebyz.2005.2305.
- Skoulatos, Basile (1980). Les personnages byzantins de l'Alexiade: Analyse prosopographique et synthèse [The Byzantine Personalities of the Alexiad: Prosopographical Analysis and Synthesis] (in French). Louvain-la-Neuve and Louvain: Bureau du Recueil Collège Érasme and Éditions Nauwelaerts.
- Varzos, Konstantinos (1984). Η Γενεαλογία των Κομνηνών [The Genealogy of the Komnenoi] (PDF) (in Greek). Vol. A1. Thessaloniki: Centre for Byzantine Studies, University of Thessaloniki.
