= Andronikos Euphorbenos =

Byzantine aristocrat and military commander

Andronikos Komnenos Euphorbenos (Greek: Ἀνδρόνικος Κομνηνός Εὐφορβηνός; 1105/8 – after 1163) was a Byzantine aristocrat and military commander, who served as governor of Cilicia in 1162–1163.

Andronikos Euphorbenos was the second son of Nikephoros Euphorbenos Katakalon and the purple-born princess Maria Komnene, a daughter of Emperor Alexios I Komnenos (r. 1081–1118). He was likely born around 1105/1108, but his life is mostly obscure; it is unknown whether he married or had offspring. In February 1147, along with his older brother Alexios, he attended a church synod at the Palace of Blachernae, which deposed Patriarch Kosmas II Attikos.

Euphorbenos followed a military career, but the only office he is known to have held was that of doux (regional military governor) of Cilicia, which he held in 1162–1163. In Cilicia he was confronted by the local Armenian lord, Thoros II, who aimed to reassert the region's independence from the Byzantine rule. Following the Cilician campaign of Emperor Manuel I Komnenos (r. 1143–1180) in 1158, Thoros had recognized the emperor's suzerainty. While the Byzantines established their control over the Cilician plain, Thoros remained free, and in control of his own military forces and the mountainous interior, as the emperor's nominal vassal. In 1162, Thoros' half-brother, Stephen, was found murdered outside the walls of Tarsus, after being invited by Euphorbenos to a banquet in the city the previous day. Even though Stephen was a rival, this provided Thoros with a suitable pretext for attacking the Byzantine holdings in the area, although Euphorbenos strenuously denied any involvement in the deed. Euphorbenos was unable to stop the Armenian prince, who captured the fortresses of Mamistra, Anazarbus and Vahka and massacred their garrisons. In the interest of unity against the Muslims, King Amalric of Jerusalem mediated between Thoros and the Byzantines, leading to Euphorbenos being recalled and replaced with Constantine Kalamanos.

His subsequent fate is unknown.

== Sources ==
- Der Nersessian, Sirarpie (1969) [1962]. "The Kingdom of Cilician Armenia". In Setton, Kenneth M.; Wolff, Robert Lee; Hazard, Harry W. (eds.). A History of the Crusades, Volume II: The Later Crusades, 1189–1311. Vol. 2 (Second ed.). Madison, Milwaukee, and London: University of Wisconsin Press. pp. 630–659. ISBN 0-299-04844-6.
- Kazhdan, Alexander, ed. (1991). The Oxford Dictionary of Byzantium. Oxford and New York: Oxford University Press. ISBN 0-19-504652-8.
- Varzos, Konstantinos (1984). Η Γενεαλογία των Κομνηνών [The Genealogy of the Komnenoi] (PDF) (in Greek). Vol. A1. Thessaloniki: Centre for Byzantine Studies, University of Thessaloniki.
