= Cyril Phileotes =

Cyril of Philea or Phileotes (Greek: Κύριλλος ὁ Φιλεώτης; c. 1015 – 2 December 1110) was a Byzantine ascetic and saint.

Cyril was born in the village of Philea, near Derkos, around 1015. 'Cyril' is his monastic name, his birth name is unknown. He led an active life before becoming a monk, working three years as a sailor, marrying at a young age and having children. He was widely travelled for the time, even visiting Rome on one occasion. Cyril was early on drawn to monastic life and restricted his diet and sexual life accordingly. He also built within his house a small cell where he could kneel and pray. Eventually he entered a monastery in his home village, founded by his brother Michael.

Cyril was well known to the religious circles of Constantinople—he used to walk every Friday from his home village to attend the service at the Church of St. Mary of Blachernae. Anna Dalassena, mother of the future Emperor Alexios I Komnenos, patronized Cyril even before he entered a monastery, well before her son's accession to the throne in 1081. As Cyril's reputation and fame grew, he became connected to a number of prominent court figures of the early Komnenian period, such as George Palaiologos or Eumathios Philokales. Alexios I also used to take his family on day trips from Constantinople to visit Cyril at his monastery, to which he later granted a full tax exemption.

Cyril died on 2 December 1110. His hagiography was written by Nicholas Kataskepenos within a few years after his death. The hagiography was published in a critical edition by E. Sargologos: La Vie de saint Cyrille le Philéote, moine byzantin (†1110), Brussels 1964.

== Sources ==
- Angold, Michael (1995). Church and Society in Byzantium under the Comneni, 1081–1261. Cambridge University Press. ISBN 0-521-26432-4.
- Kazhdan, Alexander (1991). "Cyril Phileotes". In Kazhdan, Alexander (ed.). The Oxford Dictionary of Byzantium. Oxford and New York: Oxford University Press. pp. 573–574. ISBN 0-19-504652-8.
- Mullett, Margaret (2002). "Theophylact of Ohrid's In Defence of Eunuchs". In Shaun Tougher (ed.). Eunuchs in Antiquity and Beyond. The Classical Press of Wales and Duckworth. pp. 177–198. ISBN 0-7156-3129-2.
