= Temple of the Sebastoi =

Roman temple

The Temple of the Sebastoi in Ephesus, formerly called the Temple of Domitian, is a Roman temple dedicated to the Imperial cult of the Flavian dynasty. It was dedicated in CE 89/90 under the reign of Domitian. Its contemporary name is known from an adjacent inscription.

"Sebastoi" (lit. 'venerable ones') refers to the imperial dynasty; it is the plural of sebastos, the Greek rendering of the Roman imperial title Augustus.

The city of Ephesus was the first to be named neokoros (lit. 'temple-warden') thanks to this temple.

== See also ==
- List of Ancient Roman temples

== Bibliography ==
- Steven J. Friesen, Twice Neokoros: Ephesus, Asia & the Cult of the Flavian Imperial Family, Brill, 1993.
