= Constantine Euphorbenos Katakalon =

Byzantine noble and general

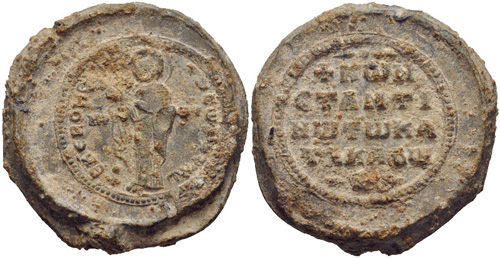
Seal of Constantine Euphorbenos Katakalon

Constantine Euphorbenos Katakalon (Greek: Κωνσταντῖνος Εὐφορβηνὸς Κατακαλών) (Note: The name is also found in the sources as Constantine Katakalon, Constantine Euphorbenos or Euphorbenos Katakalon.) was a Byzantine noble and one of the most prominent generals of the reign of Alexios I Komnenos (r. 1081–1118).

A descendant of the noble Katakalon and Euphorbenos families, Constantine is first mentioned in the sources when he commanded the Chomatenoi corps and the Turkish contingent of Alexios Komnenos' army in the Battle of Kalavrye in 1078.

He appears again in the lists of the Synod of Blachernae in 1094, bearing the title of protokouropalates, and ranking in the 20th place among those aristocrats and court officials attending. In the next year, he took part in Alexios' campaign against the Cumans and the impostor pretender Constantine Diogenes. Alexios sent him to attack the Cumans while they were crossing the Zygos pass, but the latter, guided by local Vlachs, managed to cross the pass sooner and seize the town of Goloe. Katakalon nevertheless attacked the Cuman foraging parties and managed to capture about a hundred prisoners, for which he was promoted to nobelissimos. He was next dispatched to assist the city of Adrianople, which was being besieged by the Cumans. He attempted to enter the city from the south, but was surprised by the Cumans on the march, and barely escaped with his life. Shortly after, he assisted Alakaseus in capturing the pretender at Poutza near Adrianople.

In 1096, the emperor sent him to rescue the remnants of the People's Crusade, which had been defeated and almost destroyed by the Seljuks at the Battle of Civetot. The Turks withdrew before his advance, and Katakalon managed to rescue the surviving crusaders. In c. 1100, he was named doux (military governor) of Cyprus, and held that post at least until 1102/04. One of his surviving seals mentions him as both doux of Cyprus and kouropalates, rather than nobelissimos; this may imply that Katakalon had already served in this post before, prior to his promotion.

In 1108, Katakalon was part of an embassy sent by Alexios to Bohemond, who was besieging the imperial fortress of Dyrrhachium. The Byzantine delegation convinced the Norman prince to seek a settlement with the Empire, and accompanied him to the imperial camp at Deabolis, where the namesake treaty was signed.

Katakalon was one of Alexios' most trusted and esteemed officials. In token of this, his son Nikephoros was given the hand of Maria Komnene, the emperor's second daughter, in marriage. Together they had several children.

== Sources ==
- Gautier, Paul (1971). "Le synode des Blachernes (fin 1094). Étude prosopographique" [The Synod of Blachernae (end of 1094). A Prosopographical Study]. Revue des études byzantines (in French). 29: 213–284. doi:10.3406/rebyz.1971.1445.
- Kazhdan, Alexander, ed. (1991). The Oxford Dictionary of Byzantium. Oxford and New York: Oxford University Press. ISBN 0-19-504652-8.
- Skoulatos, Basile (1980). Les personnages byzantins de l'Alexiade: Analyse prosopographique et synthèse [The Byzantine Personalities of the Alexiad: Prosopographical Analysis and Synthesis] (in French). Louvain-la-Neuve and Louvain: Bureau du Recueil Collège Érasme and Éditions Nauwelaerts. OCLC 8468871.
