= Michael Kourtikios =

Michael Kourtikios (Greek: Μιχαήλ Κουρτίκιος) was a senior Byzantine military commander and a partisan of Bardas Skleros during the latter's rebellion against Basil II.

== Biography ==
The Kourtikios or Kourtikes family was Armenian in origin and entered Byzantine service under Basil I the Macedonian (r. 867–886), when its eponymous founder, K'urdik, ceded his fortress of Lokana to the Empire.

Nothing is known of Michael Kourtikios' early life and career, although a seal of his attests his holding the post of topoteretes of Thrace. In 976, the general Bardas Skleros rebelled against Basil II (r. 976–1025) with the backing of the eastern themes. In late 976 or early 977 he crossed the Anti-Taurus Mountains and defeated a loyalist army at Lapara. This event strengthened Skleros' position and led to the defection of several high-ranking officers. According to the account of the late 11th-century historian John Skylitzes, following Skleros' victory at Lapara, in Attaleia, the capital of the Cibyrrhaeot Theme, the populace rose up in his support. They took the local admiral prisoner and offered their services, along with the entire thematic fleet, to Skleros, who placed Kourtikios as the new commander of the Cibyrrhaeots. Leo the Deacon, however, who was a contemporary to the rebellion, reports that this happened only later, in 978, after Skleros scored a victory against the loyalist general Bardas Phokas the Younger, that Attaleia went over to the rebel. Werner Seibt, followed by other scholars like Alexander Kazhdan and Michael Whittow, furthermore suggested that Kourtikios was actually the admiral deposed by the Attaleians, who then switched his allegiance to Skleros.

According to Skylitzes, Kourtikios attacked and raided several Aegean islands, and prepared to capture Abydos on the Hellespont, thereby cutting Constantinople's seaborne links to the western provinces still loyal to Basil, as well as allowing Skleros to ferry his troops over to Europe. Skylitzes reports that then he was defeated in a major battle off Phocaea by the Droungarios of the Imperial Fleet, Theodore Karantenos. Leo the Deacon on the other hand records that the Imperial Fleet was led by Bardas Parsakountenos, who defeated a rebel fleet off Abydos through the use of Greek fire. Modern scholars therefore suggest that there may have been two naval engagements, one under Parsakountenos off Abydos, and one under Karantenos—who accordingly was probably a thematic strategos rather than the droungarios of the Imperial Fleet—against Kourtikios off Phocaea.

== Sources ==
- Holmes, Catherine (2005). Basil II and the Governance of Empire (976–1025). Oxford: Oxford University Press. ISBN 978-0-19-927968-5.
- Kazhdan, Alexander, ed. (1991). The Oxford Dictionary of Byzantium. Oxford and New York: Oxford University Press. ISBN 0-19-504652-8.
- Lilie, Ralph-Johannes; Ludwig, Claudia; Pratsch, Thomas; Zielke, Beate (2013). Prosopographie der mittelbyzantinischen Zeit Online. Berlin-Brandenburgische Akademie der Wissenschaften. Nach Vorarbeiten F. Winkelmanns erstellt (in German). Berlin and Boston: De Gruyter.
- Whittow, Mark (1996). The Making of Byzantium, 600–1025. Berkeley and Los Angeles, California: University of California Press. ISBN 978-0-520-20496-6.
- Wortley, John, ed. (2010). John Skylitzes: A Synopsis of Byzantine History, 811–1057. Cambridge: Cambridge University Press. ISBN 978-0-521-76705-7.
