= Battle of Dyrrhachium (1081) =

Part of the First Norman invasion of the Balkans

Coordinates: 41.3°N 19.5°E

- Part of the First Norman invasion of the Balkans
- First Norman invasion of the Balkans
Date	October 18, 1081
Location	Dyrrhachium
Result	Norman victory

Belligerents
Byzantine Empire	Duchy of Apulia and Calabria Kingdom of Croatia

Commanders and leaders
Alexios I Komnenos; George Palaiologos; Gregory Pakourianos; Nikephoros Melissenos; Nikephoros Palaiologos † Komiskortes	Robert Guiscard; Bohemond of Taranto; Sichelgaita of Salerno; Amicus of Giovinazzo Demetrius Zvonimir

Strength
20,000–25,000	15,000

Casualties and losses
5,000 dead, 7,000 deserted	

The Battle of Dyrrhachium took place on October 18, 1081 between the Byzantine Empire, led by the Emperor Alexios I Komnenos (r. 1081–1118), and the Normans of southern Italy under Robert Guiscard, Duke of Apulia and Calabria. The battle was fought outside the city of Dyrrhachium (present-day Durrës in Albania), the major Byzantine stronghold in the western Balkans, and ended in a Norman victory.

Following the Norman conquest of Byzantine Italy and Saracen Sicily, the Byzantine emperor, Michael VII Doukas (r. 1071–1078), betrothed his son to Robert Guiscard's daughter. When Michael was deposed, Robert took this as an excuse to invade the Byzantine Empire in 1081. His army laid siege to Dyrrhachium, but his fleet was defeated by the Venetians. On October 18, the Normans engaged a Byzantine army under Alexios I Komnenos outside Dyrrhachium. The battle began with the Byzantine right wing routing the Norman left wing, which broke and fled. Varangian troops joined in the pursuit of the fleeing Normans, but became separated from the main force and were massacred. Norman knights attacked the Byzantine centre and routed it, causing the bulk of the Byzantine army to rout.

After this victory, the Normans took Dyrrhachium in February 1082 and advanced inland, capturing most of Macedonia and Thessaly. Robert was then forced to leave Greece to deal with an attack on his ally, the Pope, by the Holy Roman Emperor, Henry IV (r. 1084–1105). Robert left his son Bohemond in charge of the army in Greece. Bohemond was initially successful, defeating Alexios in several battles, but was defeated by Alexios outside Larissa in 1083. Forced to retreat to Italy, Bohemond lost all the territory gained by the Normans in the campaign. The Byzantine recovery began the Komnenian restoration.

== Background ==
The Normans first arrived in Southern Italy in 1015 from northern France and served local Lombard lords as mercenaries against the Byzantine Empire. As they were paid with lands, soon they were powerful enough to challenge Papal authority; in 1054, they defeated the Papal States at the Battle of Civitate, forcing the Holy See to acknowledge their authority. In 1059, Pope Nicholas II made Robert Guiscard, of the Hauteville family, Duke of Apulia, Calabria, and Sicily. However, most of Apulia and Calabria were in Byzantine hands, and Sicily was in Saracen hands.

By 1071, Robert, together with his brother Roger, had taken over the last Byzantine stronghold in Italy, Bari. By the next year, they conquered all of Sicily, ending the Islamic Emirate of Sicily. In 1074, the Byzantine Emperor Michael VII sent an envoy to Robert offering the hand of his son Constantine to Robert's daughter Helena. Guiscard accepted the offer and sent his daughter to Constantinople. However, in 1078, Michael was overthrown by Nicephorus Botaneiates, an event that destroyed any chances Helena had for the throne. This gave Robert a pretext to invade the empire claiming his daughter had been mistreated; however, his intervention was delayed by a revolt in Italy.

Robert conscripted all men of a fighting age into the army, which he refitted. Meanwhile, he sent an ambassador to the Byzantine court with orders to demand proper treatment for Helena and to win over the Domestic of the Schools, Alexios. The results of these attempts remain unknown, but the ambassador was favorably impressed by Alexios and as he was returning to Italy, he heard of the latters's successful coup against Botaneiates, by which he became Alexios I Komnenos.

When the ambassador returned, he urged Robert to make peace, claiming that Alexios wanted nothing but friendship with the Normans. However, Robert had already committed himself to war; he sent his son Bohemond with an advance force towards Greece and Bohemond landed at Aulon, with Robert following shortly after.

== Prelude ==
"Not being satisfied with the men who had served in his army from the beginning and had experience in battle, he (Robert Guiscard) formed a new army, made up of recruits without any consideration of age. From all quarters of Lombardy and Apulia he gathered them, over age and under age, pitiable objects who had never seen armour in their dreams, but then clad in breastplates and carrying shields, awkwardly drawing bows to which they were completely unused and following flat on the ground when they were allowed to march...Yet, however unused to soldiering they were, he (Robert Guiscard) trained them daily and hammered his recruits into a disciplined force. This was his business in Salerno before he arrived in Otranto."

— Anna Comnena describing Robert Guiscard's conscription.

The Norman fleet of 150 ships including 60 horse transports set off towards the Byzantine Empire at the end of May 1081. The army numbered 15,000 men, including about 1,300 Norman knights. The fleet sailed to Avalona in Byzantine territory; they were joined by several ships from Ragusa, a republic in the Balkans who were enemies of the Byzantines. Pope Gregory VII called the Croatian king Demetrius Zvonimir to help the Normans, therefore the Croats and the Normans made a anti-byzantine pact.

Robert soon left Avalona and sailed to the island of Corfu, which surrendered because of a small garrison. Having won a bridgehead and a clear path for reinforcements from Italy, he advanced on the city of Dyrrhachium, the capital and chief port of Illyria. The city was well defended on a long, narrow peninsula running parallel to the coast, but separated by marshlands. Guiscard brought his army onto the peninsula and pitched camp outside the city walls. However, as Robert's fleet sailed to Dyrrhachium, it was hit by a storm and lost several ships.

Meanwhile, when Alexios heard that the Normans were preparing to invade Byzantine territory, he sent an ambassador to the Doge of Venice, Domenico Selvo, requesting aid and offering trading rights in return. The Doge, alarmed by Norman control of the Strait of Otranto, took command of the Venetian fleet and sailed at once, surprising the Norman fleet under the command of Bohemond as night was falling. The Normans counter-attacked tenaciously, but their inexperience in naval combat betrayed them. The experienced Venetian navy attacked in a close formation known as "sea harbour" and together with their use of Greek fire "bombs", the Norman line scattered, and the Venetian fleet sailed into Dyrrhachium's harbour.

== Siege of Dyrrhachium ==
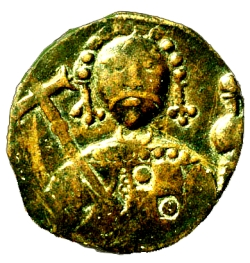
Coin of Robert Guiscard

Robert was not discouraged by this naval defeat, and began his siege of Dyrrhachium. In command of the garrison at Dyrrhachium was the experienced general George Palaiologos, sent by Alexios with orders to hold out at all costs while Alexios himself mustered an army to relieve the city.

Meanwhile, a Byzantine fleet arrived and – after joining with the Venetian fleet – attacked the Norman fleet, which was again defeated. The Byzantine garrison at Dyrrhachium managed to hold out all summer, despite Robert's catapults, ballistae and siege tower. The garrison made continuous sallies from the city; on one occasion, Palaiologos fought all day with an arrowhead in his skull. Another sally succeeded in destroying Robert's siege tower.

Robert's camp was struck by disease; according to contemporary historian Anna Comnena up to 10,000 men died, including 500 knights. Even so, the situation of the Dyrrhachium garrison grew desperate because of the effects of Norman siege weapons. Alexios learned of this while he was in Salonica with his army so he advanced in full force against the Normans. According to Comnena, Alexios had about 20,000 men; historian John Haldon puts the army's size between 18,000 and 20,000 men, while John Birkenmeier estimates it between 20–25,000 men. It consisted of Thracian and Macedonian tagmata, which numbered about 5,000 men; the elite excubitors and vestiaritai units, which numbered around 1,000 men; a force of Manichaeans which comprised 2,800 men, Thessalian cavalry, Balkan conscripts, Armenian infantry and other light troops. Aside from the Byzantine regulars, Alexios was bolstered by 2,000 Turkish and 1,000 Frankish mercenaries, about 1,000 Varangians and 7,000 Turkish auxiliaries sent by the Seljuk Sultanate of Rûm. Alexios also withdrew the tagmas from Heraclea Pontica and the remaining Byzantine holdings in Asia Minor and by doing so, he effectively left them undefended.

== Battle ==
=== Initial moves ===
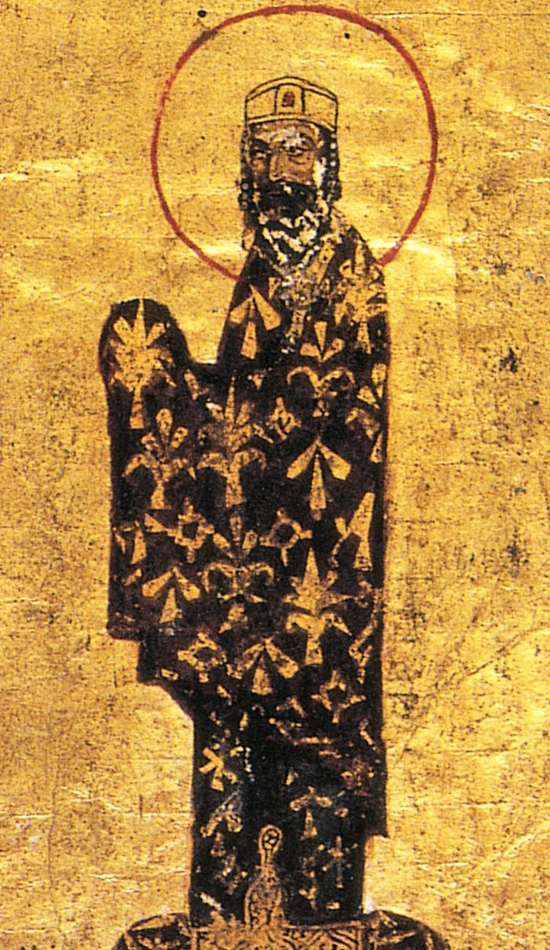
A manuscript depicting Alexios

Alexios advanced from Salonica and pitched camp on the river Charzanes near Dyrrhachium on October 15. He held a war council there and sought advice from his senior officers; among them was George Palaiologos, who had managed to sneak out of the city. A majority of the senior officers, including Palaiologos, urged caution, noting that time was with the Emperor. Alexios, however, favoured an immediate assault, hoping to catch Guiscard's army from the rear, while they were still besieging the city. Alexios moved his army to the hills opposite the city, planning to attack the Normans the next day.

Guiscard, however, had been informed of Alexios' arrival by his scouts and on the night of October 17, he moved his army from the peninsula to the mainland. Upon learning of Guiscard's move, Alexios revised his battle plan. He split his army into three divisions, with the left wing under the command of Gregory Pakourianos, the right wing under the command of Nikephoros Melissenos, and himself in command of the centre. Guiscard formed his battle line opposite Alexios's, with the right wing under the command of the Count of Giovinazzo, the left under Bohemond and Guiscard facing Alexios in the centre.

The Varangians had been ordered to march just in front of the main line with a strong division of archers a little behind them. The archers had been commanded to move in front of the Varangians and loose a volley before retreating behind them. The archers continued this tactic until the army neared contact.

As the opposing armies closed in, Guiscard sent a detachment of cavalry positioned in the centre to feint an attack on the Byzantine positions. Guiscard hoped the feint would draw up the Varangians; however, this plan failed when the cavalry was forced back by the archers. The Norman right wing suddenly charged forward to the point where the Byzantine left and centre met, directing its attack against the Varangian left flank. The Varangians stood their ground while the Byzantine left, including some of Alexios' elite troops, attacked the Normans. The Norman formation disintegrated and the routed Normans fled towards the beach. There, according to Comnena, they were rallied by Guiscard's wife, Sikelgaita, described as "like another Pallas, if not a second Athena".

=== Byzantine collapse ===
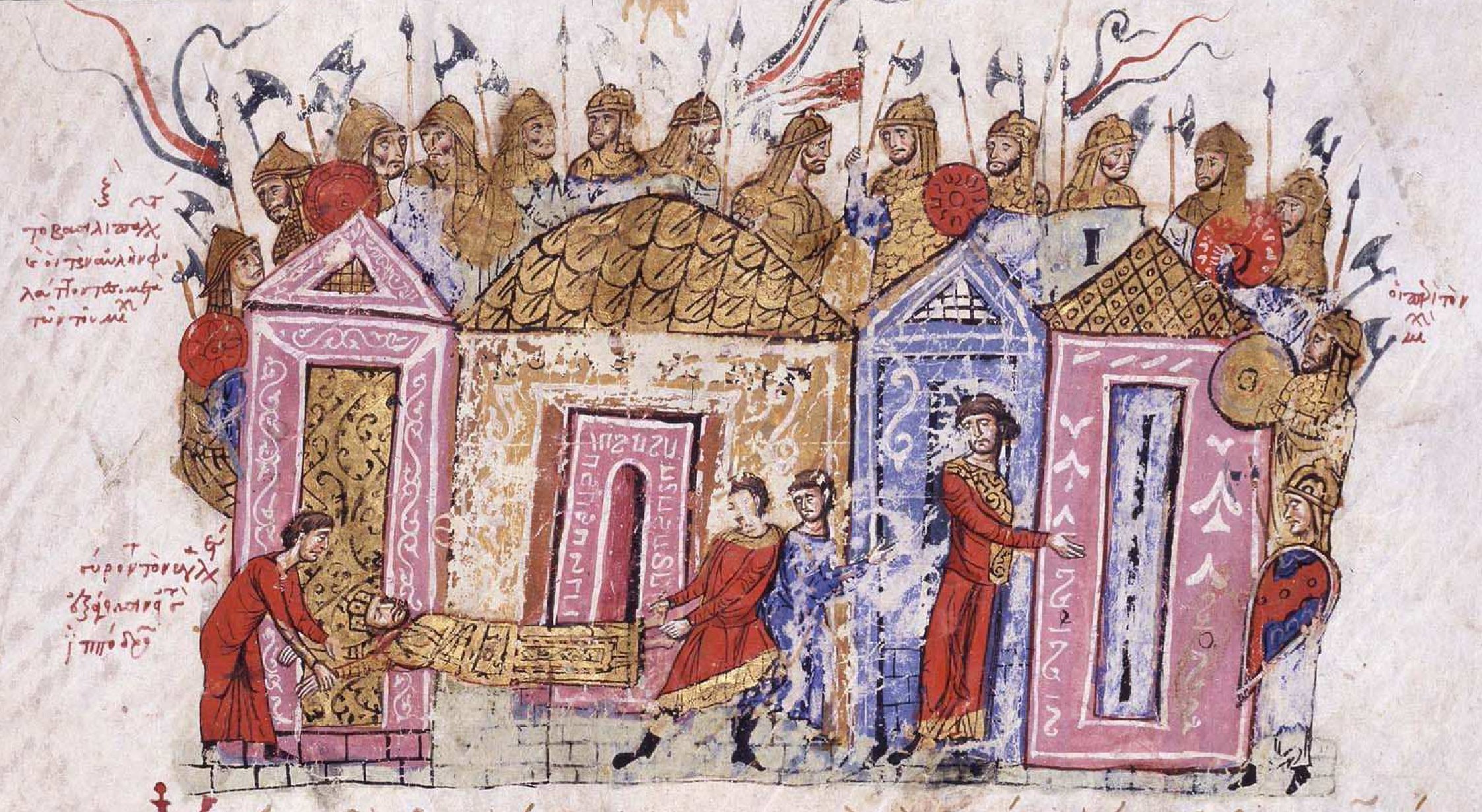
The Varangian Guard

In the meantime, the Byzantine right and centre had been engaging in skirmishes with the Normans opposite them. However, with the collapse of the Norman right, the knights were in danger of being outflanked. At this point, the Varangians (mainly Anglo-Saxons who had left England after the Norman Conquest) joined in the pursuit of the Norman right. With their massive battle axes, the Varangians attacked the Norman knights, who were driven away after their horses panicked. The Varangians soon became separated from the main force and exhausted so they were in no position to resist an assault. Guiscard sent a strong force of spearmen and crossbowmen against the Varangian flank and inflicted heavy casualties on them. A few Varangians, including the Varangian commander Nabites, escaped. The few remaining Varangians fled into the church of the Archangel Michael. The Normans immediately set the church on fire, and all Varangians perished in the blaze.

Meanwhile, George Palaiologos sortied out of Dyrrhachium, but failed to save the situation. Alexios's ally, Serbian King Constantine Bodin stayed aside with his army, intending to await the outcome of the battle. When the Byzantines were defeated and started to flee, Bodin retreated with his army. The Turks who had been lent to him by the Seljuk Sultan Suleyman I followed Constantine's example.

Deprived of his left wing (still in pursuit of the Norman right), Alexios was exposed in the centre. Guiscard sent his heavy cavalry against the Byzantine centre. They first routed the Byzantine skirmishers before breaking into small detachments and smashing into various points of the Byzantine line. This charge broke the Byzantine lines and caused them to rout. The imperial camp, which had been left unguarded, fell to the Normans.

Alexios and his guards resisted as long as they could before retreating. As they retreated, Alexios was separated from his guard and was attacked by Norman soldiers. While escaping, he was wounded in his forehead and lost a lot of blood, but eventually made it back to Ohrid, where he regrouped his army.

== Aftermath ==
"Alexios was undoubtedly a good tactician, but he was badly let down by the undisciplined rush to pursue the beaten enemy wings, a cardinal sin in the Byzantine tactical manuals. He failed to take adequate account of the effectiveness of the Norman heavy cavalry charge, which punched through his lines with little resistance."

— John Haldon's assessment of the battle.

The battle was a heavy defeat for Alexios. Historian Jonathan Harris states that the defeat was "every bit as severe as that at Manzikert." He lost about 5,000 of his men, including most of the Varangians. Norman losses are unknown, but John Haldon claims they are substantial as both wings broke and fled. Historian Robert Holmes states: "The new knightly tactic of charging with the lance couched – tucked firmly under the arm to unite the impact of man and horse – proved a battle-winner."

George Palaiologos had not been able to re-enter the city after the battle and left with the main force. The defense of the citadel was left to the Venetians, while the city itself was left to the Count of the Tent mobilizing from Arbanon (Ancient Greek: ἐξ Ἀρβάνων ὁρμωμένω Κομισκόρτη).

In February 1082, Dyrrhachium fell after a Venetian or Amalfian citizen opened the gates to the Normans. The Norman army proceeded to take most of northern Greece without facing much resistance. While Guiscard was in Kastoria, messengers arrived from Italy, bearing news that Apulia, Calabria, and Campania were in revolt. He also learned that the Holy Roman Emperor, Henry IV, was at the gates of Rome and besieging Pope Gregory VII, a Norman ally. Alexios had negotiated with Henry and given him 360,000 gold pieces in return for an alliance. Henry responded by invading Italy and attacking the Pope. Guiscard rushed to Italy, leaving Bohemond in command of the army in Greece.

Alexios, desperate for money, ordered the confiscation of all the church's treasure. With this money, Alexios mustered an army near Thessalonica and went to fight Bohemond. However, Bohemond defeated Alexios in two battles: one near Arta and the other near Ioannina. This left Bohemond in control of Macedonia and nearly all of Thessaly. Bohemond advanced with his army against the city of Larissa. Meanwhile, Alexios had mustered a new army and with 7,000 Seljuk Turks sent by the Sultan, he advanced on the Normans at Larissa and defeated them. The demoralised and unpaid Norman army returned to the coast and sailed back to Italy. Meanwhile, Alexios granted the Venetians a commercial colony in Constantinople, as well as exemption from trading duties in return for their renewed aid. They responded by recapturing Dyrrhachium and Corfu and returning them to the Byzantine Empire. These victories returned the Empire to its previous status quo and marked the beginning of the Komnenian restoration.

== Sources ==
=== Primary ===
- Comnena, Anna (1996). The Alexiad. Translated by Sewter, E. R. A. London: Penguin Books. ISBN 0-14-044215-4.

=== Secondary ===
- Birkenmeier, John W. (2002). The Development of the Komnenian Army: 1081–1180. Boston, Massachusetts: Brill. ISBN 90-04-11710-5.
- Brown, Reginald Allen (1984). The Normans. Woodridge: Boydell Press. ISBN 0-85115-199-X.
- Cross, Robin (1991). The Guinness Encyclopedia of Warfare. Enfield: Guinness Publishing. ISBN 0-85112-985-4.
- D'Amato, Raffaele; Rava, Giuseppe (2010). The Varangian Guard 988–1453. Long Island City, New York and Oxford, United Kingdom: Osprey Publishing. ISBN 978-1-84908-179-5.
- France, John (1999). Western Warfare in the Age of the Crusades: 1000–1300. Ithaca, New York: Cornell University Press. ISBN 0-8014-3671-0.
- Gravett, Christopher; Nicolle, David (2006). The Normans: Warrior Knights and their Castles. Oxford, United Kingdom: Osprey Publishing. ISBN 1-84603-088-9.
- Haldon, John F. (2001). The Byzantine Wars: Battles and Campaigns of the Byzantine Era. Stroud, Gloucestershire: Tempus Publishing. ISBN 0-7524-1795-9.
- Harris, Jonathan (2003). Byzantium and the Crusades. London, United Kingdom: Hambledon and London. ISBN 1-85285-298-4.
- Holmes, Richard (1988). The World Atlas of Warfare: Military Innovations that Changed the Course of History. Viking Studio Books. ISBN 0-670-81967-0.
- Hooper, Nicholas; Bennett, Matthew (1996). The Cambridge Illustrated Atlas of Warfare: The Middle Ages, 768–1487. Cambridge, United Kingdom: Cambridge University Press. ISBN 0-521-44049-1.
- Norwich, John Julius (1995). Byzantium: The Decline and Fall. London, United Kingdom: Viking. ISBN 0-670-82377-5.
- Treadgold, Warren T. (1997). A History of the Byzantine State and Society. Stanford, California: Stanford University Press. ISBN 0-804-72630-2.
- Vranousi, Era A. (1962). "Κομισκόρτης ο έξ Αρβάνων": Σχόλια εις Χωρίον της Άννης Κομνηνής (Δ' 8,4) (in Greek). Ioannina: Εταιρείας Ηπειρωτικών Μελετών.
