= Nikephoros Palaiologos =

Byzantine general

Nikephoros Palaiologos (Greek: Νικηφόρος Παλαιολόγος; died 18 October 1081) was a Byzantine general of the 11th century.

== Biography ==
Nikephoros is the first known member of the Palaiologos family, which would eventually rise to become the last ruling dynasty of the Byzantine Empire from 1259 to 1453. He had two sons, George and Nicholas. George Palaiologos also became a general and was one of the chief supporters of Emperor Alexios I Komnenos (r. 1081–1118). Through George and his great-great-grandson Andronikos Palaiologos, the later Palaiologan dynasty draws its descent.

Nikephoros is first attested during the short reign of Romanos IV Diogenes (r. 1068–1071). According to the 12th-century Timarion, he hailed from "Great Phrygia", i.e., the Anatolic Theme, where he ranked among the most distinguished and wealthy locals. A partisan of the Doukas dynasty, he was hostile to Romanos and a member of the opposition around the Caesar John Doukas and Michael Psellos. Nikephoros opposed Diogenes's plans to campaign against the Seljuk Turks in the east, a campaign that ultimately led to the disastrous Battle of Manzikert and Diogenes's downfall.

In 1075, Nikephoros was dispatched east against the Norman mercenary Roussel de Bailleul, who had rebelled against imperial rule. After gathering some 6,000 mercenaries in Georgia, he confronted Roussel, but his Georgian troops defected due to lack of pay and he was defeated. In 1077, he is recorded as doux (military governor) of Mesopotamia. Although loyal to the Doukas dynasty and Emperor Michael VII Doukas (r. 1071–1078), he did permit his son George to join the rebellion of Nikephoros Botaneiates, who became emperor as Nikephoros III (r. 1078–1081).

In 1081, Nikephoros again remained loyal to Botaneiates when the Komnenoi under Alexios Komnenos launched their coup, even though his son George and the Doukai supported the Komnenian cause. According to Anna Komnene's Alexiad, father and son even met during the Komnenian forces' entry into Constantinople on 1 April 1081, in what Basile Skoulatos describes as one of the "most passionate" scenes of the work. Even then, Nikephoros tried to induce Botaneiates to resist, urging him to give him command of the Varangian Guard and try to defend the imperial palace, but in vain. He then tried to mediate and proposed that Alexios be adopted by Botaneiates and assume de facto control over the Empire, while the latter would retain the honorary position of emperor, but at the insistence of Caesar John Doukas, the Komnenoi rejected this proposal. Eventually, Botaneiates abdicated.

Nikephoros accepted Alexios as his new emperor, and accompanied him in his campaign in the same year against the Italo-Normans under Robert Guiscard. He fought and was killed at the Battle of Dyrrhachium against Guiscard's forces on 18 October 1081.

== Sources ==
- Kazhdan, Alexander (1991). "Palaiologos". In Kazhdan, Alexander (ed.). The Oxford Dictionary of Byzantium. Oxford and New York: Oxford University Press. pp. 1557–1560. ISBN 0-19-504652-8.
- Skoulatos, Basile (1980). Les personnages byzantins de l'Alexiade: Analyse prosopographique et synthèse [The Byzantine Personalities of the Alexiad: Prosopographical Analysis and Synthesis] (in French). Louvain-la-Neuve and Louvain: Bureau du Recueil Collège Érasme and Éditions Nauwelaerts.
- Vannier, Jean-François (1986). "Les premiers Paléologues. Étude généalogique et prosopographique" [The First Palaiologoi. Genealogical and Prosopographical Study]. In Cheynet, Jean-Claude; Vannier, Jean-François (eds.). Études Prosopographiques [Prosopographic Studies] (in French). Paris: Publications de la Sorbonne. pp. 123–186. ISBN 978-2-85944-110-4. OCLC 575241198.
