= Komnenian restoration =

Historical period of the Byzantine Empire from 1081 to 1185

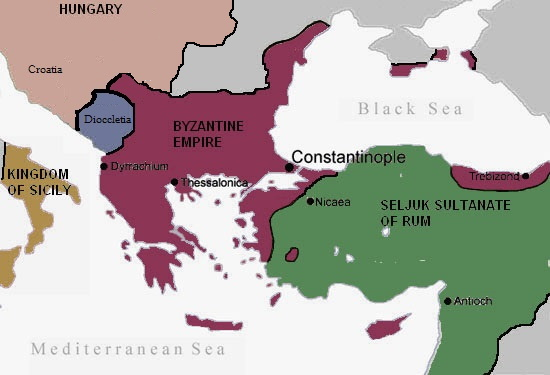
The Byzantine Empire before the First Crusade

The Komnenian restoration (1081–1185) is the term used by historians to describe the military, financial, and territorial recovery of the Byzantine Empire under the Komnenian dynasty, from the accession of Alexios I Komnenos in 1081 to the death of Andronikos I Komnenos in 1185. At the onset of the reign of Alexios I, the empire was reeling from its defeat by the Seljuk Turks at the Battle of Manzikert in 1071. The empire was also being threatened by the Normans of Robert Guiscard, who were invading the Balkans from their base in southern Italy. All this occurred as the empire's military institution was in disarray and had grown increasingly reliant on mercenaries. Previous emperors had also squandered the large gold deposits of Constantinople, so the defense of the empire had broken down, and there were few troops to fill the gaps.

The Komnenoi nevertheless managed to reassert Byzantine pre-eminence in the Mediterranean world, militarily and culturally. Relations between the Byzantine East and Western Europe flourished, epitomized by the collaboration of Alexios I and later emperors with the Crusaders (Alexios was instrumental in calling the First Crusade). The scattered and disorganized Byzantine army was restructured into a competent fighting force that became known as the Komnenian Byzantine army. Although the empire rapidly disintegrated after the death of the last Komnenos emperor, Andronikos I, in 1185, the Komnenian Restoration represented the final apex of the fifteen-hundred year history of the Roman Empire.

== Before the Komnenoi ==
In the decades before the Komnenoi, the Byzantine Empire had been on a steady decline due to many factors, the most important being the political conflict between the state bureaucracy in Constantinople and the Byzantine military aristocracy.

In almost every year since the death of Emperor Basil II, the aristocracy rose up in revolt across the empire, causing the army to move back and forth from east to west, thus exposing their borders to raiding parties of Normans, Pechenegs or Turkic horsemen. The empire's holdings in Southern Italy were finally lost to the Normans under Robert Guiscard and his son Bohemond of Taranto, who quickly plundered the weakly-held Balkan provinces of Byzantium.

In the countryside there existed a free peasantry unlike in Western Europe. However, the growing power of the aristocracy led to the dismantling of the free peasantry and the enlargement of large private estates, sometimes through purchases but often through intimidation or violence. Basil II had been ruthless in curbing the aristocracy, but after he died they only gained more power and land at the peasants' expense.

Another factor in decline was the succession crisis following the death of Basil II's brother and successor Constantine VIII. Constantine VIII had no male heirs and as a consequence, the bureaucrats of Constantinople arranged for his daughters Zoe and Theodora to marry older and incompetent men unfit for rule who were ill-advised and squandered money on trivial things.

In response to both the growing power and militancy of the aristocracy and the succession crisis, the bureaucrats in Constantinople tried to weaken the aristocracy by freeing Anatolian peasants from military service, thus turning them into a tax-paying population. Meanwhile, Byzantine frontier defenses fell into decay as successive emperors tried to save money by disbanding the large standing armies of previous eras. The bureaucrats then hired mercenaries, notably Normans, to replace the professional soldier with cheaper substitutes, usually ageing conscripts. However, the untrustworthiness, unruliness, ambitiousness, and sheer expense of these mercenary troops meant that they disrespected state authority and conducted raids within Byzantine territory, sometimes with the same Turkic raiders they were being paid by the Byzantines to fight against. These mercenary bands also took service with aristocrats who revolted against the government. And then conflict with the Armenians broke out again. Byzantine administration, economy, and military system were allowed to fall into neglect. The state leading up to 1071 was in chaos.

Following the war with the Seljuk Sultanate, in 1071 Emperor Romanos Diogenes tried to re-assert Byzantine dominance in Anatolia and recapture fortresses lost to the Seljuk Turks by treachery. He was harassed by his Armenian subjects on his expedition through central and eastern Anatolia. Learning of Byzantine advances towards Manzikert and the reneging on their peace settlement, Seljuk Sultan Alp Arslan turned his army away from attacking the Fatimid Caliphate towards the Byzantine army. The Byzantine army was internally divided between factions rival aristocrats and claimants such as Doukids to the Byzantine monarchy. These Doukids fled the area near Manzikert, leaving Emperor Romanos alone to fight Alp Arslan.

The Battle of Manzikert was not immediately decisive but subsequent events spiraled out of control and it thus constitutes a seminal moment in Byzantine history. Emperor Romanos was captured in battle and proclaimed dead by the Doukids, who returned to Constantinople with Michael VII Doukas proclaimed Emperor. Romanos was released following the payment of a ransom, but on his return journey through Anatolia was again captured, this time by the Doukids, who had him blinded; he would die from his wounds.

The reign of Michael VII was turbulent, as new civil wars ignited after the withdrawal of Byzantine forces from the frontiers. Turkic bands began to raid in increasing numbers and went ever-further going further into Eastern and then Central Anatolia, without opposition. Much of Anatolia was overrun by the Seljuk Turks who penetrated as far as the Bosporus. The Byzantine military disintegrated as defensive positions were abandoned, and territory was quickly lost to the advancing Turks. The state all but collapsed.

== Alexios I Komnenos (1081–1118) ==
The reign of Alexios is well-documented due to the survival of the Alexiad, written by his daughter Anna Komnene, which details all of the events of his reign, albeit with a bias towards Alexios. Upon ascension, Alexios inherited a much-weakened empire that was almost immediately beset by a serious invasion from the Normans of Southern Italy. The Normans used the deposition of the previous emperor Michael as the casus belli to invade the Balkans. Alexios did not have a strong enough army to successfully resist the invasion at first and suffered a grave defeat at the Battle of Dyrrachium (1081), which allowed Robert Guiscard and his son Bohemond to occupy much of the Balkans.

The Normans took Dyrrhachium in February 1082 and advanced inland, capturing most of Macedonia and Thessaly. Robert was then forced to leave Greece to deal with an attack on his ally, the Pope Gregory VII, by the Holy Roman Emperor, Henry IV. Robert left his son Bohemond in charge of the army in Greece. Bohemond was initially successful, defeating Alexios in several battles, but he was defeated by Alexios outside Larissa. Forced to retreat to Italy, Bohemond lost all the territory gained by the Normans in the campaign. This victory began the Komnenian restoration.

Shortly after the death of Robert in 1085, the Pechenegs, a nomadic group from north of the Danube, invaded the empire with a force 40,000 strong. Realizing that he would not be able to defeat the Pechenegs by conventional means, Alexios I allied with another nomadic group, the Cumans, to aid him, resulting in the annihilation of the Pecheneg horde at the Battle of Levounion on 28 April 1091.

Alexios I soon took perhaps his most important action as Emperor when he called on Pope Urban II for help in combating the Muslims of Anatolia and the Levant. Alexios particularly hoped to recover Syria and other areas that had been part of the Byzantine Empire in previous centuries. He succeeded in his attempt to rally Western European support, as a surprisingly large contingent of crusaders under Godfrey of Bouillon (among other European nobles) set off from Western Europe and journeyed through Anatolia all the way to their eventual destination of Jerusalem. While relations between crusaders and Byzantines were not always cordial, the coordination between the two armies was instrumental in capturing many important cities in Asia Minor and eventually Jerusalem itself. Between 1097 and 1101 Alexios managed to recover Nicaea, Rhodes, and Ephesus, while also making Antioch his vassal. This brought the Empire to its largest extent since before Manzikert in 1071.

In order to achieve these important military victories, however, Alexios had to resort to drastic measures in order to keep the empire financially afloat amidst so many military expeditions. He did this by melting down many Church artifacts and selling Church lands, while also utilizing conscription to keep the army well-staffed. This led to a diminution of his popularity, but he was nonetheless successful in resurrecting the Byzantine Empire by the time of his death in 1118.

== John II Komnenos (1118–1143) ==
John continued Alexios' military successes and was known throughout his reign to be a skilled and cautious commander. Though he fought a number of notable battles, his military strategy concentrated on limited offensives, aimed at creating and consolidating defensible frontiers. He methodically retook fortresses throughout Anatolia during his reign. Progress was slow and gradual, however, because the Turks in the area were strong and the Byzantine military was not yet at its former heights. Nevertheless, John made steady progress throughout his reign on the Anatolian front, eventually conquering a road to Antioch so that he could keep watch over the Crusader princes who ruled it.

On the Balkan front John achieved a crushing victory over the Pechenegs at the Battle of Beroia in 1122. His victory at Beroia was so decisive that afterwards the Pechenegs ceased to be an independent people and disappeared from most historical records. Due to his continuous military successes the Byzantine empire was kept safe and its realms were free from destruction and allowed to grow and prosper. His victory over the Hungarians at the Battle of Haram (1128), and a subsequent campaign, resulted in increased political stability in the Balkans and continued Byzantine suzerainty over the Serbian principalities.

During this time John also reorganized the Byzantine army, making it into a professional fighting force, and not the hodge podge of local forces it had been previously. He created permanent, fortified military camps in both Anatolia and the Balkans, where his field armies could be concentrated and trained, and added a large cavalry component to the army (most famously the Kataphraktoi of Macedonia) which allowed the Byzantines to effectively fight the more mobile Turks. Yet John died suddenly in 1143, possibly from an accidental hand wound from a poisoned arrow sustained while hunting. His sudden death kept the Byzantines from continuing their conquests of Anatolia, and historian Zoe Oldenbourg believes that, if John had lived but a few more years, much larger territorial gains would have been made by the Byzantines.

== Manuel I Komnenos (1143–1180) ==
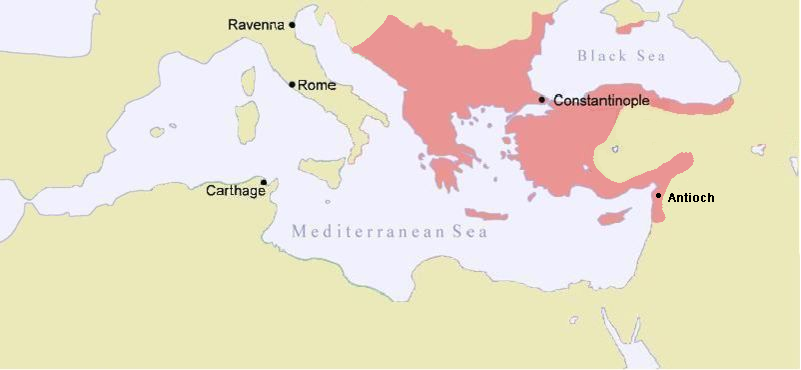
The Byzantine empire under Manuel I Komnenos, c. 1170. By this stage, much of Asia Minor and a large section of the Balkans had been recovered.

Though Manuel was the youngest of John's four sons he was chosen to succeed his father due to his ability to listen to advice and learn from his mistakes (or so his father discerned). He continued the Komnenian restoration admirably, particularly in the Balkans where he consolidated Byzantine holdings and inflicted a crushing defeat on the Kingdom of Hungary in 1167 at the Battle of Sirmium. With this victory the Kingdom of Hungary was made a vassal of the Empire and, according to noted Byzantine historian Paul Magdalino, Byzantine control over the Balkans was at its most effective point since Late Antiquity.

Additionally Manuel opened up relations with the Western kingdoms, having grown to appreciate their various cultures, and even organized regular jousting competitions. Because of this fondness, he increased diplomatic ties to the West, arranging alliances with the Pope and the Crusaders of the Outremer and successfully dealt with the troublesome Second Crusade that passed through his lands. Conversely, Western Europeans held him in great esteem, and he was described by the Latin historian William of Tyre as "beloved of God...a great-souled man of incomparable energy," highlighting the goodwill he garnered with the previously hostile Western European powers. Indeed, of all the Byzantine emperors it is said that Manuel was the closest to healing the centuries-old rift between the Christian Churches of the East and West, though he never fully achieved this goal.

But in Anatolia, Manuel's successes were more suspect, and his reign is highlighted by his defeat at the Battle of Myriokephalon in 1176 at the hands of the Seljuks. Historians have long debated the importance of this defeat, with some calling it an unmitigated disaster while others say that the emperor emerged from it with most of his army intact. All agree though that the era of Komnenian invincibility ended with this battle, and the empire never again took the offensive in Anatolia, a premonition for the coming weakness of the empire. Regardless of the true story, it is clear that after Myriokephalon Byzantine advances in Anatolia were forever halted and all they could do was merely maintain the status quo afterwards.

Yet the losses were quickly made good, and in the following year Manuel's forces inflicted a defeat upon a force of "picked Turks". The Byzantine commander John Vatatzes, who destroyed the Turkish invaders at the Battle of Hyelion and Leimocheir, not only brought troops from the capital but also was able to gather an army along the way; a sign that the Byzantine army remained strong.

== Andronikos I and the end of the Komnenian Restoration ==
With Manuel's death in 1180 the Byzantine empire was once again plunged into a succession crisis because his son Alexios II Komnenos was still a minor. Empress Maria ruled the empire as regent, but she was quickly deposed by a series of revolts, and in her place Andronikos I became emperor. Andronikos was known for his incredible cruelty; he often utilized great acts of violence to get others to follow his orders, engendering little sympathy from the common people. Though Andronikos worked tirelessly to root out corruption in the Empire, his heavy-handed tactics against the aristocracy naturally led to dissent, and he was eventually overthrown in 1185.

Of equal importance was his failure to prevent the Massacre of the Latins in Constantinople in 1182 when tens of thousands of Western European traders were massacred by mobs in a xenophobic fervor. This contributed to the disunity between the East and the West that culminated in the sack of Constantinople by the members of the Fourth Crusade in 1204.

The death of Andronikos ended the century-long revival of the Komnenoi, and the Empire descended into civil war as the aristocracy and military elite grappled for control. This led to military weakness, allowing the Turks to regain much Byzantine territory in Anatolia. Within two decades Constantinople would, for the first time in its thousand-year history as capital of the Byzantine Empire, be conquered by a foreign power. The decline of the Empire began almost immediately, for without the strong Komnenoi emperors, the previous financial and military problems of the Empire became clear and unstoppable.

== Bibliography ==
- Norwich, John Julius (1997). A Short History of Byzantium. Viking. ISBN 0-679-77269-3
- Angold, Michael (1997). The Byzantine Empire, 1025–1204: A Political History. Longman. ISBN 0-582-29468-1
- Haldon, John (2001). The Byzantine Wars. Tempus. ISBN 0-7524-1777-0
