= Constantine Dalassenos (thalassokrator) =

Byzantine military leader

- Military career
- Allegiance: Byzantine Empire
- Rank: doux of the fleet, thalassokrator
- Conflicts: Byzantine–Seljuk Wars, Battle of Levounion

Constantine Dalassenos (Greek: Κωνσταντίνος Δαλασσηνός, fl. ca. 1086–1093) was a prominent Byzantine military leader on land and sea during the early reign of Emperor Alexios I Komnenos (r. 1081–1118), especially in the campaigns against Tzachas of Smyrna. His life is only known from the Alexiad of Anna Komnene.

== Biography ==
According to the Alexiad, Constantine Dalassenos was related to Alexios I through his mother, Anna Dalassene, although the exact connection is unknown. He first appears in 1086/7, when he was sent as an envoy to receive Sinope and the surrounding towns from a Turkish chiaus who had turned renegade, had become baptized and collaborated with the Byzantines. Dalassenos became Sinope's governor, while the chiaus was made doux of Anchialus.

In spring 1090, Dalassenos was raised to the post of "doux of the fleet" and given command of the Byzantine naval forces against the emir Tzachas of Smyrna. Tzachas, formerly a Byzantine vassal, had built a fleet of his own, had seized several Aegean islands, and raided others. After taking Lesbos (except for the fortress of Methymna) and Chios, he defeated a Byzantine fleet under Niketas Kastamonites. Taking advantage of Tzachas's absence in Smyrna, Dalassenos disembarked his troops on Chios and immediately assailed the island's fortified capital. Although the Byzantines seized the town's harbour, they failed to break through into the city itself. Meanwhile, Tzachas had gathered 8,000 men, according to the Alexiad, and set off to the island's relief. His army marched on land up to the shore opposite the island, while his fleet followed, sailing along the shore. Dalassenos had charged Constantine Opos with hindering the Turks from crossing over, but when the Turks did so under the cover of night, the latter refused to engage them when he saw that Tzachas had had his ships chained together. The two armies engaged in skirmishes, but soon negotiations began. Dalassenos deferred any decision; and when Tzachas returned to Smyrna, perhaps to gather more forces, he gathered his men, prepared more siege engines and took the citadel of Chios in a surprise attack.

In 1091, Dalassenos is recorded as participating in Alexios I's campaign against the Pechenegs in the Balkans. In the decisive Battle of Levounion on 29 April 1091, he commanded the army's left wing.

In 1092, he was again sent against Tzachas, with the title of thalassokrator (θαλασσοκράτωρ, "master of the sea"), subordinated to the new megas doux, John Doukas. The two commanders were to attack Mytilene on Lesbos, still held by Tzachas. Doukas, at the head of the land forces, arrived first, and attacked the town. The siege lasted for three months, before Tzachas offered to surrender the town in exchange for safe passage back to Smyrna. Doukas agreed, but Dalassenos, who had just arrived, attacked the Turkish fleet. He captured many of the Turkish vessels, and ordered the crews, including the rowers, executed.

Dalassenos then returned to Constantinople. In spring 1093, when Tzachas attacked the port of Abydos in the Sea of Marmara, Alexios again dispatched him against the emir by sea. At the same time, however, Alexios called upon the Sultan of the Seljuk Sultanate of Rum Kilij Arslan I (r. 1092–1107) to attack Tzachas from the rear. The Sultan complied, and in an audience had Tzachas murdered. Nothing further is known of Dalassenos after this.

== Sources ==
- Dawes, Elizabeth A., ed. (1928). The Alexiad. London: Routledge & Kegan Paul. Archived from the original on 2014-08-14.
- Skoulatos, Basile (1980). Les personnages byzantins de l'Alexiade: Analyse prosopographique et synthèse [The Byzantine Personalities of the Alexiad: Prosopographical Analysis and Synthesis] (in French). Louvain-la-Neuve and Louvain: Bureau du Recueil Collège Érasme and Éditions Nauwelaerts.
