= Nikephoros Katakalon =

12th-century Byzantine aristocrat

Nikephoros Euphorbenos Katakalon (Greek: Νικηφόρος Εὐφορβηνός Κατακαλών) was a Byzantine aristocrat and son-in-law of Emperor Alexios I Komnenos (r. 1081–1118).

He was the son of the distinguished general Constantine Euphorbenos Katakalon, one of Alexios' most trusted officials. As a token of Alexios' appreciation for Constantine, Nikephoros was married to the porphyrogennete Maria, the emperor's second daughter, and raised to the rank of panhypersebastos. From the Alexiad, he is known to have participated in combat against the Cumans in 1095, alongside his father, where he distinguished himself by his bravery. It is unknown when he died, but he is recorded as being dead by 1130.

With Maria, he had numerous children, but only two sons, Alexios Komnenos and Andronikos, are known by name, having held senior positions later in the century. Another son, John, is known only by his commemoration in the typikon of the Monastery of Christ Philanthropos. The couple also had an unknown number of daughters (at least three according to Varzos), as their existence is mentioned in the typikon of the Kecharitomene Monastery.

== Sources ==
- Kazhdan, Alexander, ed. (1991). The Oxford Dictionary of Byzantium. Oxford and New York: Oxford University Press. ISBN 0-19-504652-8.
- Kouroupou, Matoula; Vannier, Jean-François (2005). "Commémoraisons des Comnènes dans le typikon liturgique du monastère du Christ Philanthrope (ms. Panaghia Kamariotissa 29)" [Commemorations of the Komnenoi in the liturgical typikon of the Monastery of Christ Philanthropos (ms. Panaghia Kamariotissa 29)]. Revue des études byzantines (in French). 63: 41–69. doi:10.3406/rebyz.2005.2305.
- Skoulatos, Basile (1980). Les personnages byzantins de l'Alexiade: Analyse prosopographique et synthèse [The Byzantine Personalities of the Alexiad: Prosopographical Analysis and Synthesis] (in French). Louvain-la-Neuve and Louvain: Bureau du Recueil Collège Érasme and Éditions Nauwelaerts. OCLC 8468871.
