= John Komnenos (parakoimomenos) =

John Komnenos (Greek: Ἰωάννης Κομνηνός, romanized: Iōannēs Komnēnos; c. 1070 – after 1118) was a Byzantine aristocrat and official.

== Life ==
Born c. 1070, he was the only known child of the Caesar Nikephoros Melissenos and his wife Eudokia Komnene, the older sister of the Byzantine emperor Alexios I Komnenos (r. 1081–1118).

His life is relatively obscure. He married around 1090, but neither the name, nor the origin or any other details about his wife are known. When Nikephoros Melissenos died in 1104, John inherited his father's large estates around Thessalonica, but it is unknown whether he also inherited the governance over the city, as his father before him. Otherwise his life during the reign of Alexios I is unknown.

When Alexios I died in 1118, he evidently supported the succession of his oldest son John II Komnenos (r. 1118–1143) against the claims of his sister Anna Komnene. As a result, when John II was crowned emperor, John was promoted to parakoimomenos and appointed joint head of the administration along with his cousin the protovestiarios Gregory Taronites. However, according to Niketas Choniates, once in office, John "administered his office without restraint, behaving pompously and with singular presumptuousness", and was quickly dismissed. He is no longer mentioned in the sources thereafter.

== Offspring and descendants ==
Information about his children survives only in much later sources: Gennadios Scholarios in the 15th century reports that he had two sons, Nikephoros and Alexios Komnenos Melissenos, while only the latter is mentioned by the 16th-century scholar Pseudo-Sphrantzes. According to Scholarios, Nikephoros was sent to suppress an anti-Byzantine revolt in Naples led by a certain Roger Nabardos, but failed and for fear of punishment stayed there. Scholarios maintains that he married Roger's sister and became the progenitor of two families, the Komnenatoi and Melissoi, but as Konstantinos Varzos points out, no information about these families survives. Alexios on the other hand may have served as megas doux of the Byzantine navy, and married a lady, who according to Pseudo-Sphrantzes was a member of the Strategopoulos family. Pseudo-Sphrantzes and Scholarios give different accounts on the number and names of Alexios' sons: according to the former, he had only one son, named Theodosios, the father of the Caesar Alexios Strategopoulos and of Michael Strategopoulos; the latter gives three sons, Theophylact, Michael, and Nicholas, of whom Theophylact was Theodosios' father and grandfather of the Caesar.

== Sources ==
- Guilland, Rodolphe (1967). "Le Parakimomène". Recherches sur les institutions byzantines, Tome I (in French). Berlin: Akademie-Verlag. pp. 202–215.
- Magoulias, Harry J., ed. (1984). O City of Byzantium: Annals of Niketas Choniatēs. Detroit: Wayne State University Press. ISBN 978-0-8143-1764-8.
- Varzos, Konstantinos (1984). Η Γενεαλογία των Κομνηνών [The Genealogy of the Komnenoi] (PDF) (in Greek). Vol. A1. Thessaloniki: Centre for Byzantine Studies, University of Thessaloniki.
