= Kourtikios =

Kourtikios (Greek: Κουρτίκιος) or Kourtikes (Κουρτίκης) was the name of a Byzantine aristocratic family of Armenian origin.

The family's eponymous founder, K'urdik, was an Armenian nobleman who went over to the Byzantine Empire and surrendered his domain, the town of Lokana, to Emperor Basil I the Macedonian (r. 867–886), settling with his family in Byzantine territory. His descendants counted among the senior members of the military aristocracy in the next two centuries. Several members supported the rebellions of various military aristocrats from Constantine Doukas (Kourtikios the Armenian) to Bardas Skleros (Michael Kourtikios), and in the 11th century, they intermarried with the leading aristocratic families of the time, including the imperial dynasties of the Komnenoi and the Doukai. The family's fortunes declined abruptly in the 12th century, when a single member is known, occupying a modest provincial post. At the same time, a branch of the family became active in Armenian Cilicia. The family produced a few senior officials under the Empire of Nicaea, but declined again in the Palaiologan period.

== Sources ==
- Kazhdan, Alexander (1991). "Kourtikios". In Kazhdan, Alexander (ed.). The Oxford Dictionary of Byzantium. Oxford and New York: Oxford University Press. pp. 1157–1158. ISBN 0-19-504652-8.
- Whittow, Mark (1996). The Making of Byzantium, 600–1025. Berkeley and Los Angeles, California: University of California Press. ISBN 978-0-520-20496-6.
