= Sebastos =

Ancient Greek and Byzantine honorific title

Sebastos (Ancient Greek: σεβαστός lit. 'venerable one, augustus', [sevasˈtos]) (Note: plural: σεβαστοί, sebastoí, [sevasˈti]) was an honorific used by the ancient Greeks to render the Roman imperial title of Augustus. The female form of the title was sebaste (σεβαστή). It was revived as an honorific in the 11th century Byzantine Empire and came to form the basis of a new system of court titles. From the Komnenian period onwards, the Byzantine hierarchy included the title sebastos and variants derived from it, like sebastokrator, protosebastos, panhypersebastos, and sebastohypertatos.

== History ==
The term appears in the Hellenistic East as an honorific for the Roman emperors from the 1st century onwards, being a translation of the Latin Augustus. For example, the Temple of the Sebastoi in Ephesus is dedicated to the Flavian dynasty. This association also was carried over to the naming of cities in honor of the Roman emperors, such as Sebaste, Sebasteia and Sebastopolis.

The epithet was revived in the mid-11th century – in the feminine form sebaste – by Emperor Constantine IX Monomachos (r. 1042–1055) for his mistress Maria Skleraina, to whom he accorded quasi-imperial honours. A number of individuals were qualified as sebastoi thereafter, such as Constantine Keroularios, or Isaac Komnenos and his brother, the future emperor Alexios I Komnenos (r. 1081–1118).

=== Under the Komnenian emperors ===
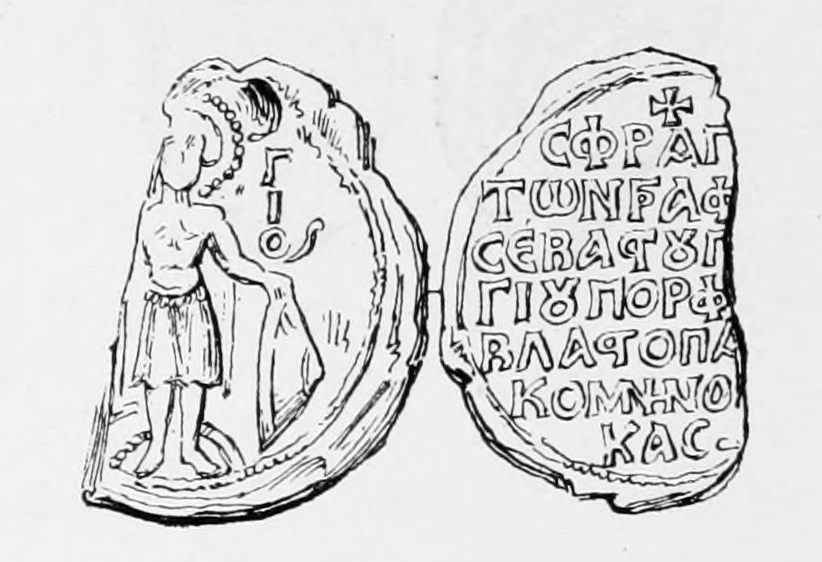
Seal of sebastos George Palaiologos, 12th century

When the latter assumed the Byzantine throne in 1081, he set about to reorganize the old system of court dignities, with sebastos as the basis for a new set of titles – sebastokrator, sebastos and protosebastos, panhypersebastos, sebastohypertatos and protosebastohypertatos – which primarily signalled the closeness of their holders' familial relationship to the emperor, either by blood or by marriage. This process profoundly transformed the very nature of Byzantine aristocracy, with the imposition of an entire class of imperial relatives and associates superimposed on the "traditional" administrative system and the higher officialdom that constituted the Senate. In the words of historian Paul Magdalino, this move further isolated the imperial family from the common people and made them "partners in, rather than executives of, imperial authority". In this context, the scholar L. Stiernon calculated that in the period from the late 11th to the end of the 12th century, 30% of all sebastoi belonged to the ruling Komnenos family, 20% to the closely allied Doukas clan, and another 40% to other families of the high aristocracy who intermarried with the Komnenoi, the remaining 10% encompassing both Byzantines as well as foreigners who either intermarried with the imperial family or received the title as an honorific distinction.

Initially, the sebastoi formed the basis of this new familial aristocracy, with sons of a sebastokrator, a panhypersebastos, or a sebastos being sebastoi themselves; due to the proliferation of the title, however, under Manuel I Komnenos (r. 1143–1180) a new class of dignitaries was created for the emperor's nephews and cousins, i.e., the sons of higher dignitaries; and the sebastoi were relegated to a grade below them, above the nobelissimoi. The sebastoi were further divided in two groups: the simple sebastoi and the sebastoi gambroi. The latter were members of various aristocratic families tied to the emperor via marriage to his female relatives (gambros means "son-in-law" in Greek). The sebastoi gambroi thus formed the upper layer of the sebastoi class, but should not be confused with the imperial gambroi, the actual sons-in-law of the emperor, who were even higher in the hierarchy, ranking above the cousins and nephews and just below the sebastokratores. The forms pansebastos ("venerable by all"), and pansebastos sebastos are also found in seals, inscriptions, and correspondence of the period, but they are merely rhetorical augmentations of the original title sebastos, and do not, as was believed by earlier scholars like Gustave Schlumberger, represent distinct and superior ranks. It is notable that among Byzantine sebastoi, their precedence was not determined by the offices they might bear, but by the degree of their kinship to the emperor.

=== Later usage ===
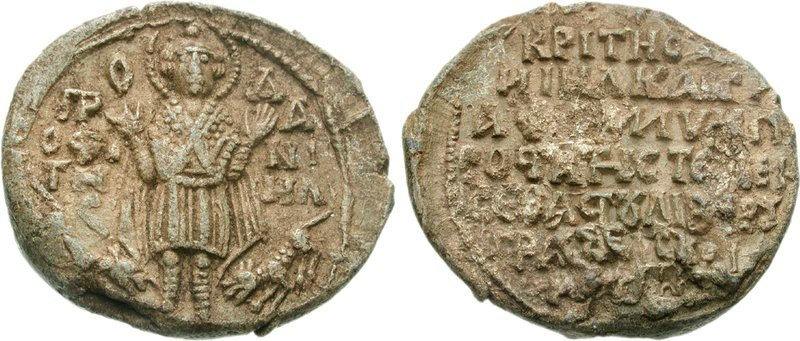
Seal of the sebastos and krites Liberos, 13th–14th century

The title was also conferred to foreign rulers, and spread to neighboring, Byzantine-influenced states, like Bulgaria, where a sebastos was the head of an administrative district, and Serbia, where the title was employed for various officials.

In Byzantium itself, the title lost its pre-eminence in the late 12th century, and in the following centuries, the sebastos was a title reserved for commanders of ethnic units. By the time pseudo-Kodinos wrote his Book of Offices, shortly after the middle of the 14th century, the sebastos occupied one of the lowest rungs in the imperial hierarchy, coming 78th between the droungarios and the myrtaïtes. His court dress was a white skiadion hat with embroideries, a long kabbadion of "commonly used silk", and a skaranikon hat covered in red velvet and topped by a small red tassel. He bore no staff of office. Earlier lists of offices, such as the appendix to the Hexabiblos, give slightly different ranks, placing him above the governor (prokathemenos) of a fortress and of the droungarios, and after the megas myrtaïtes.

== Bibliography ==
- Kazhdan, Alexander, ed. (1991). The Oxford Dictionary of Byzantium. Oxford and New York: Oxford University Press. ISBN 0-19-504652-8.
- Magdalino, Paul (2002) [1993]. The Empire of Manuel I Komnenos, 1143–1180. Cambridge, United Kingdom: Cambridge University Press. ISBN 0-521-52653-1.
- Stiernon, Lucien (1965). "Notes de titulature et de prosopographie byzantines - Sébaste et gambros". Revue des études byzantines. 23: 222–243. doi:10.3406/rebyz.1965.1349.
- Verpeaux, Jean, ed. (1966). Pseudo-Kodinos, Traité des Offices (in French). Paris: Centre National de la Recherche Scientifique.
