= Battle of Dristra =

1087 battle involving the Byzantine Empire

The Battle of Dristra/Dorostolon was fought in August 1087 between the forces of the Byzantine Empire, led by Emperor Alexios I Komnenos, and the Pechenegs who had settled in the former Byzantine province of Paradounabon, in what is now northern Bulgaria.

After rejecting peace overtures from the Pechenegs, Alexios left Constantinople, crossed the Balkan Mountains, and reached the city of Dorostolon (modern Silistra), the capital of Paradounabon. After a brief siege, the city was taken, but the citadels continued to resist. fearing the imminent arrival of the main Pecheneg army, Alexios decided to withdraw, but the Pecheneg army caught up with the Byzantines. The ensuing battle was hard-fought and with heavy casualties on both sides. The battle hung in the balance until the arrival of more Pecheneg reinforcements to the battlefield, which caused a panic in the Byzantine ranks. Alexios tried to rally his men by personal example, but the morale and discipline of his army collapsed, and the Byzantine troops broke and fled, forcing their emperor to join them.

Although the Pechenegs were soon after attacked in their rear by the Cumans, their victory at Dorsotolon opened up the Empire's Balkan provinces to Pecheneg raids. The Pechenegs and Byzantines waged several campaigns over the following years, until the decisive Byzantine victory at the Battle of Levounion in 1091, which ended the Pecheneg threat to the Empire.

== Bibliography ==
- Birkenmeier, John W. (2002). The Development of the Komnenian Army: 1081–1180. Brill. ISBN 90-04-11710-5.
- Meško, Marek (2023). Alexios I Komnenos in the Balkans, 1081–1095. Palgrave Macmillan. ISBN 9783031262968.
- Neville, Leonora (2010). "Dristra, Battle of". In Rogers, Clifford J. (ed.). The Oxford Encyclopedia of Medieval Warfare and Military Technology. Oxford University Press. p. 549. ISBN 978-0-19-533403-6.
