= Battle of Levounion =

1091 battle of the Komnenian Restoration

- Part of the Komnenian restoration
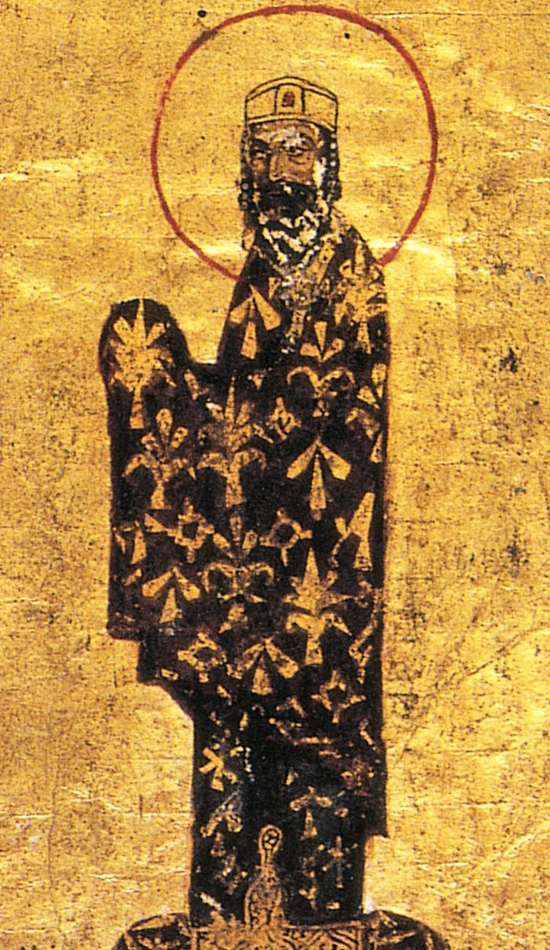
- Painting of Alexios I, from a Greek manuscript in the Vatican library
Date	April 29, 1091
Location	Levounion (near Enos, modern European Turkey)
Result	Byzantine victory

Belligerents
Byzantines, including Vlach, Bulgarian, Frankish and Flemish contingents Cumans	Pechenegs

Commanders and leaders
Alexios I Komnenos; George Palaiologos; Constantine Dalassenos Tougorkan Khan	Unknown

Strength
13,000 Byzantines: 5,000 Vlachs; 500 Latin Knights; 10,000–20,000 Cumans; or 40,000 Cumans	30,000–40,000 Pechenegs; or 600,000 Pechenegs

Casualties and losses
Unknown	Unknown, but thought to be heavy

The Battle of Levounion was the first decisive Byzantine victory of the Komnenian restoration. On 29 April 1091, an invading force of Pechenegs was crushed by the combined forces of the Byzantine Empire under Alexios I Komnenos and his Cuman allies.

== Background ==
On August 26, 1071, a Byzantine army under Romanos IV Diogenes was defeated by the Seljuk Turks at Manzikert in eastern Asia Minor. The defeat caused the emperor to be deposed and replaced by the ineffectual Michael VII Doukas, who refused to honour the treaty that had been signed by Romanos. In response, the Turks began to move into Anatolia in 1073, meeting no opposition. Chaos reigned as the empire's resources were squandered in a series of disastrous civil wars. Thousands of Turkoman tribesmen crossed the unguarded frontier and moved into Anatolia. By 1080, an area of 78,000 square kilometres (30,000 sq mi) had been lost by the empire. It is almost impossible to overestimate the significance of these events, as within less than a decade more than half of the manpower of the empire had been lost, along with much of its grain supply. Thus, the Battle of Manzikert resulted in the greatest blow to the Empire in its 700 years of history.

It is against this backdrop of defeat and disaster that Alexios Komnenos, a successful young general and nephew of Isaac I Komnenos, who had been fighting against the Turks since the age of fourteen, ascended the throne on Easter Sunday, April 4, 1081. According to John Julius Norwich, the significance of Alexios's rise to power was that "...for the first time in over half a century the empire was in capable hands." Alexios determined to restore the fortunes of the Byzantine Empire, whatever the cost. Around 1090 or 1091, Emir Chaka of Smyrna suggested an alliance with the Pechenegs in order to completely destroy the Byzantine Empire.

== Pechenegs invade ==
In the spring of 1087, news reached the Byzantine court of a huge invasion from the north. The invaders were Pechenegs from the north-west Black Sea region; it was reported that they numbered 40,000 men in all. Taking advantage of the precarious situation of the Byzantines, the Pecheneg horde headed towards the Byzantine capital at Constantinople, plundering the northern Balkans as they went. The invasion posed a serious threat to Alexios's empire, yet due to years of civil war and neglect the Byzantine military was unable to provide the emperor with enough troops to repel the Pecheneg invaders. Alexios was forced to rely on his own ingenuity and diplomatic skill to save his empire from annihilation. He appealed to another Turkic nomadic tribe, the Cumans, to join him in battle against the Pechenegs.

== Battle ==
Won over by Alexios's offer of gold in return for aid against the Pechenegs, the Cumans hurried to join Alexios and his army. In the late spring of 1091, the Cuman forces arrived in Byzantine territory, and the combined army prepared to advance against the Pechenegs. On Monday, 28 April 1091, Alexios and his allies reached the Pecheneg camp at Levounion near the Hebros River.

Alexios had doubts about the loyalty of the Cumans before and during the battle, fearing that they might make common cause with the Pechenegs. In the event, the Cumans remained faithful to their promises.

The Emperor stationed himself in the centre of his army, with his infantry. George Palaiologos commanded the right wing, Constantine Dalassenos the left wing. The main body of the Byzantines had infantry in the centre and cavalry on both wings. The position of the Cumans is unclear, but they were flanked by two other Byzantine formations. To their right was a force commanded by Monastras, to their left was a unit commanded by Ouzas. On the western flank Constantine Humbertopoulos commanded the Western (Latin) knights.

The Pechenegs appear to have been caught by surprise, they were almost certainly outnumbered by the combined imperial and Cuman army. The battle that took place on the next morning at Levounion was practically a massacre. The Pecheneg warriors had brought their women and children with them, kept in their defensive wagon laager. The cavalry wings of the combined army advanced at a higher speed than the infantry centre, this created an encirclement of the Pechenegs, which contributed greatly to the high casualties that the Pechenegs suffered. The Pechenegs defence quickly collapsed, with the Cumans and the Byzantines falling upon the enemy camp, slaughtering many. Anna Comnena wrote that the soldiers of the victorious army became weary of making continual sword blows. The survivors were captured by the Byzantines, the men of fighting age taken into imperial service, and settled in depopulated areas of the Empire. The battle gave rise to a Byzantine saying, "All because of one day the Scyths [Pechenegs] never saw May."

== Significance ==
Levounion was the most decisive victory achieved by a Byzantine army for more than half a century. The battle marks a turning point in Byzantine history; the empire had reached the nadir of its fortunes in the last twenty years, and Levounion indicated that the empire was on the road to recovery. The Pechenegs had been neutralised as a threat for a generation, and the empire's European possessions were now more secure.

In the years ahead, Byzantium would go on to stage a steady recovery under Alexios and his descendants, the dynasty of the Komnenoi. Byzantine armies returned to Asia Minor, and, in the wake of the First Crusade reconquered much of the lost territory there including the fertile coastal regions, along with many of the most important cities. With the restoration of firm central government, the empire became rich during the course of the next century, and Constantinople once more became the metropolis of the Christian world. Thus, the battle at Levounion in 1091 marked the beginning of a resurgence of Byzantine power and influence that would last for a hundred years, until the demise of the Komnenian dynasty at the close of the 12th century.

== Sources ==
- Angold, M. (1984) The Byzantine Empire, 1025–1204: A Political History, Longman, Harlow ISBN 978-0-58-249060-4
- Birkenmeier, John W. (2002). The Development of the Komnenian Army: 1081–1180. Brill, Leiden. ISBN 90-04-11710-5.
- Comnena, Anna (1969) [c. 1148], The Alexiad, translated by Sewter, E. R. A., Penguin Classics, ISBN 9780141904542
- Haldon, John (2001), The Byzantine Wars, Tempus, ISBN 0-7524-1777-0
- Meško, Marek (2023). Alexios I Komnenos in the Balkans, 1081–1095. Germany: Springer International Publishing. ISBN 9783031262968
- Treadgold, Warren (1997). A History of the Byzantine State and Society. Stanford University Press. pp. 612–29. ISBN 978-0-8047-2630-6.

== See also ==
Byzantine army (Komnenian era)
