= Isaac Komnenos (brother of Alexios I) =

- Sebastokrator
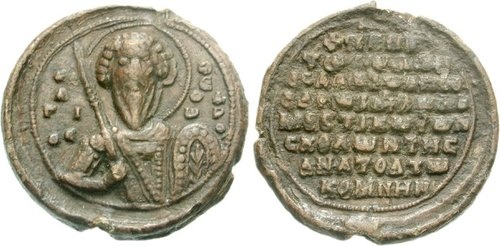
- Seal of Isaac as protoproedros and domestikos ton scholon of the East in c. 1073, showing the military saint St. Theodore

Sebastokrator of the Byzantine Empire
- Tenure: c. April 1081 – 1102/4
- Successor: Andronikos Komnenos
- Emperor: Alexios I Komnenos

Sebastos
- In office 1078–1081
- Monarch: Nikephoros III Botaneiates

Protoproedros
- Doux of Antioch; 1074–1078
- Domestic of the Schools of the East c. 1073–c. 1074
- Monarch: Michael VII Doukas
- Born: c. 1050; Constantinople (modern-day Istanbul, Turkey)
- Died: 1102/1104; Constantinople
- Spouse: Irene of Alania
- Issue: John, Alexios, Constantine, Adrianos, Sophia, unknown daughter
- House: Komnenos
- Father: John Komnenos
- Mother: Anna Dalassene
- Religion: Eastern Orthodox Church

Isaac Komnenos or Comnenus (Greek: Ἰσαάκιος Κομνηνός, Isaakios Komnēnos; c. 1050 – 1102/1104) was a notable Byzantine aristocrat and military commander in the 1070s. Isaac played a major role in the rise to the throne of his younger brother, the Byzantine Emperor Alexios I Komnenos (r. 1081–1118), and remained a leading figure in his brother's administration until his death.

Isaac was born to the highest aristocracy of mid-11th century Byzantium, a position reinforced through marriage ties to the imperial Doukas dynasty. Well educated and brave, in 1073–1078 Isaac occupied two of the highest military positions in the Byzantine Empire, as Domestic of the Schools and doux of Antioch. His military record against the Seljuk Turks was not particularly distinguished, but on his return to Constantinople in 1078 he gained the favour of Emperor Nikephoros III Botaneiates, and of Empress Maria of Alania. Isaac and Alexios used imperial favour to further their own designs on the throne, launching a revolt in early 1081 that saw Alexios crowned emperor. As a reward, Alexios created the title of sebastokrator for Isaac, which put him almost on par with the emperor. During Alexios' reign and until his death, Isaac played an important role in domestic affairs in matters of public order and justice, being called to examine several cases of conspiracy or heretical teachings.

== Early life and career ==
Isaac was the second-eldest son and third child of the domestikos ton scholon John Komnenos, and his wife Anna Dalassene. The exact date of his birth is unknown, but was likely around 1050. According to his niece, the historian-princess Anna Komnene (Alexiad, 77–78), he was physically similar to his younger brother, the future emperor Alexios, though he was paler and his beard was less bushy. According to Anna, he enjoyed hunting and war, where he would put himself in the vanguard during battle. Anna and other contemporaries, like Theophylact of Ohrid, underline Isaac's virtue and his capability of befriending people, although Anna also mentions that he was often short-tempered, and that he could suddenly explode on account of a single word. According to all sources, Isaac was extremely well educated; the Patriarch of Antioch, John the Oxite, records that he was competent in the interpretation of scripture, while Basil of Euchaita credits him with an extensive knowledge of philosophical matters. Only a handful of his writings survive: three treatises on philosophy, directed against the Neoplatonist philosopher Proclus, and a theological compilation against Leo of Chalcedon.

As a result of his parentage, he belonged to the highest aristocracy of mid-11th century Byzantium, being the nephew of Emperor Isaac I Komnenos (r. 1057–1059). Following the trial and exile of his mother in late 1071 or early 1072, he was exiled to the island of Prinkipo alongside her. In order to reconcile the powerful Komnenos clan to himself, the Emperor Michael VII Doukas (r. 1071–1078) soon recalled him and married him (sometime after 4 August 1072) to Irene, a Georgian princess, who was first cousin to Michael's wife, Maria of Alania. According to Cyril Toumanoff, Irene was the daughter of the Georgian prince Demetrius and was formerly the mistress of the Byzantine Emperor Constantine IX.

Shortly after, probably in 1073, he was appointed as domestikos ton scholon of the East, (Note: Anna Komnene claims that he also commanded the western, or European, troops.) and sent as commander-in-chief (strategos autokrator) to campaign in Anatolia against the Seljuk Turks, who had invaded the area following the Battle of Manzikert in 1071. At the first battle, near Caesarea, he was captured by the Turks, and was released only after a ransom was paid. He then returned to Constantinople, via Ancyra, with his younger brother Alexios. In the next year, he was sent east again, this time as doux of Antioch. His predecessor, Joseph Tarchaneiotes, had died, and his son Katakalon, was unable to control the unrest sweeping the city, orchestrated by the Patriarch of Antioch Aemilian, suspected of collusion with the Armenian warlord Philaretos Brachamios, who in the aftermath of Manzikert had established a semi-independent domain in the Taurus Mountains north of the city. Isaac used a ruse to remove the patriarch from the city, but his partisans rose in revolt, and had to be suppressed by force. While confronting a Turkish raid in the spring of 1075, he was again captured by the Turks, and had to be ransomed by the citizens of Antioch for 20,000 gold pieces. The same battle saw the death of his brother-in-law Constantine Diogenes, son of Romanos IV Diogenes (r. 1068–1071). Isaac remained in Antioch until the first half of 1078, when he returned to Constantinople.

== Plotting the coup d'état ==
Once back in the capital, he quickly gained the favour of the new emperor, the elderly Nikephoros III Botaneiates (r. 1078–1081), reportedly due to the latter's fondness for Syrian textiles, which Isaac often gave him as gifts. Accordingly, Botaneiates often called Isaac to dine at his table, gave him the high title of sebastos and the right to reside in the imperial palace. Despite the favour shown to them by Botaneiates, Isaac and Alexios plotted to advance the position of the Komnenos clan by deposing the emperor and seizing the throne. When Botaneiates' Bulgarian confidantes, Boril and Germanos, learned of their intentions, the brothers sought the protection of Empress Maria, who adopted Alexios. The empress feared for status of her son by Michael VII, Constantine Doukas, whom Botaneiates intended to sideline in favour of a certain Synadenos. According to Anna Komnene, the brothers used the opportunity to reveal their plans to the empress, pledging to safeguard Constantine's rights to the succession. Thus, and through Alexios' marriage to Irene Doukaina, the Komnenos brothers secured the support of the still powerful Doukas family.

The brothers found an opportune moment in late January 1081, when the sack of Cyzicus by the Seljuks led to a concentration of troops in Thrace, close to the capital. On Sunday, 14 February, the brothers and their partisans met, and on the next day they secretly left Constantinople and made for Adrianople, and then Tzouroulos, where they joined the army. Gaining control over it, they moved it towards Constantinople, setting up camp at the suburb of Skiza. At Skiza, there was contention that Isaac could be proclaimed emperor instead of Alexios, who according to one anonymous chronicle had already been crowned emperor at Adrianople, but the Doukai and the bulk of the army threw their support behind the latter, and Isaac acquiesced. He even demonstratively clasped the imperial purple boots on his brother's feet. The Komnenoi entered Constantinople on 1 April, and Isaac with the rest of the family established themselves in the palace.

== Career under Alexios I ==
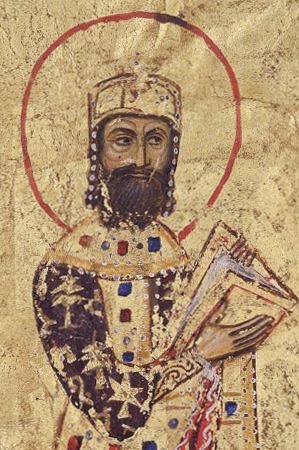
Portrait of Emperor Alexios I Komnenos, from a 12th-century Greek manuscript

After Alexios gained power, Isaac proved one of his most loyal, steadfast and enthusiastic supporters. Alexios in turn rewarded him by awarding him with the new title of sebastokrator which marked him as a near-equal; in the words of Anna Komnene, an "emperor without the purple". Isaac already bore his new title in May/June, when he was charged with leading Empress Maria of Alania to the Mangana Monastery, where she was confined on the insistence of the Doukas clan.

According to the historian Paul Gautier, Alexios appears to have entrusted his brother with the role of "grand inquisitor and guardian of public order". As such, Isaac headed a special tribunal, and was charged by Alexios with a number of delicate assignments. Thus, when Alexios left for the Dyrrhachium campaign against the Normans in autumn 1081, Isaac was left in charge of keeping order in Constantinople. During the campaign, Alexios was constantly in need of money to pay his troops. A first appeal for financial aid was met by the Komnenoi themselves, as well as their relatives and supporters, but when a second appeal came soon after, Isaac and his mother, who had been left in charge of the government, were at an impasse. After long deliberation, they decided to turn to the treasures of the Church—following a precedent set by previous emperors all the way back to Heraclius (r. 610–641). Thus, in the winter of 1081/1082, and without prior warning, Isaac went to the Hagia Sophia, convened the patriarchal synod, and in a forceful speech convinced the clergy to allow the confiscation and melting of gold and silver items to cut coin to pay the troops. Only a single member of the synod, the deacon John Metaxas, opposed the move, and even went as far as ridiculing Isaac, but once the confiscation began, Leo, the Metropolitan of Chalcedon, who had not been present at the synod, started to publicly denounce the decision as well as Isaac, its chief instigator. This led to Leo's trial and dismissal by a mixed court composed of senators and senior clergymen in January 1086.

Because of his extensive education, according to Anna Komnene, Isaac was placed in charge of the inquest against the philosopher John Italos in February 1082. Finding him guilty of unorthodox teachings, Isaac sent Italos before an ecclesiastical tribunal. In 1083, he donated precious sacral vestments to the Monastery of Petritzos, founded by the general Gregory Pakourianos. In 1087, on account of the Pecheneg raids into the Balkans, the confiscation of ecclesiastical treasure was repeated. According to John the Oxite, some recalcitrant monks who tried to hide precious vessels were even whipped and imprisoned. Once again Leo of Chalcedon began to denounce these measures, and in late 1087 Isaac, who once again was left in charge of Constantinople in his brother's absence, exiled him to either Sozopolis or Mesembria on the Black Sea coast of Thrace.

In 1092/1094, his son John Komnenos, recently named doux of Dyrrhachium, was accused by Archbishop Theophylact of Ohrid of plotting against Alexios. A trial was held in front of the emperor at Philippopolis, to where Isaac went in haste. According to Anna Komnene, who gives a detailed account of the proceedings, Isaac himself was not certain of his son's innocence, and maintained a cautious stance until he realized that Alexios himself did not intend to press the matter. Then he intervened forcefully in his son's defence, and even quarreled with his younger brother Adrianos, whom he accused of slander.

In the meantime, the affair of Leo of Chalcedon had flared up again. Leo's nephew, Nicholas of Adrianople, in a letter to his uncle, wrote that Isaac denounced those who opposed the confiscations as "worshipers of matter" (ὑλολάτραι), claiming that they accorded to the precious decorations of the icons the same veneration as to the saints depicted on them. Leo of Chalcedon responded to his nephew with a long theological defence of his positions, which caused great uproar. To defend himself from Leo's criticism, Isaac set about compiling a corpus of patristic and synodal texts against Leo's teachings. As a result, in late 1094, a church council was held at the Palace of Blachernae that examined the affair, under the direct presidency of Alexios I, with Isaac as one of the three judges, along with the patriarchs of Constantinople and Jerusalem, Nicholas Grammatikos and Symeon II. The council ended with Leo's admission of his errors, whereupon he was reinstated in his see. In the words of the historian Konstantinos Varzos, it was "a theological and political triumph for Isaac".

Isaac also became involved in the affair of the doux of Chaldia, Theodore Gabras, and his son Gregory. Gregory was affianced to one of Isaac's daughters, until Theodore married again, to an Alan princess. As the latter was a cousin of Isaac's own wife, the prospective marriage of Gregory and Isaac's daughter was called off as uncanonical. Sometime between 1094 and 1098, when Gregory was held as a hostage for his father's loyalty in Constantinople, Isaac hosted Theodore Gabras at his palace on the shores of the Propontis. Isaac also played a leading role in the uncovering of the conspiracy of the four Anemas brothers, which took place sometime between 1097 and 1104 and involved several senior military and civil officials. Isaac persuaded the senator Solomon to reveal the members and details of the plot. Shortly after that he also led the inquiries against the Bogomil leader Basil the Physician.

Towards the end of his life, Isaac entered a monastery, taking the monastic name John. He died "one year and a few months" after his mother, sometime between 1102 and 1104. His wife also entered a monastery under the name Xene. She died about a year after him, and Emperor Alexios took his children under his care. Isaac is commemorated by the Eastern Orthodox Church in the Synodikon of Orthodoxy, which is read on the Sunday of Orthodoxy.

== Family ==
Isaac Komnenos was married to the Georgian princess Irene, by whom he had four sons and at least two daughters:

- John Komnenos (1073 – after 1136), protosebastos and governor (doux) of Dyrrhachium from 1092 to 1106, married Maria Doukaina, niece of Empress Irene Doukaina.
- Unnamed daughter (born c. 1075), married a son of the protoproedros Constantine Doukas. Varzos suggests the name of Anna for her.
- Alexios Komnenos (born c. 1077 – after 1108), sebastos and doux of Dyrrhachium from 1106 until after 1108, married a lady called Zoe, of unknown family.
- Unnamed daughter (born c. 1080), engaged to Gregory Gabras until the engagement was broken off as uncanonical in 1094. Varzos suggests the name Maria for her. Her later fate is unknown.
- Constantine Komnenos (c. 1085 – after 1147), sebastos and doux of Beroea in 1107, later megas droungarios. Married a lady issued from the Antiochos and Euphorbenos clans.
- Adrianos Komnenos (c. 1088 – 1157/64), sebastos and doux of Chaldia. Married a lady of unknown name or family, and became a monk. In c. 1139 he became Archbishop of Bulgaria as John IV.
- Sophia Komnene (c. 1094 – c. 1130), married the sebastos Dokeianos.
- Eudokia Komnene (c. 1096 – after 1150), married the sebastos Nikephoros Botaneiates.

== Sources ==
- Gautier, Paul (1971). "Le synode des Blachernes (fin 1094). Étude prosopographique" [The Synod of Blachernae (end of 1094). A Prosopographical Study]. Revue des études byzantines (in French). 29: 213–284. doi:10.3406/rebyz.1971.1445.
- Kazhdan, Alexander, ed. (1991). The Oxford Dictionary of Byzantium. Oxford and New York: Oxford University Press. ISBN 0-19-504652-8.
- Skoulatos, Basile (1980). Les personnages byzantins de l'Alexiade: Analyse prosopographique et synthèse [The Byzantine Personalities of the Alexiad: Prosopographical Analysis and Synthesis] (in French). Louvain-la-Neuve and Louvain: Bureau du Recueil Collège Érasme and Éditions Nauwelaerts.
- Varzos, Konstantinos (1984). Η Γενεαλογία των Κομνηνών [The Genealogy of the Komnenoi] (PDF) (in Greek). Vol. A1. Thessaloniki: Centre for Byzantine Studies, University of Thessaloniki.

Preceded by Joseph Tarchaneiotes	Doux of Antioch; 1074–1078	Succeeded by Michael Maurex or Vasak Pahlavuni
New title	Sebastokrator of the Byzantine Empire; 1081–1102/04	Succeeded by Andronikos Komnenos
