= Bardas Hikanatos =

Bardas Hikanatos (Greek: Βάρδας Ἱκανάτος) was a senior Byzantine official under Alexios I Komnenos (r. 1081–1118)

He is first mentioned, without rank or office, as one of the participants in the synod of March 1082 that condemned John Italos. In March 1093 and March 1094, he is mentioned, in acts concerning the Monastery of Saint John the Theologian on Patmos, with the rank of kouropalates and the post of praetor (civil governor) of the joint themes of Hellas and the Peloponnese. By late 1094 he was back in Constantinople and had been promoted to nobelissimos. There he took part in the Council of Blachernae against Leo of Chalcedon, and is listed 16th in the list of precedence of the officials attending.

From the hagiography of Saint Meletios the Younger, it is known that he occupied the office of praetor of Hellas and the Peloponnese three times, twice while Meletios was alive, and once at the time of his death, in September 1105, and Hikanatos even participated in the saint's burial.

== Sources ==
- Gautier, Paul (1971). "Le synode des Blachernes (fin 1094). Étude prosopographique" [The Synod of Blachernae (end of 1094). A Prosopographical Study.]. Revue des études byzantines (in French). 29: 213–284. doi:10.3406/rebyz.1971.1445.
