= Irene of Alania =

Georgian princess

Irene of Alania, was a Georgian Princess, cousin of the Byzantine Empress Maria of Alania and wife of the Sebastokrator Isaac Komnenos, brother of Byzantine Emperor Alexios I Komnenos.

== Family ==
Irene is believed to be the daughter of Prince Demetrius of Georgia, son of King George I Bagrationi of Georgia, according to Cyril Toumanoff. Her paternal cousin was Empress Maria of Alania.

== Marriage and issue ==
It has been speculated that Irene was the final mistress of the old Emperor Constantine IX Monomachos, around 1051, but this is unconfirmed. If so, she was certainly granted the title of sebaste. Irene married Isaac Komnenos around 1072, the marriage being personally arranged by Emperor Michael VII Doukas. Irene's husband was the elder brother of the future Emperor Alexios I Komnenos, under whose reign he received the title of Sebastokrator and other honors. Their children were:

- John Komnenos, protosebastos, and governor of Dyrrhachium
- Alexios Komnenos, sebastos, and governor of Dyrrhachium
- Constantine Komnenos, sebastos, and governor of Beroea
- Adrianos Komnenos, monk, later ordained as Archbishop of Bulgaria
- Sophia Komnene, married the sebastos Dokeianos
- Eudokia Komnene, married the sebastos Nikephoros Botaneiates
