= Eustratius Garidas =

Ecumenical Patriarch of Constantinople from 1081 to 1084

- Ecumenical Patriarch of Constantinople
- Church: Church of Constantinople
- In office: 8 May 1081 – July 1084
- Predecessor: Cosmas I of Constantinople
- Successor: Nicholas III of Constantinople

Personal details
- Born: Eustratius Garidas
- Died: After 1084
- Denomination: Eastern Orthodoxy

Eustratius Garidas (Greek: Εὐστράτιος Γαριδᾶς; died after 1084) was Ecumenical Patriarch of Constantinople (as Eustratius II) between 8 May 1081 and July 1084. A monk, he was elevated to the patriarchal throne through the influence of the mother of the emperor Alexios I Komnenos, Anna Dalassene, to whom he had become an intimate advisor. He was an eunuch.

Anna Comnena and other writers describe him as uneducated and of weak character. Due to his illiteracy and apparent gullibility he was involved in the case of John Italus, whom his predecessor, Patriarch Cosmas I of Constantinople had condemned. Alexios I had to take over the case against Italus as Eustratius, in his words, "rather dwelt at leisure and preferred peace and quiest to noisy throngs and turned to God alone".

During the war against the Normans, at the beginning of the reign of Alexios I in 1081–1082, Eustratius did not resist the expropriation of artworks and consecrated treasures of the capital's churches, destined to be melted for currency to pay the army of Alexios I. This lack of resistance was not forgiven by Leo of Chalcedon who sought to expel him from his throne, at one point also accusing him, without evidence, of diverting part of the appropriate treasure for his own use. Finally, accused of heresy, Eustratius was cleared by a commission of inquiry established by Alexios I in 1084, but he chose to abdicate.

== Bibliography ==
- Ecumenical Patriarchate
- Buckler, Georgina, Anna Komnena - A Study, Oxford University Press, 1929.
- Anna Comnena; The Alexiad, New York, Penguin Books, 2003.
- Joan M. Hussey, The Orthodox Church in the Byzantine Empire, Oxford University Press, 1986.

Eastern Orthodox Church titles
Preceded by Cosmas I	Ecumenical Patriarch of Constantinople; 1081 – 1084	Succeeded by Nicholas III
