= Gregory Pakourianos the Younger =

Gregory Pakourianos (Greek: Γρηγόριος Πακουριανός, romanized: Grēgorios Pakourianos; c. 1080 – before April 1105) was a Byzantine aristocrat and provincial governor.

He was born in c. 1080, and was the grandson of the distinguished military commander, the Iberian domestikos ton scholon Gregory Pakourianos, who was killed fighting against the Pechenegs in 1086. In c. 1100 he married a daughter (possibly named Anna) of Nikephoros Komnenos, the youngest brother of Byzantine emperor Alexios I Komnenos (r. 1081–1118). On that occasion Gregory was raised to the rank of sebastos, and appointed to the governance of a province near Ohrid—either Dyrrhachium or Skopje—but he died soon after, sometime before April 1105.

Gregory is known chiefly through the letters addressed to him by the archbishop Theophylact of Ohrid. Furthermore, in a letter by Theophylact's letter to Adrianos Komnenos, Gregory is praised as a capable and benevolent governor, who showed particular care and attention to the weak and destitute. By his wife, he had one known son, Nikephoros Pakourianos.

== Sources ==
- Varzos, Konstantinos (1984). Η Γενεαλογία των Κομνηνών [The Genealogy of the Komnenoi] (PDF) (in Greek). Vol. A1. Thessaloniki: Centre for Byzantine Studies, University of Thessaloniki.
