= Anna Dalassene =

Byzantine noblewoman

- Born: c. 1025/30
- Died: 1 November 1100/02
- Noble family: Dalassenos
- Spouse: John Komnenos
- Issue: 8, including Manuel, Isaac, Alexios I, Adrianos and Nikephoros
- Father: Alexios Charon

Anna Dalassene (Greek: Ἄννα Δαλασσηνή; c. 1025/30 – 1 November 1100/02) was a Byzantine noblewoman who was the mother of Emperor Alexios I Komnenos and the wife of John Komnenos. Playing a role in Komnenian coup d'état of 1081, she helped the Komnenoi rise to power in the 11th century. She exercised great influence over her son, Alexios I Komnenos, who gave her the title of empress. She administered the empire as regent during his many absences from Constantinople on long military campaigns during the early part of his reign. As empress-mother, she exerted more influence and power than the empress-consort, Irene Doukaina, a woman whom she hated because of past intrigues with the Doukai.

== Life ==
=== Early life and family ===
Anna was the daughter of Alexios Charon, and a lady of the noble Dalassenos family. Her maternal grandfather was named Adrianos Dalassenos, evidently a son of the magistros and doux of Antioch, Theophylact Dalassenos. Very little is known about her father, who was an obscure imperial official in Italy. Her mother's family, the Dalassenoi, were a distinguished family of the Byzantine military aristocracy, beginning with Theophylact's father Damian Dalassenos in the late 990s.

The date of Anna's birth is unknown, but is placed around the years 1025–1030. Likewise the date of her marriage to John Komnenos is variously placed in c. 1040, or c. 1044/45. The couple had eight children, five sons and three daughters. These were, by order of birth, Manuel Komnenos (c. 1045), Maria Komnene (c. 1047), Isaac Komnenos (c. 1050), Eudokia Komnene (c. 1052), Theodora Komnene (c. 1054), Alexios I Komnenos (1057), Adrianos Komnenos (c. 1060), and Nikephoros Komnenos (c. 1062).

In 1057, John's elder brother Isaac, at the head of a group of generals, rebelled against Michael VI and forced him off the throne. At the time of the revolt, John held the post of doux, but after his brother's victory, he was raised to the rank of kouropalates and appointed as domestikos ton scholon of the West. This event evidently whetted Anna's ambition; her seals from this time show her using the feminine form of her husband's titles, kouropalatissa and domestikissa. Isaac's reign was cut short by his clash with the powerful Patriarch of Constantinople, Michael Keroularios, who had been instrumental in securing Michael VI's abdication, and the powerful civil aristocracy of the capital. Keroularios and his supporters led the opposition against Isaac's stringent economizing policies. Although Keroularios was deposed, Isaac resigned on 22 November 1059 and withdrew to the Stoudios Monastery. The crown then passed to Constantine X Doukas (r. 1059–1067), although Nikephoros Bryennios the Younger, who married Anna's granddaughter Anna Komnene, asserts that it was first offered to John. Despite the vehement opposition of Anna, who stressed the benefits to their children, John refused the crown. Anna tried hard to persuade John to become emperor and did everything she could, even to "tears and groans" to make John change his mind, but to no avail. According to the historian Konstantinos Varzos, this version of events is suspect, and may well be a post-fact attempt at legitimizing the eventual usurpation of the throne by Anna's son, Alexios Komnenos. At any rate, Anna remained implacably opposed to the Doukas family thereafter.

=== Rivalry with the Doukai ===
Widowed on 12 July 1067, she guided her family's fortunes over the next decades with the sole purpose of paving her children's path to the throne. In May of the same year, Constatine X Doukas had died, and Anna allied herself with his widow, the Empress-regent Eudokia Makrembolitissa. To strengthen her family's position, she took care to arrange marriage alliances with the leading aristocratic families. Thus her daughter Maria married Michael Taronites, while Eudokia married Nikephoros Melissenos. Anna also allied herself closely with Eudokia Makrembolitissa's second husband, Romanos IV Diogenes (r. 1068–1071), supporting him in his struggle against the members of the intrigues of the Doukas family. Her youngest daughter Theodora married Romanos' son Constantine, and her eldest son Manuel was one of the favourite generals of Romanos and was named kouropalates and protostrator. When he died of an ear infection in early 1071, Anna hurried to his deathbed in Bithynia. As soon as he was buried, she tried to put forward her third son Alexios to replace him, but he was judged too young.

The Doukai returned to power after the defeat and capture of Romanos IV by the Seljuk Turks at the Battle of Manzikert on 19 August 1071. The Caesar John Doukas, brother of Constantine X, engineered a coup that sidelined Empress Eudokia Makrembolitissa and raised to the throne Eudokia's oldest son Michael VII Doukas (r. 1071–1078) instead. When Romanos was released from captivity, the Caesar's sons even led troops against him. After he was captured, the Caesar ordered the former emperor to be blinded. During this time, Anna was accused of maintaining a secret correspondence with the deposed emperor and brought to trial. She defended herself with courage, and Bryennios states that at one point, she produced a crucifix from under her cloak and proclaimed her innocence and that "Here is my judge and yours. Think of him before deciding and take heed that your decision is worthy of the supreme judge, who knows the secrets of men's hearts". The judges were divided, with some wanting to set her free, but others fearing the Caesar's wrath. She was therefore exiled along with her sons to the island of Prinkipos in early 1072. It is possible that she was tonsured as well, if that had not happened earlier, as her seals bear the titles monache ("nun") as well as kouropalatissa. Alternatively this may have happened later, in 1081 (see below).

After the death of Romanos IV on 9 August 1072, the Komnenoi were allowed to return from exile to the imperial court. Although her enmity of the Doukai continued unabated, it appears that Michael VII tried to win her over and consented to the marriage of Anna's eldest surviving son, Isaac, with Irene, the cousin of Michael's empress-consort Maria of Alania. In September 1077, despite her initial firm opposition, she relented to the marriage of her second surviving son, Alexios, to Irene Doukaina, the granddaughter of the Caesar John Doukas. The marriage probably took place early in 1078, when the bride was only twelve years old.

=== Role in the Komnenian revolt ===
Anna was to play a prominent role in the Komnenian coup d'état of 1081, along with the current empress, Maria of Alania. First married to Michael VII Doukas and secondly to Nikephoros III Botaneiates (r. 1078–1081), Maria was preoccupied with the future of her son by Michael VII, Constantine Doukas. Nikephoros III intended to leave the throne to one of his close relatives, and this resulted in Maria's alliance with the Komnenoi. The real driving force behind this political alliance was Anna Dalassene.

Already closely connected to the Komnenoi through her cousin Irene's marriage to Isaac Komnenos, the Komnenoi brothers were able to see the empress under the pretense of a friendly family visit. Furthermore, to aid the conspiracy Maria had adopted Alexios as her son, though she was only five years older than he. Maria was persuaded to do so on the advice of her own "Alans" and her eunuchs, who had been instigated to do his by Isaac Komnenos. Knowing Anna's tight hold on her family, it must have been with her implicit approval that he was adopted. As a result, Alexios and Constantine, Maria's son, were now adoptive brothers and both Isaac and Alexios took an oath that they would safeguard his rights as emperor. By secretly giving inside information to the Komnenoi, Maria was an invaluable ally.

Just as on previous occasions, the betrothal of her granddaughter to a relative of Botaneiates' did not stop Anna's intrigues against the new regime. As stated in the Alexiad, when Isaac and Alexios left Constantinople in mid-February 1081 to raise an army against Botaneiates, Anna quickly and surreptitiously mobilized the remainder of the family and took refuge in the Hagia Sophia. From there she negotiated with the emperor for the safety of family members left in the capital, while protesting her sons' innocence of hostile actions.

Under the falsehood of making a vesperal visit to worship at the church, she deliberately excluded the grandson of Botaneiates and his loyal tutor, met with Alexios and Isaac and fled for the forum of Constantine. The tutor found them missing and eventually found them on the palace grounds but she was able to convince him that they would return to the palace shortly. Then to gain entrance to both the outer and inner sanctuary of the church the women pretended to the gatekeepers that they were pilgrims from Cappadocia who had spent all their funds and wanted to worship before starting their return trip. However, before they were to gain entry into the sanctuary, Straboromanos and royal guards caught up with them to summon them back to the palace. Anna then protested that the family was in fear for their lives, her sons were loyal subjects (Alexios and Isaac were discovered absent without leave), and had learned of a plot by enemies of the Komnenoi to have them both blinded and had, therefore, fled the capital so they may continue to be of loyal service to the emperor.

She refused to go with them and demanded that they allow her to pray to the Mother of God for protection. This request was granted and Anna then manifested her true theatrical and manipulative capabilities: "She was allowed to enter. As if she were weighed down with old age and worn out by grief, she walked slowly and when she approached the actual entrance to the sanctuary made two genuflections; on the third she sank to the floor and taking firm hold of the sacred doors, cried in a loud voice: "Unless my hands are cut off, I will not leave this holy place except on one condition: that I receive the emperor's cross as guarantee of safety".

Nikephoros III Botaneiates was forced into a public vow that he would grant protection to the family. Straboromanos tried to give her his cross, but for Anna this was not sufficiently large enough so that all bystanders could witness the oath. She also demanded that the cross be personally sent by Botaneiates as a vow of his good faith. He obliged, sending a complete assurance for the family with his own cross. At the emperor's further insistence, and for their own protection they took refuge at the convent of Petrion, where eventually they were joined by Irene Doukaina's mother, Maria of Bulgaria.

Botaneiates allowed them to be treated as refugees rather than guests. They were allowed to have family members bring in their own food and were on good terms with the guards from whom they learned the latest news. Anna was highly successful in three important aspects of the revolt: she bought time for her sons to steal imperial horses from the stables and escape the city, she distracted the emperor and gave her sons time to gather and arm their troops and she gave a false sense of security to Botaneiates that there was no real treasonous coup against him.

=== Rise to power ===
Isaac and Alexios Komnenos entered the capital victoriously on 1 April 1081. However, even this fortunate turn of events did not deter Anna from preventing the Doukas family from sharing the imperial coronation - she had never approved of the marriage of Alexios and Irene Doukaina, and the situation became acute now that the teenage Irene would become Augusta. Although Alexios' candidature for the throne had been agreed upon by the Doukai and the Komnenoi at the army camp at Schiza, the elder Isaac still had supporters.

The fact that Alexios was crowned on April 4 while Irene was crowned a full week later is highly suspicious. It is likely that Anna and Maria of Alania had planned for Irene's departure and wanted to rule with Alexios as "both" mothers and wife. The latter was already an empress mother twice-over and far more experienced than the naive, teenaged, childless Irene who was yet to have any children. In her own account of this event, Anna Komnene asserts that the Komnenoi refused to drive Maria from the palace because of her many kindnesses and because "she was in a foreign country, without relatives, without friends, with nobody whatever of her own folk'.

However, Irene was finally crowned by the patriarch Cosmas. Anna Dalassene however was allowed to choose the next patriarch, Eustratius Garidas as a compensation.

=== Life during Alexios' reign ===
From the Komnenian seizure of power in 1081 until either her banishment or death, she was to play a very public role in administering the military and civil services of the empire. Her son Alexios was for many years under her influence. She was however constantly at odds with her daughter-in-law Irene and had, perhaps egregiously, assumed total responsibility for the upbringing and education of her granddaughter Anna Komnene.

Anna's official titles during this period were "mother of the emperor" and "despoina (empress)".

Given the culture and traditions of medieval Greek Byzantium, it is unusual that Anna wielded such power over her son as well as the empire. Though he needed a reliable advisor, and essentially owed his mother for his accession to the throne because of her intrigues to stay in a powerful position for fifteen years after his succession until he was in his mid-forties defies credulity. As middle age approached, Alexios was determined to rule in his own right. After the military campaigns of the 1080s, he was able to stay in the capital and became frustrated over of Anna's tight hold on the administration, however productive this seemed to be. Anna, always one to sense the changing winds of fortune sensed his frustration, and decided to leave before she was forced out and retired to her private apartments attached to her monastic foundation of the Christ Pantepoptes. The germs of his discontent may have started as early as 1089 when in an imperial communication he complained of Anna's generosity to the monastery of Docheiariou.

Sources are conflicted concerning the year of Anna's retirement and death. Anna Komnene is strangely silent about her disappearance from court and this may suggest that her grandmother may have been involved in something questionable, perhaps a heretical sect such as the Bogomils. However, we know that she was wielding her power when the First Crusade passed through the city in late 1096 or early 1097, perhaps retiring after their departure. Since we are not sure of the date and reason of retirement, Zonaras records that she resided 'imperially with honor' at her foundation for several years, dying in extreme old age just over a year before her son, Isaac. Most ironically, she died on the day forecast by an Athenian astrologer for Alexios himself. She died on a 1 November between 1100 and 1102.

Under the Komnenian dynasty, women continued to not only retain their roles set by previous empresses but made great strides in founding monasteries, patronizing churchmen, theologians and literary figures and being more assertive in imperial administration: most prominent in such roles were Anna Dalassene and her contemporary, Maria of Alania.

== Legacy ==
Anna Dalassena is memorialized in Judy Chicago's The Dinner Party.

== Sources ==
- Cheynet, Jean-Claude; Vannier, Jean-François (1986). Études Prosopographiques (in French). Paris: Publications de la Sorbonne. ISBN 978-2-85944-110-4.
- Dawes, Elizabeth A., ed. (1928). The Alexiad. London: Routledge & Kegan Paul.
- Diehl, C. Figures byzantines. Vol. 1 (2nd ed.). Paris: Armand Colin Year=1938–1939. pp. 317–342.
- Garland, Linda (1999). Byzantine Empresses: Women and Power in Byzantium AD 527–1204. Routledge. ISBN 978-0-415-14688-3.
- Kazhdan, Alexander, ed. (1991). The Oxford Dictionary of Byzantium. Oxford and New York: Oxford University Press. ISBN 0-19-504652-8.
- Lilie, Ralph-Johannes; Ludwig, Claudia; Pratsch, Thomas; Zielke, Beate (2013). Prosopographie der mittelbyzantinischen Zeit Online. Berlin-Brandenburgische Akademie der Wissenschaften. Nach Vorarbeiten F. Winkelmanns erstellt (in German). Berlin and Boston: De Gruyter.
- Runciman, S. (1949). "The End of Anna Dalassena". Annuaire de l' Institut de Philologie et d'Histoire Orientales et Slaves. 9: 517–524.
- Skoulatos, Basile (1980). Les personnages byzantins de l'Alexiade: Analyse prosopographique et synthèse [The Byzantine Personalities of the Alexiad: Prosopographical Analysis and Synthesis] (in French). Louvain-la-Neuve and Louvain: Bureau du Recueil Collège Érasme and Éditions Nauwelaerts.
- Varzos, Konstantinos (1984). Η Γενεαλογία των Κομνηνών [The Genealogy of the Komnenoi] (PDF) (in Greek). Vol. A1. Thessaloniki: Centre for Byzantine Studies, University of Thessaloniki.
