= Niketas Eugenianos =

Byzantine rhetor and writer

Niketas Eugenianos (Νικήτας Εὐγενειανός; fl. 12th century) was a Byzantine rhetor and writer.

His life is almost entirely unknown to us. The main sources are his own works. He was a pupil of Theodore Prodromos and a preceptor of Stephen Komnenos, the son of Constantine Komnenos.

Niketas wrote several works both in prose and in verse, including three monodies for the death of his teacher Theodore Prodromos (one in prose, two in verse), two epithalamia, a collection of epigrams — including one on the heroine of the Aethiopica by Heliodorus, whose attribution is however debated between Niketas and Theodore Prodromos — and a monody for Stephen Komnenos.

His best known work is a Greek novel in dodecasyllables (three sections are in hexameters: III 263–288 and 197–320, songs, and VI 205–235, a lament), titled Drosillas and Charikles, which was written "in imitation of the most blessed philosopher Prodromos". Prodromos composed a novel in nine books, titled Rhodantes and Dosikles, which Niketas used as a source of inspiration. The novel is also inspired by Achilles Tatius and Heliodorus and possibly by Eustathios Makrembolites.

== Editions ==
- Eugenianos, Niketas (1819). Boissonade, J. F. (ed.). Narratio amatoria. Vol. I–II. Paris: S. & J. Luchtmans.
- Boissonade, J. F. (1856). "Romanciers Byzantins: Nικήτου τοῦ Εὐγενειανοῦ τῶν κατὰ Δροσίλλαν καὶ Χαρικλέα βιβλίων θʹ". In Hirschig, W. A. (ed.). Erotici scriptores. Paris: A. F. Didot: reprint of Boissonade 1819.
- Hercher, R., ed. (1859). Erotici scriptores Graeci. Vol. II. Lipsiae: B. G. Teubner. pp. 437–552.
- Eugenianos, Niketas (1990). Conca, F.; Giusti, A. (eds.). De Drosillae et Chariclis amoribus. London Studies in Classical Philology, 24. Amsterdam: J. C. Gieben. ISBN 978-90-70-26595-3: reference ed. for the novel.
  - Conca, F., ed. (1994). Il romanzo bizantino del XII secolo. Classici greci. Turin: UTET. pp. 305–497. ISBN 88-02-04826-6: Italian translation based on Conca & Giusti 1990.
  - Jeffreys, E., ed. (2012). Four Byzantine Novels. Translated Texts for Byzantinists, 1. Liverpool: University Press. pp. 339–458. ISBN 978-1-84631-825-2: English translation based on Conca & Giusti 1990.
