= John Komnenos (Domestic of the Schools) =

Byzantine military leader (c. 1015–1067)

- Kouropalates
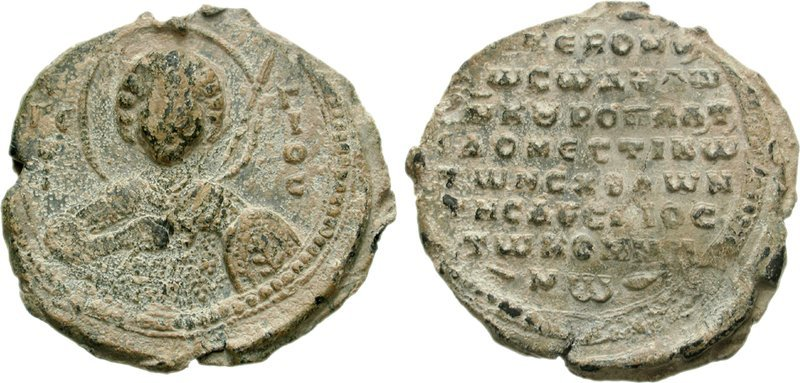
- Lead seal of John Komnenos as kouropalates and Domestic of the Schools

Domestic of the Schools of the West
- In office 1057 – 1059
- Monarch: Isaac Komnenos

Personal details
- Born: c. 1015
- Died: 12 July 1067
- Spouse: Anna Dalassene
- Children: Manuel Komnenos; Maria Komnene; Isaac Komnenos; Eudokia Komnene; Theodora Komnene; Alexios I Komnenos; Adrianos Komnenos; Nikephoros Komnenos
- Parent: Manuel Erotikos Komnenos (father)

John Komnenos (Greek: Ἰωάννης Κομνηνός, Iōannēs Komnēnos; c. 1015 – 12 July 1067) was a Byzantine aristocrat and military leader. The younger brother of Emperor Isaac I Komnenos, he served as Domestic of the Schools during Isaac's brief reign (1057–59). When Isaac I abdicated, Constantine X Doukas became emperor and John withdrew from public life until his death in 1067. Through his son Alexios I Komnenos, who became emperor in 1081, he was the progenitor of the Komnenian dynasty that ruled the Byzantine Empire from 1081 until 1185, and the Empire of Trebizond from 1204 until 1461.

== Life ==
John Komnenos was born c. 1015 as the younger son of the patrikios Manuel Erotikos Komnenos, a senior military commander in the late reign of Basil II (r. 976–1025). He is first mentioned in 1057, the year his elder brother Isaac I Komnenos, at the head of a group of generals, rebelled against Michael VI (r. 1056–1057) and forced him off the throne. At the time of the revolt, John held the post of doux, but after his brother's victory, he was raised to the rank of kouropalates and appointed as Domestic of the Schools of the West. Nothing is known of John's activities during his brother's reign, although Nikephoros Bryennios the Younger, who married John's granddaughter Anna Komnene, says that in his capacity as Domestic of the West he left his (unspecified) acts as an "immortal monument" to the people of the Balkan provinces.

Isaac's reign was cut short by his clash with the powerful Patriarch of Constantinople, Michael Keroularios, who had been instrumental in securing Michael VI's abdication, and the powerful civil aristocracy of the capital. Keroularios and his supporters led the opposition against Isaac's stringent economizing policies, forcing him to resign on 22 November 1059, after which he withdrew to the Stoudios Monastery. The crown then passed to Constantine X Doukas (r. 1059–1067), although Bryennios asserts that it was first offered to John, who refused it, despite the pressure of his wife, Anna Dalassene, to accept. According to the historian Konstantinos Varzos, however, this version is suspect, and may well be a post-fact attempt at legitimizing the eventual usurpation of the throne by John's son, Alexios I Komnenos (r. 1081–1118).

John is not mentioned in the sources during the reign of Constantine X, perhaps indicating, according to Konstantinos Varzos, that he was in imperial disfavour, despite Bryennios' assertion that both he and his brother remained much honoured by the new emperor. The late 12th-century typikon of the Monastery of Christ Philanthropos, founded by Alexios I's wife Irene Doukaina, is the only source to record that John Komnenos retired to a monastery, probably at the same time as his wife, Anna Dalassene. He died as a monk on 12 July 1067.

== Family ==
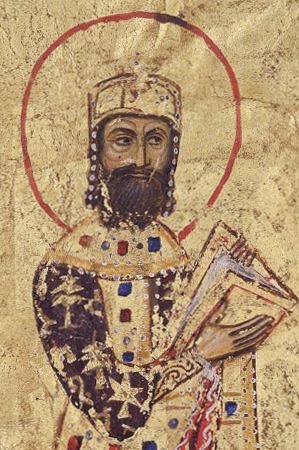
Miniature portrait of Alexios I Komnenos

John Komnenos married Anna Dalassene, the daughter of Alexios Charon, most likely in 1044. Anna, born c. 1028, long outlived her husband and after his death ran the family as its undisputed matriarch. Anna became involved in conspiracies against the Doukas family, whom she never forgave for taking the throne in 1059. Later she also played a major role in the successful overthrow of Nikephoros III Botaneiates (r. 1078–1081) and the rise of her son Alexios to the throne. After that, and for about fifteen years, she served as the virtual co-ruler of the empire alongside her son. She then retired to a monastery, where she died in 1100 or 1102.

With Anna, John had eight children, five sons and three daughters:

- Manuel Komnenos (c. 1045–1071), kouropalates and protostrator, married a relative of Romanos IV Diogenes (r. 1068–1071)
- Maria Komnene (c. 1047 – after 1094), married the panhypersebastos Michael Taronites
- Isaac Komnenos (c. 1050–1102/4), sebastokrator, married Irene, daughter of the ruler of Alania
- Eudokia Komnene (c. 1052 – before 1136), married Nikephoros Melissenos
- Theodora Komnene (c. 1054 – before 1136), married the kouropalates Constantine Diogenes, son of Romanos IV
- Alexios Komnenos (1057–1118), the future emperor, married Irene Doukaina
- Adrianos Komnenos (c. 1060–1105), protosebastos, married Zoe Doukaina
- Nikephoros Komnenos (c. 1062 – after 1136), sebastos and droungarios of the fleet

== Sources ==
- Kazhdan, Alexander, ed. (1991). The Oxford Dictionary of Byzantium. Oxford and New York: Oxford University Press. ISBN 0-19-504652-8.
- Kouroupou, Matoula; Vannier, Jean-François (2005). "Commémoraisons des Comnènes dans le typikon liturgique du monastère du Christ Philanthrope (ms. Panaghia Kamariotissa 29)" [Commemorations of the Komnenoi in the liturgical typikon of the Monastery of Christ Philanthropos (ms. Panaghia Kamariotissa 29)]. Revue des études byzantines (in French). 63: 41–69. doi:10.3406/rebyz.2005.2305.
- Varzos, Konstantinos (1984). Η Γενεαλογία των Κομνηνών [The Genealogy of the Komnenoi] (PDF) (in Greek). Vol. A1. Thessaloniki: Centre for Byzantine Studies, University of Thessaloniki.
