= Nicholas III of Constantinople =

Ecumenical Patriarch of Constantinople from 1084 to 1111

- Ecumenical Patriarch of Constantinople
- Church: Church of Constantinople
- In office: August 1084 – April 1111
- Predecessor: Eustratius II of Constantinople
- Successor: John IX of Constantinople

Personal details
- Born: Nicholas Kyrdiniates Antioch of Pisidia
- Died: April 1111 Constantinople
- Denomination: Eastern Orthodoxy

Nicholas III Grammatikos or Grammaticus (Greek: Νικόλαος Γραμματικός; died April 1111) was an Eastern Orthodox prelate who became Ecumenical Patriarch of Constantinople in 1084–1111.

Educated in Constantinople, Nicholas spent much of his early years in Antioch of Pisidia, where it is believed he took his monastic vows. He eventually left the city around 1068 when it was threatened by Seljuk Turkish raids and moved to Constantinople, where he founded a monastery dedicated to John the Baptist at Lophadion, near the Gate of St. Romanus. In August 1084, he replaced Patriarch Eustratius II Garidas, who had resigned his office. Nicholas' surname was Kyrdiniates, but he is best known by his sobriquet Grammatikos ('the Grammarian') or Theoprobletos ('the One sent by God'), due to the manner of his election, as he was chosen by drawing of lots placed on the altar of the Hagia Sophia.

By nature, a conciliarist, Nicholas III was immediately presented with a number of delicate and difficult issues. He took the side of Emperor Alexios I Komnenos in the case of Leo of Chalcedon, who protested over Alexios I's confiscation of church treasures to alleviate the financial strain the Byzantine–Norman wars had caused, which was resolved when he presided over the Council of Blachernae in 1094. Nicholas was also prominent in the fight against doctrinal heresy, for instance condemning as heretical the Bogomil leader Basil the Physician. But he was very cautious in the ongoing conflict between the provincial metropolitans and the Patriarchate. In spite of some hostile opposition from the clergy of the Hagia Sophia, he ended up supporting Niketas of Ankyra against the emperor's right to elevate metropolitans and exerted a great deal of energy trying to restrict the influence of the chartophylax. Nicholas III was also very concerned with ecclesiastical discipline. He wrote a monastic rule for Mount Athos monastery while ordering the removal of the Vlachs from Mount Athos. He also rigorously enforced the regulations around fasting.

Meanwhile, the ongoing political situation in the Byzantine Empire especially in Anatolia after the disaster of the Battle of Manzikert forced Nicholas III to discuss a union of the Orthodox and Catholic churches with Pope Urban II. On the other hand, in at least one letter attributed to him, Nicholas held to the Orthodox position about the major contentious issues of the day, rejecting the Roman Catholic views on the Filioque, the azymes, and Papal primacy.

Nicholas III died in April or May 1111 at Constantinople.

== Bibliography ==
- Gautier, Paul (1971). "Le synode des Blachernes (fin 1094). Etude prosopographique" [The Synod of Blachernae (Late 1094). Prosopographical Study]. Revue des études byzantines (in French). 29: 213–284. doi:10.3406/rebyz.1971.1445.
- Kazhdan, Alexander; Cutler, Anthony (1991). "Nicholas III Grammatikos". In Kazhdan, Alexander (ed.). The Oxford Dictionary of Byzantium. Oxford and New York: Oxford University Press. p. 1467. ISBN 0-19-504652-8.

Eastern Orthodox Church titles
Preceded by Eustratius II	Ecumenical Patriarch of Constantinople; 1084 – 1111	Succeeded by John IX
