= Duchy of Durazzo (Republic of Venice) =

Venetian polity

- 1205–1213
- Flag

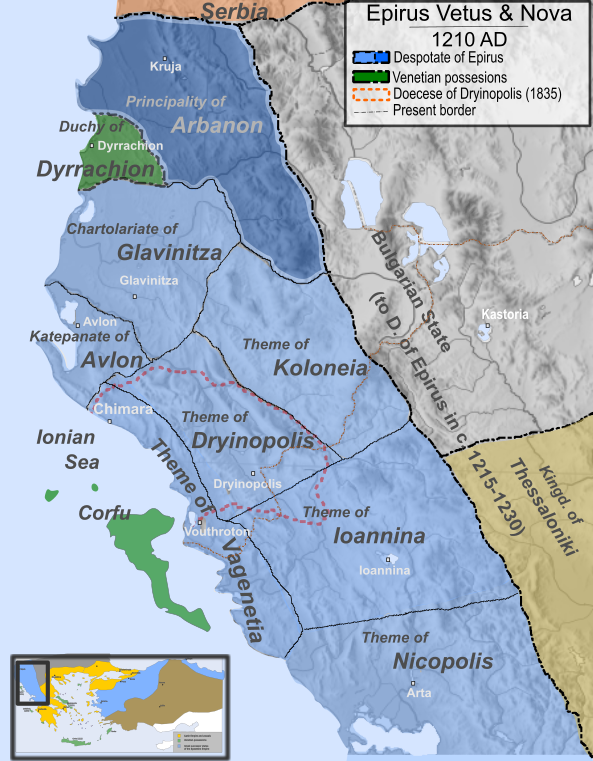
- Map of Epirus c. 1210, with the Venetian Duchy of Durazzo and Corfu (in green) and the Despotate of Epirus (in blue)
- Capital: Durazzo
- Common languages: Italian, Venetian, Latin (official); Albanian, Medieval Greek
- Historical era: Middle Ages
  - Established: 1205
  - Treaty with Epirus: 1210
  - Captured by Epirus: 1213
Preceded by	Succeeded by
Theme of Dyrrhachium	Despotate of Epirus
- Today part of: Albania

The Duchy of Durazzo (Italian: Ducato di Durazzo, Venetian: Ducato de Durazo, Albanian: Dukati i Durrës, Greek: Δουκάτο του Δυρράχιο, romanized: Doukáto tou Dyrráchio, Latin: Ducatus Dyrrhachii) was a short-lived overseas colony of the Republic of Venice, encompassing the port city of Durazzo (modern Durrës in Albania) and its environs. It was established in 1205, following the dissolution of the Byzantine Empire in the aftermath of the Fourth Crusade, and lasted until it was reclaimed by the Byzantine Despotate of Epirus in 1213.

== Background ==
During the late 11th and the 12th centuries, the city of Durazzo and its province (the "Theme of Dyrrhachium"), had risen to assume great strategic importance to the Byzantine Empire. The city was the "key of Albania", the western terminus of the Via Egnatia and the main point of entry for trade, but also for the Norman invasions, from Italy, and was ideally placed to control the actions of the Slavic rulers of the western Balkans.

== Establishment and end ==
After the sack of Constantinople by the Fourth Crusade and the dissolution of the Byzantine Empire in 1204, the city was up for grabs. In the partition treaty among the Crusaders, the Republic of Venice had secured recognition of her claims on the westernmost Byzantine provinces, which were crucial in view of the vital Venetian interests in the Adriatic Sea. However, the claim had to be quickly enforced, lest others, and chiefly the Venetians' main rivals, the Genoese, occupy it first. As a result, in the summer of 1205, the Venetian fleet carrying the new Latin Patriarch of Constantinople to his see, also attacked and captured Durazzo and Corfu.

At Durazzo, the Venetians met little opposition and one of the captains, Marino Vallaresso, was appointed as the new Duke of Durazzo, a sign of the value the Venetians placed in their new possession. For the same reason they insisted on the appointment of the city's Roman Catholic archbishop, who replaced the previous Greek Orthodox prelate, directly by Venice, without the involvement of the Pope.

Although the Venetians had also laid claim to the mainland region of Epirus, they did not move to establish control there. Consequently, the area came under the rule of a Byzantine Greek aristocrat, Michael I Komnenos Doukas, who established his own principality there, the Despotate of Epirus. Doukas' power grew quickly, and he soon controlled all the mainland between the Venetian Duchy of Durazzo and the Corinthian Gulf in the south. Unable and unwilling to undertake the effort necessary confront him, the Venetians preferred to conclude a compromise treaty with Doukas in June 1210, which recognized him as ruler of Epirus, but as the nominal vassal of Venice, which had claimed this territory since 1204. This treaty was expedient for Doukas, but did not mean the abandonment of his own designs on Durazzo: in 1213, his forces captured the city, ended the Venetian presence, and restored a Greek Orthodox archbishop to the local see. Soon after, Doukas' forces also took Corfu, and moved to extend his rule over Albania and western Macedonia, capturing the lordship of Croia and pushing up to the borders of Zeta.

== Aftermath ==
In 1216, the Venetians turned to the new Latin Emperor, Peter II of Courtenay, to help them recover Durazzo. Peter landed at Durazzo in 1217, but although he may have briefly recovered the city, he was soon defeated and captured by Michael Doukas' half-brother and successor, Theodore Komnenos Doukas, and the city returned to Epirote hands.

After the Epirote conquest, the city declined as an entrepôt for trade, as the Venetians moved their commerce to Ragusa instead.

The city continued to change hands in the 13th and 14th centuries between the Greeks of Epirus and the restored Palaiologan Byzantine Empire, the Angevins of Naples, the Serbs, and finally the Thopia. Their rulers would ally themselves to Venice and accept their suzerainty. Venice once again took possession of the city in 1392 as part of Venetian Albania, holding it until it was conquered by the Ottoman Empire in 1501.

== Sources ==
- Angold, Michael (1997). The Byzantine Empire, 1025–1204: A Political History (Second ed.). London and New York: Longman. ISBN 0-582-29468-1.
- Ducellier, Alain (1981). La façade maritime de l'Albanie au Moyen Age. Durazzo et Valona du ΧIe au XVe siècle [The Albanian Seaboard in the Middle Ages. Durazzo and Valona from the 11th to the 15th Century] (in French). Thessaloniki: Institute for Balkan Studies.
- Fine, John V. A. (1994) [1987]. The Late Medieval Balkans: A Critical Survey from the Late Twelfth Century to the Ottoman Conquest. Ann Arbor, Michigan: University of Michigan Press. ISBN 978-0-472-10079-8.
- Kazhdan, Alexander, ed. (1991). The Oxford Dictionary of Byzantium. Oxford and New York: Oxford University Press. ISBN 0-19-504652-8.
- Nicol, Donald M. (1988). Byzantium and Venice: A Study in Diplomatic and Cultural Relations. Cambridge: Cambridge University Press. ISBN 0-521-34157-4.
- Robbert, Louise Buenger (1985). "Venice and the Crusades". In Zacour, N.P.; Hazard, Harry W. (eds.). A History of the Crusades, Volume V: The impact of the Crusades on the Near East. University of Wisconsin Press. pp. 379–451.
- Stephenson, Paul (2004). Byzantium's Balkan Frontier: A Political Study of the Northern Balkans, 900–1204. Cambridge: Cambridge University Press. ISBN 0-521-77017-3.
