= Leo Rhabdouchos =

Byzantine nobleman and diplomat

Leo Rhabdouchos or Rhabduchus (Greek: Λέων Ῥαβδοῦχος; fl. 917) was a Byzantine nobleman and diplomat. He served as the strategos of Dyrrachion and was promoted from protospatharios to that of magistros, and became Logothete of the Drome (foreign minister).

== Biography ==
Leo was apparently a relative to the ruling Macedonian dynasty, and a brother-in-law of the famed diplomat Leo Choirosphaktes. There is a mention of a strategos of Dyrrachion named Rhabdouchos in 880, who accompanied the Sicilian campaign of protovestiarios Prokopios. While M. Laskaris and T. Živković believed this was the same person as Leo Rhabdouchos, G. Ostrogorsky believed that this Rhabdouchos was in fact his father or uncle. Leo Rhabdouchos is mentioned as magister and Logothete of the Drome (foreign minister) in a letter of Leo Choirosphaktes to the son of Niketas Monomachos dated to c. 910. P. Komatina believed Leo Rhabdouchos was protospatarios and strategos of Dyrrachion in c. 880, and rose to become magister and Logothete of the Drome in c. 910. In events surrounding 917, the De Administrando Imperio of emperor Constantine VII Porphyrogennetos (r. 913–959) mentioned him as "protospatarios Leo Rhabdouchos, who later received the office of magister and Logothete of the Drome", which led to the various interpretations in historiography listed.

According to DAI, after the death of emperor Leo (912), the Byzantine strategos of Dyrrachion, Leo Rhabdouchos, met and held talks with Serbian ruler Petar in "Pagania" (Narentine land), which at the time was under Petar's rule. The Byzantine–Bulgarian war had started in 913, and the strategos most likely had the mission of gaining Petar's support in the war. At the time, Zahumlje, a principality in southern Dalmatia, was ruled by Michael, who according to the DAI "became jealous" and contacted Simeon I of Bulgaria and told him that the Byzantine emperor bribed Petar with gifts to bring with him the "Turks" (Hungarians) and attack Bulgaria. Historiography tends to date this to 917. M. Laskaris believed that the meetings between Petar and Leo Rhabdouchos were held in 894–896 during Byzantine–Bulgar fighting, rather than that a strategos, who was not Leo Rhabdouchos, met with Petar in 917. T. Živković supported M. Laskaris's view, however, seeing it too early to tie Michael of Zahumlje to 894–896, he put forward the possibility that there were other talks between Petar and the strategos held in 917 which Michael informed Simeon of. P. Komatina believed that the strategos that met with Petar in 917 was not Rhabdouchos, and that it was Constantine VII's own interpretation as he knew Rhabdouchos had at some time been strategos of Dyrrachion.

== Sources ==
- Komatina, Predrag (2021). Константин Порфирогенит и рана историја Јужних Словена [Constantine Porphyrogenitus and the Early History of South Slavs]. Византолошки институт, Београд. pp. 250–253. ISBN 978-86-83883-28-8.
- Stephenson, Paul (2000). Byzantium's Balkan Frontier: A Political Study of the Northern Balkans, 900–1204. Cambridge, United Kingdom: Cambridge University Press. ISBN 0-521-77017-3.
- Tougher, Shaun (1997). The Reign of Leo VI (886-912): Politics and People. Leiden; New York; Köln: Brill. ISBN 9004108114.
