= Michael Italikos =

- Born: c. 1090
- Died: c. 1157; Constantinople, Eastern Roman Empire
- Scientific career
- Fields: Medicine
- Workplaces: Pantokrator Hospital
- Academic advisors: Theodore of Smyrna
- Notable students: Theodore Prodromos

Michael Italikos (also Michael Italicus; Greek: Μιχαὴλ Ἰταλικός; c. 1090 – c. 1157) was a Byzantine Eastern Orthodox cleric (metropolitan of Philippopolis) and medical instructor (didaskalos iatron) at the Pantokrator Hospital that had been established by Emperor John II Komnenos (r. 1118–43) in 1136. Pantokrator was a medical centre, at which Italicus lectured and explained physicians Hippocrates (460–370 BC) and Galen (129–200), and illustrated diseases through patient cases.

Between 1147 and 1166 he served as the Archbishop of Philippopolis.

He wrote a monody on the death of Andronikos, son of Alexios I. He delivered basilikoi logoi (encomia) to the emperors John II and Manuel I.

His pupil Theodore Prodromos described smallpox.
