= Cosmas I of Constantinople =

Ecumenical Patriarch of Constantinople from 1075 to 1081

Saint Cosmas I of Constantinople
- Ecumenical Patriarch of Constantinople
- Church: Church of Constantinople
- In office: 2 August 1075 – 8 May 1081
- Predecessor: John VIII of Constantinople
- Successor: Eustratius II of Constantinople

Personal details
- Born: Antioch
- Died: c. 1082
- Denomination: Eastern Orthodoxy

Cosmas I of Constantinople (Greek: Κοσμᾶς Α΄; died c. 1082), also referred to as Cosmas the Jerusalemite in Greek (Κοσμάς Ιεροσολυμίτης) was Ecumenical Patriarch of Constantinople from 2 August 1075 to 8 May 1081.

== Biography ==
Originally from Antioch, Cosmas was educated and resided in Jerusalem for a large part of his life, earning his geographic epithet. He may have been appointed to the patriarchate out of a monastery near or in Jerusalem.

He crowned the Byzantine Emperor Nikephoros III Botaneiates. He disapproved of Nikephoros' marriage to the ex-wife of the previous Emperor Michael VII Doukas but took no further action than degrading the priest who performed the service. Later he used his influence to try to convince him to resign as his popularity declined and the empire entered a period of instability.

Cosmas I likewise crowned by Emperor Alexios I Komnenos in 1081. When Alexios I attempted to repudiate his wife Irene Doukaina to marry the ex-empress Maria of Alania, Cosmas I successfully blocked the move as she had already been twice married. Cosmas I resigned or was forced out soon after, as Alexios I's mother, Anna Dalassene, disliked Irene's link to the Doukas family and resented this interference. She further pressed for the resignation as she wished to place her favourite on the patriarchal throne, which she achieved with the appointment of the ill-educated Eustratius Garidas. According to Anna Komnene, Cosmas I resigned voluntarily on the condition that he be allowed to crown Irene Doukaina empress first, which he did and then left.

The most important synodal action taken by Cosmas I was the condemnation, in 1076–1077, of certain heretical views taken by John Italus, a scholar connected to the Doukas family. In a more general sense, Cosmas I's retirement is said to mark a period where, between Alexios I and the emperor Manuel I Komnenos, the Church was moved to a position of dependence on, identification with, and subservience to the state, reversing the greater self-determination the Church had exercised through the eleventh century. The historian John Skylitzes (continuatus) speaks poorly of Cosmas I, suggesting that the emperor selected him for his lack of greatness, writing that after the death of the previous patriarch, Michael I of Constantinople "chose another, not from those of the senate, nor from those of the Great Church, nor any other of the Byzantines famed for word and deed, but a certain monk Cosmas I sprung from the Holy City, and honoured by the Emperor [...] although he was without wisdom or taste [...]".

He was proclaimed a saint by the Orthodox Church, with his feast day on 2 January (new calendar).

== Bibliography ==
- Buckler, Georgina; Anna Komnena - A Study, Oxford University Press, 1929.
- Joan M. Hussey, The Orthodox Church in the Byzantine Empire, Oxford University Press, 1986.
- Paul Magdalino, The Empire of Manuel Komnenos, Cambridge University Press, 1993.
- John Julius Norwich, "Byzantium - The Decline and Fall", New York, Alfred A. Knopf, 1996, p. 7.

Eastern Orthodox Church titles
Preceded by John VIII	Ecumenical Patriarch of Constantinople; 1075 – 1081	Succeeded by Eustratius II
