= Nikephoros Komnenos (brother of Alexios I) =

- Sebastos and megas droungarios tou stolou of the Byzantine Empire
- Spouse: Wife (name unknown)
- Issue: Daughter (name unknown), Alexios
- House: Komnenos
- Father: John Komnenos
- Mother: Anna Dalassene
- Religion: Eastern Orthodox Church

Nikephoros Komnenos (Greek: Νικηφόρος Κομνηνός; c. 1062 – after 1136) was a Byzantine aristocrat and high official. The youngest brother of Emperor Alexios I Komnenos, he was appointed second-in-command of the Byzantine navy.

== Life ==
He was the fifth son and last child of John Komnenos and Anna Dalassene, and thus the youngest brother of Emperor Alexios I Komnenos (r. 1081–1118). According to Nikephoros Bryennios the Younger, when Alexios and his older brothers entered military service, Nikephoros and his fourth brother, Adrianos, remained with their mother, who ensured that they received a thorough, encyclopedic education.

When Alexios came to the throne, he raised his relatives to high dignities, often newly created ones: thus Nikephoros was titled a sebastos, and given the office of megas droungarios of the fleet. The holder of this office was the second-in-command of the Byzantine navy after the megas doux, but Nikephoros is not recorded as having ever held an active command. Indeed the fleet appears to have been led by Eustathios Kymineianos after c. 1087, who was himself promoted to megas droungarios of the fleet sometime in c. 1101/02. Thus either Nikephoros lost his appointment, or several megaloi droungarioi existed at once, with Nikephoros' post being merely honorary.

His life is likewise extremely obscure; for this reason, Basile Skoulatos calls him "the least-known member of the Komnenos family". He is only once mentioned in the Alexiad, and is not recorded as having played any role during the reign of Alexios, nor during that of Alexios' son and successor John II Komnenos (r. 1118–1143), except for a reference to a megas droungarios Nikephoros as one of the witnesses of the typikon of the Pantokrator Monastery, written in 1136. It is unclear to what this exceptional silence of the sources is due; Konstantinos Varzos suggested that he might have fallen into disfavour as one possible reason. It is also not entirely certain whether the Nikephoros of 1136 is the same as Alexios' brother: only the title of megas droungarios is given, without any family connection or surname, and even the title is ambiguous, as it could be applied to both the megas droungarios of the fleet as to the megas droungarios tes viglas.

== Family ==
He married a lady of unknown name and family, and had at least two children: a daughter, who married Gregory Pakourianos the Younger, and a son, the sebastos Alexios, whose life is otherwise unknown.

== Sources ==
- Guilland, Rodolphe (1967). "Le Drongaire de la flotte, le Grand drongaire de la flotte, le Duc de la flotte, le Mégaduc" [The Drungary of the Fleet, the Grand Drungary of the Fleet, the Duke of the Fleet, the Megaduke]. Recherches sur les institutions byzantines, Tome I (in French). Berlin: Akademie-Verlag. pp. 535–562.
- Skoulatos, Basile (1980). Les personnages byzantins de l'Alexiade: Analyse prosopographique et synthèse [The Byzantine Personalities of the Alexiad: Prosopographical Analysis and Synthesis] (in French). Louvain-la-Neuve and Louvain: Bureau du Recueil Collège Érasme and Éditions Nauwelaerts.
- Varzos, Konstantinos (1984). Η Γενεαλογία των Κομνηνών [The Genealogy of the Komnenoi] (PDF) (in Greek). Vol. A1. Thessaloniki: Centre for Byzantine Studies, University of Thessaloniki.
