= Siege of Dyrrhachium (1107–1108) =

Italo-Norman siege of Durrës

- Part of the Byzantine–Norman wars
Date	November 1107 – September 1108
Location	Dyrrhachium (modern Durrës) 41.317°N 19.450°E
Result	Byzantine victory

Belligerents
Byzantine Empire	Italo-Norman Kingdom of Sicily

Commanders and leaders
Alexios I Komnenos; Alexios Komnenos, doux of Dyrrhachium	Bohemond I of Antioch

The siege of Dyrrhachium took place from November 1107 until September 1108, as the Italo-Normans under Bohemond I of Antioch besieged the Adriatic port city of Dyrrhachium, now known as Durrës. Dyrrhachium was held for the Byzantine Empire by its doux Alexios Komnenos, a nephew of the reigning Byzantine emperor, Alexios I Komnenos (r. 1081–1118).

The siege is described at length in the Alexiad of Anna Komnene, daughter of Emperor Alexios. Previously, Emperor Alexios had been heavily defeated while trying to relieve a previous Norman siege of the same city in 1081. In this siege, Alexios chose not attempt to end the siege by means of a pitched battle but attempted to weaken the Normans by dispatching sorties to occupy the passes in the Normans' rear and prevent them from foraging.

As the siege continued, Alexios attempted to spread disease in the Norman camp and used Greek fire to burn down their siege engines. Finally, Bohemond sought terms which led to the Treaty of Devol, whereby Bohemond and the Principality of Antioch became Byzantine vassals.
