= Theodore of Smyrna =

12th-century Byzantine philosopher

- Born: Smyrna, Byzantine Empire
- Died: c. 1112

Education
- Academic advisor: John Italus

Philosophical work
- Era: Medieval philosophy
- Region: Western philosophy
- School: Aristotelianism
- Institutions: University of Constantinople
- Notable students: Michael Italikos
- Main interests: Natural philosophy; Ancient Greek philosophy; Theology

Theodore of Smyrna (Ancient Greek: Θεόδωρος Σμυρναῖος; died c. 1112) was a Byzantine philosopher, judge and teacher, active in Constantinople during the reign of Alexios I Komnenos.

He was of Smyrnaean origin, but was raised in Constantinople, where he became a prominent public figure and held the title hypatos ton philosophon in 1082, after Michael Psellos and John Italus. Theodore held several Byzantine titles and offices, including kouropalates, protoedros, and koiaistor. According to Linos Benakis, he is attested in 1112 in theological discussions with Peter Grossolanus.

His main surviving philosophical work is the Epitome of Nature and Natural Principles according to the Ancients, preserved in a single manuscript, Codex Vindobonensis Theologicus Graecus 134. The work summarizes ancient Greek views on nature and natural principles and represents a Byzantine contribution to the history of ancient natural philosophy.
