= Vitalien Laurent =

French priest and Byzantinist (1896–1973)

Vitalien Laurent (born Louis Philippe Olivier Laurent; Séné, 26 May 1896 – Paris, 21 November 1973) was a French priest and Byzantinist. He was editor of the journal Échos d'Orient (predecessor of the Revue des études byzantines).

He published nearly 700 works in the fields of Greek hagiography, Byzantine history, Byzantine sigillography and Byzantine ecclesiastical history. Most notably, he edited Sylvester Syropoulos' account of the Council of Florence, the registers of the Constantinopolitan Patriarchy (years 1204–1309) and a synodal tome from the age of Patriarch Matthew the 1st.

He was a researcher of the French CNRS from 1958; before that, he had spent several years in Poland, Romania and Germany, affiliated to the universities of Poznan, Warsaw, Bucharest – where he co-founded the French Institute of Byzantine Studies –, and Munich. In 1952, he had become conservator of the Vatican medal collection. He was member of several scientific academies and exclusive orders around Europe, most notably the German Archaeological Institute (correspondent member, 1931), the Société d'Études Byzantines in Athens (1940) and the Order of the British Empire (honorary member, 1944).

== Sources ==
- AA., VV. (1974). "Bibliographie du Père Vitalien Laurent". Revue des études byzantines (in French). 32: 343–379 – via Persée.fr.
- Darrouzès, Jean (1974). "Le Père Vitalien Laurent (1896-1973)". Revue des études byzantines (in French). 32: 3–14 – via Persée.fr.
