= Alexios Charon =

Alexios Charon (Greek: Ἀλέξιος Χάρων, fl. early 11th century) was a Byzantine official in southern Italy and the maternal grandfather of Emperor Alexios I Komnenos (reigned 1081–1118), the founder of the Komnenian dynasty.

Very little is known about his life. The only references to him come from the history of Nikephoros Bryennios the Younger, who married his great-granddaughter Anna Komnene. Bryennios reports that "Charon" was a sobriquet given to him for his bravery, referring to the ferryman of the underworld in Greek mythology, but the name is attested as an actual surname as well.

On Alexios' career, Bryennios only reports that he "handled the emperor's affairs" in the Byzantine provinces of southern Italy (the Catepanate of Italy) some time in the first half of the 11th century. The exact office that Alexios held is unknown; it has been suggested that he may have been the governor (catepan) of Italy, but his name appears in no other source. The historian of Byzantine Italy Vera von Falkenhausen suggested that he might be identical with Alexios Xiphias, who was catepan in 1006/07, but Xiphias died in 1007, and Charon's daughter — and mother of Emperor Alexios I Komnenos — Anna Dalassene was not born until sometime between 1020 and 1030.
