= John Komnenos (governor of Dyrrhachium) =

Byzantine aristocrat

- Born: 1073
- Died: After 1136
- Relatives: Isaac Komnenos (father), Alexios I Komnenos (uncle), Alexios Komnenos (brother)
- Military career
- Allegiance: Byzantine Empire
- Rank: Doux
- Conflicts: Conflicts with Rascia and Dalmatia

John Komnenos (Greek: Ἰωάννης Κομνηνός, romanized: Iōannēs Komnēnos) was a Byzantine aristocrat, the nephew of Emperor Alexios I Komnenos (r. 1081–1118) and governor (doux) of the strategically important city and theme of Dyrrhachium from 1091 to c. 1106.

== Biography ==
=== Early life ===
John was born in late 1073, the eldest son of the sebastokrator Isaac Komnenos, older brother of Emperor Alexios I Komnenos (r. 1081–1118), and his Georgian wife, Irene "of Alania". In 1081, his uncle, Emperor Alexios, proposed to the German emperor Henry IV (r. 1056–1105), a marriage match between John and a German princess. Alexios recommended his nephew as both handsome and of prudent character, but nothing came of this proposal.

=== Career ===
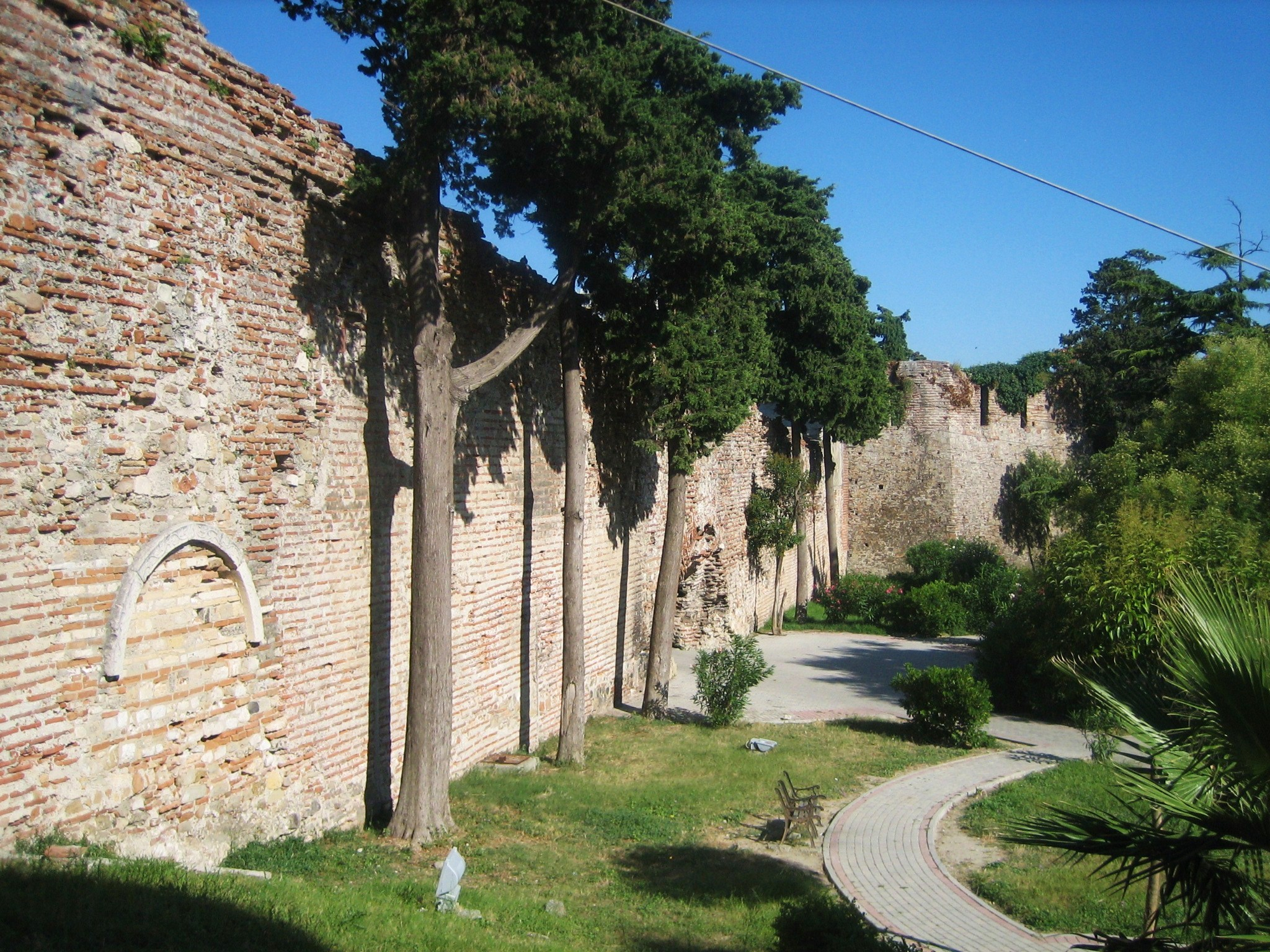
The Byzantine-era city walls of Dyrrhachium (modern Durrës, Albania)

In early 1091, John was chosen by Alexios to replace John Doukas as the governor (doux) of Dyrrhachium, in modern-day Albania. The city was of great importance to the Byzantine Empire, as the "key of Albania" and the main point of entry from Italy into the Balkans, a fact illustrated by the role it played in the Norman invasion under Robert Guiscard, in the early years of Alexios's reign. Soon after the assumption of his duties, however, he was accused by Archbishop Theophylact of Bulgaria of plotting against the Emperor. To defend himself against the accusation, John travelled to Philippopolis, where Alexios resided. It is not clear whether the allegations had any substance; nevertheless, the affair evolved into a family quarrel between Alexios and his brother Isaac, who was also present. Eventually, Alexios dismissed the allegations and reconfirmed John in his post.

Later, in 1094, despite his military inexperience, John was charged with confronting raids by the Serbs under Vukan of Rascia into the Byzantine province. John allowed himself to become involved in prolonged negotiations with the Serbian ruler, giving the latter valuable time to prepare his forces. When he was ready, Vukan attacked the Byzantines near Lipenion and inflicted a heavy defeat upon them. John travelled to Constantinople to explain his defeat to Alexios, but was not relieved of his post. In 1096, he received and hosted Count Hugh I of Vermandois, whose fleet had been shipwrecked off the coast of Dyrrhachium. John was probably still doux of Dyrrhachium in 1105/06, when he is recorded in the Alexiad, Anna Komnene's history of her father Alexios I's reign, to have been defeated in a campaign against the Dalmatians. As the threat of a renewed Norman invasion by Guiscard's son, Bohemond, loomed, the emperor replaced John with his younger brother Alexios.

=== Marriage and family ===
In c. 1090, John married Maria Doukaina, daughter of the protostrator Michael Doukas—a brother of Alexios I's empress, Irene Doukaina. His wife's name is only attested while she was a nun, so it may represent a monastic name, rather than her birth name. The couple had five children; all of whom died early before their parents. Only the name of a son, Alexios, is known.

Some time after 1130, John and his wife became monks, with John assuming the name of Ignatios. He tore down his father's palace and in its stead erected a monastery dedicated to the Holy Trinity, under the name of Euergetes ("the Benefactor"). Their last child probably died c. 1136, which therefore is also the earliest possible date for the deaths of John and his wife.

== Sources ==
- Angold, Michael (1997). The Byzantine Empire, 1025–1204: A Political History (Second ed.). London and New York: Longman. ISBN 0-582-29468-1.
- Garland, Lynda (2007). "Anna Dalassena, Mother of Alexius I Comnenus (1081-1118)". An Online Encyclopedia of Roman Rulers.
- Kazhdan, Alexander, ed. (1991). The Oxford Dictionary of Byzantium. Oxford and New York: Oxford University Press. ISBN 0-19-504652-8.
- Skoulatos, Basile (1980). Les personnages byzantins de l'Alexiade: Analyse prosopographique et synthèse [The Byzantine Personalities of the Alexiad: Prosopographical Analysis and Synthesis] (in French). Louvain-la-Neuve and Louvain: Bureau du Recueil Collège Érasme and Éditions Nauwelaerts.
- Varzos, Konstantinos (1984). Η Γενεαλογία των Κομνηνών [The Genealogy of the Komnenoi] (PDF) (in Greek). Vol. A1. Thessaloniki: Centre for Byzantine Studies, University of Thessaloniki.

Preceded by John Doukas	Doux of Dyrrhachium; 1092–1106	Succeeded by Alexios Komnenos
