= Basil the Physician =

12th-century Bogomil leader

Basil the Physician (died c. 1111 or c. 1118) was a Bogomil leader in the early 12th century who was condemned as a heretic by Eastern Orthodox patriarch Nicholas III of Constantinople and burned at the stake by Byzantine Emperor Alexius I Comnenus.

Originally a monk and a physician, Basil became a teacher within the Bogomil sect around 1070. He first came to the attention of the emperor after imperial officers had tortured a Bogomil named Diblatius to reveal the identity of their leader. He admitted that Basil was their leader and that he had selected twelve teachers to act as his apostles. The Bogomils, noted for their Manichaean tendencies, iconoclastic principles, and detestation of the Orthodox hierarchy, had been rapidly gaining adherents throughout the empire, and began to cause alarm among the Byzantine clergy. Eager to confront this threat, Basil was ordered to appear before the emperor.

Although promised a private hearing with Alexius, Basil was deceived by the emperor into giving a full confession which was recorded by an imperial clerk. On the basis of this confession, and with Basil refusing to renounce his opinions, the Patriarch of Constantinople, Nicholas the Grammarian, together with a synod of bishops, declared Basil a heretic. Alexius then sentenced Basil to death by being burnt at the stake.

Prior to the sentence being carried out, Alexius attempted on several occasions to have Basil recant, but each time Basil refused to change his mind, stating that angels would descend from heaven to release him from the stake. Finally, Basil was burned as a heretic in the hippodrome of Constantinople.

The date of Basil's execution has been a matter of some speculation due to the muddled narrative of that section of the only primary document that details Basil's trial and death, the Alexiad. Alexander Kazhdan has dated the execution to around the year 1111. According to the 19th-century historian George Finlay, however, although the sentence was passed in 1110, the execution was delayed for eight years, and was performed at the end of Alexius' reign. Finlay used the following passage from Anna Komnena’s The Alexiad to support his argument:

Later, the godless ones were transferred to another very strong prison into which they were cast and after pining away for a long time died in their impiety. This was the last and crowning act of the Emperor's long labours and successes and it was an innovation of startling boldness.

His interpretation of the statement “the last and crowning act of the Emperor's long labours and successes” was that the execution of Basil occurred at the conclusion of Alexius' reign. This opinion has been supported in recent scholarship by Warren Treadgold who, while unwilling to give an exact date, has placed Basil's execution in the final years of Alexius' life, either 1117 or 1118.

== Sources ==
- Treadgold, Warren (1997), A History of the Byzantine State and Society, Stanford University Press, pp. 612–29, ISBN 978-0-8047-2630-6
- Kazhdan, Alexander, ed. (1991). The Oxford Dictionary of Byzantium. Oxford and New York: Oxford University Press. ISBN 0-19-504652-8.
- Finlay, George (1854), History of the Byzantine and Greek Empires from 1057–1453, vol. 2, William Blackwood & Sons
- Comnena, Anna (1969) [Written around 1148], The Alexiad, translated by Sewter, E. R. A., Penguin Classics, Book XV
