= Alexios Komnenos (governor of Dyrrhachium) =

Governor of Dyrrhachium

- Born: c. 1077
- Died: after 1108
- Relatives: Isaac Komnenos (father), Alexios I Komnenos (uncle), John Komnenos (brother)
- Military career
- Allegiance: Byzantine Empire
- Rank: doux
- Conflicts: Siege of Dyrrhachium (1107–1108)

Alexios Komnenos (Greek: Ἀλέξιος Κομνηνός, romanized: Alexios Komnēnos; c. 1077 – after 1108) was a Byzantine aristocrat and nephew of Emperor Alexios I Komnenos. Promoted to the rank of sebastos, he served as doux of Dyrrhachium from 1106 until after 1108. During this time, he led the successful resistance to a siege of Dyrrhachium by Bohemond I of Antioch, leading to the Treaty of Devol.

== Life ==
Born c. 1077, Alexios was the second son and third child of the sebastokrator Isaac Komnenos, older brother of Byzantine emperor Alexios I Komnenos (r. 1081–1118), and his wife Irene of Alania. As an imperial relative, he bore the title of sebastos.

Almost the only details about his life come from the Alexiad, written by his cousin, Anna Komnene. He is first mentioned in the spring of 1106, when he was appointed by his uncle as the military governor (doux) of Dyrrhachium, replacing his older brother John. His earlier life and career are unknown, but it is likely that he had previously held other public posts, just like John, who held his first office at the age of 19. At some point, probably around 1094, he married a certain Zoe, whose family is unknown.

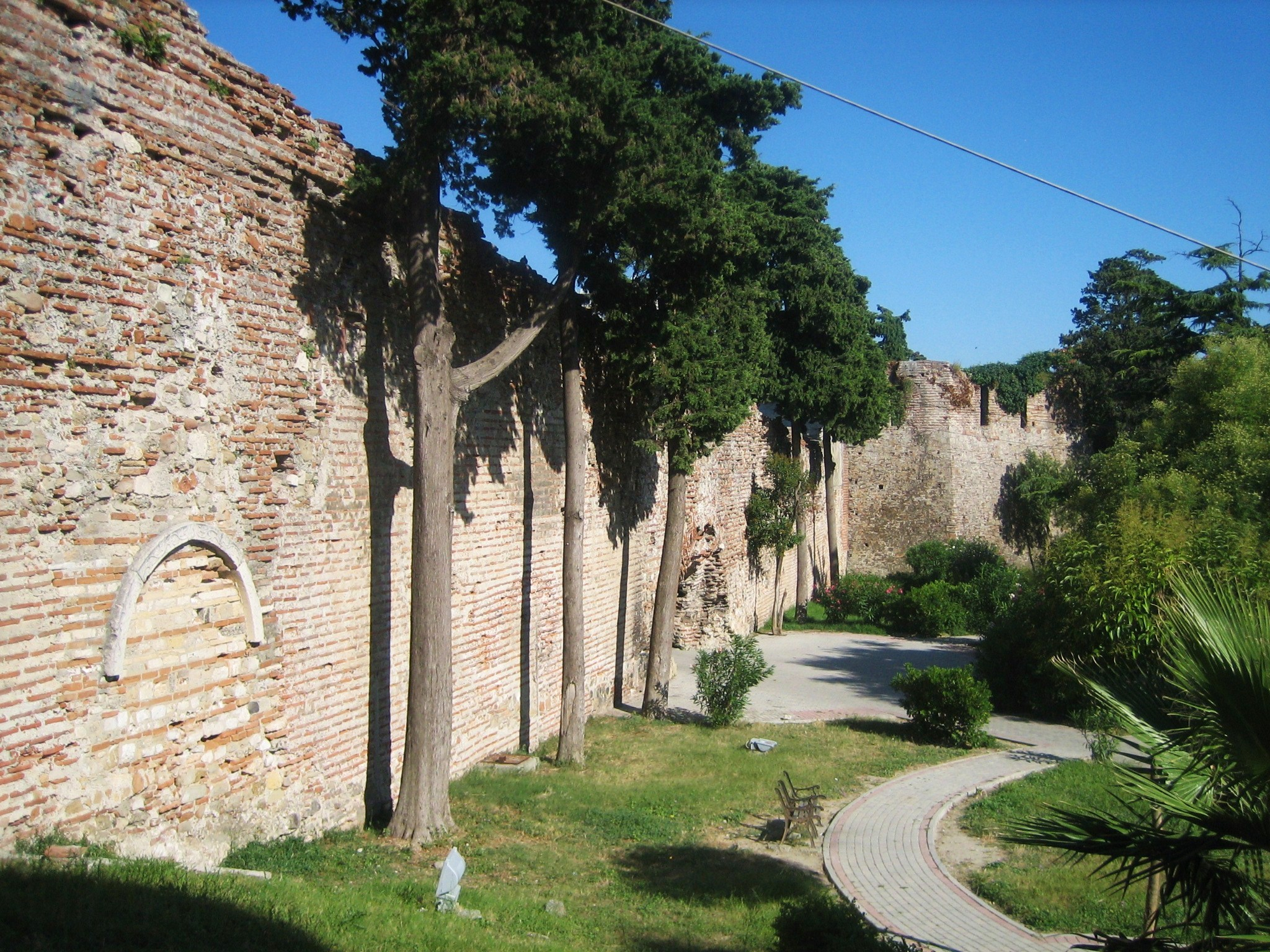
The Byzantine-era city walls of Dyrrhachium (modern Durrës, Albania)

The post of governor of Dyrrhachium was of major importance. The city was of great importance to the Byzantine Empire, as the "key of Albania" and the main point of entry from Italy into the Balkans, a fact illustrated by the role it played in the Norman invasion in the early years of Alexios I's reign. John had proven himself unreliable, having been accused of plotting against the emperor and suffering a defeat at the hands of the Dalmatians. With the threat of another Norman invasion looming, Emperor Alexios confided this crucial post to Alexios instead, in whom he evidently placed greater trust. At the same time, the emperor continued sending letters to his nephew, impressing upon him the need to keep constant watch on the coasts for the first sign of a Norman invasion.

Indeed, in October 1107, Bohemond I of Antioch, emulating his father Robert Guiscard, landed with a strong army at Avlona. Alexios, who had diligently implemented his uncle's instructions, immediately sent news to him. Bohemond laid siege to Dyrrhachium in November 1107, which lasted until the next spring. The Normans employed numerous siege engines, but the defenders held firm, using Greek fire to destroy them. Anna Komnene praises Alexios' leadership, both for his bravery and for the inspiration he provided to his men. In the meantime, the situation of the besiegers worsened as Emperor Alexios sent detachments to occupy the various passes and prevent the Normans from foraging, while he moved with his army to Devol to await an opportunity to strike against them. As famine, disease, and desertions plagued the Norman army, Bohemond sent envoys to Alexios to negotiate. On instructions from his uncle, Alexios forwarded the envoys to the Emperor, leading to the conclusion of the Treaty of Devol in which Bohemond acknowledged the Emperor's suzerainty and became his vassal.

Alexios' subsequent life and career are unknown, as is the date of his death. According to Theodore Balsamon, his wife fell heavily ill shortly after 1130 to a disease deemed incurable by her physicians. In desperation, her family turned to foreign charlatans, who claimed that her illness was due to spells, and proceeded to discover clay poppets, blaming her servants and entourage. The latter were interrogated and even tortured, but to no avail, as the charlatans were responsible for planting these dolls themselves. In the end, as they proved unable to improve her condition, they fled the palace. Some of her relatives and servants who participated in these events were later punished for believing in and abetting sorcery by Patriarch Leo Styppes. The couple probably had a son, named John, known from a single funerary poem, who was a distinguished military commander.

== Sources ==
- Angold, Michael (1997). The Byzantine Empire, 1025–1204: A Political History (Second ed.). London and New York: Longman. ISBN 0-582-29468-1.
- Skoulatos, Basile (1980). Les personnages byzantins de l'Alexiade: Analyse prosopographique et synthèse [The Byzantine Personalities of the Alexiad: Prosopographical Analysis and Synthesis] (in French). Louvain-la-Neuve and Louvain: Bureau du Recueil Collège Érasme and Éditions Nauwelaerts.
- Varzos, Konstantinos (1984). Η Γενεαλογία των Κομνηνών [The Genealogy of the Komnenoi] (PDF) (in Greek). Vol. A1. Thessaloniki: Centre for Byzantine Studies, University of Thessaloniki.

Preceded by John Komnenos	Doux of Dyrrhachium; 1106 – after 1108	Unknown Title next held by Pirogordus
