= Council of Blachernae (1094) =

The Council of Blachernae was convened in late 1094 by the Byzantine emperor Alexios I Komnenos and held in Constantinople at Blachernae Palace in order to resolve the case of Leo of Chalcedon.

== Background ==
Alexios I was in a desperate situation upon ascending the throne in 1081. With the Byzantine-Norman Wars draining what little money remained in the imperial treasury, and Robert Guiscard marching across the Balkans, Alexios was forced to assemble a synod of Greek ecclesiastics who authorised him to employ the wealth gathered as offerings in the churches for public service. This act was violently opposed by many of the clergy, with Leo, Bishop of Chalcedon being among the most prominent.

Leo declared that the government had committed sacrilege in melting down sacred objects which were entitled to the adoration of Christians. Leo's opposition forced the emperor to back down temporarily in 1082. The resumption of confiscations soon after and the lack of resistance by Patriarch Nicholas III and the other leading bishops led Leo to break communion with the patriarchate in 1084. Alexios took advantage of his claims that seemed to attribute more than orthodox importance to these objects. In 1086 another synod was convened and Leo's opinions were condemned as heretical. The synod indicted and deposed him before being banished to Sozopolis where the locals regarded him as a saint.

== Council deliberations ==
Finally in 1094, a local church council was convened to settle the dispute once and for all. The technical discussions centered on the Second Council of Nicaea held in 787, and its ruling that "worship" was due to God only, and the "relative veneration" that could be given to images. This notion of "veneration" was perceived to be ultimately directed to the "prototypes", or the holy person the image was supposed to depict, not the materials out of which the images were fashioned. Leo, however, insisted that a secular use of the material was identical to blasphemous disrespect for the image and, ultimately, the prototype. His technical argument was that the Logos had assumed a human "form" as depicted materially on the icon. Therefore, this 'form' was integrated in the divine person.

The Council repudiated this view, and Leo ultimately accepted the council's view that since "worship" was not addressed to the material image, the urgent requirements of the empire could be met at the cost of giving up the treasures of the church.

== Sources ==
- Kazhdan, Alexander, ed. (1991). The Oxford Dictionary of Byzantium. Oxford and New York: Oxford University Press. pp. 1214–1215. ISBN 0-19-504652-8.
- George Finlay, History of the Byzantine and Greek Empires from 1057 - 1453, Volume 2, William Blackwood & Sons, 1854
- Gautier, Paul (1971). "Le synode des Blachernes (fin 1094). Étude prosopographique". Revue des études byzantines (in French). 29: 213–284. doi:10.3406/rebyz.1971.1445.
