= Constantine Komnenos =

Byzantine aristocrat

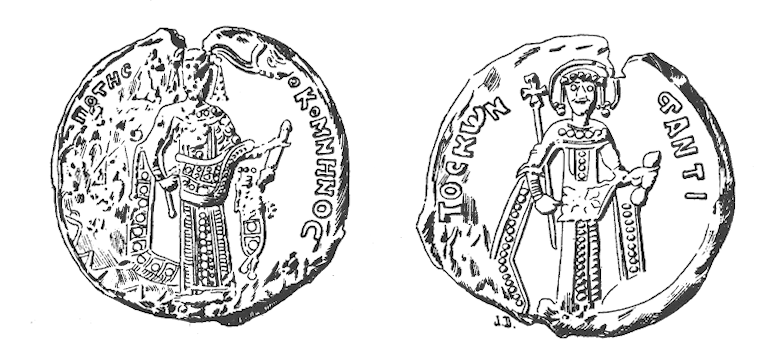
Seal of Emperor Alexios I (left) and Constantine (right)

Constantine Komnenos (Greek: Κωνσταντῖνος Κομνηνός; c. 1085 – after 1147) was a Byzantine aristocrat and nephew of Emperor Alexios I Komnenos. Promoted to the rank of sebastos, he served as doux of Beroea in 1107, and later as megas droungarios. He married a lady from the Antiochos and Euphorbenos clans.

== Sources ==
- Stiernon, Lucien (1963). "Notes de titulature et de prosopographie byzantines: Adrien (Jean) et Constantin Comnène, sébastes". Revue des études byzantines (in French). 21: 179–198. doi:10.3406/rebyz.1963.1306. ISSN 0771-3347.
- Varzos, Konstantinos (1984). Η Γενεαλογία των Κομνηνών [The Genealogy of the Komnenoi] (PDF) (in Greek). Vol. A1. Thessaloniki: Centre for Byzantine Studies, University of Thessaloniki.
