= Leo of Chalcedon =

Eastern Orthodox bishop

Leo of Chalcedon (Greek: Λεών) was an 11th-century Eastern Orthodox bishop of Chalcedon who opposed the appropriation of church treasures by Byzantine emperor Alexios I Komnenos between 1081 and 1091.

Alexios I was in a desperate situation upon ascending the throne in 1081. With the Byzantine-Norman Wars draining what little money remained in the imperial treasury, and Robert Guiscard marching across the Balkans, Alexios was forced to assemble a synod of Greek ecclesiastics who authorised him to employ the wealth gathered as offerings in the churches for public service. This act was violently opposed by many of the clergy, with Leo, Bishop of Chalcedon being among the most prominent.

Leo declared that the government had committed sacrilege in melting down sacred objects which were entitled to the adoration of Christians. Leo's opposition forced the emperor to back down temporarily in 1082. The resumption of confiscations soon after and the lack of resistance by Patriarch Nicholas III and the other leading bishops led Leo to break communion with the patriarchate in 1084. Alexios took advantage of his claims that seemed to attribute more than orthodox importance to these objects. In 1086 another synod was convened in which the emperor's brother, the sebastokrator Isaac played a leading role, assembling the Patristic texts for the trial, and Leo's opinions were condemned as heretical. The synod indicted and deposed him before being banished to Sozopolis where the locals regarded him as a saint.

Though Alexios published a decree justifying the secularization of church treasures, the public outcry was so great that he issued a golden bull ordering restitution to be made for all the sacred plate already employed for the state, and declaring it to be sacrilege for any one in future to apply church treasures for secular uses.

Eventually Leo's teachings were condemned at the Council of Blachernae in 1094, and Leo submitted to its decisions.
