= John Italus =

Byzantine neoplatonic philosopher

- Born: Johannes Italus c. 1025
- Died: after 1082
- Known for: Reviving Neoplatonism
- Scientific career
- Fields: Logic
- Workplaces: University of Constantinople
- Academic advisors: Michael Psellus
- Notable students: Eustratius of Nicaea; Theodore of Smyrna

John Italus or Italos (Greek: Ἰωάννης ὁ Ἰταλός, Iōánnēs ho Italós; Latin: Johannes Italus; c. 1025 – after 1082) was a Byzantine Neoplatonic philosopher.

He was Calabrian in origin, his father being a soldier. He came to Constantinople, where he became a student of Michael Psellus in classical Greek philosophy. He succeeded Psellus in his position as head of the philosophical school. Subsequently, some of his tenets were found heretic in 1076–77 by Patriarch Cosmas I of Constantinople, and in 1082 he was personally condemned, having come into conflict with Emperor Alexios I Komnenos.

== Life ==
John Italus was born in Italy from where he derived his name. His religious and cultural background remains uncertain, though it is likely that he was bilingual in Greek and Italian. He was the son of a Calabrian, who was engaged as an auxiliary in an attempt by the Sicilians to withdraw from their subjection to the Byzantine emperor, and took with him his son, then a child, who thus spent his early years not in the schools but the camp. When the Byzantine commander, George Maniaces, revolted against Constantine IX Monomachos in 1042, the father of Italus fled back to Italy with his son, who after a time found his way to Constantinople. He had already made some attainments, especially in logic. At Constantinople he pursued his studies under several teachers, and last under Michael Psellus, with whom he soon quarrelled, not being able, according to Anna Comnena, to enter into the subtleties of his philosophy, and being remarkable for his arrogance and disputatious temper. He is described as having a commanding figure, being moderately tall and broad-chested, with a large head, a prominent forehead, an open nostril, and well-knit limbs.

He acquired the favour of the emperor Michael VII Doukas (1071–1078) and his brothers; and the emperor, when he was contemplating the recovery of the Byzantine portion of Italy, counting on the attachment of Italus, and expecting to derive advantage from his knowledge of that country, sent him to Dyrrachium; but having detected him in some acts of treachery, he ordered him to be removed. Italus, aware of this, fled to Rome; from whence, by feigning repentance, he obtained the emperor's permission to return to Constantinople, where he fixed himself in the Monastery Zoödochos Pege. On the banishment of Psellus from the capital, and his enforced entrance on a monastic life, Italus obtained the honorary title of "Chief of the Philosophers" (ὕπατος τῶν φιλοσόφων, hýpatos tōn philosóphōn); and filled the office with great appearance of learning; though he was better skilled in logic and in the Aristotelian philosophy than in other parts of science, and had little acquaintance with grammar and rhetoric. He was passionate, and rude in disputation, not abstaining even from personal violence; but eager to acknowledge his impetuosity, and ask pardon for it, when the fit was over. His school was crowded with pupils, to whom he expounded the writings of Proclus and Plato, Iamblichus, Porphyry, and Aristotle. His turbulence and arrogance of spirit seem to have been infectious; for Anna Comnena declares that many seditious persons (tyránnous) arose among his pupils; but their names she could not remember: they were, however, before the accession of Alexios I Komnenos.

The disturbances which arose from the teachings of Italus attracted the emperor's attention apparently soon after his accession; and by his order, Italus, after a preliminary examination by Isaac Comnenus, the brother of Alexios, was cited before an ecclesiastical court. Though protected by the patriarch Eustratius, whose favour he had won, he narrowly escaped death from the violence of the mob of Constantinople, and he was forced publicly and bareheaded to retract and anathematize eleven propositions, embodying the sentiments which he was charged with holding. He was charged with teaching the transmigration of souls, with holding some erroneous opinions about ideas, and with ridiculing the use of images in worship; and he is said to have succeeded in diffusing his heresies among many of the nobles and officers of the palace, to the great grief of the orthodox emperor. Notwithstanding his enforced retractation, he still continued to inculcate his sentiments, until, after a vain attempt by the emperor to restrain him, he was himself sentenced to be anathematized and banished to the Monastery Zoödochos Pege; but as he professed repentance, the anathema was not pronounced publicly, nor in all its extent. He afterwards fully renounced his errors, and made the sincerity of his renunciation manifest.

The above account rests on the authority of Anna Comnena, whose anxiety to exalt the reputation of her father, and her disposition to disparage the people of Western Europe, prevents our relying implicitly on her statements.

Some works of Italus are extant:

1. Ἐκδόσεις εἰς διάφορα Ζητήματα, Expositiones in varias quas varii proposuerunt Quaestiones, Capp. xciii. s. Responsa ad xciii. Quaestiones philosophicas Miscellaneas. The questions were proposed chiefly by the emperor Michael Doukas and his brother Andronicus.
2. Ἕκδοσις εἰς τὰ Τοπικά, Expositio Topicorum Aristotelis
3. Περὶ διαλεκτικῆς, De Dialectica
4. Μέθοδος ῥητορικῆς ἐκδοθεῖσα κατὰ σύνοψιν, Methodus Synoptica Rhetoricae, an art of which Anna Comnena says he was altogether ignorant.
5. Epitome Aristotelis de Interpretatione
6. Orationes
7. Synopsis quinque vocum Porphyrii

== Editions ==
- Wallies, M.: Die gr. Ausleger der Arist. Topik, Berl. 1891
- Успенский, Ф. Ив.: Синодик в неделю Праволсавия, Одесса, 1893
- Cereteli, Gregorius: Joannis Itali Opuscula selecta. Vol. I: De arte dialectica & II: De syllogismis, De arte rhetorica. Tbilisi: -, 1924 & 1926.
- Ioannou, P.: Ioannes Italos, Quaestiones Quodlibetales. Studia Patristica et Byzantina 4. Ettal: Buch-Kunstverlag, 1956.
- Ketschakmadze, N.: Ioannis Itali Opera, Tbilisi, 1966
- Kotsabassi, S.: Joannes Italos & Leon Magentinos: Byzantinische Kommentatoren der aristotelischen Topik. Thessaloniki: Vanias, 1999.

== See also ==
- Gemistos Plethon
