= Paul Gautier =

Paul-Eugène-Marie Gautier (2 July 1931 – 3 July 1983), known as Paul Gautier, was a French Byzantinist.

== Publications ==
- Michel Italikos (1974). Gautier, P. (ed.). Lettres et discours. Archives de l'Orient Chrétien, 14. Paris: Institut Français d'Études Byzantins.
- Gautier, P. (1974). "Le Typikon du Christ Saveur Pantocrator". REB. 32: 1–145. doi:10.3406/rebyz.1974.1481.
- Nicéphore Bryennio (1975). Gautier, P. (ed.). Histoire. Corpus Fontium Historiae Byzantinae, 9. Bruxelles: Byzantion.
- Anne Comnène (1976). Gautier, P. (ed.). Alexiade. Collection Byzantine. Vol. IV. Index. Paris: Les Belles Lettres.
- Théophylacte d'Achride (1980). Gautier, P. (ed.). Discours, traités, poésies. Corpus Fontium Historiae Byzantinae, 16/1. Thessalonica: Association de Recherches Byzantines.
- Gautier, P. (1981). "La Diataxis de Michel Attaliates". REB. 39: 5–143. doi:10.3406/rebyz.1981.2120.
- Gautier, P.; Laurent, V., eds. (1981). Les Corpus des sceaux de l'empire byzantin. Vol. II. Paris: Institut Français d'Études Byzantins.
- Gautier, P. (1982). "Le typikon de la Théotokos Évergétis". REB. 40: 5–101. doi:10.3406/rebyz.1982.2131.
- Théophylacte d'Achride (1986). Gautier, P. (ed.). Lettres. Corpus Fontium Historiae Byzantinae, 16/2. Thessalonica: Association de Recherches Byzantines.
- Michael Psellus (1989). Gautier, P. (ed.). Theologica minora. Bibliotheca Teubneriana. Vol. I. Leipzig: B. G. Teubner.

== Sources ==
- Darrouzès, Jean (1984). "L'activité scientifique de Paul Gautier". Revue des études byzantines (in French). 42 (1): 365–370.
- Failler, Albert (1984). "La bibliographie de Paul Gautier". Revue des études byzantines (in French). 42 (1): 371–378.
