= Dyrrhachium (theme) =

Province of the Byzantine Empire

Theme of Dyrrhachium Δυρράχιον, θέμα Δυρραχίου Thema e Durrësit Provintia Dirrachii et Arbani
- Theme of the Eastern Roman Empire
- 9th century–1205
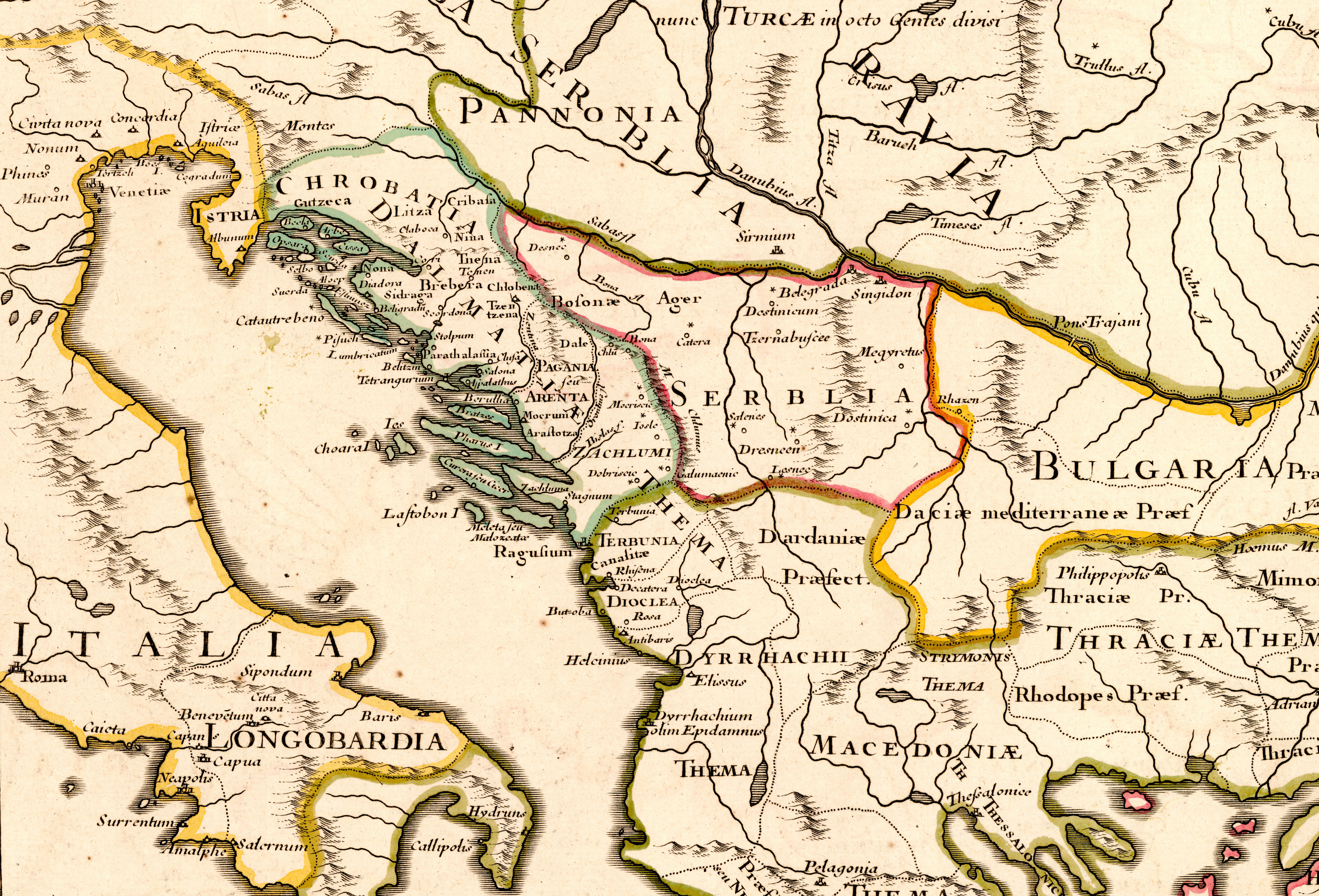
- Theme of Dyrrhachium (Thema Dyrrhachii) in the western Balkans on the southern Adriatic coast.
- Capital: Dyrrhachium
- Historical era: Middle Ages
  - Established: 9th century
  - Norman occupation: 1081
  - End of Norman occupation: 1084
  - Dissolution and capital surrendered to the Venetians: 1205
Preceded by
| Epirus Nova |
Succeeded by
| Duchy of Durazzo (Republic of Venice) |
| Arbanon |
| Despotate of Epirus |
- Today part of: Albania
- Common languages: Medieval Greek (official); Old Albanian; Old Slavonic (minority); Latin (ecclesiastical)

The Theme of Dyrrhachium (Medieval Greek: θέμα Δυρραχίου; Albanian: Thema e Durrësit), also referred to at the time as provintia Dirrachii et Arbani, was a Byzantine military-civilian province (theme). It encompassed the Adriatic coastal regions of what is now Albania, among other areas.

Established in the 9th century and named after its capital, Dyrrhachium (modern-day Durrës), the theme was dissolved in 1205 following the fall of Constantinople to the Fourth Crusade. The former capital would subsequently come under Venetian control, leading to the establishment of the short-lived Duchy of Durazzo.

== History ==
=== Establishment ===
The exact date of the theme's establishment is unclear; a strategos of Dyrrhachium is attested in the Taktikon Uspensky of c. 842, but several seals of strategoi dating from the previous decades survive. J.B. Bury proposed its creation alongside the themes of the Peloponnese and Cephallenia in the early 9th century, with the historian Jadran Ferluga putting the date of its establishment in the reign of Emperor Nikephoros I (r. 802–811). Its boundaries are not very clear. To the north, it abutted the Theme of Dalmatia and the Serbian principality of Duklja, and the Theme of Nicopolis to the south. The theme covered the coast in between, but how far inland it extended is uncertain: according to Konstantin Jireček, it reached as far as Drivast (modern Drisht) and Pulati in the north, and Bellegrada (modern Berat) in the centre, and bordered the lands of the Upper Devoll and Ohrid in the south. During the Byzantine–Bulgarian wars of the late 10th and early 11th centuries, the city seems to have been autonomous or at times under Bulgarian suzerainty.

=== 11th to 12th century ===
From the mid-11th century on, its governor held the title of doux or katepano. In 1040–1041, the troops of the theme, under their leader Tihomir, rebelled and joined the revolt of Peter Delyan.

During the late 11th and the 12th centuries, the city of Dyrrhachium and its province were of great importance to the Byzantine Empire. The city was the main point of entry for trade but also for invaders from Italy, and was ideally placed to control the actions of the Slavic rulers of the western Balkans. Thus the doux of Dyrrhachium became the senior-most Byzantine authority throughout the western Balkan provinces. Two successive governors, Nikephoros Bryennios the Elder and Nikephoros Basilakes, used this post as a launchpad for their imperial ambitions in the late 1070s. The region also played a crucial role in the Byzantine–Norman Wars, being occupied by the Normans in 1081–1084. After its recovery, Emperor Alexios I Komnenos entrusted the command of the theme to some of his closest relatives.

Around 1190, the Principality of Arbanon, centered in Krujë, was ruled by Progon, followed by his sons, Gjin and Dhimitër. Although it was virtually self-governing, the principality also remained dependent on the Byzantine Empire, as indicated by Progon’s title of archon. Due to its predominantly Albanian ethnic character, the theme was referred to in the Partitio Romaniae as provintia Dirrachii et Arbani, highlighting two main centers of Albanian settlement within the empire: Arbanon-Raban and Devol. Other areas within or in close proximity of the theme, such as the coastal regions of Epirus, were also largely inhabited by Albanians. In addition, Albanians were the principal inhabitants of the mountainous regions above the eastern shore of Lake Shkodër, while the central regions of what is now modern Albania around the Devol river, were also predominantly inhabited by Albanians. Likewise, the region of ancient Dardania (modern Kosovo), accessible via the Drin river system, had strong Albanian presence during this period.

According to the same Partitio Romaniae, the regions of Vagenetia and Glavinitsa, designated as chartoularaton, were also part of the province of Dyrrhachium.

=== Sack of Constantinople and dissolution of the theme ===
The city magnates (archontes) retained considerable influence and autonomy of action throughout, and it was they who in 1205, after the sack of Constantinople by the Fourth Crusade, surrendered the city to the Republic of Venice. Between July and August, the Venetian expedition en route to Constantinople, intended to install Doge Tommaso Morosini as Patriarch, took this opportunity and seized Dyrrachium. In addition to acquiring the dependencies of the city, Venice also gained control over other territories formerly part of the theme, specifically the regions of Glavinitsa and Vagenetia. However, the Venetians showed limited interest in maintaining control over these two territories, and by the end of the same year, they had fallen under the authority of the newly-established Despotate of Epirus, then ruled by Michael I Komnenos Doukas.

Arbanon, facing difficulties in the aftermath of Constantinople’s fall, chose to align itself with the Orthodox world and accepted suzerainty under Epirus, while at the same time preserving an alliance with Serbia. Under the rule of Dhimitër, Arbanon regarded Venice as its primarily threat.

== Religion ==
During the existence of the theme, Dyrrhachium was also the main ecclesiastical center in the region. As attested by the Notitiae Episcopatuum and other sources, local episcopal sees in the province were grouped under jurisdiction of the Metropolitanate of Dyrrhachium, that belonged to the Patriarchate of Constantinople.

Toward the end of the 12th century, the theme also experienced an increased Catholic influence, as the Church of Rome sought to expand its reach into the region of Albania, radiating from the archiepiscopal seat at Antivari.

== Economy ==
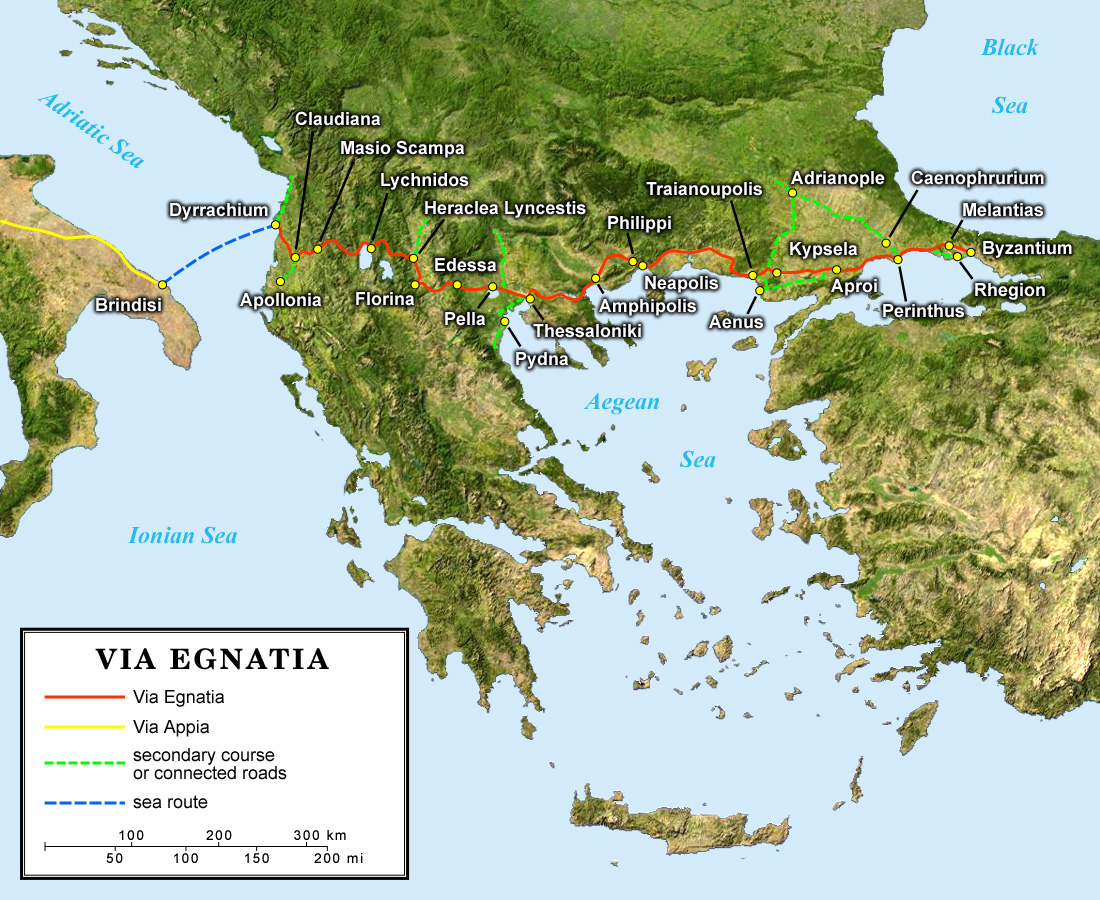
Route of the Via Egnatia.

Following the dissolution of the theme, Albania faced growing instability due to the rise of the Despotate of Epirus and the emergence of new Slavic powers in Bulgaria and Serbia. These developments had repercussions for the region. The major trans-Balkan trade routes crossing Albania, such as the Via Egnatia and the Via de Zenta, were disrupted by ongoing conflict. As a result, these routes lost their traditional role as conduits for eastern goods, triggering the decline of Epirote and Albanian ports, particularly Dyrrachium.

== List of known governors ==
- Unnamed strategos of Dyrrhachium during Leo Choirosphaktes' embassy to Bulgaria (896/904)
- Leo Rhabdouchos, protospatharios and strategos of Dyrrhachium in 917
- Constantine, imperial spatharios and strategos of Dyrrhachium (8th/9th-century seal)
- Niketas Pegonites, patrikios and strategos of Dyrrhachium until 1018
- Eustathios Daphnomeles, strategos of Dyrrhachium from 1018
- Basil Synadenos, strategos of Dyrrhachium until c. 1040
- Michael Dermokaites, strategos of Dyrrhachium from c. 1040
- Michael, patrikios and katepano of Dyrrhachium c. 1043
- Perenos, doux of Dyrrhachium c. 1064
- Michael Maurex, vestarches and katepano of Dyrrhachium (seal dated to the 1060s/early 1070s)
- Nikephoros Bryennios the Elder, doux of Dyrrhachium in 1075–1077
- Nikephoros Basilakes, protoproedros and doux of Dyrrhachium in 1078
- George Monomachatos, doux of Dyrrhachium in 1078–1081
- George Palaiologos, 1081
- John Doukas, doux of Dyrrhachium in 1085–1092
- John Komnenos, sebastos and doux of Dyrrhachium in 1092–1106
- Alexios Komnenos, 1106 – after 1108
- Pirogordus [Pyrrogeorgios?], doux of Dyrrhachium early in the reign of John II Komnenos and George I of Duklja
- Alexios Kontostephanos, doux of Dyrrhachium in the second quarter of the 12th century, during the reign of John II Komnenos and George I of Duklja
- Alexios Bryennios, doux of Dyrrhachium and Ohrid, probably sometime between 1148 and 1156
- Alexios Doukas, mid-12th century
- Constantine Doukas, c. 1171
- Unnamed doux of Dyrrhachium in 1203

== Sources ==
- Angold, Michael (1997). The Byzantine Empire, 1025–1204: A Political History (Second ed.). London and New York: Longman. ISBN 0-582-29468-1.
- Dragojlović, Dragoljub (1990). "Dyrrachium et les Évéchés de Doclea jusqu'a la fondation de l'Archevéche de Bar". Balcanica. 21: 201–209.
- Darrouzès, Jean, ed. (1981). Notitiae Episcopatuum Ecclesiae Constantinopolitanae. Paris: Institut français d'études byzantines.
- Ducellier, Alain (1981). La façade maritime de l'Albanie au Moyen Age. Durazzo et Valona du ΧIe au XVe siècle [The Albanian Seaboard in the Middle Ages. Durazzo and Valona from the 11th to the 15th Century] (in French). Thessaloniki: Institute for Balkan Studies.
- Ducellier, Alain (1999), "Albania, Serbia and Bulgaria", in Abulafia, David (ed.), The New Cambridge Medieval History, Volume V: c. 1198-c. 1300, Cambridge University Press, pp. 779–795, ISBN 0-521-36289-X
- Ferluga, Jadran (1964). "Sur la date de la création du thème de Dyrrachium". Actes du XIIe Congrès international d'études byzantines. Beograd: Naučno delo. pp. 83–92.
- Kazhdan, Alexander, ed. (1991). The Oxford Dictionary of Byzantium. Oxford and New York: Oxford University Press. ISBN 0-19-504652-8.
- Moravcsik, Gyula, ed. (1967) [1949]. Constantine Porphyrogenitus: De Administrando Imperio (2. ed.). Washington: Dumbarton Oaks Center for Byzantine Studies.
- Nesbitt, John; Oikonomides, Nicolas, eds. (1991). Catalogue of Byzantine Seals at Dumbarton Oaks and in the Fogg Museum of Art, Volume 1: Italy, North of the Balkans, North of the Black Sea. Vol. 1. Washington, DC: Dumbarton Oaks Research Library and Collection. ISBN 0-88402-194-7.
- Pertusi, A. (1952). Constantino Porfirogenito: De Thematibus (in Italian). Rome: Biblioteca Apostolica Vaticana.
- Stephenson, Paul (2004). Byzantium's Balkan Frontier: A Political Study of the Northern Balkans, 900–1204. Cambridge: Cambridge University Press. ISBN 0-521-77017-3.
- Zakythinos, Dionysios (1941). "Μελέται περὶ τῆς διοικητικῆς διαιρέσεως καὶ τῆς ἐπαρχιακῆς διοικήσεως ἐν τῷ Βυζαντινῷ κράτει" [Studies on the administrative division and provincial administration in the Byzantine state]. Ἐπετηρίς Ἐταιρείας Βυζαντινῶν Σπουδῶν (in Greek). 17: 208–274. hdl:11615/19494.
- Soustal, Peter; Koder, Johannes (1981). Tabula Imperii Byzantini, Band 3: Nikopolis und Kephallēnia (in German). Vienna: Verlag der Österreichischen Akademie der Wissenschaften. ISBN 978-3-7001-0399-8.
