= Revue des études byzantines =

- Discipline: Classical and oriental studies
- Language: English, French, German, Italian, Spanish
- Edited by: Olivier Delouis

Publication details
- Former names: Échos d'Orient, Études byzantines
- History: 1897–present
- Publisher: Peeters on behalf of the Institut français d'études byzantines (France)
- Frequency: Annually

Standard abbreviations
- ISO 4: Rev. Études Byz.

Indexing
- ISSN: 0771-3347 (print); 0771-3444 (web)
- OCLC no.: 781579014

Links
- Journal homepage; Online access; Online archive

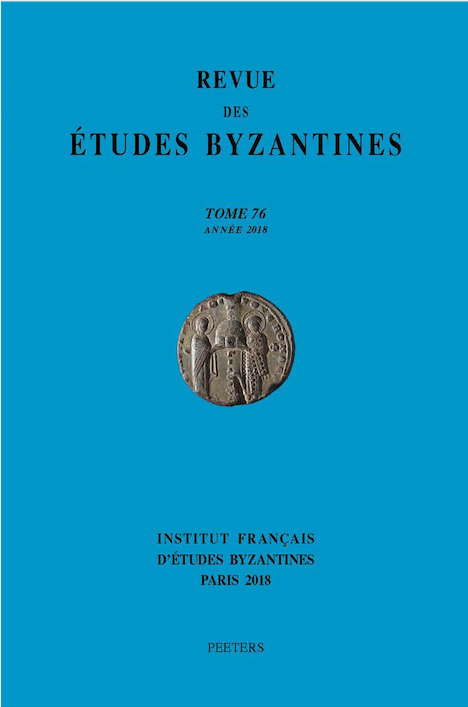
REB 76, 2018

The Revue des études byzantines is an annual peer-reviewed academic journal covering the study of Greek Christianity and especially Byzantine civilization. It was established in 1897 as Échos d'Orient, renamed Études byzantines in 1942 (with volume numbering restarting at 1), and obtaining its current title in 1946. The journal is published by Peeters on behalf of the Institut français d'études byzantines (Paris) and the editor-in-chief is Olivier Delouis.

== Abstracting and indexing ==
The journal is abstracted and indexed in:

- L'Année Philologique
- ATLA Religion Database
- Bibliography of the History of Art
- International Bibliography of Periodical Literature on the Humanities and Social Sciences
- Index Islamicus
- New Testament Abstracts
- Scopus
