= Abydikos =

Abydikos (Medieval Greek: ἀβυδικός) was a Byzantine official charged with overseeing maritime traffic.

The term most likely derives from the city of Abydos on the Hellespont, and evidently originally referred to an official responsible for overseeing maritime traffic through the straits there. Helene Ahrweiler suggested that he was the successor of the archon or komes "of the Straits", attested in Late Antiquity; scholars debate whether the office is the same as the "paraphylax of Abydos", which often occurs on seals. Eventually the term was more broadly applied to all officials with similar duties, and abydikoi are attested in Thessalonica, Amisus, Chrepos, and Euripus.

The abydikos was a military official, equivalent to the rank of komes, in the Byzantine navy. The office was often combined with the post of kommerkiarios, a fiscal office responsible for inspecting and taxing commerce. The office survived until the 11th century.

== Sources ==
- Ahrweiler, Hélène (1961). "Fonctionnaires et bureaux maritimes à Byzance". Revue des études byzantines. 19: 239–252. doi:10.3406/rebyz.1961.1259.
- Kazhdan, Alexander, ed. (1991). The Oxford Dictionary of Byzantium. Oxford and New York: Oxford University Press. ISBN 0-19-504652-8.
