= Eumathios Philokales =

Eumathios Philokales (Greek: Εὐμάθιος ὁ Φιλοκάλης) was a high-ranking Byzantine military leader and administrator during the reign of Emperor Alexios I Komnenos (r. 1081–1118), most notably as governor of Cyprus for twenty years, from 1093 to c. 1112. He also served as governor of southern Greece, ambassador to Hungary and megas doux (commander-in-chief of the Byzantine navy).

== History ==
Philokales's career is known both through his mention in the Alexiad and through his surviving seals of office. These trace his ascent from a protospatharios epi tou Chrysotriklinou to judge of the joint themes of Hellas and the Peloponnese, and eventually, sometime around 1090, to praetor of the latter. Around the same time, he was sent by Emperor Alexios to Hungary to arrange matters relating to the marriage of Alexios's son and heir, John II Komnenos, to Irene of Hungary.

In 1093, Alexios appointed Philokales as stratopedarches and governor of Cyprus following the suppression of the revolt of the island's previous governor, Rhapsomates. Given the island's strategic location, it was an appointment that indicated both Philokales's prominence in the imperial hierarchy and the Emperor's confidence in his ability. Indeed, in the Alexiad, Alexios's daughter Anna Komnene praises his intelligence and devotion to his duty. Philokales remained in Cyprus as governor for about 20 years, with the exception of a short period in 1109–1110. In contrast to the praise he receives from Anna Komnene and the 13th-century scholar Theodore Skoutariotes, local Cypriot sources of ecclesiastic origin portray him as a cruel and pitiless official and name him a wolf or a disciple of the devil, because of his imposition of heavy taxes on the island's population. In 1099, Philokales repelled Pisan raiders from Cyprus. From his position he also played a role in the affairs of the Crusader states, providing the link between Alexios and Raymond IV, Count of Toulouse, an imperial ally. This was the case in 1102, when Philokales sent supplies and equipment to Raymond during his siege of Tripoli.

In 1109, Philokales travelled to Constantinople, where he requested to be transferred to the governorship of Attaleia. Despite his inexperience in military matters, Emperor Alexios granted his request, and gave Philokales troops. Philokales landed with his army at Abydos and proceeded to move over land through western Asia Minor to take up his post. On his way, he rebuilt and repopulated the city of Adramyttion, destroyed by Tzachas years before. In the region of Lampe his troops inflicted a heavy defeat on the local Turks, and then moved on to Philadelphia. Anticipating a retaliatory attack, Philokales repaired the city's walls, and placed many scouts about. In this way, the city was prepared when the Turks of Cappadocia, under a certain Asan, appeared before the walls. Asan therefore did not assail the city, but divided and sent his troops to raid and plunder westwards. Philokales dispatched his own army after them. The Byzantines first pursued the Turkish division, 10,000 strong according to the Alexiad, that had moved towards Kelbianos and routed it in a surprise attack at dawn. Then Philokales's troops moved against the raiders who had moved towards Nymphaion and Smyrna and defeated them near the Meander River.

Little is known of Philokales after that. In 1111/1112, during Manuel Boutoumites's embassy to the Kingdom of Jerusalem, he was back in his post as governor of Cyprus. In an act dating to 1118, he is noted as holding the office of megas doux. A few verses also testify to his elevation to the ranks of magistros and kouropalates and, by 1118, to the exalted dignity of pansebastos sebastos.

== Sources ==
- Dawes, Elizabeth A., ed. (1928). The Alexiad. London: Routledge & Kegan Paul.
- Guilland, Rodolphe (1967). Recherches sur les institutions byzantines [Studies on the Byzantine Institutions]. Berliner byzantinische Arbeiten 35 (in French). Vol. 1. Berlin and Amsterdam: Akademie-Verlag & Adolf M. Hakkert. OCLC 878894516.
- Oikonomidis, N. (1980). "Οι αυθένται των Κρητών το 1118" [The lords of the Cretans in 1118]. Πεπραγμένα του Δ' Διεθνούς Κρητολογικού Συνεδρίου, Ηράκλειο, 29 Αυγούστου - 3 Δεκεμβρίου 1976. Τόμος Β′ Βυζαντινοί και μέσοι χρόνοι (in Greek). Athens: University of Crete. pp. 308–317.
- Skoulatos, Basile (1980). Les personnages byzantins de l'Alexiade: Analyse prosopographique et synthèse [The Byzantine Personalities of the Alexiad: Prosopographical Analysis and Synthesis] (in French). Louvain-la-Neuve and Louvain: Bureau du Recueil Collège Érasme and Éditions Nauwelaerts. OCLC 8468871.
