= Emirate of Smyrna =

Emirate of Smyrna is a historiographic term that can refer to:

- the short-lived lordship established by the Turkish warlord Tzachas in 1088, and was reconquered by the Byzantines in 1097
- the later Turkish Aydınid emirate, that held Smyrna for much of its existence
