= John Doukas (megas doux) =

Byzantine admiral

- Born: c. 1064
- Died: before 1136
- Relatives: Michael Doukas (brother); Irene Doukaina (sister)
- Military career
- Allegiance: Byzantine Empire
- Rank: megas doux
- Conflicts: Byzantine–Seljuk Wars

John Doukas (Greek: Ἰωάννης Δούκας, c. 1064 – before 1137) was a member of the Doukas family, a relative of Byzantine emperor Alexios I Komnenos (r. 1081–1118) and a senior military figure of his reign. As governor of Dyrrhachium, he secured the imperial possessions in the western Balkans against the Serbs. Appointed megas doux, he scoured the Aegean of the fleets of the Turkish emir Tzachas, suppressed rebellions in Crete and Cyprus, and then recovered much of the western coast of Anatolia for Byzantium.

== Biography ==
=== Early life ===
John Doukas was born c. 1064, the second son of the domestikos ton scholon Andronikos Doukas, son of the Caesar John Doukas, and his wife, Maria of Bulgaria, the granddaughter of Ivan Vladislav (r. 1015–1018), the last ruler of the First Bulgarian Empire. John was thus the brother-in-law of Alexios I Komnenos, who had married his sister Irene Doukaina. In 1074, during the rebellion of the Norman mercenary Roussel de Bailleul, John, along with his elder brother Michael, was at his grandfather the Caesar's estates in Bithynia. Roussel demanded that the Caesar give up the two as hostages in return for releasing their wounded father, whom he held captive. The elder Doukas agreed, and the two were imprisoned by Roussel; Michael managed to escape, but the younger John remained with Roussel until the latter's defeat and capture by the Turks of Artuk later in the year.

After his father died in 1077, John remained in his grandfather's estates in Thrace, and was raised by him. It was there that he learned of the rebellion of Alexios Komnenos against Nikephoros III Botaneiates (r. 1078–1081) in 1081, and it was he who informed the Caesar of it. Together, they departed and joined Alexios's forces at Schiza, where the latter was officially proclaimed emperor.

=== Governor of Dyrrhachium ===
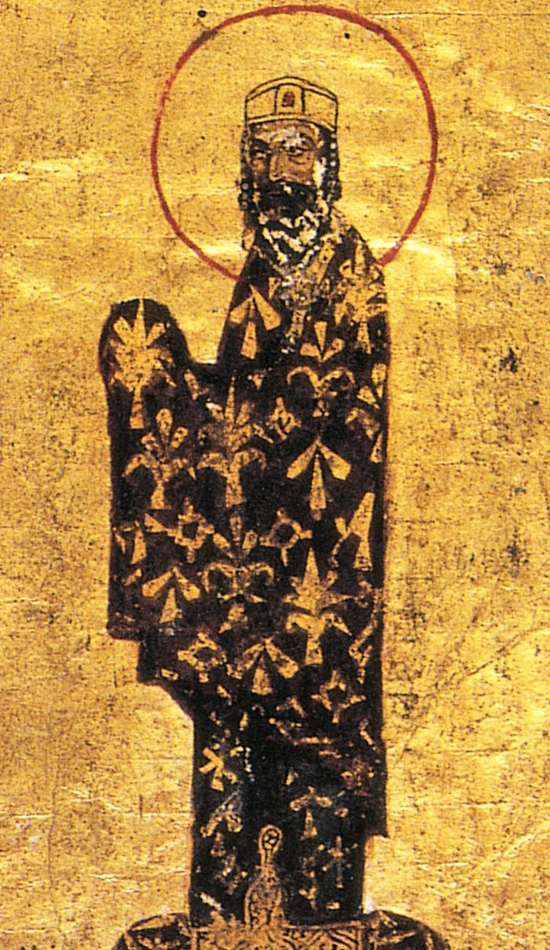
Miniature of the Emperor Alexios I Komnenos

In 1085, when Alexios recovered the strategically important Adriatic port city of Dyrrhachium from the Italo-Normans who had occupied it, John Doukas was installed as the military governor (doux) of the local province. John remained there until 1092, when he was replaced by John Komnenos, the son of the emperor's brother, the sebastokrator Isaac. His tenure was apparently very successful. John repelled the Serbian incursions from Duklja and inner Serbia, and even, according to Anna Komnene, captured the Dukljan king Constantine Bodin (r. 1081–1101), before restoring him to power as a client of the Byzantine Empire. Thus John managed to restore order in the region of Albania and Dalmatia, which had suffered greatly during the Byzantine–Norman wars of the previous years. Surviving correspondence from the archbishop Theophylact of Ohrid is a testimony to his success; after John's departure from the post, Theophylact expressed nostalgia for the time of his governorship and asked for his advice.

=== Appointment as megas doux and campaigns against the Turks ===
After being recalled to Constantinople in 1092, John was appointed to the post of megas doux, i.e. commander-in-chief of the Byzantine navy. Although he is the first known megas doux and hence usually credited as the first to hold the post, there is evidence of its existence already in late 1085, although its holder is not named. As megas doux, John was tasked with countering the naval threat posed by the Turkish emir Tzachas of Smyrna. Tzachas, formerly a Byzantine vassal, had built a fleet of his own and had seized several Aegean islands, raided others, and even had himself proclaimed basileus (emperor). John set forth to take back the island of Lesbos. His troops marched along the Anatolian coast to the point opposite the island, whence they crossed over. The fleet, which under Constantine Dalassenos had already recovered Chios, was to meet him there. The combined Byzantine force laid siege to the capital of Lesbos, Mytilene, for three months, when Tzachas offered to cede the island in exchange for safe passage back to Smyrna. John agreed, but as the Turks set sail, Dalassenos, who with his ships had just arrived, attacked them. Tzachas managed to escape, but most of his fleet was captured or sunk. After this victory, John Doukas reinforced the defences of Mytilene and then led his fleet to recover the islands Tzachas had conquered, before returning to Constantinople.

Upon his return to Constantinople, he was tasked (late 1092/early 1093), along with Manuel Boutoumites, with the suppression of the revolts in Crete by Karykes and in Cyprus by Rhapsomates. The rebellion of Karykes was subdued easily, as the news of the imperial fleet's approach caused a counter-coup that overthrew him. At Cyprus, Rhapsomates's initial resistance was overcome, and he himself was captured soon after. Eumathios Philokales was installed as the island's new governor, and the fleet returned to Constantinople. In 1094, he participated in the Council of Blachernae that condemned Leo of Chalcedon.

In 1097, after the surrender of Nicaea to the Byzantines, Alexios named John as commander-in-chief of the Byzantine army in Anatolia, and tasked with recovering the Aegean littoral from the Turks. To avoid conflict and facilitate negotiations, he was given custody of the wife of the Seljuk sultan of Rûm Kilij Arslan I (r. 1092–1107) and the daughter of Tzachas, who had been captured at Nicaea. John gave command of the fleet to Kaspax, and marched against Smyrna. After a short siege, Tzachas agreed to surrender the city in exchange for his safe departure and guarantees of the inhabitants' safety. The megas doux readily accepted and took possession of the city, naming Kaspax as its governor. Even before Kaspax could assume his duties however, he was murdered by a Muslim, and the enraged sailors of the fleet massacred the people of the city. John Doukas was unable to restrain them, and restored order only after the massacre had run its course. He then left the experienced general Hyaleas behind as doux of the city along with the entire fleet to secure the city, and continued his campaign. From Smyrna, John marched south to Ephesus. There, he defeated the Turkish garrison after a long battle, and took 2,000 captives, who were resettled in the Aegean islands. Petzeas was installed as doux of Ephesus, and John with his army turned inland. He took the cities of Sardeis and Philadelphia, which he entrusted to Michael Kekaumenos, and reached Laodicea, which opened its gates to him. From there, he marched to the fortresses of Choma and Lampe, installing Eustathios Kamytzes as governor, and reached Polybotos, where most of the Turks who had survived at Ephesus had fled. Having caught them by surprise, Doukas's army defeated them and took much booty.

=== Later life ===
John Doukas is not mentioned in the Alexiad after his 1097 campaign. It is, however, known from monastic documents that at some point he retired to a monastery and assumed the monastic name Antony. The date of his death is also not known, but in a typikon dated to 1110–1116 he is mentioned as being alive, while in another typikon of 1136, he is explicitly mentioned as having died.

== Sources ==
- Cheynet, Jean-Claude (2008). "La place de la Serbie dans la diplomatie byzantine à la fin du XIe siècle" [The Position of Serbia in Byzantine Diplomacy at the End of the 11th Century] (PDF). Recueil des travaux de l'Institut d'études byzantines (in French). XLV. doi:10.2298/ZRVI0845089C.
- Curta, Florin (2006). Southeastern Europe in the Middle Ages, 500–1250. Cambridge: Cambridge University Press. ISBN 978-0-521-81539-0.
- Dawes, Elizabeth A., ed. (1928). The Alexiad. London: Routledge & Kegan Paul.
- Kazhdan, Alexander, ed. (1991). The Oxford Dictionary of Byzantium. Oxford and New York: Oxford University Press. ISBN 0-19-504652-8.
- Gautier, Paul (1977). "Défection et soumission de la Crète sous Alexis Ier Comnène" [Defection and Submission of Crete under Alexios I Komnenos]. Revue des études byzantines (in French). 35: 215–227. doi:10.3406/rebyz.1977.2071.
- Polemis, Demetrios I. (1968). The Doukai: A Contribution to Byzantine Prosopography. London: The Athlone Press.
- Skoulatos, Basile (1980). Les personnages byzantins de l'Alexiade: Analyse prosopographique et synthèse [The Byzantine Personalities of the Alexiad: Prosopographical Analysis and Synthesis] (in French). Louvain-la-Neuve and Louvain: Bureau du Recueil Collège Érasme and Éditions Nauwelaerts.

Vacant Norman occupation Title last held by George Palaiologos	Doux of Dyrrhachium; 1085–1092	Succeeded by John Komnenos
New title	Megas doux of the Byzantine navy 1092 – after 1097	Succeeded by Landulf
