= Manuel Boutoumites =

11th century AD Byzantine general and diplomat

- Born: Mid-11th century
- Died: After 1112
- Military career
- Allegiance: Byzantine Empire
- Conflicts: Siege of Nicaea, Byzantine–Seljuk Wars, Byzantine–Latin Wars

Manuel Boutoumites or Butumites (Greek: Μανουὴλ Βουτουμίτης, fl. 1086–1112) was a leading Byzantine general and diplomat during the reign of Emperor Alexios I Komnenos (r. 1081–1118), and one of the Emperor's most trusted aides. He was instrumental in the Byzantine recovery of Nicaea from the Seljuk Turks, in the reconquest of Cilicia, and acted as the emperor's envoy in several missions to Crusader princes.

== Early campaigns against the Seljuks ==
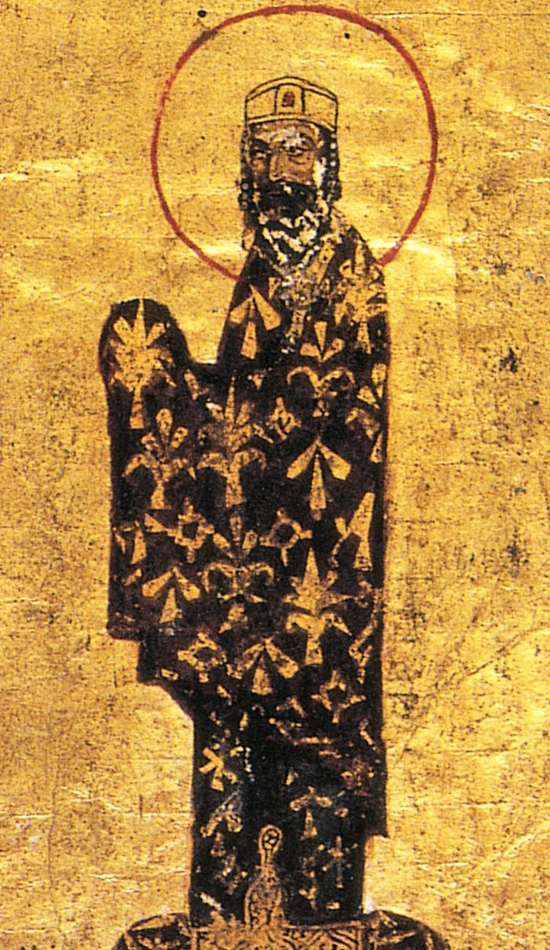
Miniature of the Emperor Alexios I Komnenos (r. 1081–1118).

Boutoumites appears in Anna Komnene's Alexiad in 1086, when he was appointed as the doux of the Byzantine fleet by Alexios, and sent against Abu'l Qasim, the semi-independent Seljuk Turkish governor of Nicaea. Abu'l Qasim was preparing to launch a fleet into the Sea of Marmara to challenge the Byzantine navy. Alexios, determined to prevent this, sent against him Boutoumites with the fleet, while Tatikios would move against his base by land. The two generals successfully destroyed the Seljuk fleet and forced Abu'l Qasim to withdraw to Nicaea, whence he concluded a truce with Byzantium.

Later, in 1092, after Alexios's megas doux, John Doukas, defeated the emir Tzachas of Smyrna, Boutoumites, along with Alexander Euphorbenos, were given as hostages to the emir to guarantee his peaceful evacuation of the island of Lesbos. Soon after, Doukas and Boutoumites were sent against the rebellions of Karykes at Crete and Rhapsomates at Cyprus. After subduing Karykes's revolt, they headed to Cyprus, where Kyrenia fell quickly. Rhapsomates came out to meet them and occupied the heights above the city, but Boutoumites enticed many of his men to desert, and the rebel had to flee the battle. Boutoumites pursued and caught up with him at the church of the Holy Cross, where the rebel had sought refuge. Promising to spare his life, he captured him and brought him back to Doukas. According to tradition, while in Cyprus, he founded the Kykkos Monastery there.

== First Crusade and the Siege of Nicaea ==
Boutoumites was highly regarded and trusted by Alexios; Anna Komnene calls him "Alexios' sole confidant". Hence he played an important role in the delicate dealings with the First Crusade: in 1096, Boutoumites was sent to escort the ship-wrecked Hugh of Vermandois from Dyrrhachium to Constantinople, and in 1097, he was dispatched, at the head of a small detachment, to accompany the Crusader army as it marched against the Turks in Anatolia.

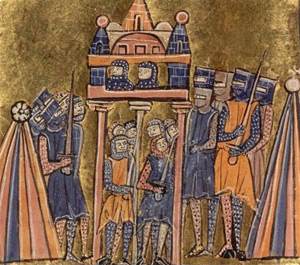
The siege of Nicaea, from a Western European illuminated manuscript.

The first great obstacle on the Crusaders' path was Nicaea, the Seljuk capital, prompting the Siege of Nicaea in 1097. Boutoumites had been instructed by Alexios to secure the surrender of the city to imperial forces, and not to the Crusaders. Already from the outset of the siege, Boutoumites, through numerous letters, tried to entice the Seljuks to surrender to him, whether through promises of amnesty or threats of a wholesale massacre should the Crusaders capture the city by force. The Turks had entered negotiations, allowing Boutoumites to enter the city. Two days later, at the news of the approach of a relief force under Sultan Kilij Arslan I (r. 1092–1107), they forced him to leave. After the relief force was defeated by the Crusaders, however, and as an imperial squadron under Boutoumites gained control of the city's open supply route through the Ascanian Lake and 2,000 Byzantines under Tatikios joined the Crusaders in the siege, the city's inhabitants determined to accept Alexios's terms: Boutoumites entered Nicaea and showed them the Byzantine emperor's chrysobull, offering generous terms and honours for the Sultan's wife and sister, who were in the city. Boutoumites, however, kept the deal a secret, and arranged with Tatikios for a renewed assault by the Crusaders and Tatikios's men, in which the city would ostensibly be captured by the Byzantines. The ruse worked: the day of the final assault was set for June 19, but when the assault began at dawn, the Byzantines, allowed in through the lake-ward gates, raised their standards on the battlements, leaving the Crusaders outside.

Although by and large the Crusaders accepted the outcome, the event soured relations. The Crusader leaders felt cheated at having been left out of the loop after the casualties they suffered in defeating the Turkish relief force, but the resentment was greater among the Crusader rank and file, who were deprived of the prospect of plunder and outraged at the Byzantines' respectful treatment of the Muslim captives. In the aftermath of the city's fall, Boutoumites was named by Alexios as doux of Nicaea. He was successful both in keeping the Crusader rank and file, still eager for pillage, in check – they were not allowed into the city except in groups of ten – and in soothing their leaders through gifts and securing their pledge of allegiance to Alexios. He also persuaded some of the Crusaders to enroll in the Byzantine army. They were then employed in garrisoning Nicaea and repairing its walls.

== Envoy and general against Bohemund and Tancred ==
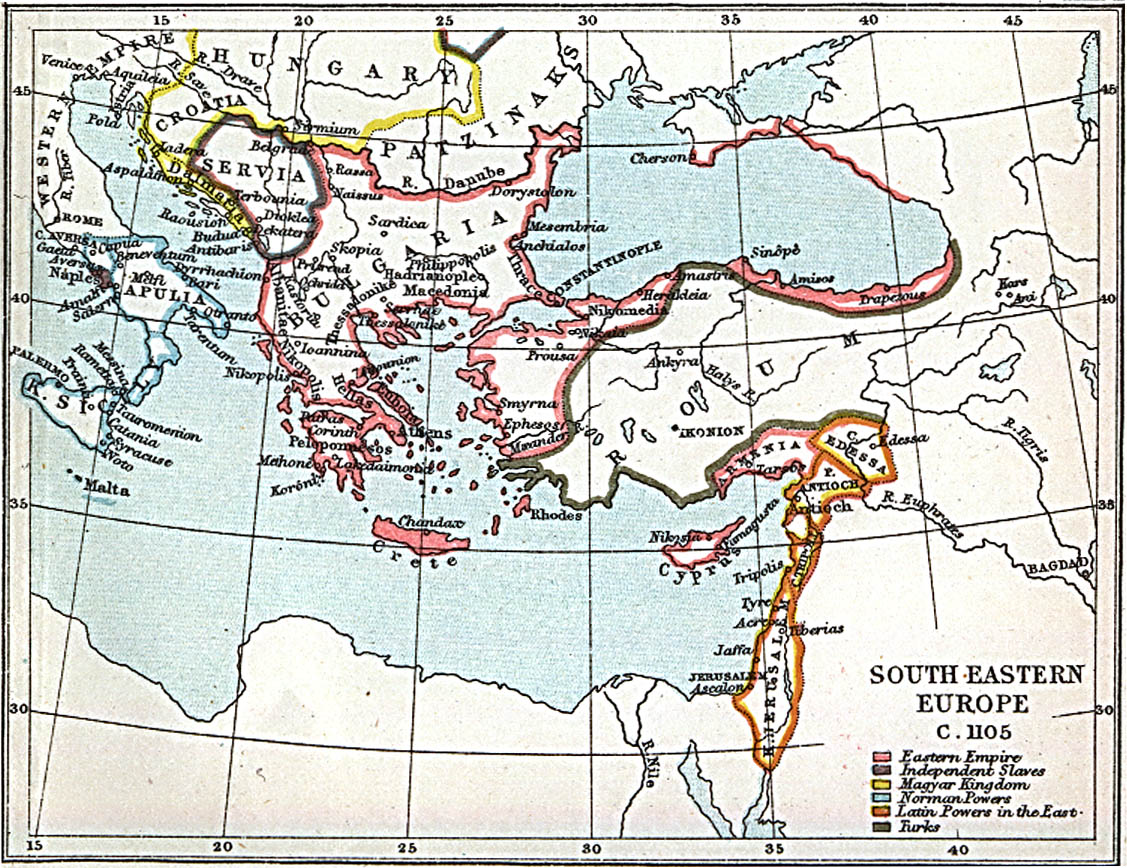
The Byzantine Empire and the Eastern Mediterranean circa 1105.

In 1099, he was sent by the Byzantine commanders at Cyprus as a peace envoy to Bohemond I of Antioch, but he was detained by him for a fortnight before being released, and no negotiations were begun. A few years later (c. 1103), Boutoumites was placed at the head of a large army sent to secure Cilicia against Bohemund. After taking Attaleia, the Byzantines took Maraş and its surrounding region. Boutoumites left behind a large force under Monastras to garrison the province, and returned to Constantinople.

In 1111/12, he was sent as an envoy to the Latin Kingdom of Jerusalem to secure aid against Tancred, Bohemond's regent at Antioch, who refused to comply with the Treaty of Devol of 1108, which turned Antioch into a Byzantine vassal state. From Cyprus, Boutoumites first sailed to Tripoli. According to the Alexiad, the local count, Bertrand of Toulouse, readily assented to assist the imperial forces against Tancred, and even to come and pay homage to Alexios when he would arrive to besiege Antioch. Next the Byzantine envoys set out to meet with the King of Jerusalem, Baldwin I, who was besieging Tyre. Boutoumites tried to persuade Baldwin by offering a substantial reward in gold, and making various exaggerated statements, including that Alexios was supposedly already on his way and had reached Seleucia. Baldwin, however, advised of the untruth of Boutoumites's claims, lost confidence in him. He feigned willingness to attack Tancred provided that he received the promised subsidies beforehand. Boutoumites, however, perceived the king's intentions, and refused to do so. Thus the mission ended in failure, and Boutoumites left Jerusalem, returning to Constantinople via Tripoli.

== Sources ==
- Brand, Charles M. (1991). "Bohemund". In Kazhdan, Alexander (ed.). The Oxford Dictionary of Byzantium. Oxford and New York: Oxford University Press. pp. 301–302. ISBN 0-19-504652-8.
- Brand, Charles M. (1991). "Tancred". In Kazhdan, Alexander (ed.). The Oxford Dictionary of Byzantium. Oxford and New York: Oxford University Press. p. 2009. ISBN 0-19-504652-8.
- Finck, Harold S. (1969) [1955]. "The Foundation of the Latin States, 1099-1118". In Setton, Kenneth M.; Baldwin, Marshall W. (eds.). A History of the Crusades, Volume I: The First Hundred Years. Vol. 1 (Second ed.). Madison, Milwaukee, and London: University of Wisconsin Press. pp. 368–409. ISBN 0-299-04834-9.
- Kazhdan, Alexander (1991). "Boutoumites". In Kazhdan, Alexander (ed.). The Oxford Dictionary of Byzantium. Oxford and New York: Oxford University Press. pp. 318–319. ISBN 0-19-504652-8.
- Kazhdan, Alexander (1991). "Devol". In Kazhdan, Alexander (ed.). The Oxford Dictionary of Byzantium. Oxford and New York: Oxford University Press. pp. 616–617. ISBN 0-19-504652-8.
- Runciman, Steven (1969) [1955]. "The First Crusade: Constantinople to Antioch". In Setton, Kenneth M.; Baldwin, Marshall W. (eds.). A History of the Crusades, Volume I: The First Hundred Years. Vol. 1 (Second ed.). Madison, Milwaukee, and London: University of Wisconsin Press. pp. 280–307. ISBN 0-299-04834-9.
- Runciman, Steven (1987) [1951]. A History of the Crusades, Volume I: The First Crusade and the Foundation of the Kingdom of Jerusalem. Vol. 1. Cambridge: Cambridge University Press. ISBN 978-0-521-34770-9.
- Sewter, E. R. A., ed. (2003) [1969]. The Alexiad. London and New York: Penguin Classics. ISBN 978-0-14-044958-7.
- Skoulatos, Basile (1980). Les personnages byzantins de l'Alexiade: Analyse prosopographique et synthèse [The Byzantine Personalities of the Alexiad: Prosopographical Analysis and Synthesis] (in French). Louvain-la-Neuve and Louvain: Bureau du Recueil Collège Érasme and Éditions Nauwelaerts.
