= Rhapsomates =

11th century Byzantine official and rebel

Rhapsomates (or Rapsomates; Greek: Ῥαψομάτης) was a Byzantine official who led a revolt in the Theme of Cyprus in the early 1090s. Nothing is known about his life prior to the revolt apart from the fact that he served as an official in the region. The motivation behind its outbreak remains a matter of conjecture.

Rhapsomates maintained control of the island for approximately three years. He was defeated by the megas doux John Doukas and was taken captive to Constantinople. His life was probably spared. After the suppression of the rising, Emperor Alexios I Komnenos augmented Cyprus's garrison and appointed new officials to rule over it.

== Background ==
No historical record survives of Rhapsomates's origins or his life prior to the revolt. Rhapsomates, meaning 'stitched eyes', is the name of an obscure family. The family name originates in 11th century Asia Minor and refers to the nickname of Turkic people who migrated to the area. The given name of the rebel leader is not known. A Basil Rhapsomates is known from a seal dated to the 12th century. It is just possible that this Basil was the same person as the rebel leader. An ergasterion (workshop) belonging to a John Rhapsomates was located in Galata, the Genoese quarter of Constantinople, in the 12th century. The main narrative sources for his revolt are Anna Komnene and John Zonaras. British historian Roderick Beaton dismisses accounts of Rhapsomates's life as reality intertwined with folk tales.

Rhapsomates held office on Cyprus before the revolt, but which office is unknown. It does not appear to have been a military one, since he is described as having never held a sword or rode a horse. His lack of military prowess may have been purposefully exaggerated by Manuel Boutoumites who had served as doux in Cyprus during the 1080s. The two might have been friends and Boutoumites, acted in this manner to soften Rhapsomates's punishment after the revolt. He was most probably a krites (judge) or kourator (imperial estate manager). It is possible, but unlikely, that he was the catepan (military governor) of Cyprus. The absence of a catepan in the surviving narratives of the revolt is difficult to explain, but the office may have been temporarily vacant or the catepan may have been an early victim of the revolt.

== Revolt and suppression ==
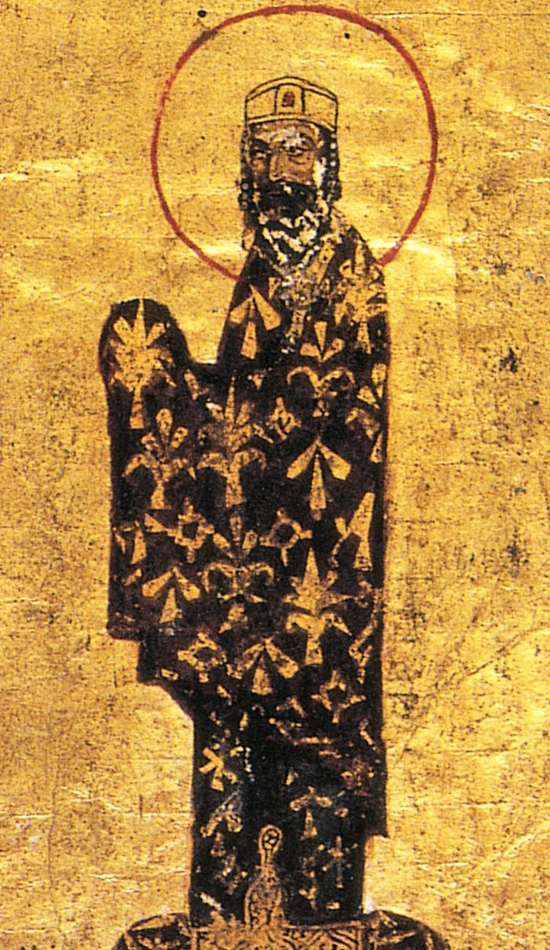
Miniature depicting emperor Alexios I Komnenos

The reasons behind the revolt are unknown. According to Cypriot historian Costas Kyrris the revolt was provoked by heavy taxation and frustration over pirate raids, but this theory is not supported by primary sources. Rhapsomates's revolt was contemporary with that of Karykes on Crete. Michael Glykas even confuses them. It broke out in late 1090 or very early 1091. In February or March 1091, John the Oxite delivered a scathing rebuke to the Emperor Alexios I Komnenos, during which he noted the outbreak of revolts in Crete and Cyprus. Both took place while the central government was occupied in wars with the Pechenegs in Europe and the Seljuk Turks of Emir Tzachas in Asia Minor.

Although the mere arrival of the fleet of John Doukas off Crete caused the revolt of Karykes to melt away, the megas doux faced much greater resistance on Cyprus. The island's military establishment supported Rhapsomates, including all or a large part of the tagma of the Immortals stationed there. The revolt did not affect church property as evidenced by the donation of a valuable codex by magistros Epiphanios Paschales to the monastery of Theotokos of Alypos in October 1091.

The continuation of the revolt led Doukas to land his troops on the island, in what would become a protracted campaign. Manuel Boutoumites was among Doukas's generals. The campaign began in the spring of 1093, with a swift capture of the port of Kyrenia. Rhapsomates massed his troops and departed Nicosia, establishing a camp on the heights overlooking Kyrenia. Instead of using the momentum in his favor he parleyed with Doukas. A number of rebel soldiers defected to the Byzantine army. Eventually Rhapsomates launched an assault on his opponents. During the course of the battle a unit of approximately 100 rebel lancers changed sides instead of charging the enemy. Rhapsomates then attempted to flee to Limassol, planning to sail for Syria. He hid in a sanctuary of the Holy Cross in a mountainous area (possibly Stavrovouni Monastery) where he was arrested by Boutoumites, who promised not to execute him. Anna Komnene does not record how long the resistance lasted before Rhapsomates was captured. Traditional estimates put the suppression of the revolt at early 1093, however it may have lasted until 1094.

== Aftermath ==
Rhapsomates and the Immortals involved in the rising were taken to Constantinople. Their units were disbanded and the soldiers were redistributed to other formations. Rhapsomates's life was probably spared. British historian Peter Frankopan connects Rhapsomates with Nikephoros Diogenes who was blinded around 1094 after a failed revolt, presumably then receiving the nickname stitched eyes.

In the aftermath of the revolt, Alexios I appointed Eumathios Philokales as governor with the title of stratopedarches and sent a large garrison to thwart any invasion attempts by Tzachas. Alexios endowed the governor with special taxing powers, suggesting that the revolt might have been directed at Alexios's fiscal policies. He also appointed a certain Kalliparios to fiscal (exisotes) and judicial (krites) office. A flurry of construction on the island in the 1090s may be linked to the crushing of Rhapsomates's revolt.

== Bibliography ==
- Cheynet, Jean-Claude (1996). Pouvoir et contestations à Byzance (963–1210) [Power and Contestations in Byzantium (963–1210)] (in French). Paris: Publications de la Sorbonne. ISBN 978-2-85944-840-0.
- Demosthenous, Anthoullis (2002). Η βυζαντινή Κύπρος (965 - 1191) [Byzantine Cyprus (965–1191)] (in Greek). Thessaloniki: Herodotos. ISBN 9789606887215.
- Frankopan, Peter (2004). "Challenges to Imperial Authority in Byzantium: Revolts on Crete and Cyprus at the End of the 11th C.". Byzantion. 74 (2): 382–402. JSTOR 44172968.
- Georgiou, Stavros (2008). "Eumathios Philokales as Stratopedarches of Cyprus (ca. 1092)". Byzantinoslavica. 66: 167–172. ISSN 0007-7712.
- Gregory, Timothy (1991). "Cyprus". In Kazhdan, Alexander (ed.). The Oxford Dictionary of Byzantium. Oxford and New York: Oxford University Press. ISBN 0-19-504652-8.
- Metcalf, Michael (2009). Byzantine Cyprus, 491–1191. Nicosia: Cyprus Research Centre. ISBN 9789963081158.
- Tsougarakis, Dimitris (1988). Byzantine Crete: From the 5th Century to the Venetian Conquest. Athens: Historical Publications St. D. Basilopoulos. ISBN 9789607100047.
- Wharton, Annabel Jane (1991). "Monuments of Cyprus". In Kazhdan, Alexander (ed.). The Oxford Dictionary of Byzantium. Oxford and New York: Oxford University Press. ISBN 0-19-504652-8.
