= John Xenos =

John Xenos (Greek: Ἰωάννης Ξένος; 970? – after 1027), also known as John the Hermit, was an itinerant ascetic, Christian saint and founder of churches and monasteries on Byzantine Crete. He wrote an autobiography in Greek, Bios kai politeia.

John's life is known primarily through his autobiography, which survives in a 15th-century manuscript now in the Bodleian Library and the manuscript known as the Codex Cisamensis, copied in Crete in 1703. The Codex Cisamensis also contains a copy of John's will and testament.

== Life ==
John was born to wealthy family at Siba, probably the modern village of Sivas on the Messara Plain. The scribe of the Codex Cisamensis places his birth in the year 970. For a time he travelled alone throughout western Crete, "from mountain to mountain" in his words. He founded his first church at Rethymno in obedience to a vision he received from the Cretan saints Eutychios and Eutychianos. It was the first of several churches he built in honour of these saints. After a vision of the Mother of God Antiphonetria, he built the mountaintop monastery of Myriokephala. This monastery still exists and some early 11th-century wall paintings are preserved.

After Myriokephala, he founded the churches of Saint George Doubrikas near Roustika and Saint George Opsaropiastes near Chromonastiri, both in the hills south of Rethymno. He usually left his churches in the care of a monk ordained as a priest. When he returned to Myriokephala after his foundations to Saint George, he found the monks in poor shape. He established a church dedicated to Saint Patapios as a dependency of Myriokephala with responsibility for overseeing its agricultural lands located at some distance from the monastery. In all, Myriokephala could support twelve monks.

After his foundations to Saint George, John travelled to Constantinople to obtain imperial privileges for his churches. The two preserved versions of his Bios differ in the details of his Constantinopolitan mission. The Codex Cisamensis states that the Emperor Romanos III (1028–1034) issued a chrysobull granting an annual subvention to Myriokephala and gifted John with a dozen sets of monastic vestments. The Patriarch Alexios Studites (1025–1043) issued a stauropegion exempting Myriokephala from ecclesiastical taxes and episcopal oversight. The Bodleian manuscript does not mention the patriarch and does not name Romanos III, but refers to "our orthodox emperors".

Returning from Constantinople, John shifted his activity northwest. He founded a church of the Mother of God at Koufos with agricultural land and a vineyard. He set up an oratory dedicated to Saint Paul near Aigialos and a sanctuary of Saint George in Nazogeraia. These places lay near the present-day village of Azogyres inland from Palaiochora. Seeking solitude, he continued west and settled in Kisamos. His autobiography records no more of his life, but tradition relates that he stayed for some time in the village of Spelia, where an oratory was dedicated to him. He is said to have been buried in the monastery of Gouverneto.

John's testament, which he drew up after his return from Constantinople, treats all of his ecclesiastical foundation as private property and as a unit. He places all his various foundations under the authority of Myriokephala. He was anxious to protect his churches from the charistikion, a new institution introduced by Basil II (976–1025) that allowed proprietary churches to be transferred by the government. For the protection of his churches, John relied on the chrysobull and the stauropegion.

== Writings ==
The Bios kai politeia is not a very informative biography, but it represents a revival of the autobiographical genre in Byzantium. Because, to support his churches, John acquired land, orchards and economic privileges, his Bios is also important as a source of information on agriculture and taxpaying in 11th-century Crete, helping to define terms like zeugarion and choraphion. Besides the Bios, some sermons on the Gospel of Matthew and some hymns (canons and stichera) have been attributed to John.

== Bibliography ==
- Fiaccadori, Gianfranco (2000). "Testament of John Xenos for the Monastery of the Mother of God Antiphonetria of Myriokephala on Crete". In John Philip Thomas; Angela Constantinides Hero (eds.). Byzantine Monastic Foundation Documents: A Complete Translation of the Surviving Founders' Typika and Testaments. Vol. 1. Dumbarton Oaks Research Library and Collection. pp. 143–147.
- Kazhdan, Alexander (1991). "Xenos, John". In Kazhdan, Alexander (ed.). The Oxford Dictionary of Byzantium. Oxford and New York: Oxford University Press. ISBN 0-19-504652-8.
- Oikonomou, Sophia (1999). The Life of loannes Xenos: Critical Edition and Commentary (PDF) (Ph.D. dissertation). University of London.
- Tsougarakis, Dimitris (1988). Byzantine Crete: From the 5th Century to the Venetian Conquest. Athens: Historical Publications St. D. Basilopoulos.
