= Battle of the Oinousses Islands (1090) =

Date	19 May 1090
Location	Off Oinousses, Aegean Sea
Result	Tzachas victory

Belligerents
Forces of Tzachas	Byzantine Empire

Commanders and leaders
Çaka Bey (Tzachas)	Niketas Kastamonites

Battle of the Oinousses Islands (Turkish: Koyun Adaları Muharebesi) was a medieval naval engagement in the Aegean Sea. The theatre of the battle was around Oinousses, a group of small islands between the island of Chios and Anatolia. The belligerents were the warlord Çaka Bey and the Byzantine Empire.

Tzachas was a Turkish seaman who founded a quasi-independent principality around Smyrna (modern İzmir) in the late 11th century. Although not a member of the Seljuk house, his daughter was married to the Seljuk Sultan Kılıç Arslan I. He founded a maritime principality around Smyrna and he frequently campaigned on the Byzantine islands in east Aegean sea.

After capturing the island of Lesbos, he planned to attack the island of Chios. There were 17 war ships and 33 clippers under his command. However upon learning about an approaching Byzantine fleet under the command of Niketas Kastamonites, he decided to fight. The battle on the 19 May 1090 continued until night. Tzachas was able to defeat the Byzantine fleet.

After the battle Tzachas annexed the islands of Chios and Samos.
