= Petzeas =

Petzeas (Greek: Πετζέας) was a Byzantine commander and provincial governor under Alexios I Komnenos.

He is only known from a few brief references in the Alexiad. In 1098, he was a subaltern of the megas doux John Doukas during the latter's campaign to recover the Aegean littoral of Anatolia from the Seljuq Turks. Following the recapture of Ephesus, Petzeas was appointed as the city's governor (doux). He remained in the post until 1105/6, when he was sent to replace Kantakouzenos as the governor of Laodicea on the Lycus. Nothing further is known of him.

== Sources ==
- Skoulatos, Basile (1980). Les personnages byzantins de l'Alexiade: Analyse prosopographique et synthèse [The Byzantine Personalities of the Alexiad: Prosopographical Analysis and Synthesis] (in French). Louvain-la-Neuve and Louvain: Bureau du Recueil Collège Érasme and Éditions Nauwelaerts. OCLC 8468871.
