= Byzantine Crete =

Province of the Byzantine Empire

Crete Κρήτη (Krḗtē)
- Province of the Byzantine Empire
- c. 297 – c. 824/827; 961–1205
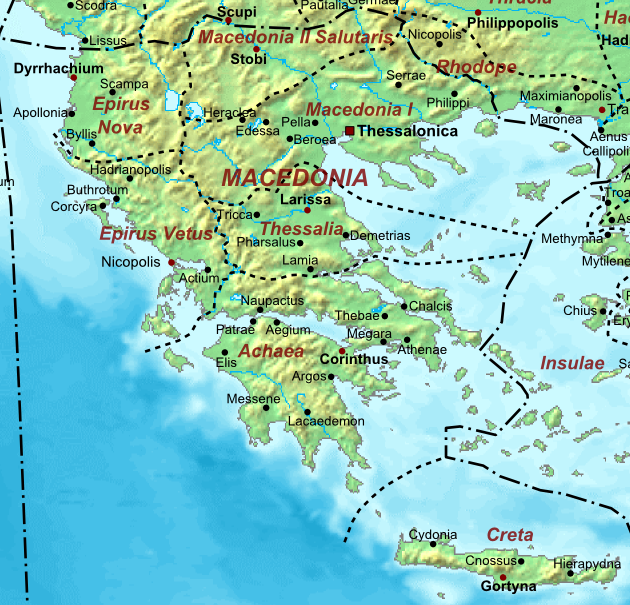
- Diocese of Macedonia, c. 400
- Capital: Gortyn (until 820s); Chandax (from 961)
- History
  - Crete separated from Cyrenaica: c. 297
  - Muslim conquest: c. 824 or 827
  - Byzantine reconquest: 960–961
  - Genoese / Venetian conquest: 1205
| Preceded by | Succeeded by |
| Creta et Cyrenaica; Emirate of Crete | Emirate of Crete; Kingdom of Candia |
- Today part of: Greece

The island of Crete came under the rule of the Byzantine Empire in two periods: the first extends from the late antiquity (3rd century) to the conquest of the island by Andalusian exiles in the late 820s, and the second from the island's reconquest in 961 to its capture by the competing forces of Genoa and Venice in 1205.

== History ==
=== First Byzantine period ===
Under Roman rule, Crete was part of the joint province as Crete and Cyrenaica. Under Diocletian (r. 284–305) it was formed as a separate province, while Constantine the Great (r. 306–337) subordinated it to the Diocese of Moesiae (and later the Diocese of Macedonia) within the praetorian prefecture of Illyricum, an arrangement that persisted until the end of late antiquity. Some administrative institutions, like the venerable Koinon of the island, persisted until the end of the fourth century, but as elsewhere in the empire these provincial civic institutions were abandoned in face of the increasing power of imperial officials.

Few contemporary sources mention Crete during the period from the 4th century to the Muslim conquest in the 820s. During this time, the island was very much a quiet provincial backwater in the periphery of the Greco-Roman world. Its bishops are even absent from the First Council of Nicaea in 325, in contrast to neighbouring islands like Rhodes or Kos. With the exception of an attack by the Vandals in 457 and the great earthquakes of 9 July 365, 415, 448 and 531, which destroyed many towns, the island remained peaceful and prosperous, as testified by the numerous, large and well-built monuments from the period surviving on the island. In the 6th-century Synecdemus, Crete is marked as being governed by a consularis, with capital at Gortyn, and as many as 22 cities. The population in this period is estimated as high as 250,000, and was almost exclusively Christian, except for some Jews living in the main urban centres.

This peace was broken in the 7th century. Crete suffered a raid by the Slavs in 623, followed by Arab raids in 654 and the 670s, during the first wave of the early Muslim conquests, and again during the first decades of the 8th century, especially under Caliph al-Walid I (r. 705–715). Thereafter the island remained relatively safe, under the rule of an archon appointed by Constantinople. In ca. 732, the emperor Leo III the Isaurian transferred the island from the jurisdiction of the Pope to that of the Patriarchate of Constantinople. A strategos of Crete is attested in 767, and a seal of a tourmarches of Crete is known. This has led to suggestions that the island was constituted as a theme in the 8th century, perhaps as early as the 730s. Most scholars however do not consider the evidence conclusive enough and think it unlikely that the island was a theme at the time.

=== Arab conquest and Byzantine reconquest ===
Byzantine rule lasted until the late 820s, when a large group of exiles from Muslim Spain landed on the island and began its conquest. The Byzantines launched repeated expeditions to drive them back, and seem to have appointed a strategos to administer what parts of the island they still controlled. The successive campaigns were defeated however, and failed to prevent the establishment of the Saracen stronghold of Chandax on the northern coast, which became the capital of the new Emirate of Crete. The fall of Crete to the Arabs posed a major headache for Byzantium, as it opened the coasts and islands of the Aegean Sea to piracy.

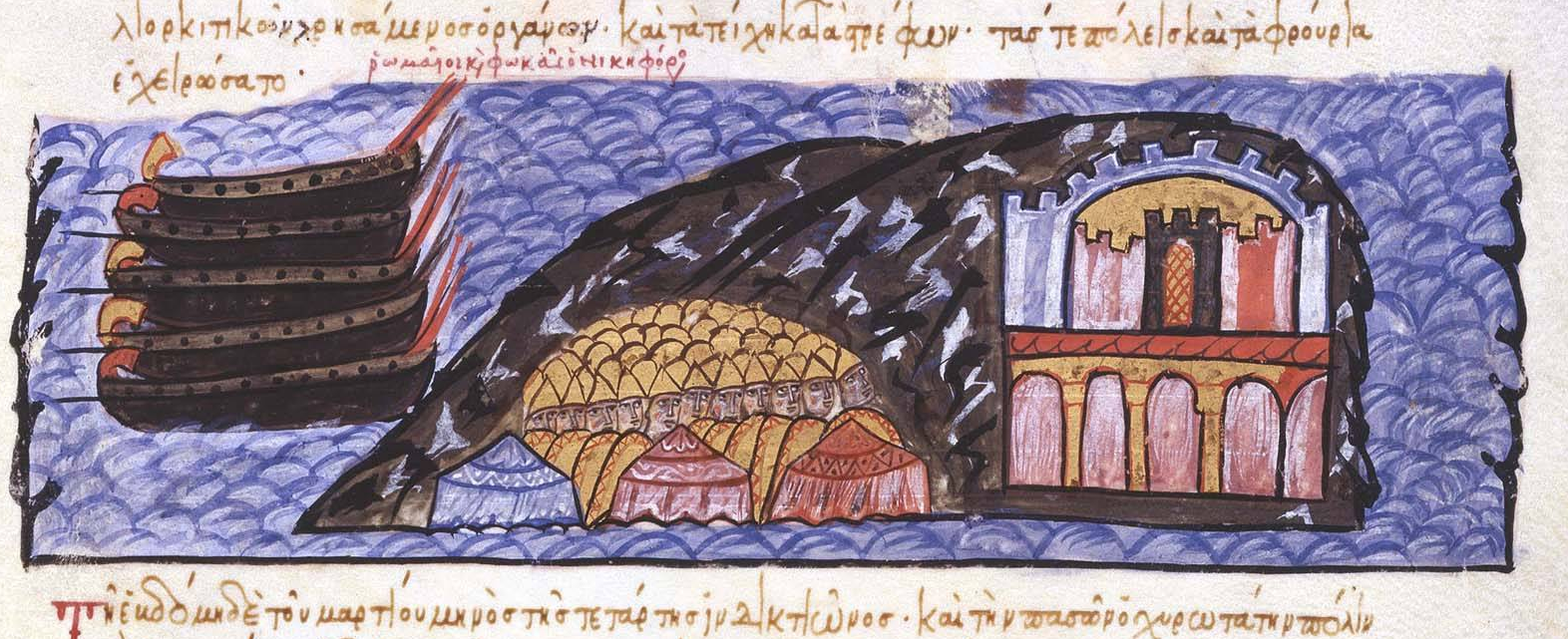
The Byzantines besiege Chandax, from the Madrid Skylitzes

A major Byzantine campaign in 842/843 under Theoktistos made some headway, and apparently allowed for the re-establishment of the recovered parts of the island as a theme, as evidenced by the presence of a strategos of Crete in the contemporary Taktikon Uspensky. However Theoktistos had to abandon the campaign, and the troops left behind were quickly defeated by the Saracens. Further Byzantine attempts at reconquest in 911 and 949 failed disastrously, until in 960–961 the general Nikephoros Phokas, at the head of a huge army, landed on the island and stormed Chandax, restoring Crete to Byzantium.

=== Second Byzantine period ===
After the reconquest, the island was organized as a regular theme, with a strategos based at Chandax. Extensive efforts at conversion of the populace were undertaken, led by John Xenos and Nikon the Metanoeite. A regiment (taxiarchia) of 1000 men was raised as the island's garrison, under a separate taxiarches and subdivided into tourmai.

Under Alexios I Komnenos (r. 1081–1118), the island was ruled by a doux or katepano. By the early 12th century, it came, along with southern Greece (the themes of Hellas and the Peloponnese) under the overall control of the megas doux, the commander-in-chief of the Byzantine navy. Aside from the revolt of its governor, Karykes, in 1092/1093, the island remained a relatively peaceful backwater, securely in Byzantine hands until the Fourth Crusade. During the Crusade, Crete appears to have been granted to Boniface I, Marquess of Montferrat as a pronoia by the emperor Alexios IV Angelos. Boniface however, unable to extend his control to the island, sold his rights to the island to the Republic of Venice. In the event, the island was seized by the Venetians' rivals, the Republic of Genoa, and it took Venice until 1212 to secure her control over the island and establish it as a Venetian colony, the Kingdom of Candia.

== Governors ==
=== Office of governor ===
According to the Notitia Dignitatum and the Synekdemos, Crete was governed by a consularis belonging to the senatorial rank of clarissimus between the 4th and 6th centuries. It was one of only four provinces of this rank or higher in the praetorian prefecture of Illyricum, the other eight being of lower rank. In 539, there is a lone attestation of a proconsul with the rank of spectabilis, suggesting that the province had been upgraded.

The status of the province after early Muslim conquests, when the theme system was being instituted is unclear. It may have been part of the theme of Hellas or Peloponnese. It was a separate province governed by archons (an archontia) from the first half of the eighth century. These are mostly known from seals and can be ordered and dated only approximately. An archontia lacked the military resources of a theme and Crete's lower status relative to the themes was probably a factor in its inability to resist the Arab incursions without major expeditionary forces sent from elsewhere.

Crete is not included in any surviving list of themes, either Byzantine or Arab. In the Taktikon of 842/843, there is reference to both a "patrician and strategos of Crete" and an "archon of Crete", implying that Crete had recently been raised to a theme and its governors from archon to strategos. This was probably a response to the Arab invasion. According to the Continuations of Theophanes, the Emperor Michael II (820–829) appointed Photeinos "to govern the affairs of Crete", probably around 828. He was probably the first strategos, although his authority would have been limited by the Arab conquests. With the failure of the campaign of Theoktistos in 843, the theme of Crete ceased to exist.

=== List of governors ===
Proconsul

- Helios (539)

Archon

- Theophanes Lardotyros (c. 764–767), also called strategos and archisatrap in the Vita of Stephen the Younger
- John (8th century), paraphylax
- Leo (8th century), imperial spatharios
- Basil (8th century), imperial spatharios
- Baasakios (8th/9th century), imperial spatharios
- Nicholas (8th/9th century), imperial spatharios and hypatos
- Nicholas (8th/9th century), imperial spatharios
- Petronas (first years of the 9th century), imperial spatharios
- Constantine (first quarter of the 9th century), imperial spatharios

Strategos

- Photeinos (c. 828)
- Arab rule (843–961)
- Michael (10th/11th century), dishypatos
- Basil (c. 1000), patrician
- Bracheon Philaretos (c. 1028), protospatharios
- Eumathios (1028), protospatharios

Doux (katepano)

- Michael Karantenos (1088–1089), vestarch
- Karykes (1090–1092)
- Nikephoros Diogenes (before 1094), son of Romanos IV
- Michael (11th/12th century)
- John Elladas (1118), protoproedros
- John Straboromanos (mid-12th century)
- Alexios Kontostephanos (1167), nephew of Manuel I
- Constantine Doukas (1183)
- Stephen Kontostephanos (1193)
- Nikephoros Kontostephanos (1197)

== Sources ==
- Detorakis, Theocharis E. (1986). Ιστορία της Κρήτης [History of Crete] (in Greek). Athens. OCLC 715204595.
- Hetherington, Paul (2001), The Greek Islands. Guide to the Byzantine and Medieval Buildings and their Art, London, ISBN 1-899163-68-9
- Kazhdan, Alexander, ed. (1991). The Oxford Dictionary of Byzantium. Oxford and New York: Oxford University Press. ISBN 0-19-504652-8.
- Makrypoulias, Christos G. (2000), "Byzantine Expeditions against the Emirate of Crete c. 825–949", Graeco-Arabica (7–8): 347–362
- Nesbitt, John; Oikonomides, Nicolas, eds. (1994). Catalogue of Byzantine Seals at Dumbarton Oaks and in the Fogg Museum of Art, Volume 2: South of the Balkans, the Islands, South of Asia Minor. Vol. 2. Washington, DC: Dumbarton Oaks Research Library and Collection. ISBN 0-88402-226-9.
- Oikonomidis, N. (1980). "Οι αυθένται των Κρητών το 1118" [The lords of the Cretans in 1118]. Πεπραγμένα του Δ' Διεθνούς Κρητολογικού Συνεδρίου, Ηράκλειο, 29 Αυγούστου - 3 Δεκεμβρίου 1976. Τόμος Β′ Βυζαντινοί και μέσοι χρόνοι (in Greek). Athens: University of Crete. pp. 308–317.
- Treadgold, Warren (1997). A History of the Byzantine State and Society. Stanford, California: Stanford University Press. ISBN 0-8047-2630-2.
- Tsougarakis, Dimitris (1988). Byzantine Crete: From the 5th Century to the Venetian Conquest. Athens: Historical Publications St. D. Basilopoulos. ISBN 960-7100-04-2.
