= Paraphylax =

The paraphylax (Greek: παραφύλαξ, "chief guardian") was a low-ranking provincial military office in the middle Byzantine Empire.

The paraphylax is often attested in lead seals of the 7th–9th centuries, and mentioned in lists of offices. The post was low-ranking (bearers typically held the dignities of hypatos, strator, or, at most, spatharios), and apparently concerned with the maintenance of public order and/or the command of irregular forces. In seals, the office is frequently combined with provincial fiscal posts as well, such as the kommerkiarios or the chartoularios of the genikon.

== Sources ==
- Kazhdan, Alexander (1991). "Paraphylax". In Kazhdan, Alexander (ed.). The Oxford Dictionary of Byzantium. Oxford and New York: Oxford University Press. p. 1585. ISBN 0-19-504652-8.
