= Abydos (Hellespont) =

Ancient city in Turkey

- Ἄβυδος (Ancient Greek)
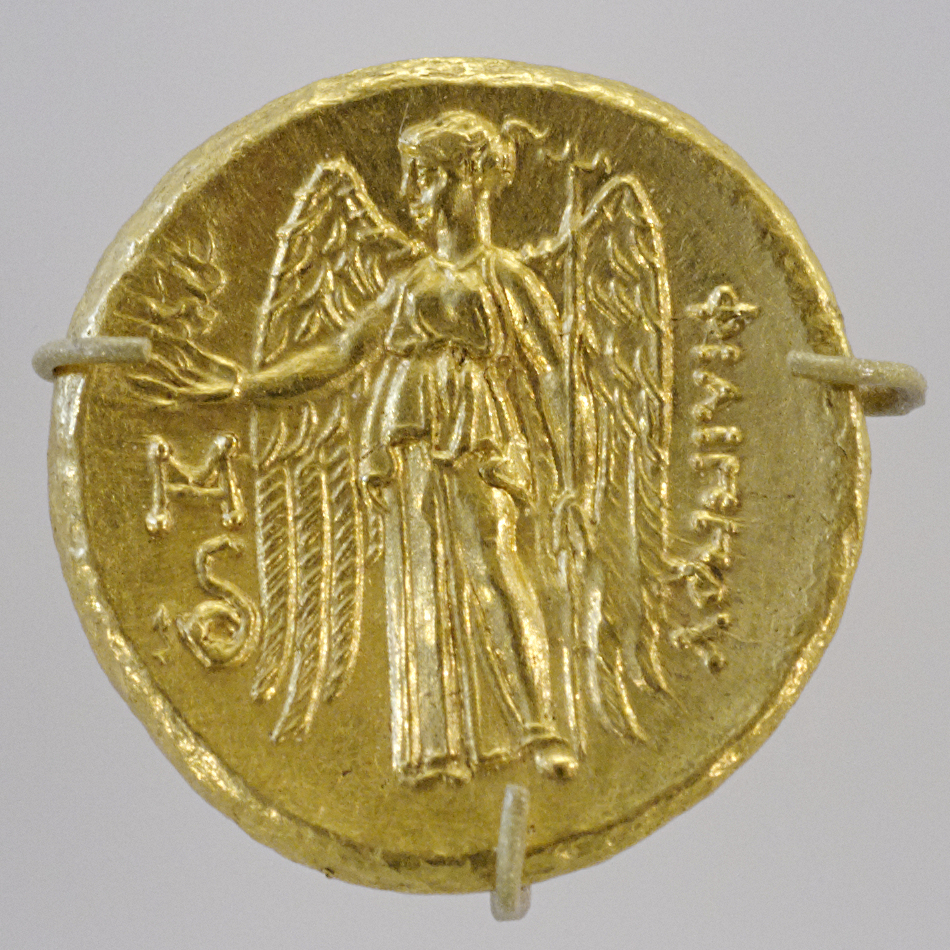
- Macedonian gold stater, Abydos mint. 323–317 or 297 BC.

- Location within Marmara
- 40°11′43″N 26°24′18″E
- Type: Settlement
- Location: Çanakkale, Çanakkale Province, Turkey
- Region: Mysia

History
- Built: c. 670 BC
- Abandoned: c. 1304-1310/1318

Site notes
- Public access: Restricted

Abydos (Ancient Greek: Ἄβυδος, Latin: Abydus) was an ancient city and bishopric in Mysia. (Note: Abydos is placed either within Mysia, or the Troad.) It was located at the Nara Burnu promontory on the Asian coast of the Hellespont (the straits of Dardanelles), opposite the ancient city of Sestos, and near the city of Çanakkale in Turkey. Abydos was founded in c. 670 BC at the most narrow point in the straits, and thus was one of the main crossing points between Europe and Asia, until its replacement by the crossing between Lampsacus and Kallipolis in the 13th century, and the abandonment of Abydos in the early 14th century.

In Greek mythology, Abydos is presented in the myth of Hero and Leander as the home of Leander. The city is also mentioned in Rodanthe and Dosikles, a novel written by Theodore Prodromos, a 12th-century writer, in which Dosikles kidnaps Rodanthe at Abydos.

== Archaeology ==
In 1675, the site of Abydos was first identified, and was subsequently visited by numerous classicists and travellers, such as Robert Wood, Richard Chandler, and Lord Byron. The city's acropolis is known in Turkish as Mal Tepe.

Following the city's abandonment, the ruins of Abydos were scavenged for building materials from the 14th to the 19th century, and remains of walls and buildings continued to be reported until at least the 19th century; however, little remains and the area was declared a restricted military zone in the early 20th century, thus little to no excavation has taken place.

== History ==
=== Classical period ===
The environs of Abydos in Antiquity

Abydos is mentioned in the Iliad as a Trojan ally, and, according to Strabo, was occupied by Bebryces and later Thracians after the Trojan War. It has been suggested that the city was originally a Phoenician colony as there was a temple of Aphrodite Porne (Aphrodite the Harlot) within Abydos. Abydos was settled by Milesian colonists contemporaneously with the foundation of the cities of Priapos and Prokonnesos in c. 670 BC. Strabo related that Gyges, King of Lydia, granted his consent to the Milesians to settle Abydos; it is argued that this was carried out by Milesian mercenaries to act as a garrison to prevent Thracian raids into Asia Minor. The city became a thriving centre for tuna exportation as a result of the high yield of tuna in the Hellespont.

Abydos was ruled by Daphnis, a pro-Persian tyrant, in the 520s BC, but was occupied by the Persian Empire in 514. Darius I destroyed the city following his Scythian campaign in 512. Abydos participated in the Ionian Revolt in the early 5th century BC, however, the city returned briefly to Persian control as, in 480, at the onset of the Second Persian invasion of Greece, Xerxes I and the Persian army passed through Abydos on their march to Greece crossing the Hellespont on Xerxes' Pontoon Bridges. After the failed Persian invasion, Abydos became a member of the Athenian-led Delian League, and was part of the Hellespontine district. Ostensibly an ally, Abydos was hostile to Athens throughout this time, and contributed a phoros of 4-6 talents. Xenophon documented that Abydos possessed gold mines at Astyra or Kremaste at the time of his writing.

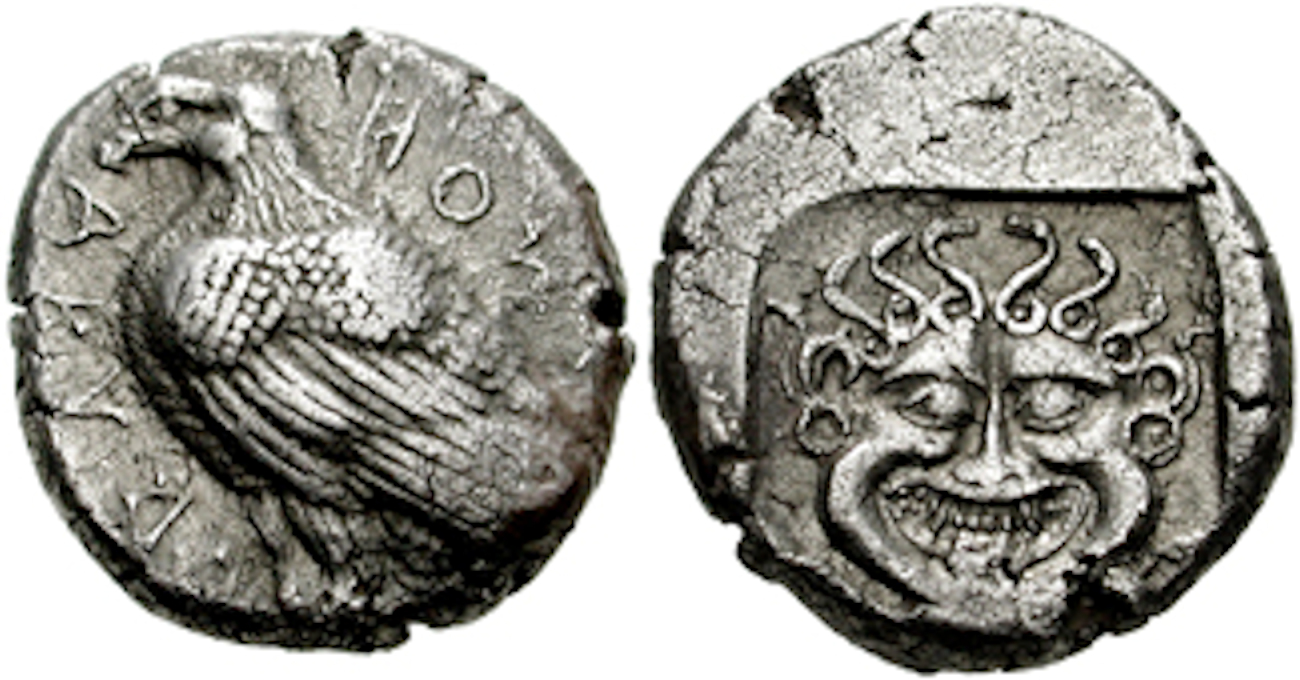
Coinage of Abydos around the time of the Persian Wars. ABYΔ-[H]NON, eagle standing left / Facing gorgoneion with protruding tongue, within incuse square. Circa 500-480 BC

During the Second Peloponnesian War, a Spartan expedition led by Dercylidas arrived at Abydos in early May 411 BC and successfully convinced the city to defect from the Delian League and fight against Athens, at which time he was made harmost (commander/governor) of Abydos. A Spartan fleet was defeated by Athens at Abydos in the autumn of 411 BC. Abydos was attacked by the Athenians in the winter of 409/408 BC, but was repelled by a Persian force led by Pharnabazus, satrap (governor) of Hellespontine Phrygia. Dercylidas held the office of harmost of Abydos until at least c. 407. According to Aristotle, Abydos had an oligarchic constitution at this time. At the beginning of the Corinthian War in 394 BC, Agesilaus II, King of Sparta, passed through Abydos into Thrace. Abydos remained an ally of Sparta throughout the war and Dercylidas served as harmost of the city from 394 until he was replaced by Anaxibius in c. 390; the latter was killed in an ambush near Abydos by the Athenian general Iphicrates in c. 389/388. At the conclusion of the Corinthian War, under the terms of the Peace of Antalcidas in 387 BC, Abydos was annexed to the Persian Empire. Within the Persian Empire, Abydos was administered as part of the satrapy of Hellespontine Phrygia, and was ruled by the tyrant Philiscus in 368. In c. 360 BC, the city came under the control of the tyrant Iphiades.

=== Hellenistic period ===
Abydos remained under Persian control until it was seized by a Macedonian army led by Parmenion, a general of Philip II, in the spring of 336 BC. In 335, whilst Parmenion besieged the city of Pitane, Abydos was besieged by a Persian army led by Memnon of Rhodes, forcing Parmenion to abandon his siege of Pitane and march north to relieve Abydos. Alexander ferried across from Sestos to Abydos in 334 and travelled south to the city of Troy, after which he returned to Abydos. The following day, Alexander left Abydos and led his army north to Percote. Alexander later established a royal mint at Abydos, as well as at other cities in Asia Minor.

After the death of Alexander the Great in 323 BC, Abydos, as part of the satrapy of Hellespontine Phrygia, came under the control of Leonnatus as a result of the Partition of Babylon. At the Partition of Triparadisus in 321 BC, Arrhidaeus succeeded Leonnatus as satrap of Hellespontine Phrygia.

In 302, during the Fourth War of the Diadochi, Lysimachus, King of Thrace, crossed over into Asia Minor and invaded the kingdom of Antigonus I. Unlike the neighbouring cities of Parium and Lampsacus which surrendered, Abydos resisted Lysimachus and was besieged. Lysimachus was forced to abandon the siege, however, after the arrival of a relief force sent by Demetrius, son of King Antigonus I. According to Polybius, by the third century BC, the neighbouring city of Arisbe had become subordinate to Abydos. The city of Dardanus also came under the control of Abydos at some point in the Hellenistic period. Abydos became part of the Seleucid Empire after 281 BC. The city was conquered by Ptolemy III Euergetes, King of Egypt, in 245 BC, and remained under Ptolemaic control until at least 241, as Abydos had become part of the Kingdom of Pergamon by c. 200 BC.

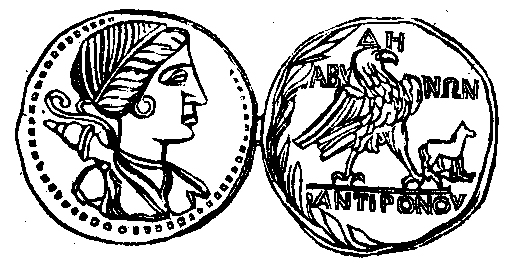
Hellenistic tetradrachm of Abydos, with the legend ΑΒΥΔΗΝΩΝ ("of the Abydenes")

During the Second Macedonian War, Abydos was besieged by Philip V, King of Macedonia, in 200 BC, during which many of its citizens chose to commit suicide rather than surrender. Marcus Aemilius Lepidus met with Philip V during the siege to deliver an ultimatum on behalf of the Roman senate. Ultimately, the city was forced to surrender to Philip V due to a lack of reinforcements. The Macedonian occupation ended after the Peace of Flamininus at the end of the war in 196 BC. At this time, Abydos was substantially depopulated and partially ruined as a result of the Macedonian occupation.

In the spring of 196 BC, Abydos was seized by Antiochus III, Megas Basileus of the Seleucid Empire, who refortified the city in 192/191 BC. Antiochus III later withdrew from Abydos during the Roman-Seleucid War, thus allowing for the transportation of the Roman army into Asia Minor by October 190 BC. Dardanus was subsequently liberated from Abydene control, and the Treaty of Apamea of 188 BC returned Abydos to the Kingdom of Pergamon. A gymnasium was active at Abydos in the 2nd century BC.

=== Roman period ===
Attalus III, King of Pergamon, bequeathed his kingdom to Rome upon his death in 133 BC, and thus Abydos became part of the province of Asia. The gold mines of Abydos at Astyra or Kremaste were near exhaustion at the time was Strabo was writing. The city was counted amongst the telonia (custom houses) of the province of Asia in the lex portorii Asiae of 62 AD, and formed part of the conventus iuridicus Adramytteum. Abydos is mentioned in the Tabula Peutingeriana and Antonine Itinerary. The mint of Abydos ceased to function in the mid-3rd century AD.

It is believed that Abydos, with Sestos and Lampsacus, is referred to as one of the "three large capital cities" of the Roman Empire in Weilüe, a 3rd-century AD Chinese text. The city was the centre for customs collection at the southern entrance of the Sea of Marmara, and was administered by a komes ton Stenon (count of the Straits) or an archon from the 3rd century to the 5th century AD.

=== Medieval period ===
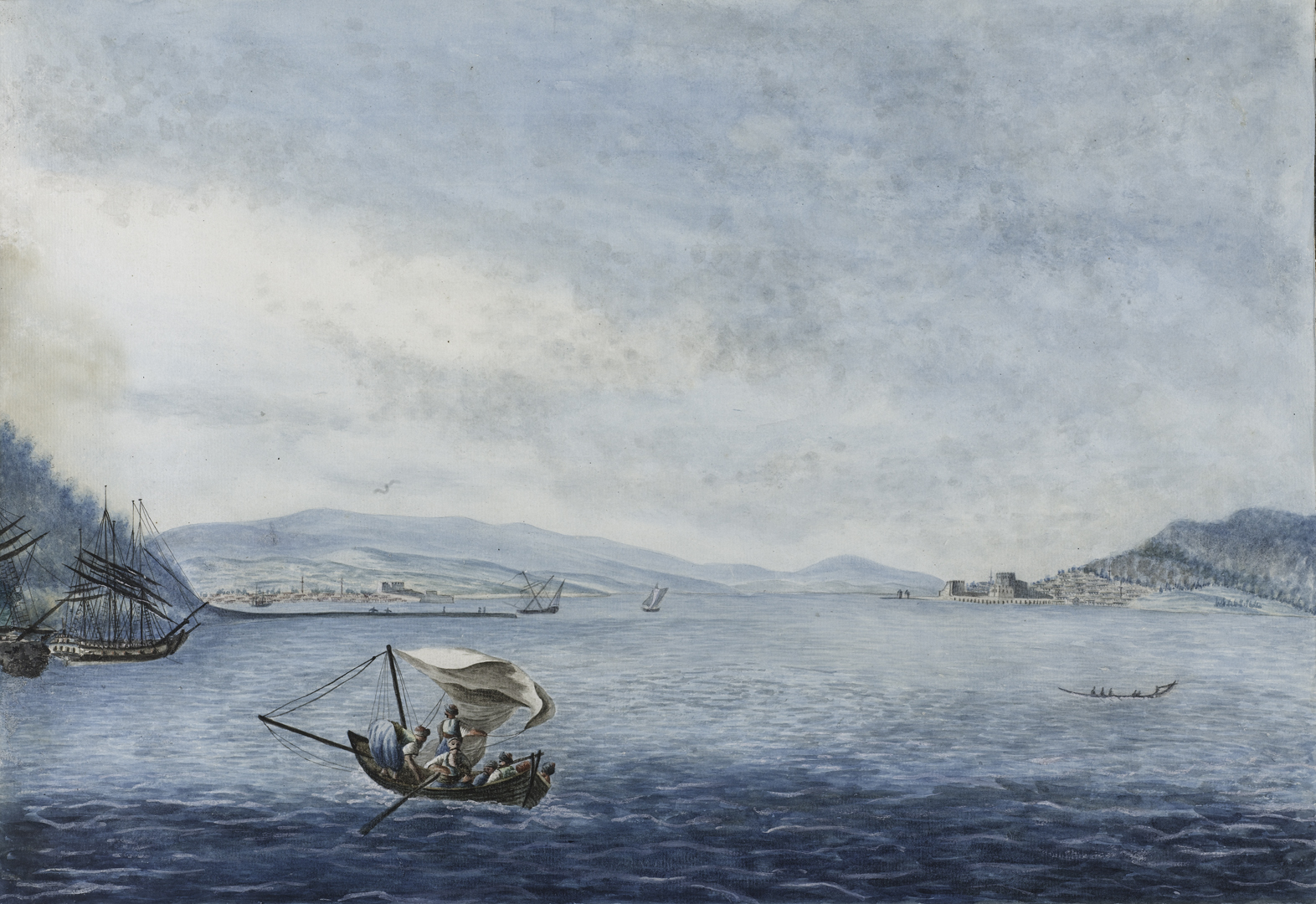
View of the straits at Abydos.

Pope Martin I rested at Abydos in the summer of 653 whilst en route to Constantinople. As a result of the administrative reforms of the 7th century, Abydos came to be administered as part of the theme of Opsikion. The office of kommerkiarios of Abydos is first attested in the mid-7th century, and was later sometimes combined with the office of paraphylax, the military governor of the fort, introduced in the 8th century, at which time the office of komes ton stenon is last mentioned.

After the 7th century AD, Abydos became a major seaport. Maslama ibn Abd al-Malik, during his campaign against Constantinople, crossed over into Thrace at Abydos in July 717. The office of archon at Abydos was restored in the late 8th century and endured until the early 9th century. In 801, Empress Irene reduced commercial tariffs collected at Abydos. Emperor Nikephoros I, Irene's successor, introduced a tax on slaves purchased beyond the city. The city later also became part of the theme of the Aegean Sea and was the seat of a tourmarches.

Abydos was sacked by an Arab fleet led by Leo of Tripoli in 904 AD whilst en route to Constantinople. The revolt of Bardas Phokas was defeated by Emperor Basil II at Abydos in 989 AD. In 992, the Venetians were granted reduced commercial tariffs at Abydos as a special privilege. In the early 11th century, Abydos became the seat of a separate command and the office of strategos (governor) of Abydos is first mentioned in 1004 with authority over the northern shore of the Hellespont and the islands of the Sea of Marmara.

In 1024, a Rus' raid led by a certain Chrysocheir defeated the local commander at Abydos and proceeded to travel south through the Hellespont. Following the Battle of Manzikert, Abydos was seized by the Seljuk Turks, but was recovered in 1086 AD, in which year Leo Kephalas was appointed katepano of Abydos. Abydos' population likely increased at this time as a result of the arrival of refugees from northwestern Anatolia who had fled the advance of the Turks. In 1092/1093, the city was attacked by Tzachas, a Turkish pirate. Emperor Manuel I Komnenos repaired Abydos' fortifications in the late 12th century.

By the 13th century AD, the crossing from Lampsacus to Kallipolis had become more common and largely replaced the crossing from Abydos to Sestos. During the Fourth Crusade, in 1204, the Venetians seized Abydos, and, following the Sack of Constantinople and the formation of the Latin Empire later that year, Emperor Baldwin granted the land between Abydos and Adramyttium to his brother Henry of Flanders. Henry of Flanders passed through Abydos on 11 November 1204 and continued his march to Adramyttium. Abydos was seized by the Empire of Nicaea, a successor state of the Eastern Roman Empire, during its offensive in 1206–1207, but was reconquered by the Latin Empire in 1212–1213. The city was later recovered by Emperor John III Vatatzes. Abydos declined in the 13th century, and was eventually abandoned between 1304 and 1310/1318 due to the threat of Turkish tribes and disintegration of Roman control over the region.

== Ecclesiastical history ==
The bishopric of Abydus appears in all the Notitiae Episcopatuum of the Patriarchate of Constantinople from the mid-7th century until the time of Andronikos III Palaiologos (1341), first as a suffragan of Cyzicus and then from 1084 as a metropolitan see without suffragans. The earliest bishop mentioned in extant documents is Marcian, who signed the joint letter of the bishops of Hellespontus to Emperor Leo I in 458, protesting about the murder of Proterius of Alexandria. A letter of Peter the Fuller (471–488) mentions a bishop of Abydus called Pamphilus. Ammonius signed the decretal letter of the Council of Constantinople in 518 against Severus of Antioch and others. Isidore was at the Third Council of Constantinople (680–681), John at the Trullan Council (692), Theodore at the Second Council of Nicaea (787). An unnamed bishop of Abydus was a counsellor of Emperor Nikephoros II in 969.

Seals attest Theodosius as bishop of Abydos in the 11th century, and John as metropolitan bishop of Abydos in the 11/12th century. Abydos remained a metropolitan see until the city fell to the Turks in the 14th century. The diocese is currently a titular see of the Patriarchate of Constantinople, and Gerasimos Papadopoulos was titular Bishop of Abydos from 1962 until his death in 1995. Simeon Kruzhkov was bishop of Abydos from May to September 1998. Kyrillos Katerelos was consecrated bishop of Abydos in 2008.

In 1222, during the Latin occupation, the papal legate Giovanni Colonna united the dioceses of Abydos and Madytos and placed the see under direct Papal authority. No longer a residential bishopric, Abydus is today listed by the Catholic Church as a titular see.

== See also ==
- List of ancient Greek cities

== Bibliography ==
- Allen, Pauline (2003). Maximus the Confessor and his Companions: Documents from Exile. Oxford University Press.
- Ashley, James R. (2004). The Macedonian Empire: The Era of Warfare Under Philip II and Alexander the Great, 359-323 B.C. McFarland. ISBN 9780786419180.
- Bean, G. E. (1976). The Princeton Encyclopedia of Classical Sites, ed. Richard Stillwell. Princeton University Press.
- Briscoe, John (2015). "Aemilius Lepidus, Marcus (1), Roman consul, pontifex maximus, censor, 179 BCE". The Oxford Classical Dictionary. Oxford University Press.
- Dmitriev, Sviatoslav (2005). City Government in Hellenistic and Roman Asia Minor. Oxford University Press.
- Dmitriev, Sviatoslav (2011). The Greek Slogan of Freedom and Early Roman Politics in Greece. Oxford University Press. ISBN 9780195375183.
- Errington, R. M. (1989). "Rome against Philip and Antiochus". The Cambridge Ancient History, Volume 8: Rome and the Mediterranean to 133 BC, 2nd edition, ed. A. E. Astin, F. W. Walbank, M. W. Frederiksen, R. M. Ogilvie. Cambridge University Press.
- Evans, Helen C.; Wixom, William D. (1997). The Glory of Byzantium: Art and Culture of the Middle Byzantine Era, A.D. 843-1261. Metropolitan Museum of Art. ISBN 9780870997778.
- Fine, John Van Antwerp (1983). The Ancient Greeks: A Critical History. Harvard University Press.
- Freely, John (2010). Children of Achilles: The Greeks in Asia Minor Since the Days of Troy. I.B.Tauris. ISBN 9781845119416.
- Gorman, Vanessa B. (2001). Miletos, the Ornament of Ionia: A History of the City to 400 B.C.E. University of Michigan Press.
- Grainger, John D. (1997). A Seleukid Prosopography and Gazetteer. BRILL.
- Grainger, John D. (2002). The Roman War of Antiochos the Great. BRILL. ISBN 978-9004128408.
- Gunter, Ann C. (2015). Encyclopedia of the History of Classical Archaeology, ed. Nancy Thomson de Grummond. Routledge.
- Haldon, John; Davis, Shelby Cullom (2002). Warfare, State And Society In The Byzantine World 560-1204. Routledge. ISBN 9781135364373.
- Hansen, Mogens Herman; Nielsen, Thomas Heine (2004). An Inventory of Archaic and Classical Poleis. Oxford University Press. ISBN 9780198140993.
- Hodkinson, Stephen J. (2005). "Dercylidas". The Oxford Classical Dictionary. Oxford University Press.
- Hopkinson, Neil (2012). "Hero and Leander". The Oxford Classical Dictionary. Oxford University Press.
- Jacobs, Bruno (2011). "ACHAEMENID SATRAPIES". Encyclopaedia Iranica.
- Jaques, Tony (2007). Dictionary of Battles and Sieges: A-E. Greenwood Publishing Group. ISBN 9780313335372.
- Kagan, Donald (2013). The Fall of the Athenian Empire. Cornell University Press. ISBN 978-0801467271.
- Kazhdan, Aleksandr; Wharton, Annabel Jane (1985). Change in Byzantine Culture in the Eleventh and Twelfth Centuries. University of California Press. ISBN 9780520051294.
- Kazhdan, Alexander, ed. (1991). The Oxford Dictionary of Byzantium. Oxford and New York: Oxford University Press. ISBN 0-19-504652-8.
- Korobeinikov, Dimitri (2014). Byzantium and the Turks in the Thirteenth Century. Oxford University Press. ISBN 9780191017940.
- Lampakis, Stylianos (2008). "Theme of Opsikion". Encyclopaedia of the Hellenic World, Asia Minor.
- Leslie, D. D.; Gardiner, K. J. H. (1995). "All Roads Lead to Rome: Chinese Knowledge of the Roman Empire". Journal of Asian History. 29 (1). Harrassowitz Verlag: 61–81.
- Leveniotis, Georgios A. (2017). Abydos of Hellespont and Its Region. VANIAS.
- Mackay, T. S. (1976). "Dardanos". The Princeton Encyclopedia of Classical Sites, ed. Richard Stillwell. Princeton University Press.
- Maffre, Frédéric (2007). "Indigenous aristocracies in Hellespontine Phrygia". Persian Responses: Political and Cultural Interaction with(in) the Achaemenid Empire, ed. Christopher Tuplin. ISD LLC.
- Magie, David (2015). Roman Rule in Asia Minor, Volume 1: To the End of the Third Century After Christ. Princeton University Press. ISBN 9781400849796.
- Magie, David (2017). Roman Rule in Asia Minor, Volume 2: To the End of the Third Century After Christ. Princeton University Press. ISBN 9781400887743.
- McCormick, Michael (2001). Origins of the European Economy: Communications and Commerce AD 300-900. Cambridge University Press.
- Miller, Dean (2014). Beliefs, Rituals, and Symbols of Ancient Greece and Rome. Cavendish Square Publishing.
- Mitchell, Stephen (2005). "Abydos". The Oxford Classical Dictionary. Oxford University Press.
- Nesbitt, John; Oikonomides, Nicolas, eds. (1996). Catalogue of Byzantine Seals at Dumbarton Oaks and in the Fogg Museum of Art, Volume 3: West, Northwest, and Central Asia Minor and the Orient. Vol. 3. Washington, DC: Dumbarton Oaks Research Library and Collection. ISBN 0-88402-250-1.
- Phang, Sara E.; Spence, Iain; Kelly, Douglas; Londey, Peter (2016). Conflict in Ancient Greece and Rome: The Definitive Political, Social, and Military Encyclopedia. ABC-CLIO. ISBN 9781610690201.
- Rimestad, Sebastian (2014). "Orthodox churches in Estonia". Eastern Christianity and Politics in the Twenty-First Century, ed. Lucian N. Leustean. Routledge.
- Roberts, John (2007). "Leonnatus". Oxford Dictionary of the Classical World. Oxford University Press.
- Roesti, Robert M. (1966). "The Declining Economic Role of the Mediterranean Tuna Fishery". The American Journal of Economics and Sociology. 25 (1): 77–90. doi:10.1111/j.1536-7150.1966.tb02768.x.
- Roisman, Joseph (2012). Alexander's Veterans and the Early Wars of the Successors. University of Texas Press. ISBN 9780292735965.
- Spawforth, Antony (2015). "Arisbe". The Oxford Classical Dictionary. Oxford University Press.
- Van Tricht, Filip (2011). The Latin Renovatio of Byzantium: The Empire of Constantinople (1204–1228). Leiden: Brill. ISBN 978-90-04-20323-5.
- Venning, T.; Harris, J. (2006). Chronology of the Byzantine Empire. Springer. ISBN 9780230505865.
- Westlake, H. D. (1985). "Abydos and Byzantium: The Sources for Two Episodes in the Ionian War". Museum Helveticum. 42 (4). Schwabe AG Verlag: 313–327.
- Wortley, John, ed. (2010). John Skylitzes: A Synopsis of Byzantine History, 811–1057. Cambridge: Cambridge University Press. ISBN 978-0-521-76705-7.
- Wright, Edmund (2006). "Abydos". A Dictionary of World History. Oxford University Press. doi:10.1093/acref/9780192807007.001.0001. ISBN 9780192807007.
