= Karykes =

Karykes (Greek: Καρύκης, Latinised Caryces) was the Byzantine governor of Crete who led a rebellion that began in 1090 or 1091 and lasted into 1092 or 1093 during the reign of Emperor Alexios I Komnenos. The principal narrative sources for the revolt are Anna Komnene and Joannes Zonaras, but they provide few details. The historian Michael Glykas confuses this revolt with the contemporary revolt of Rhapsomates in Cyprus.

That Karykes is known only by his family name in contemporary chronicles suggests that he was well known, but of his family connections nothing is known. It has been hypothesised that he was the same person as the Niketas Karykes who was the Byzantine doux of Bulgaria between 1070 and 1090. A couple of other Karykai are known from the 11th and 12th centuries, including a Basil Karykes.

== Revolt ==
=== Causes ===
The cause of the revolt is not known from contemporary sources, which provide few details.

Ferdinand Chalandon and Judith Herrin both suppose it to have been a tax revolt against the fiscal policies of Alexios I. Herrin attributes the same motive to the revolt of Rhapsomates and speculates that both may have been timed to take advantage of the war between Byzantium and Tzachas, emir of Smyrna. She even suggests that the rebels may have acted in league with the emir. Dimitris Tsougarakis argues that Karykes looks more like the leader of a military coup than a popular revolt. Certainly he did not have enough popular support to withstand a military response from the central government, which is not consistent with a broad-based tax revolt. It also contrasts with the revolt on Cyprus, which resisted government forces for some time.

The revolts on Crete and Cyprus were probably independent, although they are mentioned together in both Anna Komnene and Zonaras, as well as in speech of John the Oxite. The preoccupation of the central government with fighting the Pechenegs and Turks may have forced the local governors of Crete and Cyprus to take matters of defence into their own hands in defiance of Constantinople.

=== Events ===
That Karykes was the governor of Crete—bearing the title doux or katepano—is almost certain, although the sources leave open the possibility that he came from elsewhere and seized control of Crete. His revolt began in late 1090 or early 1091, since the basilikos logos of John the Oxite addressed to Alexios I and dated to February or March 1091 refers to the rebellions in Crete and Cyprus as ongoing. This was shortly before Alexios' victory over the Pechenegs at Levounion in April.

For a time, Karykes succeeded in imposing his rule on the island in defiance of imperial authority. In 1092 or 1093, Alexios I sent a fleet under megas doux Joannes Doukas to suppress the revolt. There are conflicting accounts of Doukas' movements. According to the Life of Saint Meletios the Younger, Doukas visited Euboea first, where he learned that the Cretans had risen up and killed Karykes. He then proceeded to the island, where he peacefully reestablished imperial government and left behind garrisons. There is a letter of Theophylact of Ohrid addressed to Doukas at Chalkis that may date from this time, which would lend support to the account in the Life. According to Anna Komnene, it was only when Doukas arrived on the island of Karpathos off the coast of Crete that the Cretans killed Karykes and surrendered to Doukas without resistance. She places Doukas' expedition immediately after his defeat of the emir of Smyrna. This suggests that it took place in the summer or fall of 1092. The Life of Meletios has Doukas departing Chalkis in the spring, however, which is more consistent with the spring of 1093. An inscription at Didyma commemorating the restoration of the fort of Hieron was linked by Helene Ahrweiler to Doukas' expedition against Crete, since Hieron was a traditional setting off point for Crete and Cyprus, but her reading is not widely accepted.

== Legacy ==
The revolt of Karykes was one of the last events of empire-wide importance that took place in Byzantine Crete. Thereafter until the Venetian conquest (1205) the island was a provincial backwater.

It has been suggested by some modern historians that the revolt of Karykes may be related to the origins of the twelve Cretan noble families, who claimed a privileged position in Venetian Crete in the 13th century. There is a forged 13th-century document that records how an emperor named Alexios sent a force of 100 ships to force rebellious Crete to submit to his son, assisted by twelve families. The events described to not apply exactly neither to Alexios I nor Alexios II, among other things, but it appears to refer to a historical revolt in Crete. It describes the Cretans as refusing to pay taxes and expelling imperial officials, but the revolt cannot certainly be identified with the revolt of Karykes.

== Bibliography ==
- Cheynet, Jean-Claude (1996). Pouvoir et contestations à Byzance (963–1210). Byzantina Sorbonensia. Publications de la Sorbonne. ISBN 978-2-85944-840-0.
- Frankopan, Peter (2004). "Challenges to Imperial Authority in Byzantium: Revolts on Crete and Cyprus at the End of the 11th C.". Byzantion. 74 (2): 382–402. JSTOR 44172968.
- Gautier, Paul (1977). "Défection et soumission de la Crète sous Alexis Ier Comnène". Revue des études byzantines. 35: 215–227. doi:10.3406/rebyz.1977.2071.
- Savvides, Alexis G. C. (2000). "Can we refer to a concerted action among Rapsomates, Caryces and the Emir Tzachas between AD 1091 and 1093?". Byzantion. 70 (1): 122–134. JSTOR 44172366.
- Tsougarakis, Dimitris (1988). Byzantine Crete: From the 5th Century to the Venetian Conquest. Athens: Historical Publications St. D. Basilopoulos. ISBN 960-7100-04-2.
