= Kommerkiarios =

The kommerkiarios (Greek: κομμερκιάριος) was a fiscal official of the Byzantine Empire charged with the collection of the imperial sales tax or kommerkion.

== History and functions ==
The kommerkiarios was perhaps the successor of the comes commerciorum, which was a late Roman controller of trade on the frontier. According to the late 4th-century Notitia Dignitatum, there were three comites commerciorum under the control of the comes sacrarum largitionum: one for Oriens and Egypt, one for Illyricum, and one for Moesia, Scythia Minor and Pontus (i.e. the Danube frontier and the Black Sea).

The term kommerkiarios first appears in fragmentary inscriptions of a law issued by Emperor Anastasios I (r. 491–518). The kommerkiarioi were stationed in many areas of the frontier, as indicated by their seals, which appear to substantiate the statement made by the 6th-century historian Procopius about Emperor Justinian I (r. 527–565) installing customs stations "at each strait" and sending two archontes to every location in order to collect tolls. Gabriel Millet, a French Byzantinist, considered the early kommerkiarioi as merchants of the Byzantine emperor, but his views are deemed questionable.

For one or two years, the [genikos] kommerkiarios would rent out his office at public auction. His functions entailed those of a quartermaster general of the Byzantine army, a duty collector, or of an entrepreneur (or group of entrepreneurs) who obtained a monopoly of silk production and silk trade. The kommerkiarioi had custom-made seals for their merchandise, displaying the image of the reigning emperor (or emperors), the indictions for which each seal was valid (ranging from 673/674 to 832/833), and the names of the warehouses (or apothekai, concentration and redistribution points) of the imperial provinces under their jurisdiction. For a brief period in 695–697 and permanently from 730/731 to 832/833, these custom-made seals never mention the names of individual kommerkiarioi, but rather mention the expression "of the imperial kommerkia" (supposedly because the kommerkia were offices operated by employees of the Byzantine state who may have exercised general control over the merchandise and collected duties). According to Nikolaos Oikonomides, the alterations made to the seals of the kommerkiarioi are to be attributed to Emperor Leo III the Isaurian (r. 717–741), who executed a systematic campaign of restoring state control over activities that were previously controlled by private interests. After the middle of the 8th century, these kommerkia only appear in Macedonia and Thrace.

By the end of the 7th century, the kommerkiarioi decreased in importance. According to the Kletorologion of Philotheos, they are mentioned as subaltern officials of the genikon logothesion. These new officials were known as basilikoi ["imperial"] kommerkiarioi and had jurisdiction over themes or ports, controlled imports and exports, and collected some duties. On the seals of the 9th to 11th centuries, the kommerkiarioi appear to be in control of larger territories, such as Cyprus or Chaldia, or operating in trade centers such as Cherson, Abydos, and Erythrai. Sometimes, the kommerkiarioi operated simultaneously in territories far removed from each other (such as Joseph who was abydikos and the kommerkiarios of Cephallenia and Thessalonica). Some kommerkiarioi, such as the kommerkiarios of Preslav and the kommerkiarios of the Bulgarians, were trade inspectors in the northern Balkans. They held court titles, such as protospatharios of the Chrysotriklinos or mandator, but could have specifically "commercial" positions such as metretes (Greek: μετρητής, "measurer"). A "megas kommerkiarios of the West", titled spatharokandidatos, appears on a seal dated to the second half of the 10th century.

The kommerkiarioi appeared in chrysobulls, at least until 1196, as collectors of kommerkion. However, the author of the Life of Athanasios of Athos already identified a kommerkiarios as the Byzantine equivalent of praktor.

== Sources ==
- Kazhdan, Alexander, ed. (1991). The Oxford Dictionary of Byzantium. Oxford and New York: Oxford University Press. ISBN 0-19-504652-8.
- Oikonomides, Nicolas (2002). "The Role of the Byzantine State in the Economy". In Laiou, Angeliki E. (ed.). The Economic History of Byzantium from the Seventh through the Fifteenth Century. Washington, DC: Dumbarton Oaks. ISBN 0-88402-288-9. Archived from the original on 2012-02-18.
- Millet, Gabriel (1924). "Sur les sceaux des commerciaires byzantines". Mélanges offerts à M. Gustave Schlumberger (in French). Vol. 2. Paris: Librairie Orientaliste Paul Geuthner.
- Stephenson, Paul (2000). Byzantium's Balkan Frontier: A Political Study of the Northern Balkans, 900-1204. Cambridge: Cambridge University Press. ISBN 0521770173.
- Montinaro, Federico (2013): Les premiers commerciaires byzantins. In: C. Zuckerman (ed.): Constructing the Seventh Century (= Travaux et Mémoires 17). Paris 2013, S. 351–538.
