= Logothetes tou genikou =

Ancient Byzantine finance minister

The logothetes tou genikou (Greek: λογοθέτης τοῦ γενικοῦ, often called genikos logothetes or simply ho genikos (ὁ γενικός [λογοθέτης], 'the general [logothete]'), and usually rendered in English as the General Logothete, was in charge of the 'general financial ministry', the genikon logothesion of the middle Byzantine Empire.

== History and functions ==
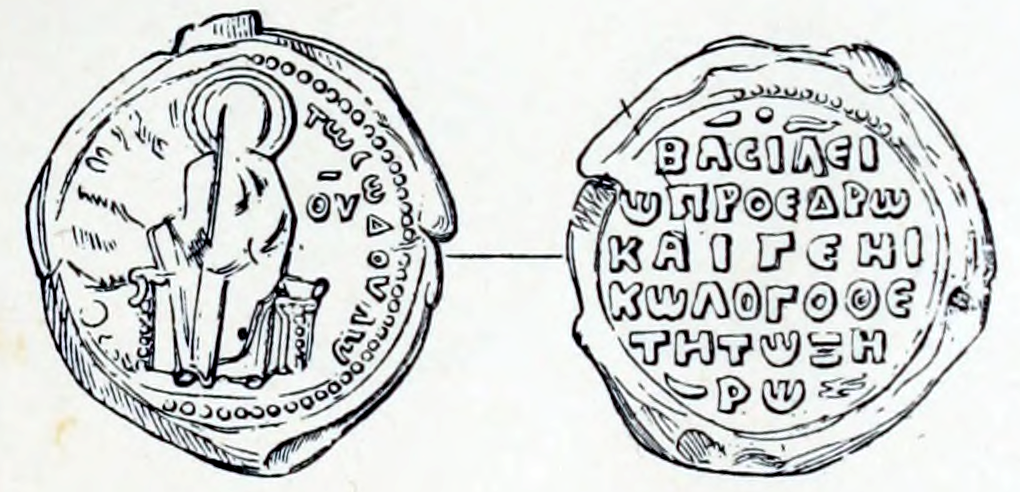
Seal of the proedros and genikos logothetes Basil Xeros (11th/12th centuries)

The genikon was responsible for general taxation and revenue, and also served as a court for financial cases. As such, it broadly fulfilled the tasks of the earlier sacrae largitiones, although it was mostly derived from the "general department" of the praetorian prefecture. The first attested logothetes tou genikou, the monk Theodotos, is mentioned in 692, but the post may have been instituted as early as 626. The bureau of the genikon and its logothete remained one of the chief ministries for the entire middle Byzantine period (7th–12th centuries), with the 899 Klētorologion of Philotheos recording the position as ranking 33rd in the imperial hierarchy. During the Komnenian period, its importance declined, but recovered under the Angeloi. Following the sack of Constantinople in 1204 and the dissolution of the Byzantine Empire, the office of the logothetes tou genikou was retained as a purely honorary title by the successor state of Nicaea and the restored Palaiologan Empire after 1261.

The mid-14th century writer Pseudo-Kodinos records him in the 20th place in the imperial hierarchy, between the parakoimomenos of the imperial bedchamber and the protovestiarites. His distinctive court dress and insignia during this time were a brimmed hat called skiadion of white silk, a silk long kaftan-like kabbadion, and for ceremonies and festivities, a domed skaranikon hat of white and gold silk, with gold-wire embroidery and decorated with images of the emperor in the front and back. Unlike other officials, he bore no staff of office (dikanikion). Amongst the Palaiologan-era holders were significant intellectuals and statesmen, such as George Akropolites and Theodore Metochites. The last recorded logothetes tou genikou was a certain John Androuses in 1380. By that time, however, its original functions had long been forgotten; as the Pseudo-Kodinos records, "the function of the General Logothete is unknown".

== Subordinate officials ==
The subordinates of the logothetēs tou genikou were:

- The chartoularioi megaloi tou sekreto (χαρτουλάριοι μεγάλοι τοῦ σεκρέτου, 'great chartularies of the department'), the heads of the various departments.
- The chartoularioi ton arklon (χαρτουλάριοι τῶν ἀρκλῶν, where ἀρκλα means '[money] box"' i.e. 'treasury') or exo chartoularioi (ἔξω χαρτουλάριοι, 'outer chartularies'). As their name signifies, they were the senior treasury officials posted in the provinces ('outer', i.e. outside Constantinople).
- The epoptai of the themata (ἐπόπται τῶν θεμάτων), who were the officials charged with control of taxation in the provinces.
- The kometes hydaton (κόμητες ὑδάτων, 'counts of the waters'), officials probably in charge of aqueducts and water supply in the provinces.
- The chartoularios tou oikistikou (χαρτουλάριος τοῦ οἰκιστικοῦ) or simply ho oikistikos, whose precise functions are unknown. It is attested that he was in charge of tax exemptions, and had various juridical duties in some themata in the 11th century; the office may have been associated with the imperial domains (oikoi). By the 11th century, the office had become an independent bureau, but vanishes after that.
- The kommerkiarioi (κομμερκιάριοι), who were customs officials. Attested since the early 6th century, they are likely the successors of the comes commerciorum mentioned in the Notitia Dignitatum. Initially stationed at the frontier, after the 7th century they were placed at ports or in charge over entire themata or individual islands.
- The epi tes kouratorias [of the basilikoi oikoi] (ἐπί τῆς κουρατωρίας [τῶν βασιλικῶν οἴκων], 'in charge of the curatorship [of the imperial domains]'), who supervised the imperial estates.
- The komes tes lamias (κόμης τῆς λαμίας), an official probably in charge of the mines and gold bullion (cf. Latin: lamina/lamna, 'gold, precious metals'). It is therefore usually assumed that he is the successor of the old comes metallorum per Illyricum. From sigillographic evidence through the 11th century, this office was sometimes combined with the positions of epi ton oikeiakon ('in charge of the oikeiakoi", a class of senior courtiers) and of one of the chartoularioi megaloi of the genikon.
- The dioiketai (διοικηταὶ), officials who supervised the collection of taxes, assisted by a number of praktores ('agents').
- The kom[v]entianos (κομ[β]εντιανός), an official of unknown function.
- A number of kankellarioi (καγκελλάριοι, from Latin: cancellarius) under a protokankellarios. Originally senior officials in the praetorian prefecture, in the middle Byzantine period they were mid-level secretaries in the various ministries.

== Sources ==
- Bury, J. B. (1911). The Imperial Administrative System of the Ninth Century – With a Revised Text of the Kletorologion of Philotheos. London: Oxford University Press. OCLC 1046639111.
- Guilland, Rodolphe (1971). "Les Logothètes: Etudes sur l'histoire administrative de l'Empire byzantin" [The Logothetes: Studies on the Administrative History of the Byzantine Empire]. Revue des études byzantines (in French). 29: 5–115. doi:10.3406/rebyz.1971.1441.
- Kazhdan, Alexander, ed. (1991). The Oxford Dictionary of Byzantium. Oxford and New York: Oxford University Press. ISBN 0-19-504652-8.
- Louth, Andrew (2005). Fouracre, Paul (ed.). The New Cambridge Medieval History, Volume 1, c.500–c.700. Cambridge: Cambridge University Press. ISBN 978-1-13905393-8.
- Verpeaux, Jean, ed. (1966). Pseudo-Kodinos, Traité des Offices. Paris: Centre National de la Recherche Scientifique.
