= Chaka Bey =

Turkish military commander

Tzachas
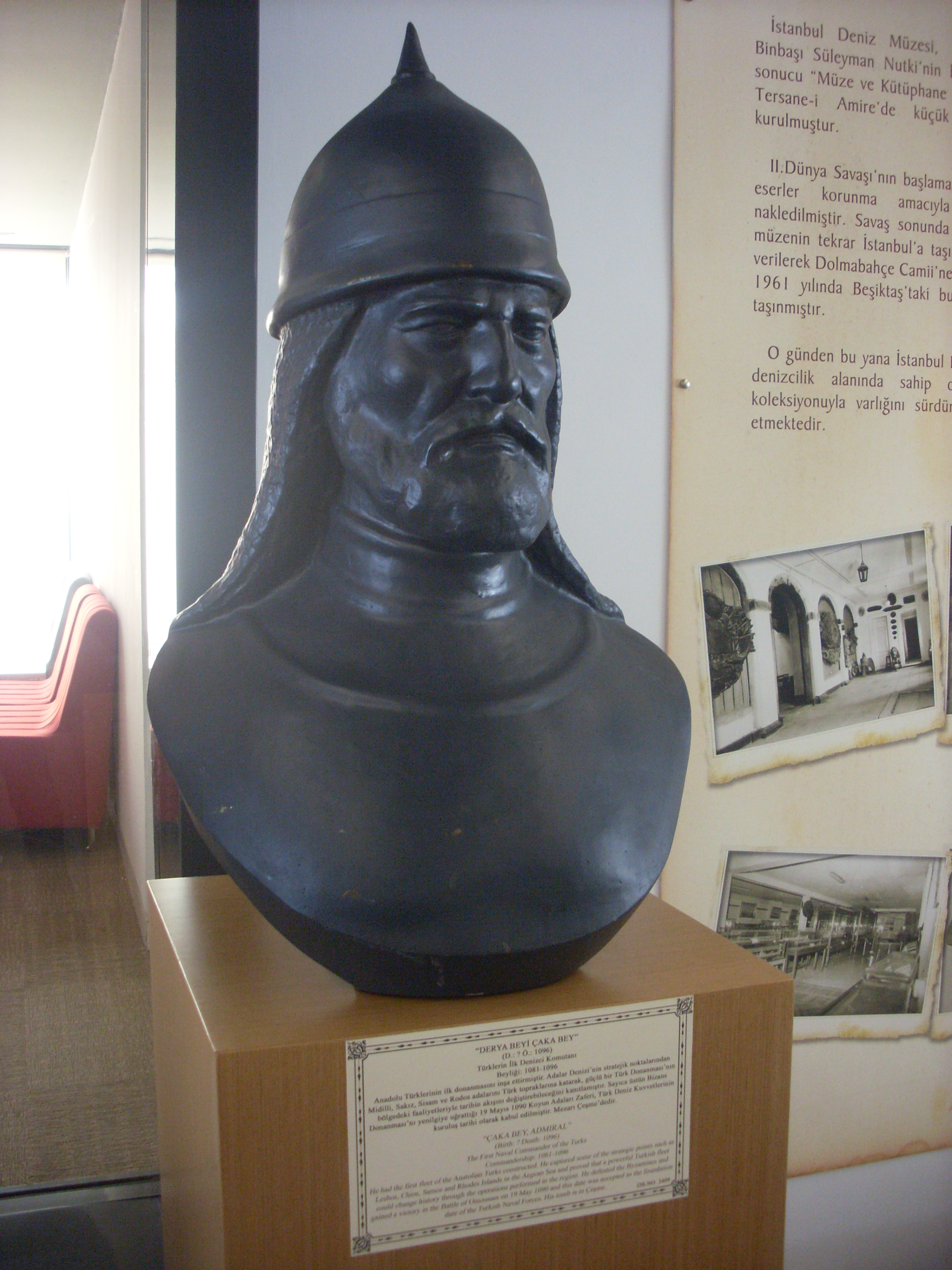
- Modern representation of Tzachas in the Istanbul Naval Museum

Bey of Smyrna
- Reign: c. 1081 ‒ 1093
- Successor: Unnamed son
- Born: Unknown
- Died: 1093; Sultanate of Rum (modern-day Turkey)
- Issue: Ayse Hatun (wife of Kilij Arslan I)
- Religion: Islam

Chaka Bey (Turkish: Çaka Bey; Medieval Greek: Τζαχάς) (Note: "Tzachas" is the Hellenized form of a Turkish name which does not appear in any historical documents, but was likely "Chaka", "Chagha", or "Chaqan". The name "Chaka", in the modern Turkish alphabet "Çaka", prevailed especially in modern Turkey, after Historian Akdes Nimet Kurat used it in his work Çaka: Orta Zamanda İzmir ve Yakınındaki Adaların Türk Hakimi, Istanbul, 1936, ... yüksek siyasî ve askerî görüş sahibi olarak büyük önem taşıyan bu bey'in adının gerçek söylenişi henüz tamamen kesinliğe kavuşmuş değildir. Bu hususta şimdiye kadar üç ihtimal ileri sürülmüştür: Çaka, Çağa, Çakan. AN Kurat'ın bunu "Çaka" kabûl ederek eserini de "Çaka Bey" diye adlandırması, özellikle memleketimizde Çaka şeklinin yaygınlaşmasına yol açmıştır denebilir. (Tarih Dergisi, Cilt 20, İstanbul Üniversitesi Edebiyat Fakültesi, İbrahim Horoz Basımevi, 1983, p. 56.)) was an 11th-century Seljuk military commander of Oghuz Turk origin who ruled a vassal state of the Seljuks based in Smyrna (present-day Izmir). Originally in Byzantine service, he rebelled and seized Smyrna, much of the Aegean coastlands of Asia Minor and the islands lying off shore in 1088–91. At the peak of his power, he even declared himself as the Byzantine Emperor, and sought to assault Constantinople in conjunction with the Pechenegs. In 1092, a Byzantine naval expedition under Megadoux John Doukas inflicted a heavy defeat on him and retook Lesbos. He was later slain by his son-in-law the Sultan of Rum Kilij Arslan I the next year. Smyrna and the rest of Tzachas' former domain were recovered by the Byzantines a few years later, in c. 1097.

== Life ==
Very little is known about his life, and that mostly from only one source, the Alexiad of the Byzantine princess Anna Komnene, daughter of Emperor Alexios I Komnenos (r. 1081–1118). He is also mentioned in the 13th-century Danishmendname as 'Chavuldur Chaka' (Turkish: Çavuldur Çaka), but it is not a very reliable source due to the semi-legendary nature of its material.

According to the Alexiad, Tzachas was originally a raider, who was taken as a prisoner by the Byzantines during the reign of Emperor Nikephoros III Botaneiates (r. 1078–1081). Tzachas entered Byzantine service and advanced rapidly through imperial favour, receiving the title of protonobelissimos and rich gifts. However, when Alexios I Komnenos deposed Botaneiates in 1081, Tzachas lost his position and fled Byzantium.

From c. 1088 on, he used his base at Smyrna to wage war against the Byzantines. He may have converted to christianity in order to integrate himself within the Byzantine society). Employing Christian craftsmen, he built a fleet, with which he captured Phocaea and the eastern Aegean islands of Lesbos (except for the fortress of Methymna), Samos, Chios and Rhodes. A Byzantine fleet under Niketas Kastamonites was sent against him, but Tzachas defeated it in battle. Some modern scholars have speculated that his activities during this time may have been in conjunction, and perhaps even coordination, with two contemporary Byzantine rebels, Rhapsomates in Cyprus, and Karykes in Crete.

In 1090/91, the Byzantines under Constantine Dalassenos recovered Chios. Undeterred, Tzachas rebuilt his forces, and resumed his attacks, even proclaiming himself emperor (basileus) and seeking to conclude an alliance against Alexios I with the Pechenegs in Thrace for a joint attack on Constantinople. In 1092, Dalassenos and the new megas doux, John Doukas, were sent against Tzachas, and attacked the fortress of Mytilene on Lesbos. Tzachas resisted for three months, but finally had to negotiate a surrender of the fortress. During his return to Smyrna, Dalassenos attacked the Turkish fleet, which was almost destroyed.

According to the Alexiad, in spring 1093, Tzachas attacked the port of Abydos in the Sea of Marmara. Alexios I called upon the Sultan of Rum Kilij Arslan I (r. 1092–1107), who was married to Tzachas's daughter Ayşe Hatun and was thus his son-in-law, to attack Tzachas from the rear. The Sultan advanced to Abydos, where, at the pretext of inviting Tzachas to a banquet, he had his father-in-law murdered. However, c. 1097 a "Tzachas"—possibly the original Tzachas' son—is reported as still holding Smyrna when the Byzantine army under John Doukas recaptured the city.

== Legacy ==
The modern Turkish Naval Forces officially consider 1081, the capture of Smyrna by Tzachas, as their founding date.

== Sources ==
- Brand, Charles M. (1991). "Tzachas". In Kazhdan, Alexander (ed.). The Oxford Dictionary of Byzantium. Oxford and New York: Oxford University Press. p. 2134. ISBN 0-19-504652-8.
- Dawes, Elizabeth A., ed. (1928). The Alexiad. London: Routledge & Kegan Paul.
- Mallett, Alex (2013). "Çaka Bey". In Fleet, Kate; Krämer, Gudrun; Matringe, Denis; Nawas, John; Rowson, Everett (eds.). Encyclopaedia of Islam (3rd ed.). Brill Online. doi:10.1163/1573-3912_ei3_COM_27581. ISSN 1873-9830.
